= Run This Town (film) =

2019 film directed by Ricky Tollman

- Theatrical release poster
- Directed by: Ricky Tollman
- Screenplay by: Ricky Tollman
- Produced by: Jonathan Bronfman; Randy Manis
- Starring: Ben Platt; Mena Massoud; Nina Dobrev; Scott Speedman; Gil Bellows; Jennifer Ehle; Damian Lewis
- Cinematography: Nick Haight
- Edited by: Sandy Pereira
- Music by: Ali Shaheed Muhammad; Adrian Younge
- Production companies: CounterNarrative Films; JoBro Productions & Film Finance; Manis Film
- Distributed by: Oscilloscope (United States); Elevation Pictures (Canada)
- Release dates: March 9, 2019 (SXSW); March 6, 2020 (Canada and United States)
- Running time: 99 minutes
- Countries: Canada; United States
- Language: English

Run This Town is a 2019 drama film about Rob Ford's personal and work-related controversies during his final year as Toronto's mayor, written and directed by Ricky Tollman. It stars Ben Platt, Mena Massoud, Nina Dobrev, Scott Speedman, Gil Bellows, Jennifer Ehle, and Damian Lewis.

It had its world premiere at South by Southwest on March 9, 2019. It was released in the United States and Canada on March 6, 2020, by Oscilloscope and Elevation Pictures.

== Premise ==
The film details the turbulent final year of Rob Ford's tenure as the mayor of Toronto.

== Cast ==
- Ben Platt as Bram Shriver
- Mena Massoud as Kamal Arafa
- Nina Dobrev as Ashley Pollock
- Scott Speedman as David
- Gil Bellows as Detective Lowey
- Jennifer Ehle as Judith
- Damian Lewis as Rob Ford
- Emmanuel Kabongo as Abe
- Hamza Haq as Detective Sharma
- Justin Kelly as Neil
- Tanner Zipchen as Club Goer
- Allegra Fulton as Susan

== Production ==
It was announced in March 2018 that Ben Platt, Nina Dobrev, Mena Massoud and Damian Lewis were cast in the film. Filming began the next month in Toronto, along with the additions of Jennifer Ehle, Scott Speedman and Gil Bellows to the cast. Lewis, playing the role of Ford, was spotted on set in extensive makeup and donning a body suit.

== Release ==
The film had its world premiere at South by Southwest on March 9, 2019. It was released commercially in the United States and Canada on March 6, 2020.

== Reception ==
Critics negatively focused on the film for excising the role of investigative journalists Robyn Doolittle and Kevin Donovan in exposing the scandal, instead replacing them with a fictional novice male journalist. Donovan was critical of the film's portrayal of the media, particularly scenes depicting a reporter paying for the Rob Ford video. Allison Smith stated that Doolittle's replacement with a male journalist was problematic, and the film "would have been more interesting if it had followed Doolittle". She stated that Doolittle may have been replaced because her book Crazy Town: The Rob Ford Story had been optioned for a film or television production.

Joe Mihevc, formerly a councillor on Toronto City Council, stated that the film misrepresents Ford's character, portraying him as a mean-spirited individual and omitting the "humanness of Rob" and the traits that attracted those who voted for him.

The film was also praised by Donovan for its correct portrayal of the backroom politics, and by Smith for the depiction of reporters reconstructing a timeline of Rob Ford's activities based on postings to his social media accounts.

=== Awards ===
The film received three Canadian Screen Award nominations at the 8th Canadian Screen Awards, for Best Art Direction/Production Design (Chris Crane), Best Sound Editing (Nelson Ferreira, Dashen Naidoo, J.R. Fountain and Dustin Harris) and Best Makeup (Emily O'Quinn, Steve Newburn and Neil Morrill).
