= Timeline of Rob Ford crack video scandal =

Photograph given to Gawker and the Toronto Star provided as a "bonafide" for the video release in exchange for payment. From left to right: Anthony Smith, Rob Ford, Monir Kassim and Muhammad Khattak.

In May 2013, the American website Gawker and the Toronto Star reported that they had viewed a cellphone video that showed then-mayor of Toronto Rob Ford smoking crack cocaine and commenting on political issues. Gawker raised money to buy the video, but were unable to acquire it when the seller broke off contact. On October 31, 2013, the Toronto Police Service announced that they were in possession of the video, "and at least one other". The video was retrieved in the course of an investigation of drug gangs, entitled "Project Traveller". Ford's associate Alexander "Sandro" Lisi was charged with extortion for attempting to retrieve the video, in exchange for marijuana.

Reporters from the Toronto Star and Gawker were sent a photo still of Ford standing with three men filmed outside an Etobicoke residence garage door on Windsor Road, later revealed to be the residence of a Ford colleague. The individuals standing with Ford were later identified as Anthony Smith, Muhammad Khattak and Monir Kassim, allegedly affiliated with the Dixon City Bloods criminal gang. Khattak and Kassim were both arrested in a sweep of an apartment complex near the home in June 2013. Smith was killed in a shooting on the streets of downtown Toronto in March 2013. The home was attacked in a home invasion days after Gawker and the Toronto Star published the video story.

Ford initially denied both the existence of the video and using crack cocaine. Though several members of Toronto City Council, as well as the editorial boards of the Star, the National Post, and the Toronto Sun, called for him to step down, he refused to do so. On November 5, 2013, Ford admitted to smoking crack cocaine "probably in one of my drunken stupors" and to hiding his drug abuse from his family, his staff and the people of Toronto, but pledged to continue on as Mayor. In a series of votes later that month and in an ensuing media circus, Ford was then promptly relieved by the Municipal Council of virtually all of his recognized mayoral acting authority affects, but still left in the mayoral position office and attending council meetings (notably with his brother Doug) with then-Deputy Mayor Norm Kelly instated as the de facto Acting Mayor.

On April 30, 2014, a second video showing Ford smoking crack emerged. Ford took a leave of absence to enter drug rehabilitation from May 1 through June 30, 2014, during which time Kelly officially served as Acting Mayor. Ford did not run for re-election in 2014, instead running for, and winning, his former City Council seat; he continued to serve on the City Council until his death from cancer on March 22, 2016. In August 2016, the Toronto Police Service released the original video of Ford smoking crack, and the remaining charges against Lisi were dropped.

== 2013 ==
=== February to March ===
- February 17 Mayor Ford is surreptitiously recorded by Mohamed Siad smoking crack cocaine from a glass pipe. Siad also records a video of himself describing the recording of the first, and how to secretly record a video or "even catch a Mayor smoking crack".
- March 27 A police wiretap of a conversation between Mohamed Siad and Siyadin Abdi reveals their efforts to sell the crack video to Ford, rejecting an alleged offer of $5,000 and a new car by Ford. Siad is seeking $150,000.
- March 28 Anthony Smith and Muhammad Khattak, the gang members that appeared in the video still with Mayor Ford, are injured in a shooting outside the Loki Lounge in Toronto with Smith dying of his injuries. Wiretap surveillance leads police to believe the motive for the shooting was related to a robbery of other gang members by Smith and others in November 2012.

=== May ===
- May 3 Toronto Star reporters Robyn Doolittle and Kevin Donovan meet with Mohamed "Soya" Siad, 27, an alleged member of the Dixon Bloods, in the back seat of a car in the parking lot of 320 Dixon Road. Siad allows the reporters to view the Ford video on a cellphone three times and says he might sell it for a "six-figure price" so that he can move to Alberta.
- May 16 Gawker reports a cellphone video that appears to show Toronto mayor Rob Ford smoking crack cocaine and commenting on political issues. The video was believed to have been recorded late in 2012. Toronto Star reporters Kevin Donovan and Robyn Doolittle say they watched the video on May 3. The Star also publishes a picture of Ford with three men, two of whom were shot in March 2013. One of them, Anthony Smith, died.
- May 17 As Ford leaves his house in the morning to drive to City Hall, he speaks to a press scrum assembled: "Absolutely not true. It's ridiculous. It's another Toronto Star whatever." Gawker sets up a fund called "Crackstarter" to raise $200,000 to purchase the video.

- David Price, a long-time friend of Ford, informs Ford's Chief of Staff Mark Towhey of the location of the video at an apartment complex on Dixon Road in Etobicoke. Towhey advises Price to speak to the Toronto Police. Towhey contacts the police, who take a statement from Price.

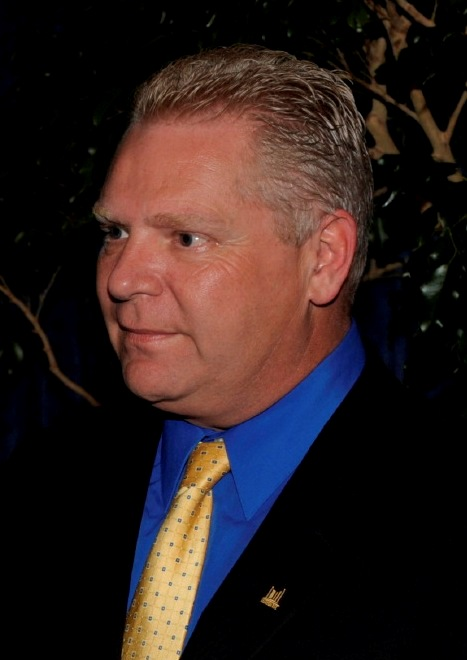
Councillor Doug Ford, 2011.

- May 19 Ford and his brother Doug cancel their weekly Newstalk 1010 talk show.
- May 20 Jay Leno comments on the scandal on The Tonight Show.
- May 21 Jon Stewart and Jimmy Kimmel comment on the scandal on their shows. A man is shot, requiring hospitalization, at a 17th floor apartment in the Dixon Road apartment complex.
- May 22 Ford is fired as football coach for Don Bosco Catholic Secondary School. He is also not allowed to coach at any other Catholic high school of the Toronto Catholic District School Board. Doug Ford addresses a press conference at City Hall, to defend his brother, his record at City Hall. He also criticized the Toronto Star: "Never, never has a Canadian politician or his family, has been targeted by the media this way. They zealously, and I say zealously, stalk my mother, my children. The media hides in the bushes at our cottage. They did this weekend, that my kids couldn’t even enjoy the weekend ’cause they were in the bushes taking videos of them, and harasses our family at home" and for reporting the alleged drug dealers as of Somali descent: "I also want to say that the story wrongfully generalizes and tarnishes the reputation of Toronto’s Somalian community."
- May 23 Ford fires his chief of staff, Mark Towhey. Towhey is escorted out of City Hall by security. Ford elevates deputy chief of staff Earl Provost. Several reports state that Towhey was fired for telling Ford to get help at a rehab centre. Gawker reports that they have raised more than $165,000 toward paying for the cellphone video, but were no longer in contact with the seller.
- May 24 After City Council's executive committee publicly asks Ford to respond to the allegations, Ford ends several days of silence and reads a prepared statement to the press at City Hall: "I do not use crack cocaine, nor am I an addict of crack cocaine." "As for a video, I cannot comment on a video that I have never seen or does not exist. It is most unfortunate, very unfortunate, that my colleagues and the great people of this city have been exposed to the fact that I have been judged by the media without evidence." According to his former press secretary Adrienne Batra, the statement was written by Ford's family, rejecting a prepared statement written by his staff.
  - That same day, Hanad Mohamed, who is alleged to have appeared in the video, is arrested in Fort McMurray, Alberta, by the Royal Canadian Mounted Police for the murder of Anthony Smith. He is returned to Toronto for an appearance in court on May 31.
- May 26 The Fords return to their Newstalk 1010 radio talk show. To a caller who asked if it was Ford in the video, Ford states "Number one, there’s no video, so that’s all I can say. You can’t comment on something that doesn’t exist." The Fords criticize the media and Rob calls reporters "a bunch of maggots." Ford also characterizes a caller as "racist" for asking if it was Ford in the picture. According to Ford: "That’s very sad, that she’s a racist," while Doug added, "Rob has taken thousands of pictures with young black men, with their hats on, with their little funny signs and everything else."
- May 27 Ford's press secretary and deputy press secretary resign and leave City Hall before Ford arrives. Ford apologizes for calling reporters maggots. Gawker reaches their fund-raising goal. Ford hires his brother's executive assistant as his new communications director and hires an interim press secretary. A poll of 1,400 Torontonians is released by the Toronto Star. It shows support for Ford at 36% in a projected 2014 mayoral election against Olivia Chow, a result identical to a poll held before the stories about the alleged video were published.
- May 28 The Toronto Sun reports that it also was offered the alleged video. An editor in the newsroom received a call from someone who had a video, asking if the newspaper paid for videos. The editor declines to pursue the video. It is Ford's 44th birthday and press crowd Ford at City Hall for comment about Price's statement to police. Ford tells reporters: "Ask my staff."
- May 30 Two more of Ford's staff resign: Brian Johnston, a policy advisor and council relations specialist, and Kia Nejatian, an executive assistant. A National Post reporter visits the apartment in the Dixon Road complex where the alleged video is stored and speaks to the resident. The resident describes how his apartment was previously rented by a drug dealer. The resident also claims to have seen the video and believes it to be authentic. According to the resident, gang members in the neighbourhood were angry at the video's sellers. The resident goes further to state that he and his friends considered making a fraudulent crack video starring an acquaintance and a Rob Ford look-alike nicknamed "Slurpy," but decided to not get involved in the controversy.
- May 31 Another of Ford's staff resigns: special assistant Michael Prempeh, the sixth departure from his staff. The accused who was arrested in Fort McMurray for the Smith shooting makes his first appearance in court and is ordered held in custody until another appearance on June 21. "Slurpy" becomes a trending term across Canada on Twitter.

=== June ===
- June 1 Several hundred people protest at Nathan Phillips Square demanding Ford's resignation. The event was organized on Facebook and was expected to draw over 2,000 to the Square.
- June 3 A poll by CTV News and Ipsos Reid shows that slightly more than half of Torontonians believe that the video exists and they disagreed with the Ford brothers. Support for Ford is highest in the suburbs of Etobicoke, North York and Scarborough.
- June 4 Gawker reports that the person alleged to have had the cellphone video says it no longer exists and he will not sell it. An intermediary tells them that a copy might exist but has been taken out of Toronto for safe-keeping.
- June 5 The Toronto Star reports the house location where the photograph of the mayor with the young men was taken. The house was reported to have had a home invasion on May 21, 2013, injuring two persons. One resident of the home was an acquaintance of Ford from high school. The home is located several hundred metres from the Dixon Road apartment complex. Residents have complained previously of a steady stream of traffic between the complex and the home, prompting a fence to be erected to block traffic. Two residents have criminal records, one for minor thefts, one for trafficking cocaine. Maclean's identified the victims of the home invasion as Fabio Basso, Ford's long-time friend, and Basso's girlfriend. Resident Elena Basso tells Star reporters at her house that "Rob Ford’s the greatest mayor ever. You guys are scavengers."
- June 10 A court in Fort McMurray grants access to search warrant details related to the arrest of Hanad Mohamed to the lawyer for The Star and other media outlets. The details can then be used to make access to information requests to the RCMP. Mohamed's lawyer objects to the request to prevent the media from going on a "fishing expedition." "It seems to me, your honour, that the media is looking for some sort of information that would link my client to Rob Ford, or Rob Ford to my case, and then they’re just going to use that for entertainment purposes."
- June 11 The two campaign managers credited with Ford's election, Richard Ciano, president of the Progressive Conservative Party of Ontario, and Nick Kouvalis, who are partners in Campaign Research, say they will not work on Ford's re-election unless he deals with his "health and well-being." They said they had asked Ford to address his health issues as early as February. Ford fires Councillor Jaye Robinson from the City Council's executive committee after she suggests he take a leave of absence to deal with his personal problems.
- June 12 Doug Ford says he will not run for Council in 2014, but will work on his brother's mayoral campaign.
- June 13 As part of the "Project Traveller" pre-dawn raid (directed against two rival gangs engaged in drugs and firearms sales), police enter the home of Muhammad Khattak, one of the men photographed with Ford outside the suspected crackhouse, and remove a laptop and cellphones. The Toronto Star reports that sources have told them surveillance by police detectives has found information about the cellphone video. Monir Kassim, who also appeared in the photograph, is arrested too. Police also arrest Mohamed Siad, who had originally shown the Ford video to the two Toronto Star reporters. At a press conference about the raids, Toronto Police Chief Bill Blair refused to link the investigation and raids to Ford.

- CTV News reported that the Toronto Police was investigating the existence of the alleged video prior to the first published reports. According to CTV, persons under investigation discussed the video and the events of the video in wiretap-recorded conversations done in the course of the investigation. Ford was asked by reporters if he’s worried that the alleged video is now part of evidence that will come out in court: "I can’t comment on something that I’ve never seen or doesn’t exist, I don’t know how many more times I’ve got to say this. I’ve answered so many questions, I don’t know if you guys can’t get it through your thick skulls. Seriously?"

- June 14 Hacker collective Anonymous announced via Twitter that it believes a copy of the alleged video exists in Alberta. The Toronto Star identifies the third man with Ford in the picture taken outside the Etobicoke bungalow as Monir Kassim. Kassim was arrested in the June 13 raids for "trafficking in weapons and drugs (cocaine and marijuana) for the benefit of a criminal organization," and other charges. A letter from Ford is presented by the defence in the sentencing of Sandro Lisi after Lisi's conviction for threatening to kill a woman.
- June 17 Gawker announces that it is looking for charities to give the "Crackstarter" funds to. It asks "Canadians of Canada" to suggest charities for the $184,689.81 it has collected.
- June 26 Christopher Fickel, a special assistant in Ford's office, resigns. Ontario Attorney General John Gerretsen declines to name what laws are preventing Toronto Police Chief Bill Blair from indicating if Ford is or is not under investigation, when questioned by the press. The National Post identifies "Slurpy," the man who was asked to appear in a fake crack video as Rob Ford. They report that he does not look like Ford and that he said he rejected appearing in the bogus video.
- June 27 Nisar Hashimi pleads guilty to a manslaughter charge in the death of Anthony Smith and aggravated assault in the shooting of Mohammad Khattak, the other man in the photo with Ford. Hashimi's plea avoids a trial.

=== July ===
- July 2 The CBC, The Globe and Mail, Toronto Sun and other news organizations request a Toronto court to unseal police search warrants in the raids on the gangs. According to the news organizations' lawyer, the documents should be public knowledge unless there is a good reason to withhold them. The action is to determine if Rob Ford is somehow connected to the criminal organizations. The Crown asks for a six-month delay in releasing the warrants.

- The Toronto Star separately filed a request to see the information on a search warrant for the Windsor Road house and the apartment in the Dixon Road complex where the alleged video was allegedly stored. The court ruled that documents relating to the search warrants will stay sealed until August 27. At that time, lawyers for the media companies will be allowed to review the documents except for sections that the Crown will keep secret. The documents will become public on September 12 after arguments over the secret sections.

- July 9 Muhammad Khattak is released on bail. He was charged in the Project Traveller raids for allegedly dealing drugs and had been held without bail. The reasons for releasing Khattak are protected under a publication ban, but his lawyer stated that Khattak is only 19, does not have a criminal record and has strict stay-at-home conditions. His case, on charges his lawyer characterized as "minor," could take up to 18 months to come to trial.
- July 18 Gawker announces that it will divide the money it raised to buy the Ford video evenly between four charities: the Somali Canadian Association of Etobicoke, the South Riverdale Community Health Centre, Unison Health and Community Services and the Ontario Regional Addictions Partnership Committee. The gross amount raised was $201,199, which netted $184,782.61 after fees paid to Indiegogo and PayPal.
- July 19 The search warrant of Hanad Mohamed's arrest is unsealed by the Ontario Superior Court, revealing that police seized four smartphones and a micro SD card connecting Mohamed to Nisar Hashimi. The contents of these devices will not be revealed until trial.
- July 26 Crown prosecutors drop first degree murder charges against Hanad Mohamed. He is now charged with accessory after the fact to manslaughter, accessory to discharging a firearm and accessory to aggravated assault on Muhammad Khattak.
- July 30 Monir Kassim is granted bail and released from detention.

=== August to September ===
- August 2 The Toronto Star reports that Mohamed Siad, one of the men who showed the alleged video to reporters, was one of the people arrested in the Project Traveller raids. The Toronto Sun reports that Siad had been stabbed while in custody by alleged gang members who blamed him for causing the Project Traveller raids. It also reports that Siad had offered to turn the video over to police in return for dropping charges against him.
- August 7 Mohamed Siad, Monir Kassim and Muhammad Khattak appear in court to set trial dates. Siad remains in jail while Kassim and Khattak are out on bail until trial.
- August 8 City Hall confirms that "special assistant" Carley McNeil no longer works in Ford's office as an events co-ordinator. The Toronto Star reports that three sources say she was fired. She is the eighth staff member to have left since the video scandal became public.
- August 12 The Globe and Mail reports that Ford attempted to visit an inmate in the Toronto West Detention Centre, Bruno Bellissimo, in March, after visiting hours. The newspaper calls Bellissimo a "new character" in the video scandal, who has been involved in drugs and attended secondary school with one of the residents of the Rexdale bungalow where Ford was photographed.
- August 15 Toronto Sun columnist Warren Kinsella claims that the crack video was obtained by police via the Project Traveller raids and has been viewed by "many, many Toronto defence lawyers."
- August 17 Toronto Police interview five former staffers in Rob Ford's office about Alessandro "Sandro" Lisi, a private driver for the mayor, allegedly being investigated in an attempt to acquire the video. Both Lisi and Bruno Bellissimo were present at the Toronto Garrison Officer's Ball on February 22, an event where Ford was previously accused of being intoxicated.
- August 20 The Ontario Press Council announces it will hold public hearings in September to investigate 41 complaints about the Toronto Star and Globe and Mail's reporting during the scandal.
- August 27 A 'domestic assault' call at the Ford residence disrupts a police sting involving Lisi. Lisi contacts Ford and does not drive to the sting. Lisi instead goes home, then to the Grand Hotel on Jarvis Street, where Ford has checked in. Ford is observed the next day in the alley behind the Grand Hotel, in his SUV, making an exchange with a man on foot. The alleyway area is known as "crack central" by locals. Ford stays in the hotel for three days.
- September 9 The Ontario Press Council holds hearings on Globe and Star stories, with editors Michael Cooke and John Stackhouse testifying. The Ford brothers do not attend.

=== October ===
- October 1 Sandro Lisi and another man are arrested by police in Etobicoke. Lisi is charged with possession of and trafficking in marijuana, possession of the proceeds of crime and conspiracy. The arrest is part of the larger Project Traveller probe. Charges would later be dismissed May 8, 2015.
- October 2 Doug Ford talks to the Toronto Sun about the Lisi arrests: "I support the police investigation. I don’t know this guy. Never seen him, never met him — ever."
- October 7 A leaked police document links Lisi to an attempt to exchange marijuana for "the return of a cellular phone stolen from an associate" in March 2013.
- October 16 The Globe and Mail and Toronto Star are fully exonerated by the Ontario Press Council. Doug Ford accuses the agency of being "a bunch of cronies."
- October 23 The Toronto Star reports that the Rexdale bungalow where Ford was photographed was under surveillance by police, and Mohamed Siad, who tried to sell the video to the Star, was observed on several occasions visiting the residence. Police surveillance records also correspond to the date and time of a meeting between Gawker editor John Cook and Siad.
- October 30 The Ontario Superior Court orders that a 480-page police document that was used to obtain search warrants for Lisi be made public. Peter Jacobsen, the lawyer who is representing The Globe and Mail and other news organizations, notes that the information is "exceptionally long" given the nature of Lisi's charges.

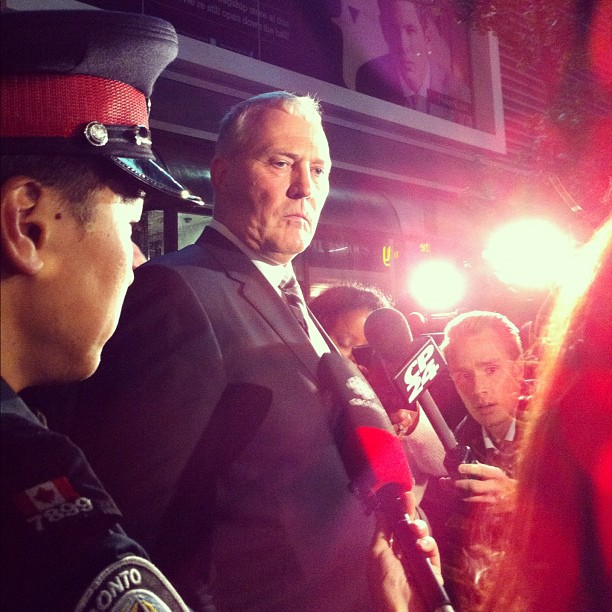
Chief Blair spoke regarding released documents. He is seen here in June 2012.

- October 31 Heavily redacted court documents released show that Toronto Police investigated the alleged crack video of Ford and the attempted recovery of the video by Lisi. Surveillance photographs show Ford meeting Lisi in various locations. Ford and Lisi were trailed and monitored by police from March until October 2013, including the use of a Cessna plane after Lisi started using "counter-surveillance" methods to lose police. In the course of the investigation, former mayoral staffer Chris Fickel was interviewed by Toronto Police and suggested that Lisi was the source of marijuana and cocaine for Ford.

- Police reveal existence of video
  - In a press conference held after the release of the documents, Toronto Police Chief Blair reveals that the police recovered a copy of the video from the hard drive of a computer seized during the Project Traveller raids. According to Blair, the video's contents are as described in the media reports. Lisi is charged with extortion related to the video and is to appear in Toronto Court later in the day (Lisi's hearing is held the next day). Blair states that the video will come out in court, and that the contents are "disappointing". Lisi tell investigators that Blair "is going to get his."
  - At his City Hall office, Ford briefly addressed the media "Everyone has seen the allegations. I wish I could come out and defend myself but I can't. It's before the courts. That's all I can say right now. No reason to resign. I am going to go back and return my phone calls and be out doing what the people elected me to do and that's save taxpayers money and run the great government that we've been running the last three years."
  - Toronto newspapers Toronto Sun, The Globe and Mail, National Post and the Toronto Star all call on Ford to resign. A same-day public opinion poll conducted by phone of Torontonians showed that, while 44% approved of the mayoral job Ford was doing, 60% wanted him to resign. The news that the video has been found by the police is reported internationally.

=== November ===
- November 1 Dennis Morris, Ford's lawyer, appears on various media outlets denying that Ford is smoking crack cocaine in the video. Doug Ford urges the public release of the video: "Let’s see the video, the Chief said there’s a video and I believe the Chief. Rob hasn’t been charged with anything, he hasn’t broken a law, and he’s been convicted, he’s been convicted by the media." Sandro Lisi is released on $5,000 bail. The Toronto Region Board of Trade calls for Ford to take a leave of absence.

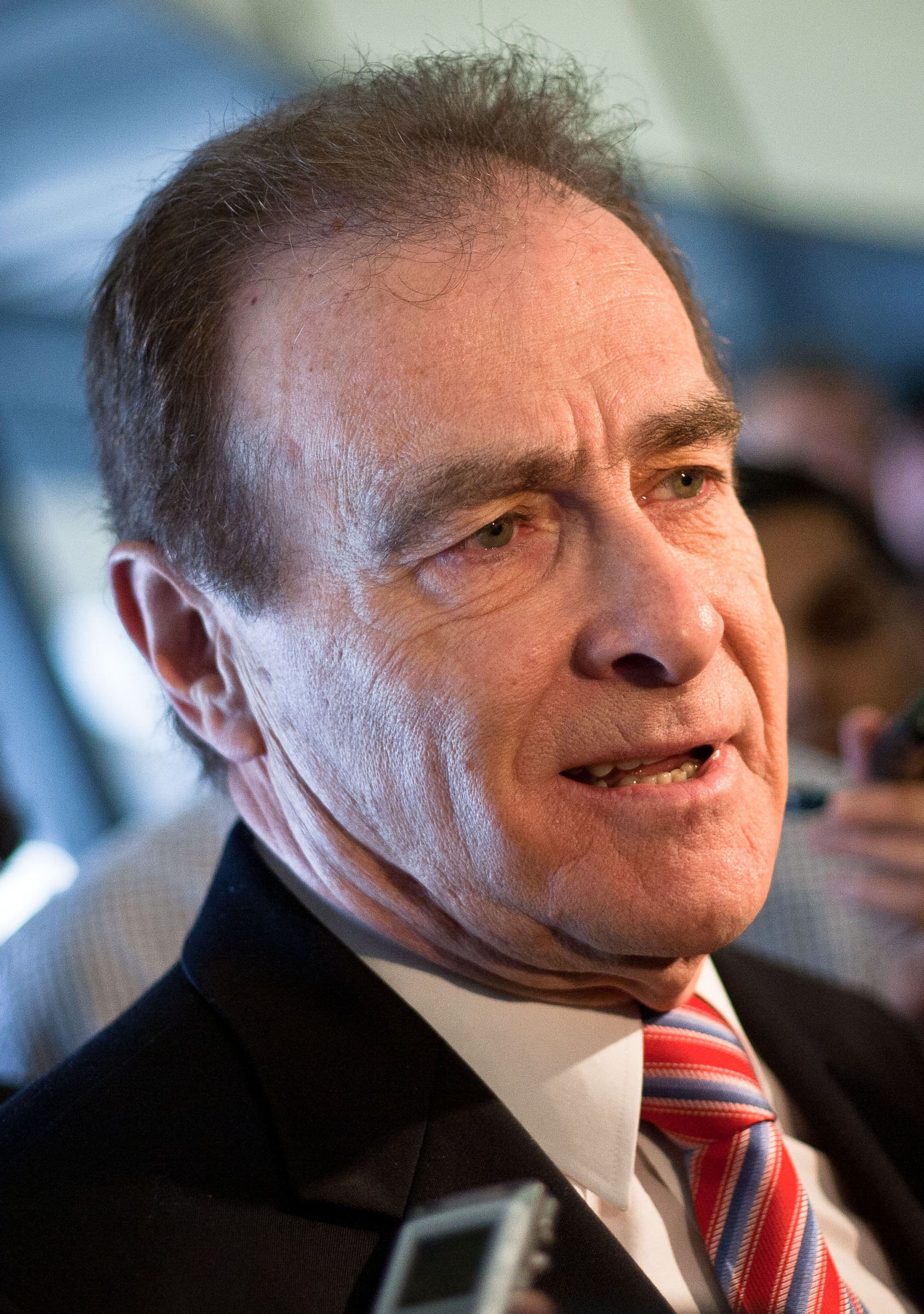
Councillor Kelly, 2012

- November 2 Ford refuses to speak to reporters and calls police when media follow him. Ford meets with deputy mayor Norm Kelly who passes on recommendations from Councillors and staff for Ford to take leave of absence. After the meeting, Kelly tells the Toronto Sun that Ford will address the scandal on his weekly radio show.
- November 3 On his weekly radio show, Ford apologizes for "making mistakes", but plans to continue as mayor and run for re-election in 2014. "There's no one to blame but myself, and I take full responsibility for it. I'm the first one to admit, friends, I am not perfect. I have made mistakes. I have made mistakes, and all I can do right now is apologize for the mistakes." Ford also publicly asks Police Chief Blair to release the video to the public. "I believe that this video — I want the police chief, Bill Blair, to release this video, for every single person in the city to see," Referring to the content of the video, Ford responded "When the video is released, I am going to explain to the best of my mind what is in that video or videos".
- November 4 Rob Ford is "uninvited" from the November 6 "Police Chief's Ball", an event hosted by Chief Blair to raise funds for Victim Services Toronto.

- Ford appears on 640 CFMJ's morning show with John Oakley. Ford denies using drugs. "I can assure you, I can assure you, Johnny, that I do not use drugs. I drink, don’t get me wrong. I’m the first one to enjoy a few cocktails. Some of the parties I’ve had, you know, I shouldn’t have went [sic] to the Danforth, you know, inebriated. I shouldn’t have had a pretty, I would say, a wild St. Patrick’s Day party in my office. I shouldn’t have done that. That’s the past. The past is the past."

- November 5 Doug Ford calls on Police Chief Blair to resign, calling him biased against Rob Ford. Ford asks Police Services Review Board Chair Alok Mukherjee for a meeting, but is turned down, stating that a meeting with Doug Ford would be viewed as interfering with a police investigation.

A Global News poll is released, its results nearly the same as the previous week, with 59% wanting Ford to step down, while 43% approved of the job Ford is doing.
- Ford admits to smoking crack cocaine
  - At midday, Mayor Rob Ford admits to having smoked crack cocaine, saying "Yes, I have smoked crack cocaine but … am I an addict? No. Have I tried it? Probably in one of my drunken stupors, probably approximately about a year ago". Responding to why the admission took so long, Ford says "I wasn’t lying. You didn’t ask the correct questions". At the end of the day, Ford held a scheduled announcement, reiterating an apology to the City of Toronto. He said "I kept this from my family, especially my brother Doug, my staff, my council colleagues because I was embarrassed and ashamed." and added "To the residents of Toronto, I know I have let you down and I can't do anything else but apologize and apologize and I'm so sorry. I know I have to regain your trust and your confidence." He concluded the announcement by stating he will stay in office and will run for re-election.
  - Vice magazine publishes an article claiming that Amin Massoudi, Ford's communications director, had hired a hacker to delete a copy of the crack video on a file-sharing site. Massoudi denies the claim in emails to Maclean's and to Vice.
  - The news puts Rob Ford and Toronto in the international media and that evening Jon Stewart, Stephen Colbert, Jimmy Kimmel, Craig Ferguson and Jay Leno all mentioned him on their late night shows.

- November 6 Brooks Barnett, Ford's policy advisor resigns. Former wrestler The Iron Sheik appears at City Hall to arm-wrestle Ford as a form of intervention.
- November 7 Another video appears in the media depicting Ford in a tirade in which he shouts "I need fuckin' ten minutes to make sure he's dead!" amongst other threats. The context of the threats and the video are unknown. The video had been shopped around to various media outlets before being purchased by the Toronto Star for $5,000. Ford states that he was "extremely inebriated" in the video: "All I can say is again I’ve made mistakes. It’s extremely embarrassing. The whole world’s going to see it. You know what? I don’t have a problem with it. But it is extremely embarrassing, but I don’t know what to say but again I am apologizing. Again, when you’re in that state ... I hope none of you have ever or will ever be in that state."

- The Mayor's mother and sister, Diane Ford and Kathy Ford, do an exclusive interview with CP24; Diane says that it's "not acceptable behaviour", but doesn't believe he should resign. Former wrestler Brutus Beefcake shows up at City Hall to offer to be Ford's "angel of mercy" and is removed by security. For the third night running, Ford was lampooned by Jon Stewart on The Daily Show; Jimmy Kimmel once again mentioned him. Dr. Drew Pinsky (Dr. Drew On Call) featured a panel discussion, commenting "I’m worried the guy’s going to die."

- November 8 The Fords' weekly radio show is cancelled permanently, by mutual agreement of CFRB and the Fords. Lawyers apply in court for the release of crack video, and further pages of the search warrant requests in the Lisi case.

- In interviews with CBC's The Fifth Estate and CityNews Toronto's Avery Haines, Mohamed Farah claims he was the person who tried to broker the deal to sell the crack video and says there was more than one video. He says that he was offered cash and threatened by organized crime figures to turn over the video to them. Farah was charged with possession of the proceeds of crime and firearms offences in Project Traveller.
- A billboard appears along the Gardiner Expressway, in support of Ford; the City announces it will investigate an unauthorized use of its logo. The billboard, which misspelled "responsibility" (spelling it responsiblity) and used the City of Toronto logo without permission, was removed by the afternoon of November 9.

- November 11 At a ceremony for Remembrance Day, Ford was greeted with "boos" from the audience and scorn from Veterans attending. At least one Veteran blatantly refused to shake his hand. A Ford spokesperson says he will appear in the Toronto Santa Claus Parade, despite his assurances to organizers he will not.
- November 12 In court, the two videos of Ford in the possession of the police are revealed to be different length videos of the same event. The first video is 90 seconds long; the second is shorter. Judge Nordheimer views the videos and reserves judgment whether to release them to Muhammad Khattak or his lawyer for viewing. Khattak, one of the men shot, had been arrested in Project Traveller raids for drug dealing. Khattak is seeking to make it clear that he was not involved in recording the video or attempting to sell it.

- Ford appears at a United Way fund-raising event at City Hall, signing 1,000 bobbleheads in his likeness. After bobbleheads run out, Ford autographs t-shirts. Many of the bobbleheads are put up for auction on the Internet.
- Toronto Santa Claus Parade organizers send a letter to Ford's Chief of Staff, Earl Provost, asking that Ford consider returning to his original decision of not appearing in the parade, suggesting that his presence would be a distraction "from the anticipated fun and enjoyment that children will have on Parade Day." The letter was read the next day on television channel CP24 by Ron Barbaro, co-chair of the event.

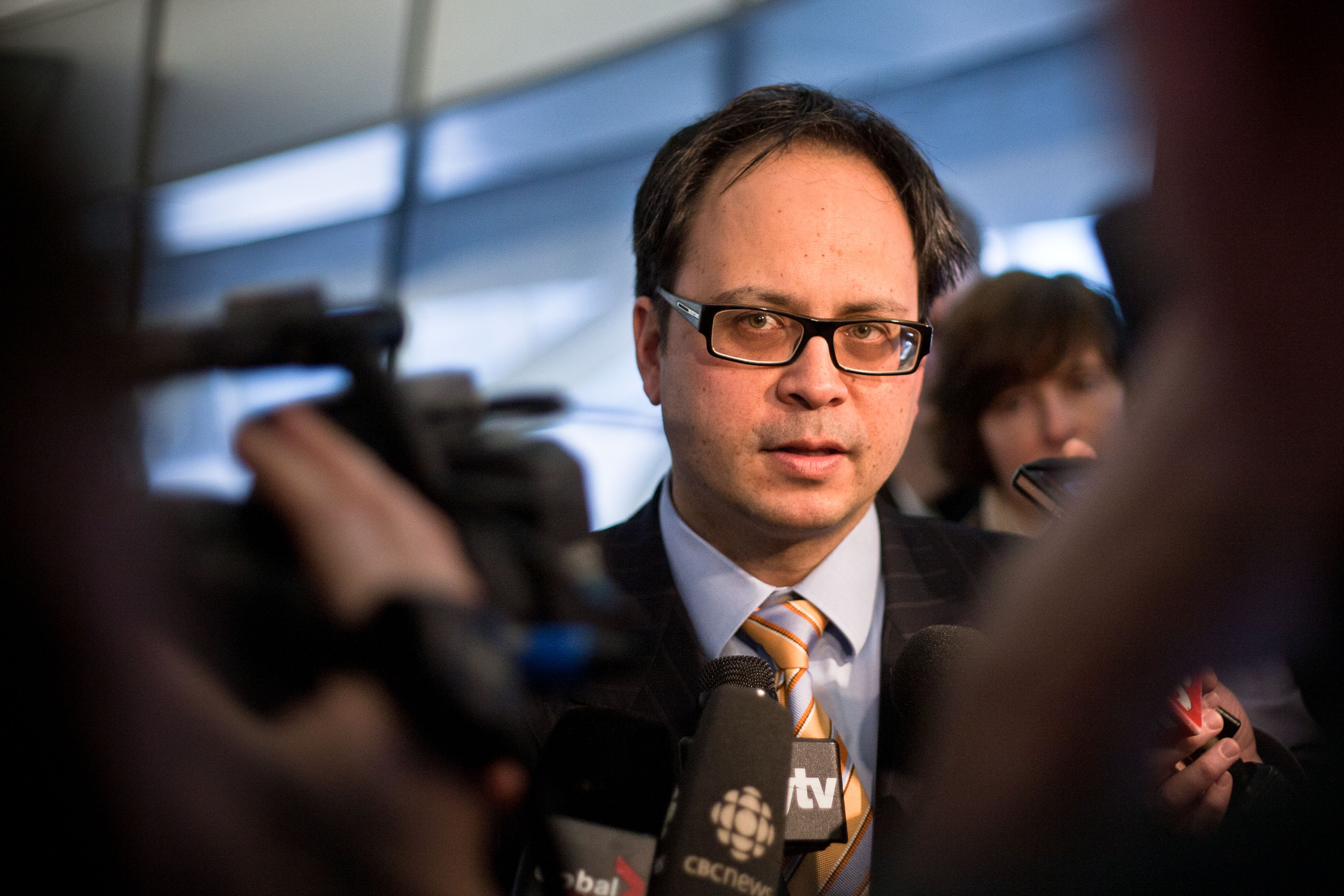
Councillor Denzil Minnan-Wong, in 2012.

- November 13–15

- November 13
- Council asks Ford to take a leave of absence
  - At a Toronto City Council meeting, Ford admits to having purchased illegal drugs within the past two years. Thirty of the 44 Councillors entered a petition to Council asking Ford to step down. An anti-Ford rally is organized outside City Hall during the meeting. The Council was considering Ford's behaviour and voted 37-5 for Ford to take a leave of absence. Council also voted for Ford to apologize for misleading council; co-operate with the Police; apologize for letter of reference for Lisi and communicate with Council instead of the media. Ford states that "he is not a rat" but pushes for mandatory drug testing for all Councillors by December 1, paid for by himself. Chair Frances Nunziata ruled Ford's motion out of order. Council proceedings were shown live in the US on CNN; coverage including a Ford quote mocking his commitment to substance issues ("I said it wouldn't happen again and it has never happened again at the Air Canada Centre"), was published internationally.
  - Ford appeared to confront Councillor Denzil Minnan-Wong on the council chamber's floor, both times the Speaker stopped the debate. Councillor Maria Augimeri separated the two, and Councillor Ford held the Mayor's arm.
  - Judge Nordheimer orders the release of the rest of the blacked-out items in the documents detailing the surveillance of Ford and Lisi. The new content was based on interviews with Ford staffers, who detailed drunk driving, sexual harassment, staffers buying liquor for the Mayor, the Mayor taking Oxycontin and the Mayor consorting with prostitutes. One of the new staffers, David Price, a friend of Ford, was hired by Ford at $130,000 per year, twice the salary of his immediate predecessor. As Doug and Rob Ford leave City Hall, they warn the press to "be careful what you write" about the allegations.
  - An Ipsos Reid poll is released showing that 76% of Torontonians want Ford to step down or resign. Of the 76%, 41% suggest Ford retire from politics altogether, while the remaining 35% agree with the idea that Ford should take a leave of absence before running for re-election in 2014. The remaining 24% agree with Ford staying on as mayor.
- November 14
  - Ford threatens legal action against his former staffers and a waiter at the restaurant of the 2012 St. Patrick's Day night party, calling their allegations "outright lies, not true." Ford also specifically denied the allegations of sex and a comment about oral sex made to a staff member, and that a woman who attended the St. Patrick's Day night party was a prostitute. "It hurts my wife when they call a friend of mine a prostitute. Alana is not a prostitute. She's a friend. And it makes me sick how people are saying this." He added "The last thing is (former staffer) Olivia Gondek. It said I want to eat her pussy. I've never said that in my life to her. I would never do that. I'm happily married. I've got more than enough to eat at home."
  - Ford later admits to "driving after taking a drink". "I might have had some drinks and driven, that's absolutely wrong", he told the National Post's Natalie Alcoba. To other reporters, Ford said "I’m not perfect. Maybe you are but I’m not. I'm sure none of you have ever had a drink and gotten behind the wheel."
  - Ford's remarks are made while wearing a Toronto Argonauts football jersey. The club issues a press release stating that it is "disappointed" that Ford made his remarks while wearing the jersey.
  - Ford makes a noon-time appearance before the press with his wife Renata. He apologizes for the graphic language he used and asks that the media leave his family alone. Ford also states that he is getting assistance from "health-care professionals." Councillor John Parker states that Ford was using his wife "as a convenient prop".
  - An Ipsos Reid poll commissioned by CTV News, CP24 and Newstalk 1010 Radio finds that 62% of Toronto voters would not vote for Ford under any circumstances. In potential municipal election scenarios against Olivia Chow, John Tory, Karen Stintz and David Soknacki, Ford would place no better than third. Ford's job approval rating among Torontonians did not change at 40%, and was higher in the former suburbs of Etobicoke and Scarborough.
  - The Sun News Network cable television network announces that Rob Ford and Doug Ford will host a new Ford Nation television show, starting, November 18, 2013.
  - Ford Motor Company tells Bloomberg News reporters that they did not authorize Mayor Ford's use of their logo in Ford Nation t-shirts.
  - Ontario Premier Kathleen Wynne announces that the Government of Ontario is ready to intervene if City Council is unanimous in requesting it, and if all three provincial parties agree. The intervention would be in the form of new powers to be used by Toronto City Council.
  - Ford's antics were once again publicized on late night shows by Jon Stewart, David Letterman, Jimmy Kimmel, Jimmy Fallon, Stephen Colbert and Jay Leno.
  - City spokespeople confirm that school trips to City Hall in the next week will be redirected to the City of Toronto Archives, for safety concerns.
- November 15
  - Toronto City Council votes to strip Mayor Ford of executive committee and emergency powers. Ford states that he will challenge the action in court.
  - Before the council meeting, Ford gives each of his staff a $5,000 raise.
  - Councillor Minnan-Wong said he was considering the concept of "asking the province to consider the mayor's seat vacant and moving up the date of the election for mayor", but noted he doubted there was an appetite.
  - On Ford's admission of drinking and driving, Newfoundland distillery Iceberg Vodka releases a general statement describing the practice as "unacceptable and inexcusable behavior." Ford is listed in police reports as having drunk the alcohol in a city park with Alexander "Sandro" Lisi.

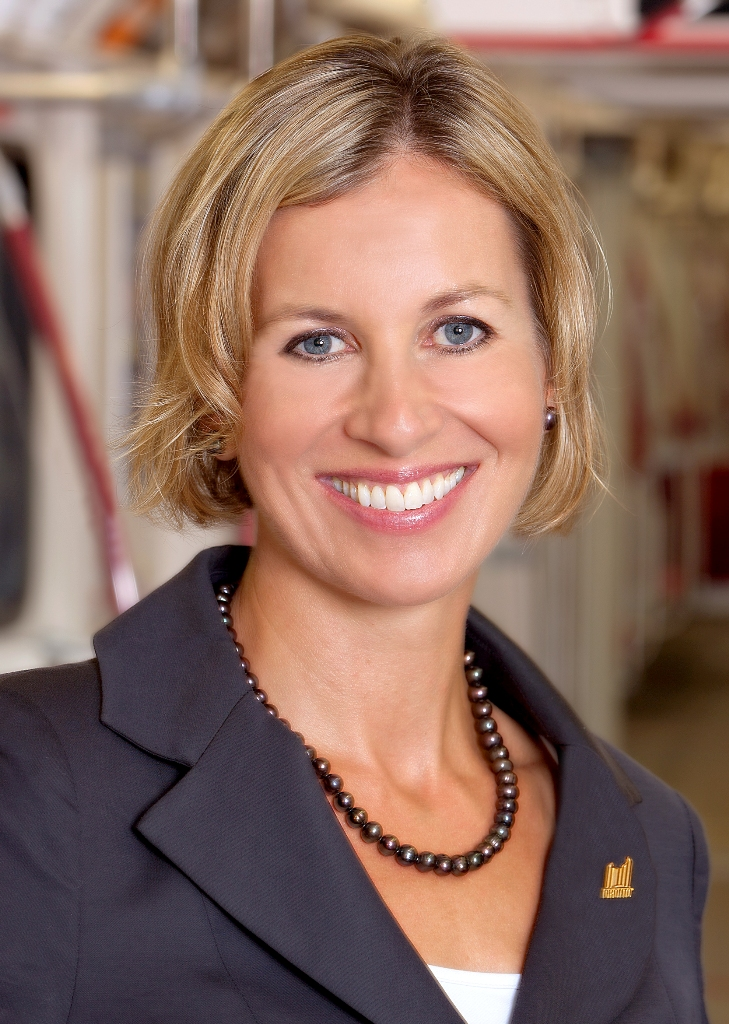
Karen Stintz

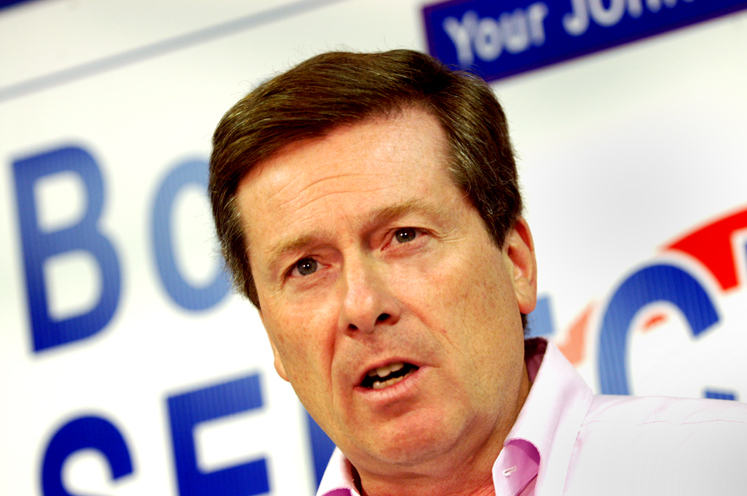
John Tory

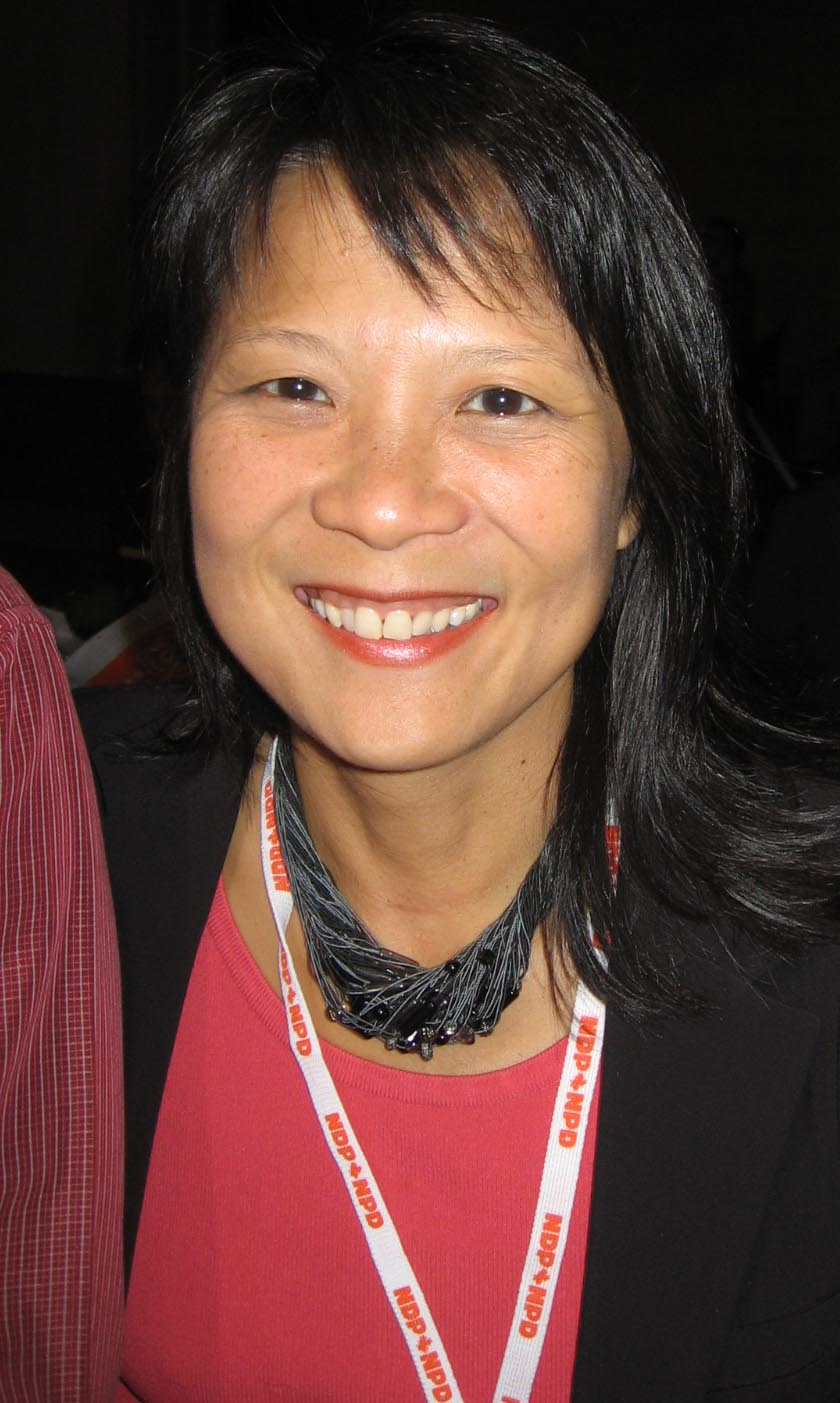
Olivia Chow

The four candidates in the election scenarios.
- November 16 Ford is lampooned in the cold open of Saturday Night Live, being portrayed by Bobby Moynihan.

- Exiting Deco Labels on Saturday evening, Councillor Ford sees what he believes is a Toronto Police surveillance vehicle; this incident is mentioned on Ford Nation, filmed the next day.

- November 17 Ford records interviews with US television networks CNN and Fox News Channel. To Fox News, Ford states that "one day I do want to run for Prime Minister" and reiterates he has no plans to step down as Mayor. The Fords also record the first episode of their Ford Nation television program.

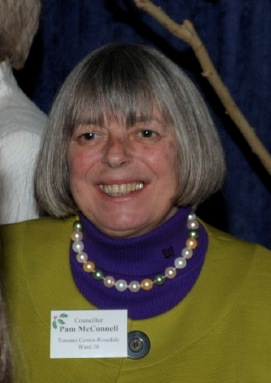
Councillor Pam McConnell, 2011.

- November 18 Toronto City Council votes to strip Mayor Ford of executive and budgetary powers, and assign them to Deputy Mayor Norm Kelly and the City Clerk. Ford and his brother Doug get into a verbal altercation with members of the public in the Council chamber. Ford compares the moves by Council to "invading Kuwait", and promises to fight the whole Council in the next municipal election. During the meeting, Ford knocks down Councillor Pam McConnell, while his brother was arguing with a spectator. Reports suggest McConnell was left with a fat lip from the altercation.

- Judge Nordheimer denies the request by Khattack to view the 'crack' video. Nordheimer describes the two videos in the possession of the police as separate but "what is revealed in the second video relates back to the first video".
- After the council meeting, Ford does an interview with CBC's Peter Mansbridge, stating he is finished with drinking. "If you don't see a difference in me in five months, then I'll eat my words. I've had a come-to-Jesus moment if you want to call it that. I've let my dad down, I know he's upstairs watching this."
- The first episode of Ford Nation, featuring Rob and Doug Ford, debuts on Sun News Network. Its first airing is seen by 155,000 viewers, with another 45,000 in a repeat Western Canada broadcast, and 65,000 video downloads. It becomes the all-time top rated program on the network. The Ford brothers state they believe they remain under police surveillance.

- November 19 A police document released in the extortion charge against Lisi details further information about the video. The document states that Ford is "consuming what appears to be a narcotic" and "the Mayor was apparently in the company of several individuals at the time of the recording" and that the video was made "surreptitiously" in February 2013. The case alleges that Lisi made threatening phone calls to Liban Siyad and Mohamed Siad in May 2013.

- Sun News Network cancels Ford Nation after one episode. The production took eight times the resources of a normal hour on the network. Sun News invites the Fords to appear on their other shows, given the record ratings for their program.

- Canadian government Employment Minister Jason Kenney calls for Ford's resignation. The call caused Canadian Finance Minister Jim Flaherty, who considers himself 'a personal friend' of Ford, to swear at Kenney and have to be physically restrained by colleagues.

- November 20 An analysis of the Ipsos Reid poll shows that support for Ford has dropped to 16% in his home base of Etobicoke, the same as downtown, while he is more popular in the former York and East York (30%) and Scarborough (27%) areas of Toronto. The data also showed that 44% of respondents without a high school diploma support Ford, while only 17% of university graduates do. Those earning less than $40,000 per year are twice as likely to support Ford as those with higher incomes.
- November 25 Hampton, Florida's mayor Barry Layne Moore is arrested by the county sheriff on charges of possession of drugs and selling drugs. According to the Bradford County Sheriff Gordon Smith, "This isn’t Toronto. We will not tolerate illegal drug activity in my jurisdiction by anyone to include our elected officials."
- November 27 Justice Ian Nordheimer rules that the remaining content in the documents of the Ford and Lisi investigation are to be released to the public on December 6. The delay in the release is to allow for appeals to higher courts.
- November 28 Canadian news magazine Maclean's chooses Ford as "Newsmaker of the Year".

- Doug Ford tells Newstalk 1010 that he and his brother are readying a YouTube show, for launch around Christmas. He also says that he and his brother have been approached by American production companies about appearing in their own reality TV show.

=== December ===
- December 4 Transcripts of wiretaps related to the Lisi investigation are released. Taped conversations allege that Ford offered $5,000 and a new car in exchange for the video, weeks before the stories about the video are published by Gawker and the Toronto Star. In other conversations, Mohamed Siad discusses selling the video with Siyadin Abdi for $150,000 to the "Star or the other website." In another, Elena Basso calls Siad to say that Ford is at 15 Windsor Road, and Siad should bring drugs. That same evening, a conversation alleges that Ford is using heroin. Both Rob and Doug Ford decline to comment on the new allegations.
- December 5 Rob Ford takes part in The Sports Junkies, a sports radio show on Washington, D.C. radio station, WJFK-FM. Asked about the latest revelations, Ford describes them as an "outright lie." He refuses to answer any question on the topic, saying they should ask his lawyer.
- December 6 Toronto Sun publishes an interview with Councillor McConnell, who says headaches, shoulder pain, and neck pain persist, even after spending "a lot of time with chiropractors and massage therapists." Ford knocked over McConnell during a November council meeting. She tells The Sun that she has not ruled out legal action.
- December 9 In an appearance on television with Conrad Black, Ford claims that the police used Lisi as a prop to get him, although Ford declined to explain his meetings with Lisi. Ford also said that he was mad at Police Chief Blair, saying "I definitely think this is political. Am I happy with the chief? No, I'm not right now." Ford stated that he was no longer drinking and offered to take a urine test, although Black pointed out "Rob, there is absolutely no need to do a urine test right now."

- Ford also insinuated that Toronto Star reporter Daniel Dale, whom he confronted behind his home is a pedophile, saying "Daniel Dale is in my backyard taking pictures. I have little kids. He’s taking pictures of little kids, I don’t want to say that word but you start thinking what this guy is all about."

- December 11 Police Chief Blair states that the investigation of Ford was not politically motivated or connected to a Ford demand for a 10% budget cut in the police budget of 2012. Blair is also asked about "Project Brazen 2", the investigation of Ford, but only comments that he "cannot comment on an ongoing investigation."
- December 12 Responding to Ford's accusations that he is a pedophile, reporter Daniel Dale serves Mayor Ford a notice of libel, threatening a lawsuit if he does not apologize. Ford, in a press conference, when asked about the insinuation said "I stand by my words, what I said with Conrad Black" adding "If you watch the interview, you’ll know what I said."

== 2014 ==
=== January ===
- January 21 The Toronto government releases 5,000 pages of Ford staff e-mails from the dates when Gawker publicized the video. CNN reporter Paula Newton first asked the mayor's office about the video at 11:15 a.m. on May 16, before Gawker published its blog entry that evening. She later spoke with George Christopoulos about the video. The e-mails showed that the whereabouts of Ford were not known that evening and most of the next day.

- A new video surfaces of Rob Ford, intoxicated, rambling in a restaurant in Rexdale about "counter-surveillance" and Police Chief Bill Blair. He uses a heavy Jamaican accent while doing so and appears to utter the Jamaican patois profanity "bumbaclot" multiple times. Ford later admitted that he was drinking in the video. Ford refused to answer a reporter's question if he was using drugs that night.
- Later in the day, a second video emerged which showed Ford meeting with Sandro Lisi, a friend of Ford's who has been charged with extortion in connection with the "crack video".
- Ford's antics were also lampooned by television comedian Jimmy Kimmel.

- January 23 On the game show Jeopardy!, the Jeopardy board included the following $800 clue under the category Scandal: "In 2013, Rob Ford, mayor of this 4th-largest city in N. America first said he smoked weed, not crack... then, yes, ok, crack, too." A contestant correctly replied "What is Toronto."
- January 29 In an interview with The Toronto Sun, Ford denies allegations he was involved in the death of Anthony Smith, who was shot to death March 28, 2013. Another story reemerged in the media, relating to the 2012 jailhouse beating of Scott MacIntyre, a known drug dealer, who was allegedly beaten to keep secrets about Ford's drug use. MacIntyre has filed a lawsuit against Ford.

=== February ===
- February 26 Chief Blair reveals in interviews with Toronto media, that when Lisi was arrested on October 31, Lisi told investigators that Doug Ford would file a conflict-of-interest complaint against the Chief, saying "your boss is going to get his this weekend". The following week, Doug Ford started making complaints about Blair to the media. Doug Ford would go on and file the formal complaint in February 2014. Ford responded that he would add the latest comments by Blair to his complaint. Ford maintained that he did not tell anyone that he would file the complaint, when Lisi was arrested in October 2013.
- February 27 Rob Ford challenges the police chief to arrest him. Ford tells reporters "if he's going to arrest me, arrest me. I've done nothing wrong, and he's wasted millions of dollars. I want him to come clean and say how much money did it cost the taxpayers for surveillance on me and the planes that he had to rent."

=== March ===
- March 3 Ford is a guest on Jimmy Kimmel Live! in Los Angeles. Kimmel proceeds to ask questions and lampoon Ford on his substance abuse, alleged racism, drunk driving, alleged homophobia and alleged domestic abuse. Ford responded to Kimmel saying "I wasn't elected to be perfect". Ford later complained that the interview was a "set up".
- March 5 Oversight of the ongoing Toronto Police investigation into Ford and Lisi, entitled "Brazen 2", is transferred to the Ontario Provincial Police (OPP). The transfer is done at the request of Police Chief Blair.
- March 19 Police documents describing the video of Ford smoking crack are unsealed: "At one point Mayor Ford holds the glass cylinder in his mouth, lights the lighter and applies the flame to the tip of the glass cylinder in a circular motion. After several seconds, Mayor Ford appears to inhale the vapour which is produced, then exhale the vapour."

- Reporters attempt to get comments from Mayor Ford, who runs through the lobby of Toronto City Hall to his office without commenting on the revelations. Jimmy Kimmel later described it as a "one-man stampede."

=== April to November ===
- April 30 A second video of Ford smoking crack cocaine, reportedly recorded in the early hours on Saturday, April 26, emerges and is reviewed by reporters from The Globe and Mail. The Globe releases a description and a screenshot from the video. Ford's lawyer announces Ford will be taking a leave of absence from his campaign temporarily to enter rehab.
- May 1 Ford leaves town, for a rehabilitation program. Initially intending to check into a facility in Chicago, Ford voluntarily turned back at the border and entered the GreeneStone rehabilitation facility in Bala, Ontario.
- June 30 Ford returns to office after a two-month leave of absence in rehab.
- September 12 Ford suddenly withdrew his candidacy for mayor. His brother Doug Ford takes his place.
- September 17 The media confirmed that Ford was diagnosed with cancer.
- November 30 Ford's term as mayor ends.

== 2015 ==
=== April to May ===
- April 16 Ontario Court justice orders Lisi to be tried for extortion in Superior Court.
- May 8 Ontario Court justice dismisses drug charges against Lisi and second person. (Originally charged October 1, 2013.)

== 2016 ==
=== March ===
- March 22 Rob Ford dies at the age of 46, 18 months after being diagnosed with a malignant liposarcoma, a type of cancer.
- March 22 Ford's office made an official statement about Ford's death.

=== August ===
- August 11 The original video of Ford smoking crack was released by the Toronto Police Service after the extortion charge against Sandro Lisi was dropped.

== Ford's mayorship staff ==
Twenty office staff reported to Rob Ford on May 16, 2013. In the months following the report of the video, eleven staff left his office and were replaced. On November 19, eleven of the current staff were transferred to the deputy mayor's office.

- Mark Towhey, chief of staff – fired May 23
- George Christopolous, director of communications – quit May 27
- Isaac Ransom, special assistant – communications – quit May 27
- Brian Johnston, policy advisor & council relations – quit May 30
- Kia Nejatian, executive assistant to the mayor – quit May 30
- Michael Prempeh, special assistant – quit May 31
- Christopher Fickel, acting executive assistant to the chief of staff – quit June 26
- Carley McNeil, special assistant – event coordinator – confirmed no longer working August 8
- Brooks Barnett, policy advisor & council relations – quit November 6
- Sanjin Petrujkic, senior policy advisor & director of council affairs, promoted to deputy chief of staff & director of council relations – transferred to deputy mayor's office November 19
- Earl Provost, director of stakeholder & council relations, promoted to chief of staff – transferred to deputy mayor's office November 19
- Brendan Croskerry, special assistant, promoted to executive assistant to the chief of staff – transferred to deputy mayor's office November 19, quit Early 2014
- Rob Krauss, special assistant, promoted to policy advisor & council relations – transferred to deputy mayor's office November 19
- Victoria Colussi, special assistant – remained with the mayor's office as manager, protocol and events, November 19
- Xhejsi Hasko, special assistant – remained with the mayor's office November 19
- Dan Jacobs, special assistant, promoted to executive assistant to the mayor, remained with the mayor's office as chief of staff, November 19
- Jonathan Kent, special assistant – remained with the mayor's office November 19
- Christine Maydossian, special assistant – remained with the mayor's office November 19
- David Price, director of operations and logistics – terminated November 20
- Thomas Beyer, special assistant – remained with the mayor's office November 19, resigned March 7, 2014 for medical reasons

== See also ==
- Crazy Town: The Rob Ford Story, 2014 biography by Robyn Doolittle
- Rob Ford conflict of interest trial
- Crisis communication
- Marion Barry, former mayor of Washington, DC, who was caught smoking crack on video in a 1990 sting operation
