= Amin Massoudi =

Canadian political staffer

Amin Massoudi (born 1988) is a Canadian political staffer. He has worked as the communications director for Toronto Mayor Rob Ford, and as the deputy chief of staff and principal secretary to Ontario Premier Doug Ford. He chaired the Progressive Conservative Party of Ontario's 2022 re-election campaign.

== Education ==
Massoudi attended Queens University at Kingston, where he studied at the faculty of arts and science.

== Career ==
After graduation, Massoudi worked for Mayor of Toronto, Rob Ford, including as his communications director In 2013, he denied allegations reported by Vice News that he had hired a hacker to destroy a video that showed Rob Ford smoking crack cocaine.

After his time working for Rob Ford, Massoudi worked as strategic adviser with Amir Remtulla & Associates and also as a senior consultant with Capitol Hill Group. Massoudi then worked as an executive assistant for Toronto City Councillor Doug Ford. In 2019, when Doug Ford was the Ontario Premier, Massoudi was promoted from his deputy chief of staff to his principal secretary. During the 2022 Ontario general election, Massoudi was the chair of the Progressive Conservative Party of Ontario's re-election campaign.

In July 2022, the Toronto Star reported that Massoudi is leaving his government job to work in the private sector.

== Personal life ==
In March 2014, Massoudi took a career break to get cancer treatment. His lymph nodes were removed during surgery at Toronto General Hospital.
