= Nick Kouvalis =

Canadian political consultant and strategist

Chief of Staff to the Mayor of Toronto
- In office October 2010 – February 2011
- Mayor: Rob Ford

Personal details
- Born: Nectarios Kouvalis; 1975 (age 50–51) Windsor, Ontario, Canada
- Occupation: Political consultant

Nectarios "Nick" Kouvalis (born 1975) is a Canadian political consultant and strategist. He is a principal strategist of Campaign Research, a firm which he co-founded in 2008 with Richard Ciano (a former executive of the Conservative Party of Canada and Progressive Conservative Party of Ontario).

== Political career ==
=== Rob Ford campaign and mayoralty ===
Kouvalis managed Rob Ford's successful campaign to win the 2010 Toronto mayoral election. He is often credited with the success of the campaign, referred to as "the most improbable mayoral win in Canadian history."

He was appointed Ford's chief of staff in October 2010, overseeing the transition and initial months of Ford's mayoralty, but stepped down in February 2011 citing the need to spend more time with his family. Ford's brother, Councillor Doug Ford, said that Kouvalis remained "loyal" to the brothers and would continue to be a senior advisor.

Kouvalis and Campaign Research were later hired in 2011 by the Toronto Professional Firefighter's Association "Not Gravy" campaign, which opposed Ford's proposed cuts to the Toronto Fire Services. Campaign Research provided public opinion research and campaign support services while another firm, Sussex Strategies, was hired to engage in public affairs work with city councillors.

=== Work in British Columbia ===
Following the success of Ford's campaign in Toronto, Kouvalis and Campaign Research were hired by British Columbia premier Christy Clark's BC Liberal campaign in the 2013 British Columbia election.

Campaign Research was also hired by the centre-right Non-Partisan Association for the 2011 Vancouver municipal election, where NPA candidate Suzanne Anton was attempting to replace incumbent mayor Gregor Robertson of Vision Vancouver.

=== John Tory ===
Kouvalis was the chief strategist for John Tory's successful campaign to replace Rob Ford in the 2014 Toronto mayoral election. Tory's campaign manager Tom Allison described Kouvalis as the campaign's "Ford Whisperer", helping the Tory campaign anticipate Ford's actions and responses. He later was a member of Tory's transition team under chief of staff Case Ootes.

=== Andrew Scheer ===
After the 2019 election, The Globe and Mail reported that Kouvalis was hired by then Conservative leader Andrew Scheer as part of the efforts to help elect delegates sympathetic for an upcoming leadership review. Scheer later resigned.

== Controversies ==
In 2007, Kouvalis was acquitted in the Ontario Court of Justice for allegedly uttering a death threat against Jeff Watson, a Conservative Party of Canada Member of Parliament. Kouvalis was accused of saying if he could kill Watson "with [his] bare hands and get away with it, I would," on July 13, 2005 while he was serving as campaign manager to Conservative candidate Rick Fuschi. Justice Lloyd Dean concluded that the words were simply an "expression of frustration" and merely spoken in the heat of the moment, which often occurs in politics.

In 2011, Kouvalis' firm received a few complaints through the Marketing Research and Intelligence Association over phone calls in the Montreal electoral riding of Mount Royal. Complaints suggested that Campaign Research had incorrectly implied to voters that Irwin Cotler was about to retire. Kouvalis denied any wrongdoing, and stated, "We’re in the business of getting Conservatives elected and ending Liberal careers. We’re good at it”. Kouvalis also welcomed any scrutiny from the MRIA.

On November 28, 2012, the Toronto Star reported an investigation by the MRIA about the Mount Royal controversy. The MRIA concluded that the actions of Campaign Research Inc., brought the industry into disrepute. “The actions of Campaign Research have likely caused the Canadian public to lose confidence in marketing research and have tarnished the image of the marketing research profession,” says a ruling by three-member panel of the Market Research and Intelligence Association. The calls were not of concern to the association, but the ongoing strategic use of Campaign Research's Gold Seal membership in the MRIA brought the action by the group. The MRIA welcomed Campaign Research to still continue their membership in the association.

In April 2016, Kouvalis was arrested for drunk driving.

Kouvalis resigned as manager of Kellie Leitch's Conservative leadership campaign in February 2017 after he became the focus of media coverage for a series of posts on Twitter calling Emmett Macfarlane, a University of Waterloo political science professor, a "cuck" and a "traitor" after Macfarlane criticized Leitch's proposed policies and compared her to Donald Trump. Kouvalis later deleted the posts and issued an apology to Macfarlane. In the statement announcing his resignation from Leitch's campaign, Kouvalis said that "when a member of a campaign team becomes the focus of media coverage, the time comes to resign."

On September 26, 2017, Kouvalis and Sarah Warry-Poljanski, a former Progressive Conservative Party of Ontario nomination candidate who lost the PC nomination only hours earlier were arrested and charged with break and entry into a Kelseys Original Roadhouse and for being intoxicated.

On March 21, 2025, Kouvalis, and Campaign Research Inc., were censured and expelled by the Canadian Research Insights Council for "Public Statements which Tend to Bring the Industry into Disrepute" and "Failure to Include Required Disclosures in Public Statements."
