= Robyn Doolittle =

Canadian journalist (born 1984)

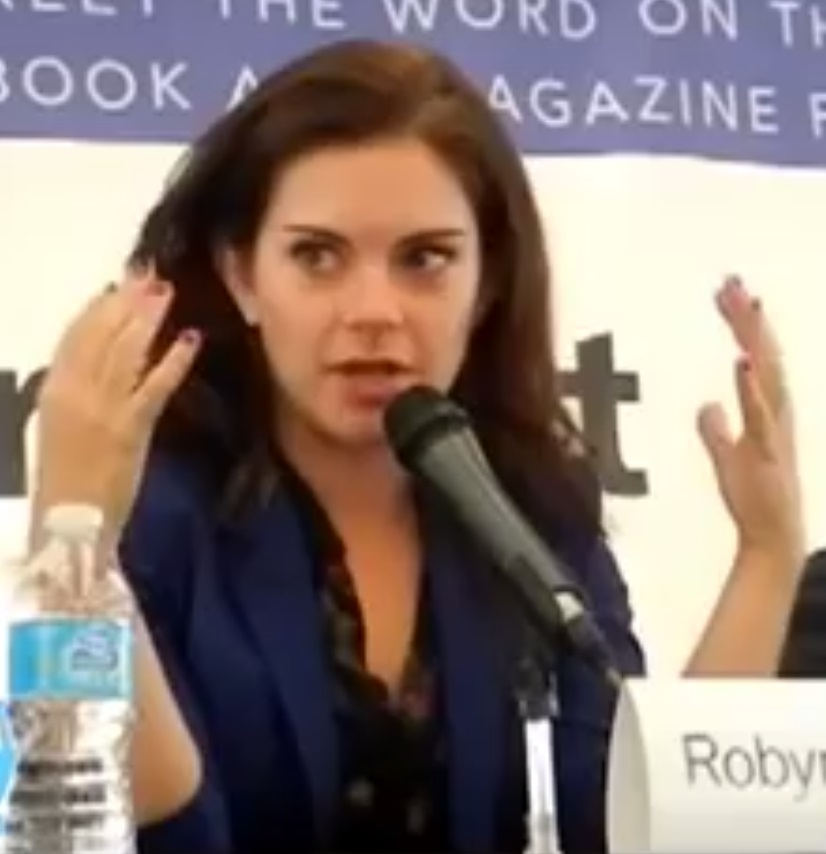
- Doolittle in 2012
- Born: 13 September 1984 (age 41); Sarnia, Ontario, Canada
- Education: Toronto Metropolitan University (formerly Ryerson University)
- Occupation: Journalist
- Years active: 2010–present
- Employer(s): Toronto Star (2005, 2010–2014); The Globe and Mail (2014–present)
- Children: 2

Robyn Doolittle (born 13 September 1984) is a Canadian investigative reporter for The Globe and Mail.

At the Toronto Star, she became well known for covering Toronto mayor Rob Ford's political and personal life, which led to her authoring the biography Crazy Town: The Rob Ford Story (2014). At The Globe, her focus has been on sexual assault cases deemed "unfounded" by police in Canada.

== Early life and education ==
Doolittle was born in 1984 in Sarnia, Ontario, and grew up in Forest, Ontario, where her mother worked in human resources and her father worked for Eaton's building window displays. As a high school student, Doolittle was actively involved in numerous extracurricular activities and wrote a column for the Sarnia Observer. Though she originally intended to study theatre, Doolittle has traced her desire to work in journalism from an experience at her high school prom where she felt that the police unfairly profiled her First Nations boyfriend.

Doolittle was accepted into Ryerson University's journalism program in 2002, and from 2006 to 2007 she served as editor-in-chief of The Eyeopener, one of Ryerson's two weekly student newspapers. While editor-in-chief, she clashed with a professor who cut the newspaper's staff and ran a headline attacking the professor.

== Journalism career ==
=== 2010–2014: Toronto Star and coverage of Rob Ford ===
While a university student, Doolittle was hired as a summer intern at the Toronto Star. After helping to cover the trial of Conrad Black in Chicago, Doolittle was hired back as a full-year intern and then a staff reporter. Doolittle originally covered crime for the paper, but in 2010 was assigned to cover Toronto City Council. In 2013, Doolittle wrote a story with fellow reporter Kevin Donovan alleging that Rob Ford had been asked to leave the Garrison Ball, a military gala, because he was heavily intoxicated. Ford strongly denied this allegation.

In part because of her role in writing the Garrison Ball story, she was approached by Mohamed Farah and Mohamed Siad, alleged members of the Dixon Bloods, about a video they had showing Rob Ford smoking crack cocaine. Doolittle was shown the video by Siad on a cell phone, but he refused to give it to the Star unless he was paid $100,000. After Siad also tried to sell the video to John Cook from Gawker, Gawker released a story about the video thus essentially forcing the Star to run their story shortly after. Ford denied smoking crack cocaine and the existence of the video, but he later admitted that he had smoked crack cocaine at least once after the existence of the video was confirmed by Toronto Police Chief Bill Blair.

In April 2014, Doolittle left the Toronto Star to take a position as investigative reporter with The Globe and Mail (Toronto). In her blog, she acknowledged her time and experiences at the Star, calling it "an amazing paper," and welcomed her opportunity to gain new experiences and learn from new associates at The Globe and Mail.

==== Crazy Town ====
Based on the notability of the Rob Ford crack video and her personal role in investigating it, Doolittle was offered a book deal by Penguin Books, but was given only three months to write the manuscript. Titled Crazy Town: The Rob Ford Story, the book was released in Canada and the United States in February 2014. The book immediately reached the top of Amazon Canada's bestseller list. In early February 2014, film producers Daniel Iron and Lance Samuels announced they had purchased the movie rights to Crazy Town. After the video was released by the Toronto Police Services, Doolittle acknowledged that she had recalled some details of the video incorrectly.

On July 8, 2015, online retailer Kobo honoured Doolittle with its first annual non-fiction Kobo Emerging Writer Prize for Crazy Town. The prize came with a $10,000 cash award, and marketing assistance.

=== 2014–present: The Globe and Mail ===
At The Globe, Doolittle led a 20-month investigation which determined that 1 in 5 sexual assault cases in Canada is closed by police as "unfounded". As they are not reported to Statistics Canada, this artificially reduces the number of reports. In response to Doolittle's 2017 article, 37,272 cases were reviewed by various police departments, and over 400 were reopened including 23 cases in the Canadian Armed Forces.

In September 2018, the man who had raped the first victim that Doolittle interviewed for her investigation was sentenced to jail after having his case reopened. After police surveillance collected a sample of the man's DNA, they were able to match it with the victim's child, which had not been done before because the detective had accepted the man's claim that he was sterile at face value. The victim's lawyer, who is an expert on "unfounded" cases said that it was the first time he had seen such a case result in the criminal being brought to justice.

In January 2024, Doolittle moved from The Globe and Mail's investigative team to cover corporate law for the newspaper.

== Personal life ==
Doolittle is a vegetarian. As of 2013, Doolittle lived in a condo in the Parkdale area of Toronto with her two Pomeranians.

Doolittle married her husband, a teacher, in January 2016. They have two daughters.

== See also ==
- Timeline of Rob Ford video scandal
