= Crazy Town: The Rob Ford Story =

2014 book by Robyn Doolittle

- Cover of the first edition, February 2014
- Author: Robyn Doolittle
- Language: English
- Genre: Biography
- Published: 3 February 2014 (Viking Canada/Penguin)
- Publication place: Canada
- Media type: Print (hardcover)
- Pages: 304
- ISBN: 978-0670068111
- OCLC: 864545657

Crazy Town: The Rob Ford Story is a 2014 biography by Robyn Doolittle concerning Toronto mayor Rob Ford and his 2013 scandal of a leaked video of him using drugs.

== Synopsis ==
The book describes the controversial political career of Rob Ford who was elected as a Toronto city councillor in 2000, then mayor in 2010. Doolittle was a Toronto Star reporter who with fellow reporter Kevin Donovan witnessed a video of Ford in which the mayor smoked crack. The chapters describe Ford's career as a city councillor for Etobicoke, his controversial statements and actions and his election as Toronto's mayor. The latter portions of the book describe the initial reports of the crack video and the subsequent consequences, concluding with Ford's November 2013 admission that he had smoked crack cocaine. Doolittle also describes how the Rob Ford stories developed at the Star, whose editors exercised considerable caution in these reports.

== Publication ==
Doolittle researched and wrote Crazy Town in a time frame of three months. The book was released on 3 February 2014 by Viking Canada, an imprint of Penguin Press. The book was originally scheduled to be released in March 2014.

Doolittle's media appearances following the book's publication included interviews by Anderson Cooper on CNN, Jian Ghomeshi on Q and Jon Stewart on The Daily Show. She also discussed her book on Late Night with Seth Meyers.

== Adaptation ==
A week after Crazy Town's release, Toronto company Blue Ice Pictures announced its purchase of the film adaptation rights to the book.

== Reception ==
A review from Quill & Quire noted that the book did not "engage in a serious examination of the culture of celebrity that has allowed Rob Ford to survive and, to some extent, flourish" although the review noted the merits of the book's version of how the Rob Ford story was developed at the Toronto Star. The National Post review noted the book contained occasions of "wishy-washiness" and that the book seemed premature as "an attempt to pin down a man with plenty more skeletons left jiggling in his closet."

The book reached the top spot of Amazon.ca's best sellers chart within a week of its release. Crazy Town also topped the Globe and Mail hardcover non-fiction bestseller list and entered in fourth position on Maclean's non-fiction bestseller list.

On July 8, 2015, online retailer Kobo honoured Doolittle with its first annual non-fiction Kobo Emerging Writer Prize for Crazy Town.

== See also ==
- Rob Ford conflict of interest trial
- Timeline of Rob Ford video scandal
- Run This Town, a film discussing the scandal
