= Rob Ford conflict of interest trial =

The Rob Ford conflict of interest trial was a civil action by Paul Magder versus Toronto Mayor Rob Ford, held in Toronto, Ontario, Canada. The action began in March 2012 and finally concluded in June 2013, including a trial in September 2012 and an appeal in January 2013. Under Ontario law, politicians are required to disclose conflicts of interest and excuse themselves from votes at municipal government councils. Magder alleged that Ford had broken the Ontario law by voting at Toronto City Council on a motion of paying back money that Ford had raised for his private football foundation. The initial trial judge found Ford guilty and ordered removed by office, allowing the decision to be stayed and appealed. The appeal court found that Ford did violate the conflict of interest law, but the vote of Council itself was not in order, as demanding that Ford pay back the money was beyond the penalties allowed by Ontario law. The case was appealed to the Supreme Court of Canada, but the Supreme Court chose not to listen to the appeal, allowing the appeals court judgment to stand and Ford remain mayor.

If Ford had been removed, he would have been the first Toronto mayor removed from office. Ford is the only Toronto mayor who has been found in conflict of interest. The trial raised several issues related to the Ontario law of conflict-of-interest. The only penalty is removal from office. Another is that the law's disallowal of a person to speak on an issue directly affecting that person denies that person the right to speak in defence.

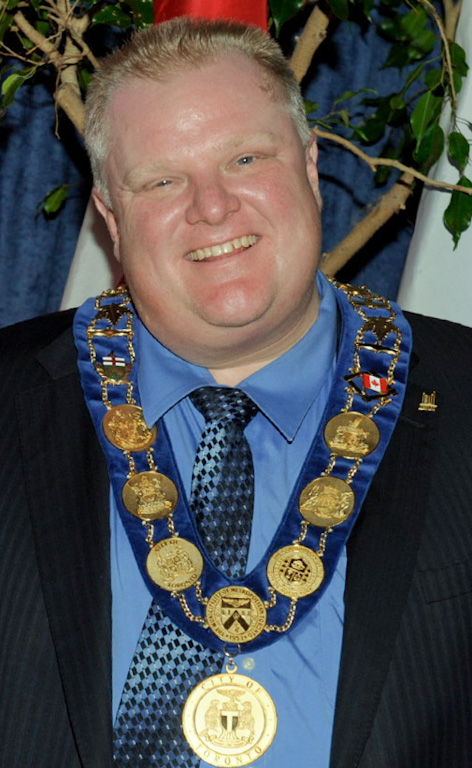
Rob Ford

== Chronology ==
In August 2010, the City of Toronto's Integrity Commissioner Janet Leiper ruled that Councillor Ford had not followed City Council's Code of Conduct and had abused his council position by using official letterhead and other council resources in fund-raising letters for his football foundation and had raised approximately $40,000 for the foundation. In the report, the commissioner had noted that donors had included lobbyists, clients of lobbyists and a corporation which did business with the City of Toronto. Ford had accepted $3,150 on behalf of the foundation from these donors. and the commissioner indicated that Ford should pay back this money. Ford indicated that he would challenge the report at Council, stating that he was being treated unfairly. He publicly asked "why the integrity commissioner doesn't investigate the $12,000 retirement party for Kyle Rae or the $6,000 French lessons for Adam Giambrone. Or better yet, why not that Tuggs deal, that 20-year lease behind closed doors. Why doesn't she investigate that?"

On August 25, 2010, City Council debated the integrity commissioner's report. Ford participated in the report discussion and the vote after being warned by then-Council Speaker Sandra Bussin that he was in a potential conflict of interest. Council agreed with the commissioner and voted 26–10 for Ford to return the money. In the months following the meeting, Ford discussed the repayment with his donors. Several did not want repayment and Ford forwarded letters from several donors expressing their wishes to the integrity commissioner. By February 2012, Ford had not paid the amount and the matter was raised at a February 7, 2012 City Council meeting.

Ford spoke and voted at the February 7 meeting: "[A]nd if it wasn't for this foundation, these kids would not have a chance. And then to ask for me to pay it out of my own pocket personally, there is just, there is no sense to this. The money is gone, the money has been spent on football equipment ..." City Council voted on a motion "[t]hat City Council rescind the previous decision made under Item CC52.1 and direct that no further action be taken on this matter", which carried by majority, 22 voting Yes, 12 No, with 11 absent.

In March 2012, a complaint was filed by Paul Magder, a Torontonian, alleging that Ford's actions at the February 2012 Council meeting had violated the Ontario Municipal Conflict of Interest Act (MCIA). The lawsuit came to trial in Ontario Superior Court on September 5, 2012. The case was argued on Magder's behalf by Toronto civil rights lawyer Clayton Ruby, who represented him pro bono. Ruby argued that Ford had clearly violated the act by "having spoke to and voted on a matter in which he allegedly had a pecuniary interest ... contravening s. (5)1 of the MCIA and an order was sought under s. 10(1) of the MCIA declaring his seat on Toronto City Council vacant." Ford's defense was that the MCIA did not apply to Toronto City Council's Code of Conduct; that the Council Resolution was ultra vires to Council's powers under the City of Toronto Act and therefore null; that the amount was insignificant, and that the contravention of the MCIA was committed through inadvertence or by reason of error in judgment.

During the trial, Ruby argued Ford was "reckless" and "wilfully ignorant" of the law when he did not remove himself from the debate and vote. Ford testified he never read the MCIA or a City of Toronto councillor orientation handbook which included a section on conflicts of interest. Also, he did not attend City Council training sessions that covered conflicts of interest. The mayoralty oath of office includes a pledge to "disclose conflicts of interest", and when asked by Ruby if he understood the words, Ford said: "No. My interpretation of a conflict of interest, again, is it takes two parties and the city must benefit or a member of council must benefit." Ruby argued that "as mayor he ought to have had a clear understanding of his obligations. This entire pattern of conduct shows that he chose to remain ignorant, and substituted his own view for that of the law." Ford disagreed, stating he only acted in the best interest of high school students. The trial concluded on September 6 with no immediate judgment and the judge promised "to deliver the ruling in a timely fashion."

Ontario Superior Court Judge Hackland's ruling was released on November 26, 2012. Hackland found that Ford had violated the MCIA and declared his seat vacant, the decision to take effect in 14 days. In his decision, Hackland disagreed with all of Ford's legal arguments. In his disposition, Hackland stated: "Ford's actions were not done by reason of inadvertence or of a good faith error in judgment. I am, therefore, required by s. 10(1)(a) of the MCIA to declare the respondent's seat vacant. In view of the significant mitigating circumstances surrounding the respondent's actions ... I decline to impose any further disqualification from holding office beyond the current term." Opinions differed on whether the ruling allowed Ford to run in a by-election should Council order one to fill the vacancy. According to the City Solicitor, the ruling disallowed Ford from holding office again until 2014, the next term of office. However, on November 30, Judge Hackland clarified his order, and did not bar Ford from running in a by-election, should one be held before 2014.

After the ruling, Ford announced that he would appeal. "I'm a fighter. Sometimes you win some, sometimes you lose some. I've done lots of great work for the city ... This comes down to left-wing politics. The left-wing wants me out of here and they will do anything in their power to and I'm going to fight tooth and nail to hold onto my job and if they do for some reason get me out, then I'll be running right back at 'em soon as the next election is, if there's a by-election I'll have my name the first one on the ballot." Ford was granted a stay of the decision on December 5, and remained mayor during his appeal.

On January 27, 2013, the Superior Court upheld Ford's appeal. The judges declared that the original judge had erred because the financial judgment was not under the City of Toronto Act or the Council Code of Conduct. Further, the sanction was beyond the authority of the City Council to enact. Although Ford won the appeal, the appeals court disallowed Ford's claim for $116,000 in legal costs.

Ruby filed an appeal of the decision to the Canadian Supreme Court, but the Court declined to hear the appeal. After the Supreme Court released its decision, Ford issued a statement:

I respect the decision of the Supreme Court of Canada and respect the judicial process. I’m so happy this is finally over. I’ve been vindicated and we can move on. This case has taken a significant toll on my family, both financially and emotionally. The entire case was driven by the political agenda of a very small group—a group who do not respect democracy. We all know these individuals have open ties to political activists. They tried to abuse a loophole in outdated laws—laws that even the premier admits need to be changed. They couldn’t beat me at the polls, so they tried everything they could to stop me from moving forward with my agenda. They’ve created months of instability, turmoil, and confusion at City Hall. Over what? Ask yourself: over what? Raising money to help underprivileged kids play football. I’m just glad this is finally over. Thank you very much.

== Issues arising from the trial ==
In Hackland's own decision, he described the penalty of removal as "a very blunt instrument and [it] has attracted justified criticism and calls for legislative reform." Hackland recommended "the existing sanctions in the Municipal Conflict of Interest Act (MCIA) remain in place. However, none should be mandatory, and lesser sanctions should be made available." Professor David Mullan, Toronto's former Integrity Commissioner, described it "it is simply Byzantine to have a regime under which the only way of dealing legally with conflict of interest in a municipal setting is by way of an elector making an application to a judge and where the principal and mandatory penalty (save in the case of inadvertence) is the sledgehammer of an order that the member’s office is vacated." He recommended "that the City should make every endeavour to persuade the provincial government to either modernize the Municipal Conflict of Interest Act or confer on the City of Toronto authority to create its own conflict of interest regime in place of or supplementary to that Act."

== See also ==
- Crazy Town: The Rob Ford Story, 2014 biography by Robyn Doolittle
- Timeline of Rob Ford video scandal
