= Ricky Tollman =

South African filmmaker

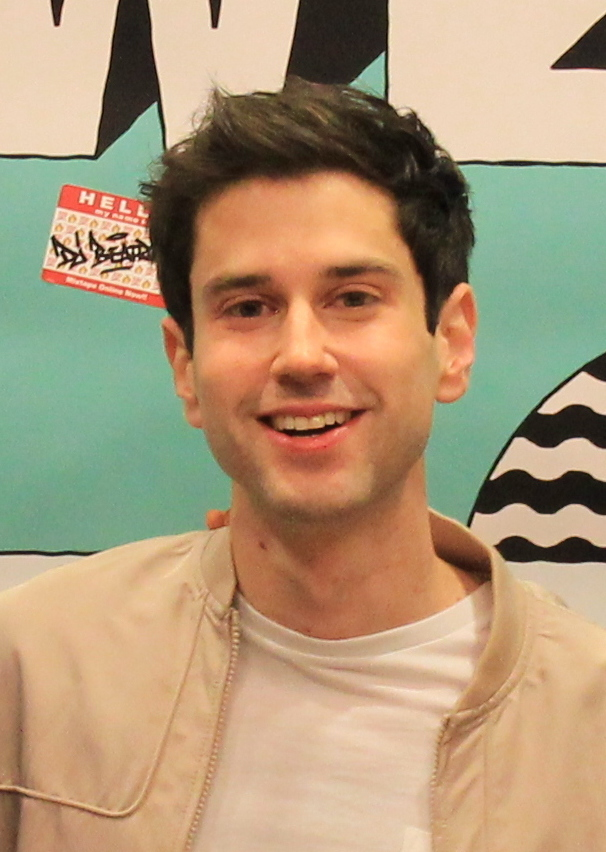
- at SXSW 2019
- Occupation: Filmmaker
- Years active: 2014–present

Ricky Tollman is a South African filmmaker, screenwriter, and producer.

== Early life ==
Tollman was born and grew up in Johannesburg, South Africa before immigrating with his family to Toronto, Canada.

== Career ==
In 2014, Tollman co-produced The Calling. The film grossed over $3 million in the United States on cable, satellite, and video on demand platforms and was #3 on the Top 10 Indie and Theatrical Films of 2014 on Xfinity, Comcast Cable's on demand service.

Tollman produced Jonathan, which had its world premiere at the Tribeca Film Festival in 2018.

Tollman wrote, directed and produced his feature debut film, Run This Town, which went into production in 2018 with Academy Award nominee J. C. Chandor executive producing. The film premiered at the South by Southwest film festival on March 9, 2019 in the Narrative Spotlight section. The film also played at the Traverse City Film Festival and FIN Atlantic Film Festival. It was acquired by Oscilloscope and released in conjunction with Twitter on March 6, 2020.

In the Los Angeles Times, Kenneth Turan called the Run This Town "the best kind of feature directing debut, a film that entertains and makes you look forward to what will come next," he continued "it’s as convincingly verbal as its characters, and that’s saying a lot". The Film Stage called the film "a superbly entertaining new thriller" and noted "the rapid-fire pacing is continually riveting, calling back to the great political thrillers of yesteryear," while John DeFore in The Hollywood Reporter called the film "an involving but stretched-thin journo procedural."

Run This Town received three Canadian Screen Award nominations at the 8th Canadian Screen Awards and a DGC Award nomination.
