= Mark Towhey =

Canadian broadcaster, author and political aide (born 1964)

- Born: 1964 (age 61–62); Kamloops, British Columbia
- Occupations: Broadcaster, columnist, political aide

Mark Towhey (born 1964) is a Canadian broadcaster, columnist, and former political aide.

From 2019 to 2020 he was editor-in-chief of Sun News, a group of five tabloid newspapers in Toronto, Ottawa, Winnipeg, Calgary and Edmonton owned by Postmedia Network. He left Postmedia management (and the Suns) in 2020 but remains a freelance columnist with the Toronto Sun.

He was previously a Canadian management consultant, and political strategist From 2013 until 2021, he hosted a 2-hour radio talk show, Sunday afternoons, on CFRB in Toronto.

He was a key player in the election of the late Rob Ford as mayor of Toronto, and Patrick Brown as leader of the Progressive Conservative Party of Ontario. He is the author of Mayor Rob Ford: Uncontrollable – How I tried to help the world’s most notorious mayor. He appeared as one of the key insiders narrating Trainwreck: Mayor of Mayhem, released on Netflix in June 2025.

Towhey remains a frequent contributor and political analyst and roundtable panelist on CFRB and has also appeared on CTV, CP24, TVO's The Agenda with Steve Paikin and in Huffington Post, the National Post, the Toronto Star and other media outlets.

== Personal life ==
Towhey was born in Kamloops, British Columbia. He briefly attended the University of Victoria until joining the Canadian Army as an officer, serving with the Princess Patricia’s Canadian Light Infantry for 13 years.

In October 2015, Skyhorse Publishing published Mayor Rob Ford: Uncontrollable co-written by Towhey and Globe and Mail journalist Johanna Schneller. The book was briefly a best seller in Canada.

Towhey has two sons and holds an MBA from the Richard Ivey School of Business at Western University and is a Certified Management Consultant.

Towhey became known for his sense of humor on Twitter when he tweeted "Finished May issue of Toronto Life, now plan to spend rest of night just hanging out, being evil" after reading a Toronto Life cover story that contained an unflattering portrait of him. Later, shortly after being fired on May 23, 2013 he retweeted a photo from a Toronto Sun photographer of him in his car leaving city hall, saying "Very happy now that I remembered to wash my car yesterday." His chocolate macaroon recipe was featured in the Toronto Star a few months later.

== Career ==
He left the military in 1996. He was a spokesperson for Canada Trust before starting his own crisis communication firm in 1998. His clients included the Canadian Imperial Bank of Commerce, McCain Foods, the Government of Canada, Ontario, and the United Nations. After returning to Canada from two years consulting in Afghanistan and Pakistan for the UN and World Bank Group, Towhey was hired by Toronto City Councillor Rob Ford to help on his mayoral campaign.

When Ford was elected in October 2010, Towhey was appointed his Director of Strategy & Policy, a role in which he was widely referred to by city councillors as the mayor’s "Rasputin." In August 2012, he was promoted to Chief of Staff until he was fired by Ford on May 23, 2013 for reportedly telling Ford to go to rehab for his drug addiction. When CFRB cancelled Ford’s Sunday afternoon radio program in November 2013, they hired Towhey as his permanent replacement in that time slot.

When Postmedia appointed Towhey as Editor-in-Chief of Sun News, Canadaland questioned his appointed due to his lack of journalism experience. Mark Bonokoski, a veteran Sun writer, noted that Towhey complained his criticism of Conservative leader Andrew Scheer was "boring" and encouraged the columnist to do better. He left the position in 2020, after almost a year, but continued as a columnist for the chain.
