= Dixon Bloods =

Street gang founded in Toronto, Ontario, Canada

- Founded: 2006
- Founding location: Toronto, Ontario, Canada
- Years active: 2006–present
- Territory: Toronto and Windsor, Ontario, Canada
- Ethnicity: Somali Canadians; Afghan Canadians; African Canadians; Hungarian Canadians
- Membership (est.): approx. 600–800
- Criminal activities: Drug trafficking, weapon trafficking, robberies, extortion, organized crime, murder, theft.

The Dixon Bloods or the Dixon City Bloods, also known as the Dixon Goonies, is a street gang based in Toronto, Ontario, Canada.

== Overview ==
According to Toronto police, the Dixon Bloods had been responsible for weapons trafficking and drug trafficking out of a highrise apartment complex in Toronto's Kingsview Village neighborhood, located on Dixon Road east of Kipling Avenue. Unconfirmed rumours state that one of the founding members of the gang was a former member of a New York-based gang known as G-Shine Bloods, who had relocated to the neighborhood in the early 2000s. Officers allege that they effectively dismantled the gang operation in 2013, following the year-long Project Traveller investigation. Although the probe was launched shortly after the Rob Ford crack scandal broke, one of the detectives involved in Project Traveller indicated that the investigation was unrelated to it and that the probe was instead intended to quash a local criminal organization. Forty-three alleged members were arrested and charged during the ensuing police raid. Forty guns were also impounded, in addition to illegal substances and bundles of cash. Eleven of the 39 search warrants that had been made were in Windsor. The officers had been acting on tips they had received on the group's activities.

Toronto police alleged that at its height, the gang operated through associates as far west as Edmonton. Officers with Edmonton's organized crime branch confirmed that they had encountered Dixon Blood associates from Toronto, but there was no evidence that the gang was operating as a criminal organization in the Edmonton area.

The Toronto police concurrently announced that with the conclusion of Project Traveller, Project Clean Slate would be launched in its place to ensure that the criminal void left by the arrests is not filled and to strengthen relations with the area's residents.
