= Rob Ford =

Canadian politician (1969–2016)

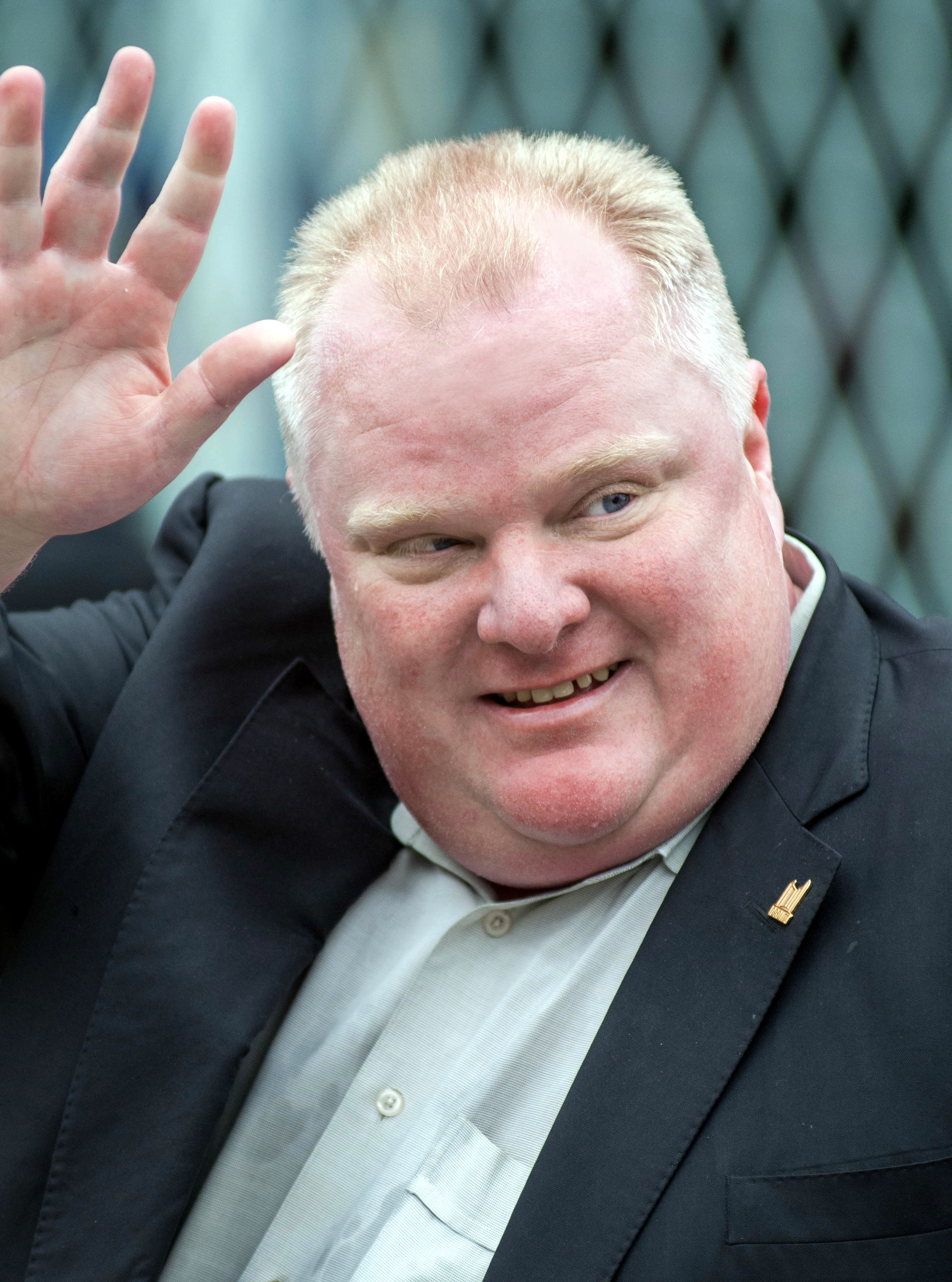
- Ford in 2013

64th Mayor of Toronto
- In office December 1, 2010 – December 1, 2014
- Deputy: Doug Holyday (2010–2013); Norm Kelly (2013–2014)
- Preceded by: David Miller
- Succeeded by: John Tory

Toronto City Councillor for Ward 2 Etobicoke North
- In office December 1, 2014 – March 22, 2016
- Preceded by: Doug Ford
- Succeeded by: Michael Ford
- In office November 14, 2000 – December 1, 2010
- Preceded by: Ward established
- Succeeded by: Doug Ford

Personal details
- Born: Robert Bruce Ford; May 28, 1969 Etobicoke, Ontario, Canada
- Died: March 22, 2016 (aged 46) Toronto, Ontario, Canada
- Resting place: Riverside Cemetery
- Party: Independent (2000–2016) (Note: Municipal politicians in Ontario, including Toronto, run on a nonpartisan basis.)
- Other political affiliations: Progressive Conservative
- Spouse: Renata Brejniak (m. 2000)
- Relations: Doug Ford Sr. (father); Doug Ford Jr. (brother); Michael Ford (nephew); Krista Haynes (niece)
- Children: 2
- Education: Carleton University (no degree)

Robert Bruce Ford (May 28, 1969 – March 22, 2016) was a Canadian politician and businessman who served as the 64th mayor of Toronto from 2010 to 2014. Before and after his term as mayor, Ford was a city councillor; first being elected to Toronto City Council in the 2000 municipal election, before being re-elected to his council seat twice.

Ford's political career, particularly his mayoralty, saw a number of personal and work-related controversies and legal proceedings. In 2013, he became embroiled in a substance abuse scandal, which was widely reported in national and foreign press. Following his admission, Ford refused to resign, but the city council voted to hand over certain mayoral powers and office staff to Deputy Mayor Norm Kelly for the remainder of Ford's term.

Ford took a sabbatical and received treatment for his alcohol and drug addiction. Despite the scandal, Ford initially contested the next mayoral election, scheduled for October 2014, but after being hospitalized and diagnosed with an abdominal tumour in September 2014, Ford withdrew from the mayoral race and registered instead to run for his old city council seat. John Tory succeeded him as mayor on December 1, 2014, while Ford regained his former seat. Ford received treatment for the cancer, and was able to return briefly to council, but died in March 2016 after chemotherapy was ineffective.

== Early life ==
Ford was born in Etobicoke, Ontario, in 1969, the youngest of the four children (Doug, Kathy, Randy, and Rob) of Douglas Bruce Ford and Ruth Diane (née Campbell). His paternal grandparents were English immigrants. His father, along with Ted Herriott, was co-founder of Deco Labels and Tags, which makes pressure-sensitive labels for plastic-wrapped grocery products at an estimated CA$100 million in annual sales, and was a Progressive Conservative member of the Provincial Parliament from 1995 to 1999.

Ford attended Scarlett Heights Collegiate Institute in Etobicoke. He dreamed of becoming a professional football player, and his father paid for him to attend special camps of the University of Notre Dame and of NFL's Washington Redskins. After graduating from high school, Ford went to Carleton University in Ottawa to study political science. He made the football team, but did not play in any games. He left Carleton after one year to return to Toronto and did not complete his degree. After Carleton, he started a sales job at Deco. After Doug Ford Sr.'s death in 2006, the Ford family retained ownership of Deco Labels through the Doug Ford Holdings corporation. Ford, alongside his brothers and their mother was a director of the company.

In August 2000, Ford married Renata Brejniak, whom he had met in high school, at All Saints Roman Catholic Church in Etobicoke. They had been dating since Brejniak's divorce from her first husband in February 1996. Ford lived with Renata and their two children, Stephanie and Doug, in Etobicoke until his death in 2016. Stephanie would be elected to the executive committee of the Progressive Conservative Party of Ontario in 2026.

== Political career ==
=== City councillor ===
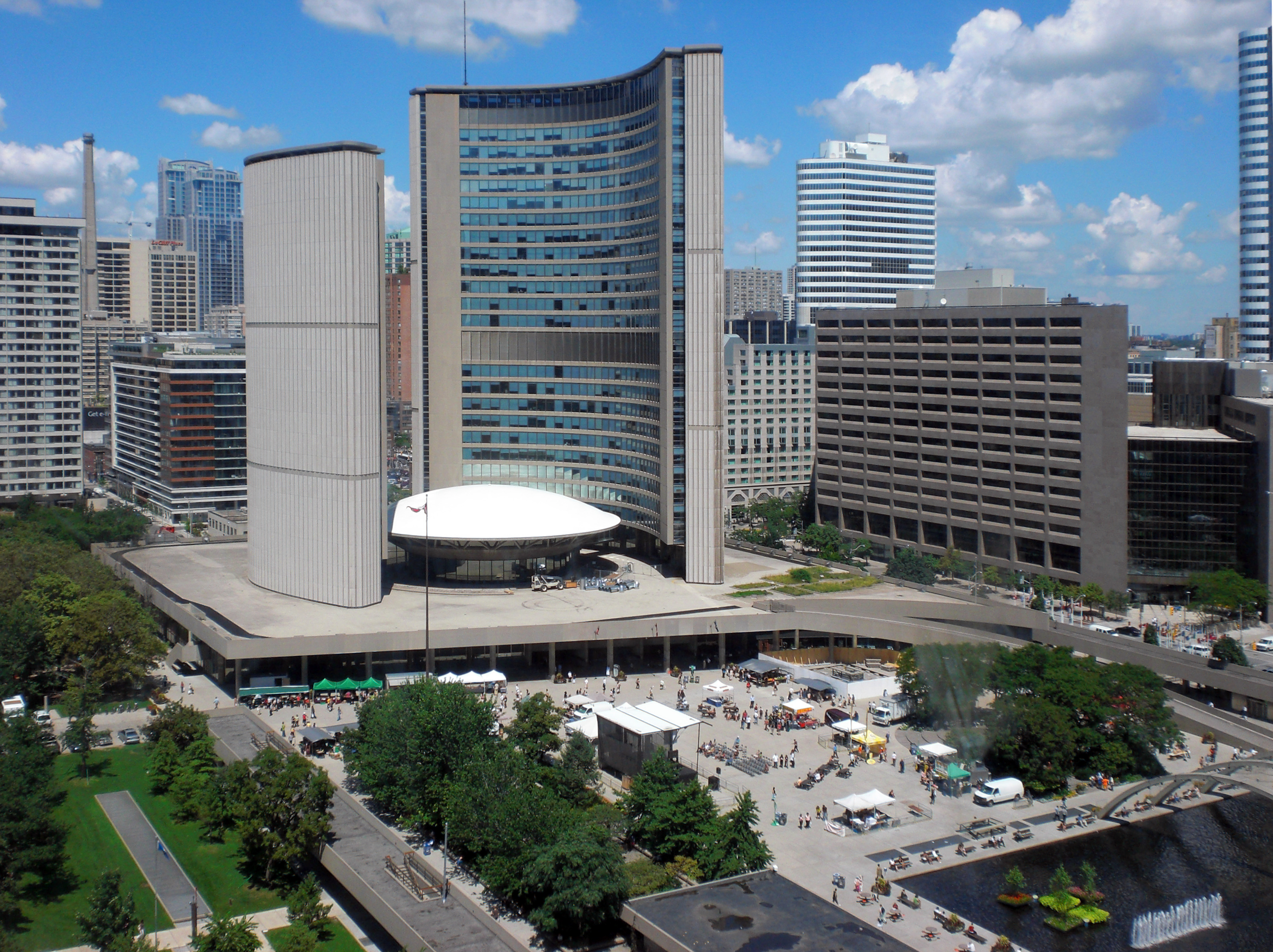
Ford served as a city councillor on Toronto City Council from 2000 to 2010.

Ford served three terms as city councillor from 2000 until October 2010, representing Ward 2 Etobicoke North. During his term as councillor, Ford was a strong critic of councillors' spending. Ford was known for his controversial comments and passionate arguments at council.

Ford first ran for Toronto City Council in 1997, placing fourth to Gloria Lindsay Luby in Ward 3 Kingsway-Humber. Ford ran for councillor in Ward 2 Etobicoke North in the following election in 2000, getting the endorsement of the Toronto Star. Ford defeated incumbent Elizabeth Brown in what was considered one of several upsets in Etobicoke. According to Ford, "the people said they wanted change and they got change".

Ward 2 is located in the north-west corner of the city in the former city of Etobicoke. The ward's population of over 50,000 in 2006 was 53% composed of immigrants, the largest group being South Asians. It is mixed in nature with 40% of dwellings being single-family detached homes and 35% being high-rise apartments. It is also known as an area that has seen gang violence, including six murders in 2000.

Ford had previously resided in the ward, but moved in 2000 prior to the election, after his marriage, to Ward 4. In 2003, Ford was re-elected with 80% of the vote in Ward 2, defeating two candidates from the local Somali community. In the 2006 election, Ford won again, defeating Somali-Canadian candidate Cadigia Ali, this time with 66% of the vote.

==== 2001 municipal budget ====
It was during the 2001 budget deliberations that Ford earned a reputation for passionate speeches. The City of Toronto was facing a several hundred million dollar budget shortfall, enough to require a 32% tax increase after the Government of Ontario shifted the delivery of services from itself to Toronto, who would have to then pay for them. Toronto Mayor Mel Lastman was pleading with other governments for financial assistance. According to Don Wanagas, the National Post City Hall columnist, the other councillors began to dread when Ford rose to speak. "I have to give my head a shake because some of the rhetoric that comes out of the mouths of some of these councillors boggles my mind, I swear. ... Get the government out of our backyards. It's ridiculous. Government red tape here. Bureaucratic here. It's nonsense having all this government. And it's nonsense. It's so ridiculous. If you don't like what the province is doing, there's going to be an election in June of '03 – before our election, by the way." Councillor Anne Johnston proposed giving Ford a "neo-con award of the day", while Councillor Joe Pantalone advised Ford to take Prozac. Ford argued against spending money on the suicide prevention barrier on the Prince Edward Viaduct, and spending it instead on rounding up child molesters "who are the main cause of people jumping off bridges".

Ford proposed a cut to each councillor's $200,000 office budget, money for travel to conferences, ending city limousine usage and club memberships. According to Ford, "if we wiped out the perks for council members, we'd save $100 million easy." Ford was one of only four councillors who voted against a 5% increase in property taxes for 2001. Ford made a point of not using his allotted city budget for his office expenses, paying for the expenses from his salary. He claimed $10 for his first year, and $4 for his second year. In Ford's opinion, "all this office budget stuff is self-promotion to benefit yourself. Why should the taxpayers have to pay for it? It boggles my mind."

==== 2002 municipal budget ====
During the debates around the 2002 municipal budget, Ford and Councillor Giorgio Mammoliti got in several heated exchanges, where Mammolitti called Ford a "goon" and Ford called Mammolitti a "scammer". The argument got heated to the point where Ford called Mammolitti a "Gino-boy". Mammolitti called the insult a "racist remark" and filed a complaint with the city's human-rights office. Three councillors stated that they heard the insult said by Ford, who denied it. Ford dismissed the councillors stating that they were liars if they thought he had made a racist remark. "I'm a conservative and the majority of people are left-wing and cannot stand my politics." The exchanges led Councillor Pam McConnell to complain about "testosterone poisoning" in the chamber. Ford extended his exchanges outside the chamber with columnist John Barber of The Globe and Mail: "I am not a racist. Anyone who calls me a racist is going to face the consequences!", to which Barber replied "You are a racist." Despite this dispute, Mammolitti and Ford later became close allies on council.

==== 2003 municipal election ====
In the 2003 municipal election, Ford endorsed twelve political candidates on a platform of fiscal responsibility to take on fellow councillors: "We just need to get rid of these lifelong politicians that just give out money to special interest groups and don't serve the community. I'm really teed off. We need to get a new council or this city is going to go down the drain." Ford targeted Brian Ashton, Maria Augimeri, Sandra Bussin, Olivia Chow, Pam McConnell, Howard Moscoe and Sherene Shaw. Shaw was defeated by Ford's future budget chief Michael Del Grande, while the rest were re-elected.

Ford made a priority of responding to local constituents' problems, often returning calls himself or meeting with city staff to resolve problems. In 2005, local radio station AM 640 tested councillors on their response by having a reporter make an after-hours call to report a pothole. Ford was one of only three councillors to call back in person, within a day. His zeal in attending to constituents' problems became a competitive rivalry with fellow councillors Howard Moscoe and Gloria Lindsay Luby.

In June 2006, Ford spoke out against the city donating CA$1.5 million to help prevent AIDS, arguing that most taxpayers should not be concerned with AIDS. Ford publicly apologized for the comments in May 2010 during his mayoral campaign after his opponent, George Smitherman, called Ford's character into question over the remarks. At a council meeting on March 5, 2008, Ford stated "Those Oriental people work like dogs", a remark he later formally apologized for while stating that he meant it as a compliment.

On March 7, 2007, Ford spoke out against cyclists sharing roads with motorists, which were "built for buses, cars, and trucks, not for people on bikes". As councillor, Ford opposed the installation of bike lanes on University Avenue and Jarvis Street and during his election campaign, proposed spending money on off-road cycle paths. Bike lanes were installed on Jarvis in 2010 over the objection of traffic advocates, and Ford made it a priority to get them removed during his campaign. As mayor, he was able to get council to reverse the decision in 2011, a move which was criticized by cycling advocates and led to protests. The Jarvis bike lanes, which cost the city $86,000 to install in 2011, were removed in December 2012 at a cost of $200,000–$300,000. At the same time, physically separated bike lanes on Sherbourne Street were installed. Toronto Cyclist Union president Andrea Garcia praised the Sherbourne lanes installation: "Cities all across North America that are doing way more innovative things for cyclists have been building separated bike lanes for a long time ... It's great to finally see Toronto catch up." However, she also regretted the loss of lanes on Jarvis: "People live and work and go to school on both of these streets and they all need a safe way to get to these places."

=== 2010 Toronto mayoral election ===
Ford was elected mayor with 383,501 votes (47%) over George Smitherman's 289,832 (35.6%) and Joe Pantalone with 95,482 (11.7%). The voter turnout was around 52% of registered voters, the highest in Toronto's post-amalgamation history. Ward-by-ward electoral results showed that Ford had won all of the former pre-amalgamation suburbs, while Smitherman topped districts in the pre-amalgamation Toronto districts. Ford received 80,000 votes from the "Downtown 13" wards, or 20% of his total votes. Ford ran on a populist platform of fiscal conservatism and subway expansion. During the campaign, the scandals benefited Ford. After his driving under the influence (DUI) conviction became public, his share of the vote increased 10%. After it was revealed he was banned from high school coaching, he raised CA$25,000 in campaign contributions overnight.

=== Mayor ===
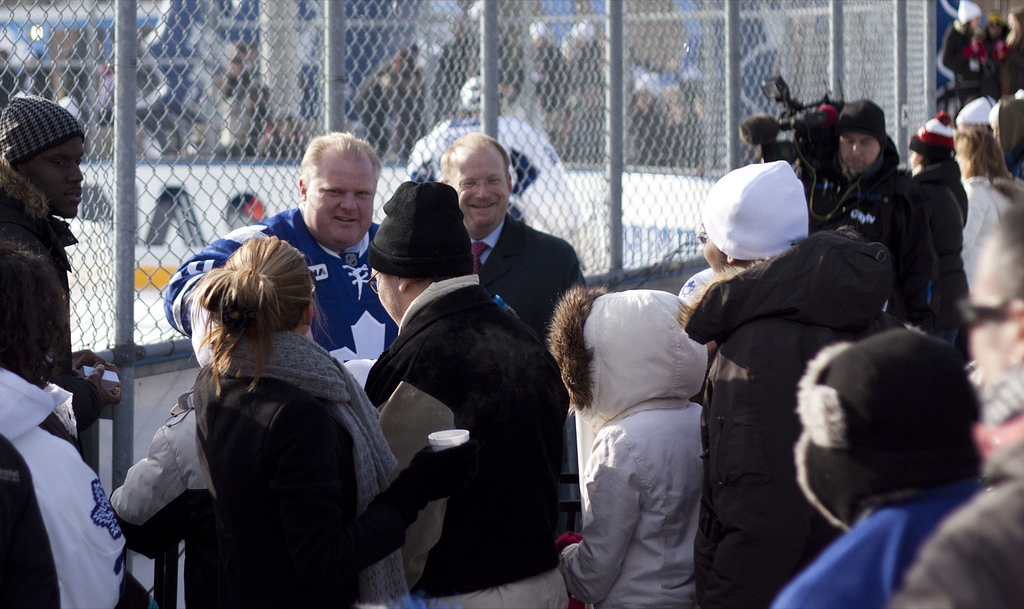
Ford at a Toronto Maple Leafs practice in Trinity Bellwoods Park, 2010.

After his victory in the 2010 election, Ford had outgoing councillor Case Ootes, a former City of Toronto budget chief, head the "transition team". From his campaign team, Ford named Nick Kouvalis as his chief of staff; Mark Towhey, who had drafted his campaign platform, as his policy advisor; and Adrienne Batra, his communications advisor, as press secretary. Councillor Doug Holyday, who had helped elect Doug Ford Sr., was named deputy mayor. For the executive committee of City Council, Ford named councillors who had endorsed him in his campaign. For the inauguration ceremony at the first meeting of the new council, Ford had television commentator Don Cherry introduce him and put the chain of office on him. Cherry garnered some controversy with his remarks. Cherry described how Ford had reversed a mistake of city staff cutting down a tree of a Toronto property owner for no good reason and then billing the property owner, who suffered from Alzheimer's. Cherry added "Put that in your pipe you left-wing kooks" and, in regards to the pink suit he was wearing, "I'm wearing pinko for all the pinkos out there that ride bicycles and everything, I thought I'd get it in." At its first meeting in December 2010, the council voted to cancel the annual $60 personal vehicle registration tax passed by the previous council. The tax cancellation, a campaign promise of Ford's, took effect on January 1, 2011.

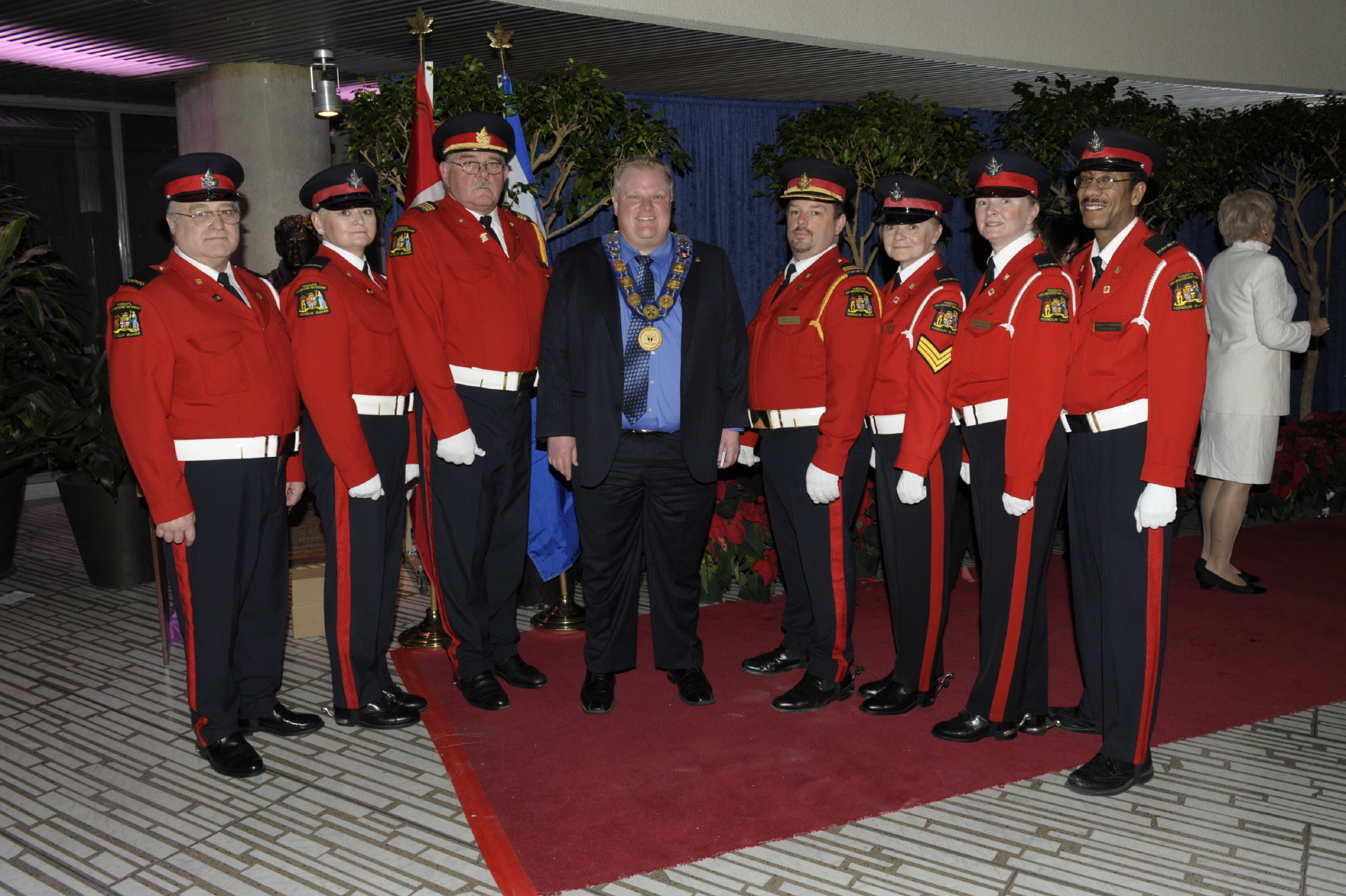
Ford at the annual Mayor's New Year's Levee at Toronto City Hall.

During the first year in office, the council mostly endorsed Ford's proposals. Ford privatized garbage pickup west of Yonge Street. Previously, only Etobicoke had privatized waste removal. Ford's first year as mayor in 2011 saw no property tax increase, and subsequent years' increases were less than the rate of inflation. Under Ford, council voted to declare the TTC an essential service. Ford reduced, but was unable to completely remove, the Miller-era land transfer tax. During the summer of 2013, City Council endorsed Ford's plan to cancel the "Transit City" transit plan and build the Scarborough subway extension fulfilling one of Ford's main campaign promises. This project was later approved and received funding both provincially and federally. In later years, Council would reject Ford's transit plans, including not putting the Crosstown LRT underground for its entire route. Near the end of Ford's term, Ford's powers were reduced by Council, spurred by Ford's personal problems, most notably reports of a video showing Ford smoking crack cocaine. According to one source, the effective removal of Ford from the mayor's seat opened Toronto politics and significant advances were achieved for a people's agenda.

Rob Ford's brother Doug Ford was the Toronto city councillor for Ward 2 Etobicoke North in Toronto from 2010 to 2014, during Rob's term as mayor.

=== 2014 election ===
Ford registered on January 2, 2014, as a candidate in the fall's mayoral election. He participated in several debates but went on a leave of absence in May and June to deal with his substance abuse issues after a video surfaced of him smoking crack cocaine. Ford returned from his leave of absence in July and was polling in second place, behind John Tory and ahead of Olivia Chow. On September 12, 2014, Ford suddenly withdrew his candidacy due to the discovery of a tumour in his abdomen which was suspected to be, and subsequently confirmed to be cancerous. His brother Doug registered as a mayoral candidate in Ford's place and Ford instead registered as a candidate for city councillor in his old constituency of Ward 2 Etobicoke North. Doug Ford, with 33% of the vote, was defeated in the October 27 mayoral election by Tory, who received 40%, while Rob Ford was successful in Ward 2, being elected with 58% of the vote. Ford's term as mayor ended on November 30, 2014.

He stated that he intended to run for mayor again in 2018. But as it turned out, he would die in 2016.

== Personal life ==
=== Football coaching ===
Ford volunteered his time to coach high school football. Ford first coached at Newtonbrook Secondary School in 2001, until he was dismissed over a dispute with a player. He coached at Don Bosco Catholic Secondary School from 2001 until 2013 when the Toronto Catholic District School Board dismissed him after a controversial television interview led to a review of his coaching. Ford had donated $20,000 to equip the Don Bosco team and started a foundation, called the Rob Ford Football Foundation, to fund teams at other underprivileged schools struggling to field football teams.

=== Domestic disturbances ===
In 2008, after a 9-1-1 call from the Ford home, he was charged with assault and threatening to kill his wife. The Crown attorney said "there was no reasonable prospect of conviction" because there were "credibility issues" with allegations by Ford's wife due to inconsistencies in her statements. Ford said at the time that he was glad the ordeal was over and that he and his wife had sought marital counselling.

In two separate incidents, on October 25, 2011, and again on December 25, 2011, police were called to Ford's home to investigate domestic disputes. During the Christmas Day incident, his mother-in-law called 9-1-1 between 4:00 – 5:00 a.m. local time as she was concerned that Ford had been drinking and was going to take his children to Florida against his wife's wishes. No charges were filed for either incident. Further domestic incident calls to police occurred in 2012 and on August 27, 2013. Again, no charges were filed.

=== Alcohol and drug addiction ===
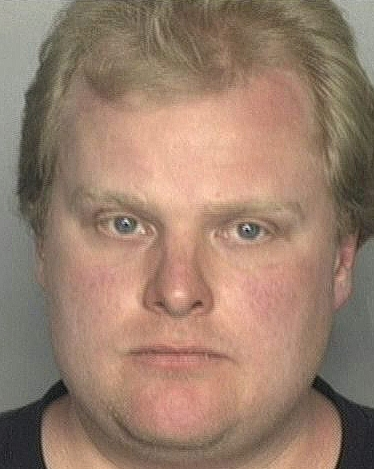
Mugshot in Miami, Florida (1999)

Ford suffered from alcohol and drug addiction for many years. After the death of his father in 2006, Ford's abuse grew and led to public episodes of intoxication, followed by public denials. His episodes, which were symptomatic of alcohol and drug addiction, were reported in the media widely, and attracted much condemnation. Ford's abuse led to him being stripped of much of his powers as Toronto mayor, and he later entered drug rehabilitation.

On April 15, 2006, Ford attended a Toronto Maple Leafs hockey game at the Air Canada Centre. According to a couple nearby, Ford was intoxicated, using profanity, and insulting spectators. The couple then sent a detailed complaint to the City of Toronto. When confronted about the episode three days later by a National Post reporter, Ford initially denied having been at the game, but later admitted it. "I'm going through a few personal problems, but it doesn't justify, you know, getting drunk in public and pretty well acting like an idiot if you ask me."

The death of Rob Ford's father, Doug Ford Sr., in September 2006 due to cancer has been pinpointed as the time period when Ford transitioned to crack cocaine in addition to alcohol. A convicted heroin dealer who used to supply Ford's sister Kathy recalled a party with Ford around that time. According to reporter Robyn Doolittle, Ford would come home at night and either drink heavily or use hard drugs or prescription pills.

During Ford's 2010 mayoral campaign, a 1999 arrest in Miami, Florida for DUI and marijuana possession became an election issue for him when the Toronto Star published details of his arrest. Ford pleaded no contest to the DUI charge, while the marijuana charge was withdrawn. Ford was given a fine. When first confronted, Ford denied it. When presented with the arrest paperwork, Ford apologized and claimed he had forgotten about it. He then announced at a press conference that he had been charged with failing to provide a breath sample, when he had been arrested and convicted of drunk driving.

At Saint Patrick's Day festivities in March 2012, Ford was "very intoxicated" at City Hall and a downtown restaurant. According to those attending, he held a "wild party" in his office. Ford knocked down a staffer, insulted others, then went to a restaurant. According to one server, Ford did cocaine in a private room at the restaurant. After "flailing around" on the restaurant's dance floor, he returned to City Hall by cab, making racial slurs to the driver. Ford then wandered around City Hall after 2:00 a.m. with a bottle of brandy, using profane language at his staffer, Earl Provost, before security arranged for him to be taken home. The incident was revealed in November 2013, after an e-mail from a City Hall security guard describing the incident was found through access to information requests.

Ford's staff tried to convince Ford to get treatment for his alcoholism, but he initially refused. Ford was reported smoking marijuana in a shopping plaza parking lot. In February 2013, Ford attended the Garrison Ball and was reported to be incoherent. His staff ushered him out after an event organizer asked him to leave. In March 2013, Ford was accused of groping former mayoral candidate Sarah Thomson at a social event, and Thomson publicly stated that she thought that he was high on cocaine. It was around that time that Ford was recorded on video smoking crack cocaine, a video which the dealers attempted to sell to the Toronto Star and other media outlets.

In November 2013, on live television, Ford denied that he had made lewd remarks to a female aide, wherein he allegedly said he wanted to give her oral sex. In his denial, he said, "I'm happily married. I've got more than enough to eat at home." He later apologized for his graphic remarks.

In April 2014, Ford was involved in another incident at the Air Canada Centre. Ford, along with city budget chief Frank DiGiorgio, was denied access to the Director's Lounge at the Air Canada Centre. He was video-recorded issuing profanities during an argument with the security staff. He later denied being intoxicated, and blamed the incident on voting against a $10 million contribution to MLSE's plan to expand BMO Field. DiGiorgio described Ford as "somewhere between sober and drunk".

On August 11, 2016, four months after his death, the original video of Ford smoking crack cocaine was released from publication ban by the Toronto Police Service after the extortion charge against Sandro Lisi was dropped. The cellphone video was recorded "surreptitiously" by Mohamed Siad in February 2013. The video shows Ford smoking crack cocaine from a glass pipe. His words are slurred and mostly inaudible during the conversation. Shortly before he admitted smoking crack cocaine, Ford said, "Whatever this video shows ... Toronto residents deserve to see it and people need to judge for themselves what they see on this video."

== Illness and death ==
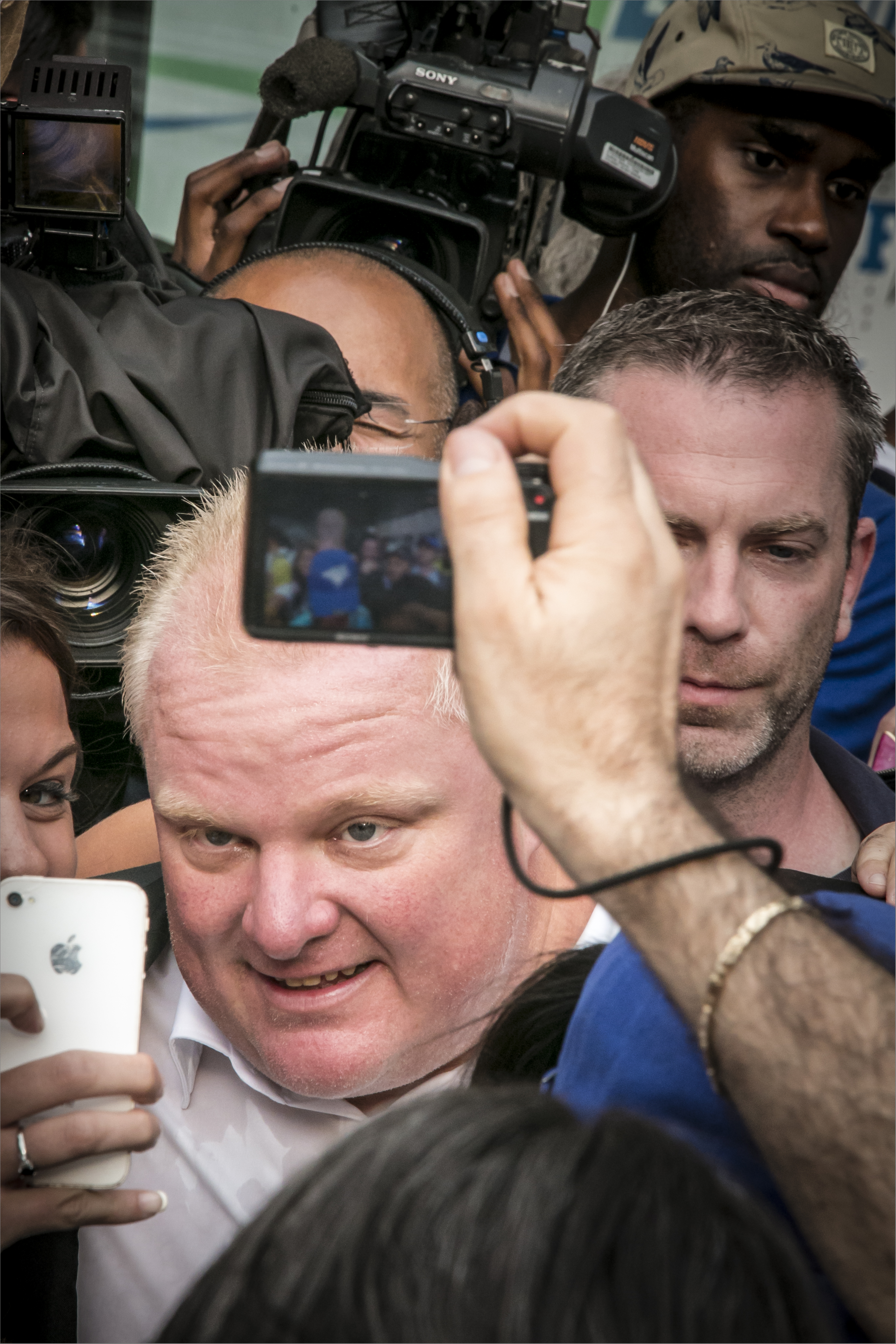
Ford campaigning in July 2014, shortly before withdrawing his candidacy

After developing severe abdominal pains, Ford was admitted to Humber River Regional Hospital in North York in September 2014 with an abdominal tumour, and a biopsy was taken. Ford announced that he would not run in the 2014 Toronto mayoral election because of his illness; his brother Doug would run in his place. Ford chose to run for his former Ward 2 seat on the City Council. He was likely to shortly begin treatment with multiple chemotherapy agents; the doctor did not say whether Ford would need to have surgery or radiation treatments.

On September 17, 2014, Zane Cohen of Mount Sinai Hospital (the lead doctor of Ford's health care team) revealed that Ford had been diagnosed with pleomorphic liposarcoma, a rare form of cancer that arises in adipose tissue, or body fat. Ford was treated with chemotherapy and surgery. After chemotherapy and radiation therapy, Ford announced in a press conference that he was going to have a lengthy surgery done on May 11, 2015, to remove the tumour. He said he would be "out of commission" for four months. At a community barbecue hosted by the Ford family in 2015, Rob announced that doctors had cleared him of cancerous tumours.

On October 28, 2015, Ford revealed, and his physician confirmed, that a new tumour was growing on his bladder. The next day, Doug Ford advised reporters that the tumour had been found to be cancerous and consistent with liposarcoma (the previous tumour), based on a CT scan.

On March 17, 2016, Ford's office announced he was in the hospital "with his family beside him" as chemotherapy treatment had not been successful, and Ford's health was being reviewed to determine if he could continue treatment. The Ford family thanked the many who had wished the former mayor well in recent weeks, but requested privacy. A Rob Ford "get-well-soon" website was set up by the Ford family to send positive messages to Ford while he received cancer treatment; it received over 5,000 messages from well-wishers in the first two weeks after its creation.

On March 21, Ford's office confirmed that he had been placed into palliative care at Mount Sinai Hospital. Ford died the next day at the age of 46. Following his death, City Hall initiated an official period of mourning. Flags at municipal buildings were lowered to half-mast and a book of condolences was opened at City Hall. In Nathan Phillips Square, chalk was provided for the public to write messages on the pavement, mirroring the communal expression of grief after the death of Jack Layton, and the 3D Toronto sign was dimmed. Visitations were held at City Hall for two days, attended by the Ford family. On March 30, a public funeral service was held at St. James Cathedral, followed by a commemoration of Ford's life at the Toronto Congress Centre. Ford was interred at Riverside Cemetery in Etobicoke, the same resting place as his father.

Rob Ford's brothers Doug and Randy took on stewardship of Rob's share of Deco Labels and Tags upon his death. Renata survived her husband until her own death at age 55 in 2026.

== Legacy ==
Originally started as a community barbecue in Ford's home backyard in Etobicoke, "Ford Fest" has since expanded as a political rally and event hosted by the Ford family. Following his passing, his brother Doug Ford and the Progressive Conservative Party of Ontario host yearly "Ford Fest" events in and outside of Etobicoke.

Supported by the Ward 3 incumbent, Stephen Holyday, and the Ford family, in September 2017, then Toronto Mayor John Tory proposed renaming Centennial Park Stadium after Ford. The city council rejected the proposed renaming on October 4, 2017. In 2023, Councillor Paul Ainslie put forward another motion to change the name to "Rob Ford Stadium". This motion passed 17–6, including with the support of Toronto Mayor Olivia Chow.

Ford's drug scandal was dramatized in the 2019 film Run This Town. Additionally, the 2025 documentary film Trainwreck: Mayor of Mayhem is about him and his drug scandal.

== See also ==
- Ford family (Canada)
- Crazy Town: The Rob Ford Story, 2014 biography by Robyn Doolittle
- Rob Ford conflict of interest trial
- Timeline of Rob Ford video scandal
