= Mayor of Toronto =

Political office

- Municipal logo

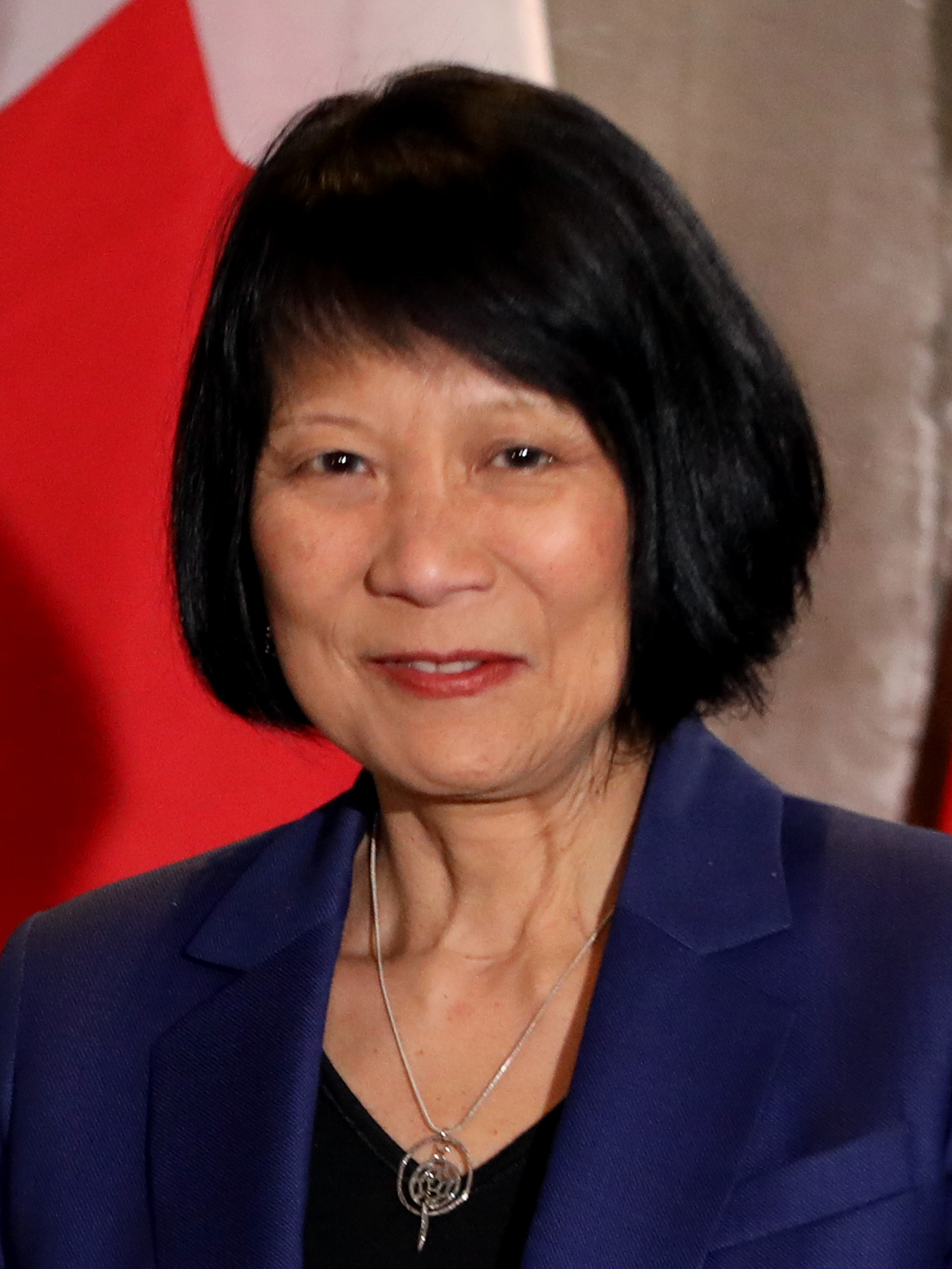
- Incumbent; Olivia Chow since July 12, 2023
- City of Toronto; Office of the Mayor
- Style: His/Her Worship; Mayor (informal)
- Member of: Toronto City Council
- Seat: Toronto City Hall
- Appointer: Direct election
- Term length: 4 years; renewable
- Constituting instrument: City of Toronto Act
- Inaugural holder: William Lyon Mackenzie (historic); Mel Lastman (post-amalgamation)
- Formation: March 6, 1834 (historic); December 1, 1998 (current)
- Deputy: Deputy Mayor
- Salary: CA$202,948.20
- Website: www.toronto.ca/mayor

The mayor of Toronto is the head of Toronto City Council and chief executive officer of the municipal government. The mayor is elected alongside city council every four years on the fourth Monday of October; there are no term limits. While in office, mayors are styled His/Her Worship.

Olivia Chow has served as the 66th and current mayor of Toronto since July 12, 2023, after winning the 2023 by-election.

== Role and authority ==
The role and powers of the mayor of Toronto are set out in the 1997 City of Toronto Act, an Ontario statute, and its update in 2006. It outlines the mayor's role as head of council and chief executive officer of the City of Toronto. In September 2022, the province passed legislation known as the Strong Mayors, Building More Homes Act, 2022, followed by the Better Municipal Governance Act, 2022, both of which expanded the executive power of the mayor.

As head of council, the mayor is responsible for ensuring business is carried out efficiently during council meetings. This has been delegated to the speaker of Toronto City Council, however, the mayor retains the ability to take over as chair during council meetings. Items can be added by the mayor directly to city council's agenda without going through a committee. Additionally, the mayor also holds ex officio membership on all council committees, chairs the Executive Committee, Striking Committee and the Civic Appointments Committee. The mayor has the power to appoint the chairs of other city committees as well as the deputy mayor. With the consent of the mayor, another member of council may take the mayor's place on committees. The head of council is also responsible for declaring states of emergency in the city.

Before the passage of the Strong Mayors Act, Toronto's government operated on what has been described as a "weak-mayor" system where all powers were vested in Council as a whole. In order to advance policy objectives, the mayor had to act as a consensus builder. The Strong Mayors Act shifted Toronto's government structure into one which resembles a "strong-mayor" system, assigning several administrative powers to the mayor which were previously held by City Council or an officer of the city.

The Strong Mayors Act expands the mayor's role in managing City Council's committee system and the overall organization of the city. Much of the work of the council is done in committees. The mayor sets out this structure by creating and dissolving committees, appoints their chairs and vice-chairs (this is a power that was delegated by council before 2022), and assigning their functions. Without the need for a motion by council, city staff can also be directed by the mayor to produce reports, develop policy and provide advice for city council to consider.

The mayor is also responsible for determining the organizational structure of the city. This includes the ability to create or dissolve city divisions, and appoint or terminate executive staff such as the city manager (who is the chief administrative officer) and the heads of city divisions. (Note: The mayor's power to hire and dismiss city staff do not apply to certain officials including: the city clerk or deputy clerk, the treasurer or deputy treasurer, the integrity commissioner, the ombudsman, the auditor general, the chief building official, the chief of police, the fire chief, and the medical officer of health.)

Developing the annual budget of the City of Toronto is another key function of the mayor. Previously, the power to set the budget was a function of city council, which was assigned to the Budget Committee, allowing the mayor to exercise significant influence on the budget process. The power to draft the annual city budget is now assigned to the mayor. The mayor proposes the budget to council, which can adopt it or propose amendments.

Certain powers of the mayor can only be exercised in order to "advance provincial priorities", as outlined in the Better Municipal Governance Act, the Strong Mayors Act and through regulation. While city by-law allows the mayor to add items directly to council's agenda, this power is expanded by the Strong Mayors Act, which asserts that the mayor can do so to advance a provincial priority, irrespective of council's procedural by-law. The mayor is also granted a veto, which would allow an override of a city council decision if it is not consistent with a provincial priority, however, council can override the mayor's veto with a two-thirds majority vote. The Better Municipal Governance Act, which was passed shortly after the Strong Mayors Act further expands this power, allowing the mayor to pass a by-law for the purpose of advancing a provincial priority with one-third support on council. The provincial priorities are set by the Executive Council of Ontario (provincial cabinet), through issuing regulations.

== Deputy mayor ==
City councillors may be appointed by the mayor to exercise statutory powers assigned to the mayor, or on an honorary basis.

Portrait	Deputy mayor	Term began	Area represented/policy role	Constituency as councillor
	Ausma Malik	August 10, 2023	Statutory deputy mayor; Toronto and East York	Ward 10 Spadina—Fort York
	Paul Ainslie	May 21, 2025	Non-statutory; Scarborough	Ward 24 Scarborough—Guildwood
	Michael Colle	August 10, 2023	Non-statutory; North York	Ward 8 Eglinton—Lawrence
	Amber Morley	August 10, 2023	Non-statutory; Etobicoke	Ward 3 Etobicoke—Lakeshore

=== Statutory deputy mayor ===
The first deputy mayor performs the statutory roles and functions assigned to the "deputy mayor" as defined in various chapters of the municipal code. The first deputy mayor is a member of council who is appointed to the role by the mayor, and assists them as vice-chair of the executive committee and acts as mayor when the mayor is away, ill or the office of the mayor is vacant. The deputy mayor has all the rights, power and authority of the mayor, save and except the "by-right-of-office powers" of the mayor as a member of a community council.

==== Role of mayor vacancy ====
When the office of Mayor of Toronto is vacant, the deputy mayor assumes limited mayoral powers which are granted to the mayor by city council, to ensure city business can continue to be carried out. This includes acting as the city's chief executive officer, representing the city, and special privileges during council sessions. The deputy mayor also assumes responsibility for the administrative management of the mayor's office.

The deputy mayor does not become "acting" or "interim" mayor, nor does the deputy mayor assume the "strong-mayor" powers, which are granted by the province to the head of council, a role which remains vacant.

=== Non-statutory deputy mayors ===
In 2014, city council approved the creation of three additional non-statutory deputy mayor positions. Non-statutory deputy mayors are members of council, appointed by the mayor, who advise them on local issues and represent them at events and ceremonies. Each (along with the first deputy mayor) represent a geographic area of the city, and are responsible for a specific policy role. The deputy mayors and the mayor meet each month to discuss efforts to bring the city together.

== History ==
From 1834 to 1857, and again from 1867 to 1873, Toronto mayors were not elected directly by the public. Instead, after each annual election of aldermen and councilmen, the assembled council would elect one of their members as mayor. For all other years, mayors were directly elected by popular vote, except in rare cases where a mayor was appointed by council to fill an unexpired term of office. Prior to 1834, Toronto municipal leadership was governed by the chairman of the General Quarter Session of Peace of the Home District Council.

Through 1955 the term of office for the mayor and council was one year; it then varied between two and three years until a four-year term was adopted starting in 2006. (See List of Toronto municipal elections.)

The City of Toronto has changed substantially over the years: the city annexed or amalgamated with neighbouring communities or areas 49 times from in 1883 to 1967. The most sweeping change was in 1998, when the six municipalities comprising Metropolitan Toronto—East York, Etobicoke, North York, Scarborough, York, and the former city of Toronto–and its regional government were amalgamated into a single City of Toronto (colloquially dubbed the "megacity") by an act of the provincial government. The newly created position of mayor for the resulting single-tier mega-city replaced all of the mayors of the former Metro municipalities. It also abolished the office of the Metro chairman, which had formerly been the most senior political figure in the Metro government before amalgamation. Since the creation of the "megacity" of Toronto, its mayor has been elected by the largest single-member electorate in Canada.

Fourteen out of the first 29 mayors were lawyers, and 58 of Toronto's 64 mayors (up to Ford) have been Protestant, white, English-speaking, Anglo-Saxon, property-owning males. There have been two women (Hall and Rowlands) and three Jewish mayors (Phillips, Givens and Lastman).

Art Eggleton is the longest-serving mayor of Toronto, serving from 1980 until 1991. Eggleton later served in federal politics from 1993 until 2004, and was appointed to the Senate of Canada in 2005. David Breakenridge Read held the post of mayor of Toronto for the shortest period. Read was mayor for only fifty days in 1858.

No Toronto mayor has been removed from office. Toronto's 64th mayor, Rob Ford, lost a conflict of interest trial in 2012, and was ordered to vacate his position; but the ruling was stayed pending an appeal, which Ford won to remain in office. Due to his substance abuse admission and controversy in 2013, Council stripped him of many powers on November 15, transferring them to the deputy mayor. From May until July 2014, Ford took a leave of absence from the mayoralty to enter drug rehabilitation.

== Post-amalgamation mayors of Toronto ==
The current City of Toronto was formed in 1998 from the amalgamation of Metro Toronto and its constituent municipalities. The following is a list of mayors of the current post-amalgamation Toronto.

No.	Photo	Mayor	Terms of office	Took office	Left office	Statutory Deputy Mayor
62		Mel Lastman	2	January 1, 1998	November 30, 2003	Case Ootes
63		David Miller	2	December 1, 2003	November 30, 2010	Joe Pantalone
64		Rob Ford	1	December 1, 2010	November 30, 2014	Doug Holyday (2010–2013) Norm Kelly (2013–2014)
65		John Tory	3	December 1, 2014	February 17, 2023	Denzil Minnan-Wong (2014–2022) Jennifer McKelvie (2022–2023)
Office vacant February 17 – July 12, 2023
66	Olivia Chow	Olivia Chow	1	July 12, 2023	—	Jennifer McKelvie (2023); Ausma Malik (2023—present)

== See also ==
- Toronto City Council
