= 2010 Toronto mayoral election =

- October 25, 2010
- Opinion polls
- Turnout: 50.6% (▲11.3 pp)
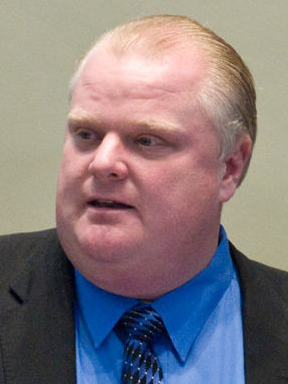

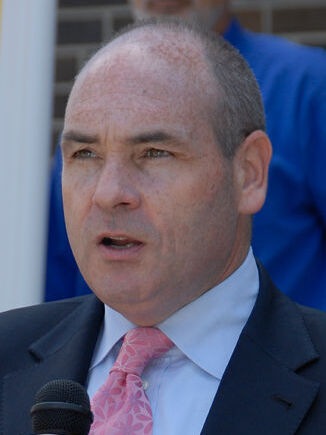

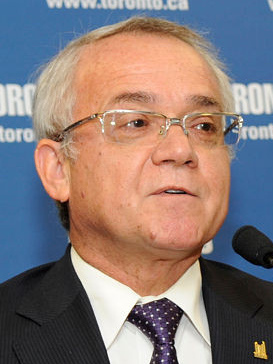
| Candidate | Rob Ford | George Smitherman | Joe Pantalone |
| Popular vote | 383,501 | 289,832 | 95,482 |
| Percentage | 47.1% | 35.6% | 11.7% |
- Results by ward

- Results by polling subdivision
Mayor before election
David Miller
Elected mayor
Rob Ford

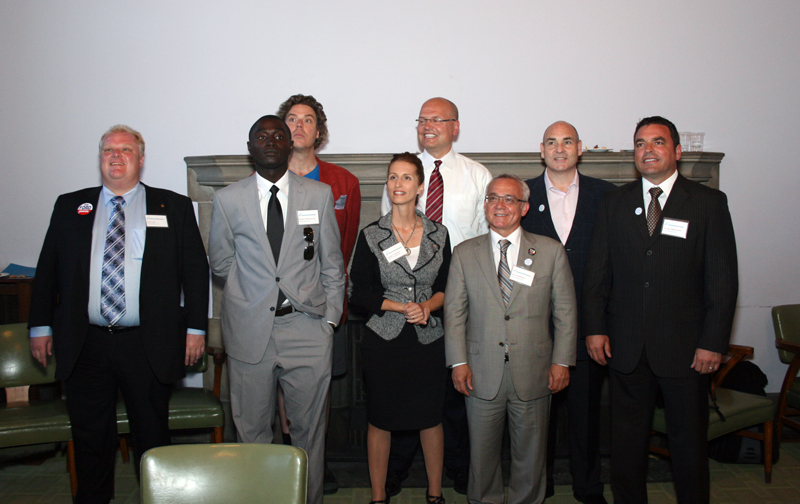
A number of the mayoral candidates at a campaign forum in June 2010

A mayoral election was held on October 25, 2010, to elect a mayor of the city of Toronto, Ontario, Canada. The mayor's seat was open for the first time since the 2003 Toronto election due to the announcement by incumbent mayor David Miller that he would not seek a third term in office. The nomination period for the 2010 municipal election opened on January 4, 2010, and closed on September 10, 2010. The result of the election was a victory for city councillor Rob Ford. He received 47% of the vote.

== Campaign ==
In the 2006 Toronto election, David Miller was easily reelected as mayor, winning 57% of the vote and leading in 42 of the city's 44 wards. On September 25, 2009, Miller announced that he would not be running for re-election. Prior to Miller's announcement important figures had already been contemplating mayoral bids, most notably Deputy Premier George Smitherman and former mayoral candidate and Progressive Conservative leader John Tory. Miller's withdrawal created an open race and the possibility of a wide field of candidates contesting the position. While there was speculation that Tory and Smitherman would both be contesting the race, Tory announced in January that he would not be a candidate. Tory's 2003 campaign manager and Liberal fundraiser Rocco Rossi announced he was running on December 14, 2009. Smitherman announced on November 8 that he was resigning from the provincial cabinet in order to run for mayor. They were joined in the campaign by right-wing councillors Giorgio Mammoliti and Rob Ford.

The left was initially split between two high-profile candidates: Deputy Mayor Joe Pantalone and TTC chair Adam Giambrone. Giambrone formally launched his campaign on February 1, 2010, but ended as sex scandal caused him to withdraw on February 10, 2010.

According to Ford campaign organizer Richard Ciano, the campaign disregarded "the conventional wisdom [that] conservatives don't win in Toronto". The campaign rejected the conventional strategy of focussing on specific areas. The campaign bypassed traditional media outlets and used telephone town hall events to call some 40,000 homes simultaneously and invite respondents to a talk-radio-style event hosted by Ford. This created grassroots momentum and facilitated small donations and grew the campaign's database.

Ford campaigned on ending wasteful spending at City Hall and campaign slogans such as "Stop the Gravy Train" and "respect for taxpayers" resonated with the public. His campaign's extensive internal polls showed that wasteful spending at City Hall was one of the biggest concerns among voters, although that "seemed to be the last thing any of the other candidates were talking about". Ford also pledged to do away with the city's century-old fair-wage policy, which required that private contractors be paid the same as union employees. It was said that Ford successfully tapped into recession-weary "ordinary" people who comprise the bulk of the population of Toronto, who were angry at perceived financial mismanagement at City Hall and powerful city employee unions with generous benefits and pension plans.

Ford's message of putting taxpayers' interests before that of labour and special interests was also said to have attracted wide support among diverse immigrant communities in the inner-city and suburbs (whose demographics contrast sharply with the "urbane creative class" of The Beach and the Annex neighborhoods). By contrast, "people knew precisely nothing about what George Smitherman stood for", according to a spokesman for George Smitherman, who was considered Ford's chief opponent.

Smitherman and other political opponents attempted to make an issue of Ford's past controversial statements and incidents. However, these did little to hurt Ford's popularity. A pollster found that "one middle-aged woman explained that she would overlook personality failings in a mayor – as long as he didn't waste her taxes". According to campaign staffers Richard Ciano and Nick Kouvalis, these personal attacks were turned into advantages by the Ford campaign, portraying rivals making these personal attacks as "trying to keep the gravy train going". The barbs directed at Ford generated more donations to his campaign, as did a deliberate lack of sophistication in style. According to Kouvalis "our polling said, don't put him in a $2,000 suit". The revelation of Ford's DUI conviction in Florida, and his subsequent public apology, led to an increase in support for Ford.

In June 2010, Ford and fellow councillors criticized retiring Councillor Kyle Rae for holding a retirement party at the Rosewater Club and billing the $12,000 cost to his office budget. Rae said that unspent campaign funds he was forced to turn over the city more than covered the cost, but critics pointed out that the campaign money was not his to spend. This example was used by Ford as an example of the "gravy train" at City Hall.

On August 17, 2010, the National Post reported that a computer user inside the Toronto Star company made edits to the Wikipedia article about Ford that his campaign considered "very serious libel" and copyright infringement. Bob Hepburn, a Toronto Star spokesman, denied responsibility for the edits. "The Toronto Star owns a couple of these IP portals and they come under Toronto Star Newspapers Limited, which is a broader thing. The Toronto Star itself has a separate portal", said Hepburn.

A Nanos Research poll, published on September 19, 2010, showed Ford doubling his lead from 12% to 24.5% over second-place candidate Smitherman (45.8% to 21.3% of decided voters). The Nanos Research Poll asked 1021 "likely voters" from September 14 and 16 with Rob Ford receiving 34.4% of likely voters, Smitherman 16%, Joe Pantalone 12% and undecided voters at 25%. A Global News Ipsos-Reid poll released Monday, September 27 showed Ford's lead diminishing at 28 per cent, with George Smitherman at 23 per cent, Joe Pantalone (who pledged to continue the policies of outgoing mayor David Miller) at 10 per cent, and Rocco Rossi and Sarah Thomson (who dropped from the race on September 28 and endorsed Smitherman) at seven per cent each. On October 22, an EKOS Research Poll found Ford with an 8 per cent lead over second place Smitherman in decided voters; 43.9% to 35.6%.

Ford also criticized Smitherman's previous record as provincial Minister of Health, where Smitherman had been responsible for approving most of the sole-sourced contracts before the scandal of eHealth Ontario erupted. A Ford spokesman said "the voters and the taxpayers of Toronto are going to get a very clear message from this information today that George Smitherman has no fiscal credibility to be mayor of Toronto. He is incapable of handling a budget".

On October 12, the campaign became nasty when signs were posted on University Avenue with the slogan "Wife-beating, racist drunk for mayor!" The anonymous signs were a veiled attack at leading candidate Rob Ford. All the leading candidates declared their disgust about the signs that were quickly removed. George Smitherman was also the subject of attack ads later in October, with a radio ad targeted to the Tamil Canadian community and a poster targeted to Muslim voters both suggesting that the communities had an obligation to support Ford, because he is married to a woman, over Smitherman, who is openly gay and married his partner in 2007.

=== Spending ===
Ford spent $1,723,605.77 on his campaign, which exceeded the mayoral campaign spending limit of $1,305,066.65. Smitherman's campaign spent $2.2 million. Campaign rules exclude a wide range of fund-raising expenditures, accounting for the over-spending. At the end of the campaign, the Ford campaign was $639,526.60 in debt, the Thomson campaign was $140,000 in debt and the Rossi campaign was $60,000 in debt, while the Smitherman campaign was debt-free. A special "Harmony" fund-raising dinner was held in January 2011 and the $1 million in proceeds used to pay off the debts. Pantalone's campaign finished $55,000 in debt, and he held his own fund-raiser to cover the debt after he declined to participate in the "Harmony" fund-raiser because of former premier Mike Harris's participation.

In April 2011, John Lorinc of The Globe and Mail wrote an article about the Ford campaign finances, noting that $69,722.31 of campaign expenses were paid by Doug Ford Holdings, the Ford family firm. The family firm also paid for a $22,713.04 contract to rent the Toronto Congress Centre for a campaign kickoff event. Both expenses were repaid but the borrowing may have constituted an illegal corporate contribution to the campaign. Activist Adam Chaleff-Freudenthaler and lawyer Max Reed filed a complaint about the Ford campaign's borrowing and over-spending to the City of Toronto Compliance Audit Committee. In May 2011, the committee voted to proceed with an audit of the mayor's campaign finances. Penalties under the Municipal Elections Act range from fines to removal from office. Ford first appealed the decision to audit the campaign, then dropped the appeal in April 2012. The city contracted the firm Froese Forensic Partners to conduct the audit. The audit found that the Ford campaign had overspent by $40,000, but the audit committee decided to not refer the violation to a special prosecutor.

== Results ==
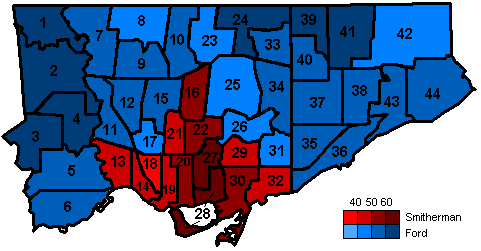
Mayoral results by ward

Official results from the City of Toronto as of October 28, 2010.

| Candidate | Number of votes | % of popular vote |
|---|---|---|
| Rob Ford | 383,501 | 47.114% |
| George Smitherman | 289,832 | 35.607% |
| Joe Pantalone | 95,482 | 11.730% |
| Rocco Rossi | 5,012 | 0.616% |
| George Babula | 3,273 | 0.402% |
| Rocco Achampong | 2,805 | 0.345% |
| Abdullah-Baquie Ghazi | 2,761 | 0.344% |
| Michael Alexander | 2,470 | 0.304% |
| Vijay Sarma | 2,264 | 0.277% |
| Sarah Thomson | 1,883 | 0.232% |
| Jaime Castillo | 1,874 | 0.231% |
| Dewitt Lee | 1,699 | 0.209% |
| Douglas Campbell | 1,428 | 0.176% |
| Kevin Clarke | 1,411 | 0.173% |
| Joseph Pampena | 1,319 | 0.162% |
| David Epstein | 1,202 | 0.148% |
| Monowar Hossain | 1,194 | 0.147% |
| Michael Flie | 1,190 | 0.146% |
| Don Andrews | 1,032 | 0.127% |
| Weizhen Tang | 890 | 0.11% |
| Daniel Walker | 804 | 0.098% |
| Keith Cole | 801 | 0.098% |
| Michael Brausewetter | 796 | 0.098% |
| Barry Goodhead | 740 | 0.091% |
| Charlene Cottle | 735 | 0.09% |
| Tibor Steinberger | 733 | 0.09% |
| Christopher Ball | 696 | 0.085% |
| James Di Fiore | 655 | 0.08% |
| Diane Devenyi | 629 | 0.078% |
| John Letonja | 592 | 0.073% |
| Himy Syed | 582 | 0.071% |
| Carmen Macklin | 575 | 0.07% |
| Howard Gomberg | 477 | 0.058% |
| David Vallance | 444 | 0.055% |
| Mark State | 438 | 0.054% |
| Phil Taylor | 429 | 0.053% |
| Colin Magee | 401 | 0.049% |
| Selwyn Firth | 394 | 0.049% |
| Ratan Wadhwa | 290 | 0.036% |
| Gerald Derome | 251 | 0.031% |
| Total | 813,984 | 100% |

== Issues ==
Several issues emerged early in the campaign. Transportation was one issue with debates over cycling and public transit. Bike lanes on streets such as Jarvis Street and University Avenue were one issue. Rocco Rossi was strongly opposed to such bike lanes (insisting that bike lanes instead be placed on parallel sideroads) while Pantalone supported them, Mammoliti endorsed the bike lanes on Jarvis, and Ford stated he would not remove any such installations.

The debate over public transit focused on Mayor Miller's Transit City initiative. Rocco Rossi called for a halt to Transit City and instead pushed for more subways in a plan he called "Transit City Plus", and also for the completion of the Allen Expressway in a tunnel along the cancelled Spadina Expressway alignment, to the Gardiner Expressway. Ford had long opposed the Transit City plan. Pantalone supported continuing the Transit City project. Sarah Thomson proposed replacing the planned LRT lines with subways paid for with road tolls. Smitherman had an ambitious transit plan, calling for expansions both to subway lines and to the Transit City plan, though his projected funding sources faced criticism.

Another important issue was how to pay for municipal services. One proposal was to sell city assets. Rossi proposed selling Toronto Hydro. Sarah Thomson called for restructuring TCHC and a line by line review of every department at city hall.

Four mayoral candidates (Rocco Rossi, George Smitherman, Joe Pantalone and Rob Ford) signed a pledge to give faith-based groups a bigger role in municipal government.

== Candidates ==
There were six "major" candidates running who were included by the media in public opinion polls and mayoral debates during the campaign, although by election day only three remained as active contenders: Ward 2 councillor Rob Ford, deputy mayor and Ward 19 councillor Joe Pantalone and former Liberal cabinet minister George Smitherman.

Giorgio Mammoliti was also included in debates until his withdrawal from the contest. Magazine editor Sarah Thomson announced on September 28, 2010, that she was ending her campaign, and former Liberal fundraiser Rocco Rossi dropped out of the campaign on October 13, 2010. Due to their late withdrawal, Thomson's and Rossi's names remained on the ballot.

=== Registered candidates ===
Candidates listed as registered on the City of Toronto website.

Rocco Achampong

- Date registered: January 4

Achampong, 32, was president of the Students' Administrative Council at the University of Toronto in 2002–03. Achampong is an alumnus of Delta Kappa Epsilon fraternity. At 18, he drove a getaway car in an armed robbery. He spent a year in jail. He calls the incident the "mistake of his life" and is now a lawyer.

He was one of two candidates, alongside the six "major" candidates and Keith Cole, selected by an online poll to participate in a debate on municipal voting reform sponsored by the civic advocacy group Better Ballots. When Giorgio Mammoliti subsequently withdrew from the race on July 5, 2010, he encouraged the media to give Achampong his former space in the mayoral debates.

Michael Alexander

- Date registered: September 9

Don Andrews

- Date registered: January 8

Andrews, 67, is a white supremacist and perennial candidate for mayor. He has run for Mayor of Toronto several times, most recently in 2003 when he came in tenth place with 0.17% of the vote, and has registered to run again in 2014. In 2003, two other party members ran unsuccessfully for Toronto city council. On one occasion, Andrews placed a distant second in the mayoralty race as no serious candidate ran against popular incumbent, David Crombie. As a result, the municipal law was changed so that the runner-up in the mayoralty contest no longer had the right to succeed to the mayor's chair should the position become vacant between elections.

George Babula

- Date registered: January 15

Babula was the candidate of the "Parkdale Party".

Christopher Ball

- Date registered: July 9

Michael Brausewetter

- Date registered: September 9

Douglas Campbell

- Date registered: January 4

Campbell contested for the leadership of the federal and provincial New Democratic Party on five occasions, beginning in 1970. Campbell resurfaced in 1988 as a fringe candidate for mayor of North York. Most recently, Campbell has run for Mayor of Toronto in 2000, 2003 and 2006, receiving 1.2% and 0.3% of the vote in the first two contests respectively. During the 2006 campaign he was quoted as saying "the answer is public ownership of land. Businessmen are going to nuclearize the planet. If you vote for a capitalist candidate, you're voting to kill children".

James Castillo

- Date registered: February 23

Castillo is a supporter of multiculturalism.

Kevin Clarke

- Date registered: April 30

Clarke, 46, is a perennial candidate for public office in Toronto. For several years, he was also one of the most recognizable homeless persons in the city. He has over 90 convictions, with only two that weren't dismissed. The majority of these charges stem from his loud campaigns at large public events and busy street corners. He also claims to be the first arrest of the Toronto G-20 summit, a week in advance. Although he was taking off a rollerblade, a Royal Canadian Mounted Police officer who claimed he was urinating against a wall near the Rogers Centre attacked him by surprise and violently handcuffed him. He was not charged, but was told to leave the area, or be arrested. He frequently sings and preaches on the streets of Toronto while wearing long, flowing blankets or robes, which he uses for warmth in case he is arrested and detained in prison. Clarke also campaigned for Mayor of Toronto in the 2000, 2003 and 2006 municipal elections. His primary issues are children's rights, homeless rights, street safety and water safety. He is also strongly against police corruption and abuse of authority. He ran the 2001 campaign out of a homeless shelter that he used every night. He is known for crashing political debates, and disrupting his opponents' campaigns, which have gotten him banned from many political events. Clarke originally registered in January but withdrew his candidacy on March 31 before subsequently resubmitting his nomination.

Keith Cole

- Date registered: February 16

Cole is an openly gay performance artist and female impersonator associated with the Buddies in Bad Times theatre. His campaign focused on gay rights, cycling and the arts.

Charlene Cottle

- Date registered: May 20

Gerald Derome

- Date registered: August 25

Diane Devenyi

- Date registered: September 10

James Di Fiore

- Date registered: August 10

Di Fiore is a hip-hop artist and freelance journalist best known for the controversy following a piece he wrote for Now Magazine exposing poor security at polling stations against voting multiple times in an election, a point he demonstrated by procuring multiple ballots in the 2004 federal election. As a result, Di Fiore was charged under the Canada Elections Act and fined $250.

David Epstein

- Date registered: August 25

Epstein, 32, is a Toronto business owner, director of a not-for-profit organization, humanitarian and human rights activist. His campaign slogan was "Lead by Example". Epstein supported dramatic tax reductions for Toronto citizens.

Selwyn Firth

- Date registered: January 29

A chemical engineer by profession. His campaign slogan was "science should trump emotions". Firth supported completion of the Spadina Expressway and trash incineration.

Michael Flie

- Date registered: June 30

Advocated European style bicycle lanes and better urban planning.

Rob Ford

- Endorsements: Councillor Frances Nunziata, Councillor Mike Del Grande, Councillor Giorgio Mammoliti, Councillor Peter Milczyn, Councillor John Parker, Councillor Doug Holyday, former mayoralty candidate Wendell Brereton.
- Date registered: March 25

Ford, 40, had been an Etobicoke North city councillor for 10 years, was a conservative and Miller critic. Campaign promises included repealing the vehicle registration tax, repealing the land transfer tax, making the Toronto Transit Commission an essential service, and working to cut the number of councillors on city council by half.

Abdullah-Baquie Ghazi

- Date registered: January 5

Ghazi ran for councillor from Ward 28 (Toronto Centre) in 2006 and received 3.3% of the vote. He proposed a reduction in the price of Metropasses, introducing toll roads, reducing property taxes and increasing the size of city council.

Howard Gomberg

- Date registered: January 15

Gomberg, 71, was an actor and rapper.

Barry Goodhead

- Date registered: August 13

Goodhead proposed cutting the Toronto police budget and allowing residents to elect the police chief.

Monowar Hossain

- Date registered: January 4

Hossain had previously campaigned unsuccessfully for mayor in 2006, receiving 2,726 votes, and for the Toronto District School Board in 2000 and for Mayor of Toronto in 2003. He moved to Canada from India in 1983 due to what he describes as "political issues". He trained as a lawyer, later worked as a security officer, and was studying to be an investment adviser in 2003. Hossain's first mayoral campaign was highlighted by a promise to provide food and housing for Toronto's unemployed to bring them into the workforce. In 2006, he described himself as the "Dealienation Advocate" and said that he would rescue people from "traps" like psychologists and laboratory experimentation.

Dewitt Lee

- Date registered: July 14

Lee campaigned as the city's Christian candidate.

John Letonja

- Date registered: January 4

Letonja wanted to overhaul the TTC and turn Toronto into a hub for recycling.

Carmen Macklin

- Date registered: August 25

Colin Magee

- Date registered: January 6

Magee was a Beer Store employee and supported increased civic engagement.

Jim McMillan

- Date registered: July 19

Joseph Pampena

- Date registered: January 13

JP Pampena, a blind public relations agent, ran on the slogan "the man with the vision". He promised to raise revenue for the city by selling the naming rights of pools and recreation centres. His ideas include listing the City of Toronto on the Toronto Stock Exchange. In the past he supported the vigilante Guardian Angels in their attempts to expand to Toronto.

Joe Pantalone

- Endorsements: Mayor David Miller, Jack Layton, MP for Toronto-Danforth and NDP leader, Rosario Marchese, MPP for Trinity-Spadina, Councillor Howard Moscoe, Councillor Cesar Palacio, Councillor Gord Perks, Councillor Paula Fletcher, Councillor Sandra Bussin, Councillor Maria Augimeri, Councillor Mark Grimes, Councillor Janet Davis, John Laschinger, Mike Layton, Laborers' International Union of North America Local 506.
- Date registered: January 13

Pantalone, 57, was deputy mayor under David Miller and had been a city councillor for what is now Trinity-Spadina for almost 30 years. He was also a former provincial NDP candidate. Pantalone highlighted his experience in municipal politics compared to other candidates saying, "people are looking around at the outsiders and think their experience does not match mine," and said the approach to the city's finances should be "clinical as opposed to a sledgehammer." He pledged to use the next four years "to solidify and protect our services". Said he would build Transit City and partner with the private sector but would not privatize services.

Vijay Sarma

- Date registered: September 2

George Smitherman

- Endorsements: Former mayors David Crombie, John Sewell, and Art Eggleton, Sarah Thomson former mayoral candidate, Councillor Pam McConnell, Councillor Joe Mihevc, Councillor Chin Lee, Councillor Adam Vaughan, Bob Rae, Liberal MP for Toronto-Centre and former premier of Ontario, Jeff Bangs, former principal secretary to Ernie Eves; Ralph Lean, Conservative and former fundraising chair for Miller and Tory; Former Ontario Conservative cabinet ministers Isabel Bassett, Dan Newman and Charles Harnick, Conservative Senator Nancy Ruth, Carpenters’ District Council of Ontario
- Date registered: January 8

Smitherman was the former Liberal MPP for Toronto Centre and former Deputy Premier of Ontario. Resigned from cabinet to run for mayor. Former chief of staff to former mayor Barbara Hall. Smitherman said he would consider toll roads in order to raise revenue and the use of public-private partnerships in public works projects such as rapid transit expansion. He also called for the reduction or elimination of the city's $60 motor registration fee.

Mark State

- Date registered: January 4

State, 67, ran for mayor in 2006 and placed last with 194 votes. A retired engineer, State wished to return Toronto to a state of economic self-sufficiency through capital investment and a more vigilant approach to planning.

Tibor Steinberger

- Date registered: June 3

Steinberger advocated floating houses as a solution to the city's housing problems, more red light cameras to catch driving infractions and electronic transit fares.

Himy Syed

- Date registered: May 25

Syed was a candidate for councillor in Ward 19 but withdrew to run for mayor. He was the founding editor of Torontopedia.ca, executive director of the Canadian Muslim Civil Liberties Association and described himself as an "Islamic banker". Syed advocated "citizen's rights" as part of his platform.

Weizhen Tang

- Date registered: September 9

Tang was a former investment fund manager and self-proclaimed "Chinese Warren Buffett" who faced fraud charges for allegedly defrauding investors of $30 million in a Ponzi scheme.

Phil Taylor

- Date registered: July 12

Taylor was described as a self-help guru. He had five core principles he wanted the city to adopt.

David Vallance

- Date registered: June 10

Vallance advocated giving Toronto provincial status.

Ratan Wadhwa

- Date registered: April 6

Advocated the construction of casinos and the creation of a red light district.

Daniel Walker

- Date registered: July 6

Walker was a minister in the Church of the Universe and advocated the legalization of marijuana.

=== Candidates who ended their campaigns after the withdrawal deadline ===
The last date to withdraw from the election was September 10. Candidates who ended their campaigns after that date remained on the ballot.

Rocco Rossi

- Endorsements: Councillor Mike Feldman, Councillor John Parker, Samuel Goldstein, former federal Conservative candidate and former adviser to candidate Sarah Thomson; Rob Sinclair, "Red Tory" and former David Miller campaigner; Andy Pringle, former provincial Conservative candidate and chief of staff to John Tory; John Capobianco; Peter C. Newman; IUOE Local 793; Warren Kinsella.
- Date registered: January 4
- Campaign ended: October 13

Rossi, 47, was a Toronto-based federal Liberal Party organizer and senior advisor to Michael Ignatieff. He issued a statement denying interest in running in October 2009 but changed his mind, resigning in December as Liberal Party policy director to run for mayor. He promised to reduce and freeze the mayor's salary and sell off Toronto Hydro and other city assets if he became mayor. Rossi registered as a candidate on January 4 becoming the first candidate to file papers. Rossi proposed to remove and prohibit bike lanes from major streets, freeze construction of rapid transit lines and replace the Toronto Transit Commission's board with private sector experts.

Sarah Thomson

- Endorsements: Former newspaper publisher Conrad Black.
- Date officially registered: January 4
- Campaign ended: September 28

Thomson, 42, was CEO and founder of the Women's Post, a national magazine for business women. She proposed to open up city services to competitive bidding from the private sector and build subway lines instead of the TTC's planned streetcar-based rapid transit lines which would be paid by a $5 rush hour toll on the Don Valley Parkway and Gardiner Expressway. Previously, she ran unsuccessfully for city council in Hamilton, Ontario. She was endorsed by former newspaper publisher Conrad Black. An April 2010 poll by the Toronto Star stated that Thompson had the support of 7% of respondents. On September 28, Thompson ended her campaign and threw her support to George Smitherman in order to defeat Rob Ford.

=== Candidates who withdrew ===
Andrew Barton

- Date registered: January 11
- Date withdrew: August 19

Barton, 27, is a science fiction writer and blogger.

Wendell Brereton

- Date registered: February 23
- Date withdrawn: August 4

Rev. Brereton was a fundamentalist pastor in Toronto's Regent Park neighbourhood and former 12-year veteran of the Ontario Provincial Police. Brereton was opposed to same-sex marriage and decriminalizing marijuana and believed the city had become too "progressive". Brereton withdrew from the mayoral contest on August 4, 2010, in order to run for city council in Ward 6, and threw his support to Rob Ford.

Mark Cidade

- Date registered: January 11
- Date withdrawn: July 9

Stephen Feek

- Date registered: January 4
- Date withdrawn: March 9

Mell Findlay

- Date registered: February 25
- Date withdrawn: March 25

Adam Giambrone

- Endorsements: John Laschinger, Miller's campaign manager in 2003 and 2006. City councillors Maria Augimeri, Glenn De Baeremaeker and Howard Moscoe.
- Date registered: February 1
- Date withdrawal announced: February 10
- Date withdrawn: March 10

Giambrone, 32, was city councillor for Davenport, a Miller supporter, and chair of the Toronto Transit Commission. Former president of the New Democratic Party. Giambrone announced his candidacy February 1 and announced nine days later that he was dropping out of the race after being involved in a sex scandal.

Naseeb Husain

- Date registered: January 25
- Date withdrawn: March 26

Ange Maniccia

- Date registered: January 4
- Date withdrawn: January 5

Giorgio Mammoliti

- Date registered: January 5
- Date withdrawn: July 9

Mammoliti, 48, had been York West city councillor since 1995. Mammoliti served on Miller's executive committee. The National Post described him as "a former union leader and New Democratic Party MPP, [who] has transformed himself into a 'right-of-centre' city councillor, who champions such law-and-order issues as calling in the army to crack down on drug crime and gangs." More recently, Mammoliti was a member of the Liberal Party but will allow his membership to expire in 2010. When announcing his candidacy he unveiled a platform that included building a casino, introducing a municipal lottery, reversing tax increases he had previously voted for and creating a red light district for prostitution. He also promised budget cuts and intended to target the $40 million in annual city grants to arts, cultural and community groups but was opposed to cutting salaries for elected officials. He also called for cars to be banned from the Gardiner Expressway, converting the thoroughfare into a garden, implementing road tolls. Mammoliti announced his withdrawal on July 5 and made it official four days later.

Sonny Yeung

- Date registered: January 8
- Date withdrawn: September 10

Yeung, 35, ran for council in 2003 in Ward 41 (Scarborough-Rouge River) where he won 25.4% of the vote losing to Bas Balkissoon in a two-person contest. He ran in the same ward in 2006 and received 2.5% placing seventh in a ten candidate field. Yeung withdrew from the mayoral election in order to run for public school trustee.

=== Candidates who died ===
Tom Sullivan

- Date registered: February 17
- Died: April 7

Sullivan died at the age of 75. According to his obituary, "Sullivan was born in London, Ontario on January 11, 1935 and moved to Toronto in the 1950s. He led a varied and productive working life which included accounting and taxi cab ownership."

=== Possible candidates who did not run ===
The following potential candidates ruled themselves out of seeking the mayor's office or failed to indicate interest following media speculation of their potential candidacy:

- Shelley Carroll – Don Valley East city councillor, Toronto Budget Chief and Liberal. Considered a Miller supporter. She told the National Post in October that she was "definitely considering” running for mayor. On January 12, she told reporters that she will not be a candidate. However, with the withdrawal of Giambrone from the race she was reportedly reconsidering. She "couldn't be swayed to enter" the mayoral contest and was re-elected as the city councillor for her ward.
- Olivia Chow – Trinity Spadina NDP Member of Parliament and former city councillor from 1991 to 2005. Expressed no interest.
- Michael "Pinball" Clemons – ex-football player and currently vice-chair of the Toronto Argonauts. Neither a Canadian citizen nor a resident of Toronto. Has expressed no interest.
- Doug Holyday – Etobicoke Centre councillor and conservative subject of a "Draft Doug" movement during the garbage strike. Says he is not considering a bid.
- Gerard Kennedy – Liberal Party of Canada MP and former provincial cabinet minister, ruled out a run after rumours with his name surfaced.
- Frances Lankin – president and CEO of United Way Toronto. Former NDP MPP for Beaches—Woodbine (later Beaches—East York) and senior cabinet minister in the Bob Rae government. Has expressed no interest in running and is not currently a resident of Toronto as she lives in Restoule, Ontario near North Bay with her husband.
- Jack Layton – leader of the federal New Democratic Party and, formerly, a long-time Toronto city councillor and runner-up in the 1991 mayoralty election. Layton has ruled out returning to municipal politics.
- Glen Murray – former mayor of Winnipeg and federal Liberal candidate, and CEO of the Canadian Urban Institute. Has lived in Toronto since 2004. Ran for, and won, the February 4, 2010 byelection to succeed George Smitherman as MPP for Toronto Centre.
- Peggy Nash – president of the New Democratic Party, Canadian Auto Workers official and former NDP MP for Parkdale—High Park. Nash instead decided to return to federal politics and was re-elected to Parliament in the 2011 federal election.
- Robert Pritchard – former president of the University of Toronto. President of Metrolinx. Has denied having mayoral ambitions.
- Karen Stintz – Eglinton-Lawrence city councillor and leader of the conservative oppositional Responsible Government Group. Dropped out October 19, 2009. Following John Tory's announcement that he will not be a candidate Stintz reaffirmed her decision not to contest the mayoralty.
- Michael Thompson – Scarborough Centre city councillor, conservative, and Miller critic.
- John Tory – runner up to Miller in the 2003 mayoral election, former leader of the Ontario Progressive Conservative Party and afternoon drive time host on CFRB radio. Tory announced on January 7 that he was not running in order to continue his radio show and also become head of the Toronto City Summit Alliance. Tory re-iterated his decision not to run on August 5, 2010, after a week of speculation that he was going to enter the contest. After the election, Ford's staff revealed a targeted campaign involving a fake social media account intended to convince Tory not to run.
- Adam Vaughan – Trinity-Spadina city councillor and former municipal affairs reporter. In the wake of Miller's withdrawal from the campaign, Vaughan told reporters that he won't run for mayor because "I can't get inside the heads of those people who live in the suburbs", and because he wants to be around for his family.

=== Satirical candidates ===
The 2010 election was also noted for the participation of two mock candidates who conducted satirical campaigns through social networking platforms. Murray4Mayor was spearheaded by National Post cartoonist Steve Murray, while The Rebel Mayor was written in the persona of 19th century Toronto mayor William Lyon Mackenzie. After the election it was revealed that The Rebel Mayor was written by Shawn Micallef, a journalist for Eye Weekly and Spacing.

== Opinion polls ==
Italics indicate those politicians who ended their campaigns before election day.

| Polling Firm | Date of Polling | Link | Rob Ford | Joe Pantalone | George Smitherman | Rocco Rossi | Sarah Thomson | Other | Sample Size | % Undecided |
|---|---|---|---|---|---|---|---|---|---|---|
| EKOS | 2010-Oct-20 – 2010-Oct-22 | PDF | 48.2 | 14.7 | 33.3 | - | - | 3.8 | 275 | 15.1 |
| EKOS | 2010-Oct-13 – 2010-Oct-21 | PDF | 43.9 | 15.0 | 35.6 | - | - | 5.5 | 433 | 15.9 |
| Toronto Sun/Léger | 2010-Oct-15 – 2010-Oct-18 | HTML | 31 | 10 | 30 | - | - | 6 | 600 | 23 |
| Ipsos Reid | 2010-Oct-15 – 2010-Oct-17 | HTML | 33 | 13 | 31 | - | - | - | 500 | 20 |
| Nanos Research | 2010-Oct-14 – 2010-Oct-16 | PDF | 43.9 | 15.0 | 40.5 | - | - | - | 1000 | 18.5 |
| Angus Reid | 2010-Oct-14 – 2010-Oct-15 | HTML | 41 | 16 | 40 | - | - | 3 | 1001 | ? |
| Forum Research | 2010-Oct-14 | HTML | 44 | 16 | 38 | dropped out Oct. 13 | - | - | 700 | ? |
| Ipsos Reid | 2010-Oct-09 – 2010-Oct-11 | HTML | 39.5 | 14.5 | 40.8 | 5.3 | dropped out Sept. 28 | - | 400 | 25 |
| Ipsos Reid | 2010-Sep-24 – 2010-Sep-26 | HTML | 34 | 12 | 28 | 8 | 8 | 10 | 400 | 17 |
| Nanos Research | 2010-Sep-14 – 2010-Sep-16 | HTML | 45.8 | 16.8 | 21.3 | 9.7 | 6.4 | - | 1021 | 25 |
| Toronto Star/Angus Reid | 2010-Sep-14 – 2010-Sep-15 | PDF | 39 | 13 | 26 | 6 | 11 | 3 | 502 | 36 |
| Pollara | 2010-Sep-08 – 2010-Sep-12 | HTML | 46 | 11 | 24 | 7 | 10 | - | 700 | 22 |
| Forum Research | 2010-Aug-30 – 2010-Aug-31 | HTML | 34 | 11 | 22 | 15 | 14 | 4 | 400 | 33 |
| Toronto Star/Angus Reid | 2010-Aug-25 – 2010-Aug-26 | HTML | 42 | 11 | 36 | 5 | 6 | 1 | 501 | 28 |
| National Post/Ipsos Reid | 2010-Aug-20 – 2010-Aug-22 | HTML | 41 | 11 | 27 | 13 | 11 | - | 400 | 21 |
| Pollstra Research | 2010-Jul-30 – 2010-Aug-05 | HTML | 37.6 | 15.5 | 28.7 | 7.9 | 10.3 | - | 432 | 32 |
| Forum Research | 2010-Jun-11 – 2010-Jun-13 | HTML | 26 | 12 | 29 | 10 | 17 | Giorgio Mammoliti – 4 | 405 | 44 |
| Nanos Research | 2010-Jun-07 – 2010-Jun-11 | HTML | 29.2 | 16.6 | 26.1 | 14.8 | 9.5 | Giorgio Mammoliti – 4.1 | 1000 | 40 |
| Environics | 2010-Apr-19 – 2010-May-08 | HTML | 27 | 9 | 34 | 13 | 14 | Giorgio Mammoliti – 4 | 485 | 44 |
| Angus Reid | 2010-Apr-08 – 2010-Apr-12 | HTML | 27 | 14 | 34 | 13 | 7 | Giorgio Mammoliti – 4 | 413 | 51 |
| Vision Critical (previously Angus Reid Strategies) | 2010-Jan-08 – 2010-Jan-11 | HTML | - | 5 | 44 | 15 | - | Shelley Carroll – 5, Adam Giambrone – 17, Giorgio Mammoliti – 4 | 503 | 58 |
| Angus Reid | 2009-Oct-22 – 2009-Oct-25 | HTML | - | - | 21 | - | - | John Tory – 46, Adam Giambrone – 14, Glen Murray – 8, Denzil Minnan-Wong – 3, Giorgio Mammoliti – 1 | | |
