= Toronto Centre =

Toronto Centre may refer to:

- Toronto Centre (federal electoral district), federal riding in Toronto, Ontario, Canada
- Toronto Centre (provincial electoral district), provincial riding in Toronto, Ontario, Canada
- Ward 13 Toronto Centre, municipal ward in Toronto, Ontario, Canada
