= John Laschinger =

Canadian political consultant

John Laschinger is a Canadian political strategist and author. He is best known for his work as a campaign manager, organizing election campaigns and party leadership bids for a variety of candidates. He has written several books, including Leaders & lesser mortals: Backroom politics in Canada and Campaign Confessions: Tales from the War Rooms of Politics.

== Career ==
=== Conservative campaigns and early work ===
In 1983, Laschinger was campaign manager for John Crosbie, a candidate for leadership of the Progressive Conservative Party of Canada. In 1984, he was campaign manager for the Larry Grossman in his bid for leadership of the Ontario Progressive Conservative Party, an effort he repeated for Grossman in the party's 1985 leadership campaign. Laschinger was a key organizer for Belinda Stronach's bid to lead the Conservative Party of Canada in 2004, and John Tory's bid to lead the Progressive Conservative Party of Ontario also in 2004. He then worked as campaign manager for the Progressive Conservative Party of Ontario in the 2007 general election.

Laschinger also worked on other conservative campaigns in Canada, including New Brunswick and Manitoba.

In late 1990, Laschinger worked with a group of Canadians led by McMaster University professor Howard Aster on a trip to Ukraine to teach political leaders in the newly independent country about how political parties operate in democracies.

=== Progressive campaigns and municipal politics ===
Known for working with Conservatives, Laschinger was an important figure in the New Democrat-aligned David Miller's bid to become Mayor of Toronto in 2003 and was his campaign manager in 2006. During the 2010 Toronto mayoral election, he was campaign manager for Adam Giambrone until his departure from the race, which led Laschinger to join Miller's deputy mayor Joe Pantalone in his unsuccessful run for mayor.

In 2014 Toronto mayoral election, Laschinger managed his 50th campaign, working as campaign director for former MP and councillor Olivia Chow.
