= Sarah Thomson (publisher) =

Canadian politician (born 1968)

Sarah Jane Thomson, also known as Sarah Jane Whatmough-Thomson, (born 1968) is an entrepreneur who was publisher and CEO of the Women's Post and a former candidate for mayor of Toronto.

== Early career ==
Thomson was born Sarah Jane Whatmough in Toronto and grew up in Burlington, Ontario. After dropping out of high school at 15, leaving home, and spending several months couch surfing and living on the streets, she began working at a gas station at age 16 and progressed quickly to become a manager, and Sunoco franchise dealer, until at the age of 18, she founded a company to manage and turnaround struggling gas stations. Thomson claims that her management company grossed over $30 million a year with more than 200 employees.

While building her management company, Thomson enrolled at McMaster University, in Hamilton, Ontario as a mature student at the age of 21 to study Philosophy and English.

In her twenties, Thomson became involved in restoring old homes. She created a small bookstore in her home and went through a long and drawn out rezoning process that drew her into politics.

As Sarah Whatmough, she ran in the 1997 municipal election for one of two Hamilton City Council seats in Ward One, but was unsuccessful in her bid, placing fourth with 19.4% of the vote.

== Publishing career ==
In 1998, she founded a community newspaper in Hamilton, the Hamilton Examiner. After she sold it, she moved to Toronto, and established the Women's Post, a nationally distributed publication aimed at professional women, in 2002, also meeting and marrying Greg Thomson the same year.

The Women's Post was initially a biweekly newspaper before becoming a magazine in 2008 published, at various times, weekly, monthly, bimonthly, and then quarterly. In 2012, it ended its regular print edition and became an online daily publication, womenspost.ca before becoming inactive in 2019.

== Political career ==
=== 2010 Toronto mayoral election ===
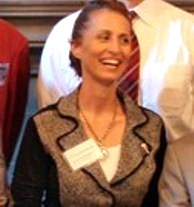
Thomson at the 2010 Toronto Mayoral debate held in June

Sarah Thomson registered as a candidate for election as Mayor of Toronto on January 4, 2010.

An April 2010 poll by the Toronto Star stated that Thomson had the support of 7% of respondents, but by June a poll showed her support had risen to 17%, putting her in third place.

Thomson was supported by former mayoral candidate John Tory's two sons. George Tory was appointed her campaign manager while John Tory, Jr., was a key campaign strategist. Her candidacy was endorsed by Conrad Black.

Among Thomson's ideas for the city was a call for subway expansion in Toronto. From this, she garnered the moniker "Subway Sarah" and was accused of having "Tunnel Vision" She suggested tolls be placed on the Gardiner Expressway and the Don Valley Parkway to cover the cost of subway expansion. Thomson also advocated restructuring the Toronto Community Housing Corporation to enable non-profit organizations already providing key care to obtain the funding they require to deliver better service than city run programs.

In early June, one poll had Thomson in third place at 17% ahead of candidates Rocco Rossi and Joe Pantalone, but after falling to 7%, behind Pantalone and tied with Rossi, Thomson withdrew from the campaign on September 28. She subsequently supported George Smitherman in a failed effort to prevent frontrunner Rob Ford from becoming mayor. Her withdrawal occurred too late to be removed from the ballot and she received 1,883 votes or 0.232% support in the final count.

=== Provincial politics ===
On March 9, 2011, Thomson announced that she was planning to run as a candidate for the Ontario Liberal Party in the riding of Trinity—Spadina in the October 2011 provincial election. Thomson was nominated as the party's candidate at a meeting on March 27 and, in the general election, placed second with 18,731 votes (39.93%), 1,139 votes behind incumbent Rosario Marchese of the Ontario New Democratic Party.

=== Between elections ===
From 2011 to 2017, Thomson was chair and volunteer CEO of the Toronto Transit Alliance, a non-profit organization which ran educational campaigns and advocated for increased funding for transit, sustainable urban transportation design, and transit expansion. The organization hosted the Green Cities 2017 conference in Toronto.

On March 8, 2013, Thomson accused Toronto's mayor Rob Ford of groping her while he was inebriated - claiming she thought he was on cocaine. This included inappropriately grabbing her buttocks and suggesting that she "should have been in Florida with him because his wife wasn't there." Ford denied Thomson's allegations. Later, two Richmond Hill councillors, who were at the event, came forward stating that they had witnessed Thomson asking her assistant to stage a photograph so it would look like Ford was groping her, so that she could use it against him in the mayoral campaign.

=== 2014 Toronto mayoral election ===
On March 20, 2014, Thomson arrived at Toronto City Hall in a horse-drawn cart in order to register as a candidate in the 2014 mayoral election. Because of her low poll numbers, she was not included in all-candidates debates although she claimed that she was polling in fifth place.

In July, Thomson arrived on horseback at "Ford Fest", an annual picnic organized by Mayor Rob Ford and his family. She faced a possible $100 fine for violating a by-law against riding a horse in a public park but the city did not impose a fine. In August, Thomson apologized for robocalling voters at 1:00 in the morning.

Her 2014 campaign was known for numerous bizarre antics, including doing her hair in dreadlocks, having a video interview conducted by her grade-school son, and making a music video parody of 'Timber'. Some suggested that she was trying to appeal to Blacks using these cultural signifiers despite being Caucasian.

A Nanos Research poll conducted at the end of August estimated Thomson's support at 0.7 percent of the popular vote.

=== City council candidate, 2014 ===
On September 3, 2014, Thomson posted a poll on her website asking voters whether she should continue her candidacy for mayor or withdraw and run for city councillor instead. On September 9, two days before the deadline for candidate registration, Thomson withdrew from the mayoral election and registered as a candidate for councillor for Ward 20 Trinity—Spadina instead. She garnered less than 10% of the votes, placed third and lost to Joe Cressy.

=== 2018 sexual harassment allegation ===
In February 2018, Thomson published an article in Women's Post alleging that inappropriate sexual comments were made to her by an unnamed television host at a luncheon during her 2010 run for mayor. TVOntario confirmed in a statement that Thomson's allegation was directed at Steve Paikin, host of the network's The Agenda current affairs program, and that it was launching a third-party investigation. Paikin denied the allegations, calling them "100% false" and describing Thomson's comments as defamation. The network stated that, "based on the evidence to date, TVO sees no reason to remove Mr. Paikin from his role as host for The Agenda."

In April 2018, an independent investigation commissioned by TVO cleared Paikin of the allegations made by Thomson finding that while Thomson genuinely believed Paikin propositioned her, the evidence did not support her account of what happened. The investigator found that Thomson "tended to make leaps without sufficient evidence to do so and she linked evidence together without factual foundation. Thomson's evidence also veered toward being exaggerated and untrue."

== Barbados ==
Thomson moved to Barbados in mid-2018. There she owns and operates a boutique hotel and eco-tourist resort and community arts centre.

== Personal ==
Sarah and Greg Thomson married in 2002 and divorced in 2020. They have two children.
