= Rocco Rossi =

Canadian lobbyist and businessman (born 1962)

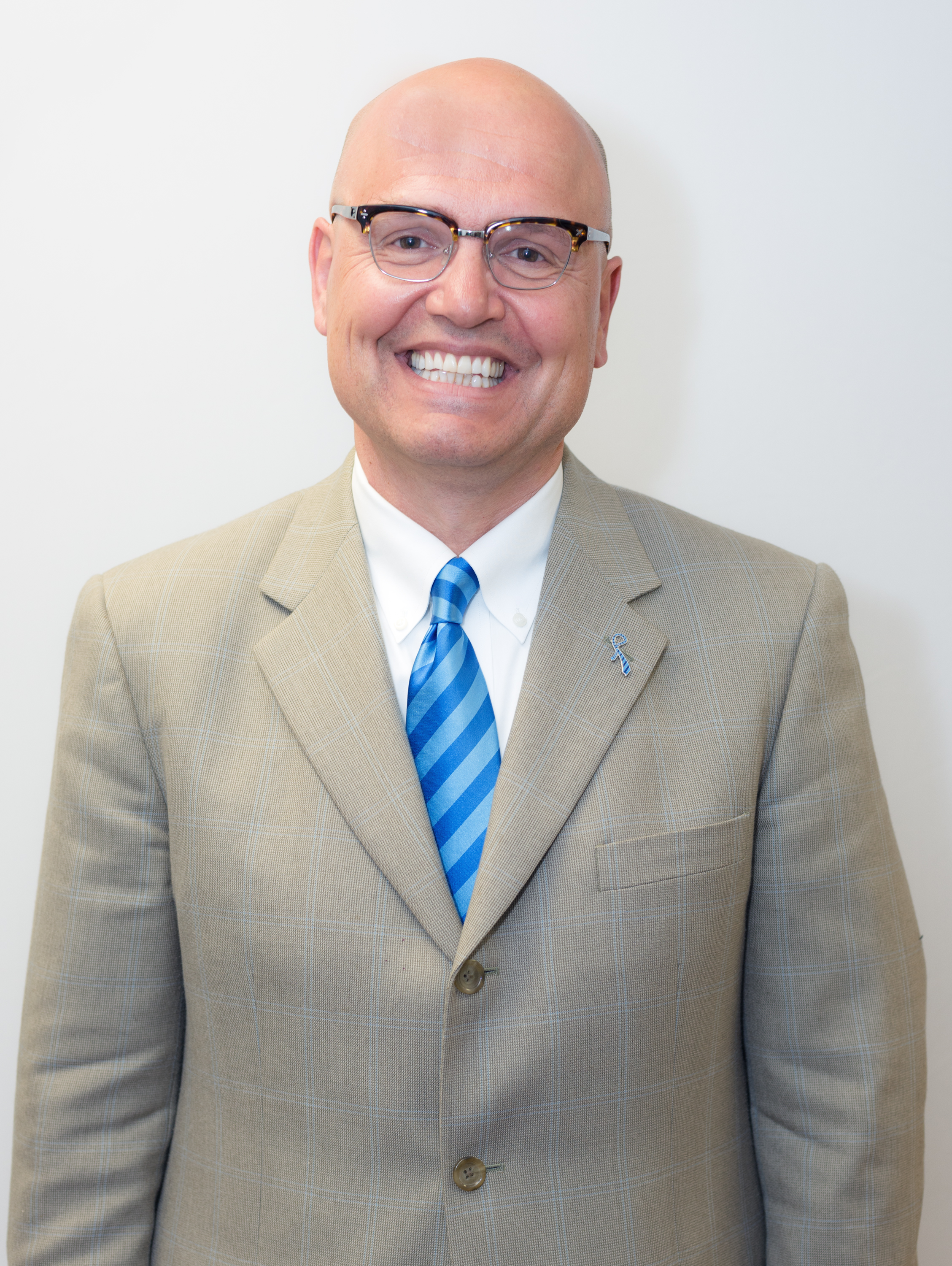
- Rossi in 2013
- Born: February 6, 1962 (age 64); Toronto, Ontario
- Occupations: President & CEO of Ontario Chamber of Commerce, Lobbyist

Rocco Rossi (born February 6, 1962) is a Canadian businessman currently serving as president and chief executive officer of the Ontario Chamber of Commerce, and was formerly the president and CEO of Prostate Cancer Canada.

== Background ==
Rossi attended schools in Canada and the United States. He attended Upper Canada College (UCC). After graduating from UCC, Rossi studied at McGill University in Montreal, followed by studies at Princeton University in New Jersey, where he graduated with a master's degree in politics.

== Career ==
After graduating from Princeton, Rossi returned to Toronto to pursue a career in the private sector with roles at Advanced Material Resources (now NeoMaterials), the Boston Consulting Group, Torstar, Labatt/Interbrew and MGI Software. He was recruited from Torstar by Interbew and became president of beer.com.

Rossi was the chief executive officer of the Heart and Stroke Foundation of Ontario from 2004 to 2009. Under Rossi's leadership the Heart and Stroke Foundation built a $130-million reserve of tax-receipted funds. While some have criticized collecting and not using millions in funds for which tax exemptions were issued, Rossi has remarked, "It's a criticism I will bear with honour... I'm proud that we built a healthy, long-term balance sheet".

In 2013, Rossi was appointed chief executive officer of Prostate Cancer Canada.

Rossi became President and CEO of the Ontario Chamber of Commerce in 2017.

Rossi has sat on numerous boards including the United Way of Greater Toronto, AMR, the Ivey Foundation, the Internet Advertising Bureau of Canada, Toronto's 2008 Olympic Bid and the Empire Club of Canada. He currently serves as a member of the Board and Audit Committee of TerraVest Industries.

== Politics ==
Rossi ran for Mayor of Toronto in the 2010 Toronto mayoral election. In 2011, he won the PC nomination for the riding of Eglinton—Lawrence and ran as a candidate for MPP in the 2011 Ontario general election. Rossi is a former national director of the federal Liberal Party of Canada, and also managed John Tory's campaign for Mayor of Toronto in the 2003 Toronto municipal election.

== Personal life ==
Rossi has completed numerous feats of endurance including walking the Camino de Santiago, which is a major Christian pilgrimage route, cycling the 1,900 km length of Yonge Street for charity, and kayaking over 500 km from Toronto to Ottawa.

In 2018, Rossi, acting as President of the Ontario Chamber of Commerce, was one of several "business leaders" who lobbied Ontario Premier Doug Ford to repeal Bill 148, legislation implemented by the previous provincial government. Among other things, that legislation guaranteed workers paid sick days, equal pay for part-time work, and a C$1/hour raise to a minimum wage of C$15/hour, to begin on January 1, 2019. Rossi publicly celebrated when Bill 148 was repealed, cancelling the planned increase of minimum wage. On December 31, 2018, the day before the cancelled minimum wage increase was to take place, Rossi tweeted photos of caviar, Veuve Clicquot champagne and pastries, with the statement "Celebrating New Year’s the 1-percenter way! Let them eat cake:-)." Rossi was roundly criticized by other Twitter users in the replies to his tweet, and has since deleted it and apologized, claiming the tweet was "satire."

== Electoral records ==
2011 Ontario general election
Party	Candidate	Votes	%	±%
Liberal	Mike Colle	20,752	54.15	+11.10
Progressive Conservative	Rocco Rossi	12,857	33.55	-3.97
New Democratic	Gerti Dervishi	3,763	9.82	-0.46
Green	Josh Rachlis	575	1.50	-5.70
Freedom	Michael Bone	152	0.40	
Independent	Jerry Green	146	0.38	
Independent	Sujith Reddy	79	0.21	
Total valid votes		38,324	100.00	
Total rejected, unmarked and declined ballots		185	0.48	
Turnout		38,496	51.81	
Eligible voters		74,309		
Liberal hold		Swing		+7.54
Source: Elections Ontario

2010 City of Toronto mayoral election
Candidate	Number of votes	% of popular vote
Rob Ford	383,501	47.114%
George Smitherman	289,832	35.607%
Joe Pantalone	95,482	11.730%
Rocco Rossi	5,012	0.616%
George Babula	3,273	0.402%
Rocco Achampong	2,805	0.345%
Abdullah-Baquie Ghazi	2,761	0.344%
Michael Alexander	2,470	0.304%
Vijay Sarma	2,264	0.277%
Sarah Thomson	1,883	0.232%
Jaime Castillo	1,874	0.231%
Dewitt Lee	1,699	0.209%
Douglas Campbell	1,428	0.176%
Kevin Clarke	1,411	0.173%
Joseph Pampena	1,319	0.162%
David Epstein	1,202	0.148%
Monowar Hossain	1,194	0.147%
Michael Flie	1,190	0.146%
Don Andrews	1,032	0.127%
Weizhen Tang	890	0.11%
Daniel Walker	804	0.098%
Keith Cole	801	0.098%
Michael Brausewetter	796	0.098%
Barry Goodhead	740	0.091%
Charlene Cottle	735	0.09%
Tibor Steinberger	733	0.09%
Christopher Ball	696	0.085%
James Di Fiore	655	0.08%
Diane Devenyi	629	0.078%
John Letonja	592	0.073%
Himy Syed	582	0.071%
Carmen Macklin	575	0.07%
Howard Gomberg	477	0.058%
David Vallance	444	0.055%
Mark State	438	0.054%
Phil Taylor	429	0.053%
Colin Magee	401	0.049%
Selwyn Firth	394	0.049%
Ratan Wadhwa	290	0.036%
Gerald Derome	251	0.031%
Total	813,984	100%
