= Curran Stikuts =

Canadian politician

Toronto City Councillor for Ward 13 Toronto Centre
- Incumbent
- Assumed office November 15, 2026
- Preceded by: Chris Moise

Personal details
- Party: Independent

Curran Stikuts is a Canadian politician who was elected to represent Ward 13 Toronto Centre on Toronto City Council in the 2026 Toronto municipal election.

A graduate of the social work program at Toronto Metropolitan University, and with a master's degree in Labour Studies from McMaster University, he was previously director of advocacy for The 519 community centre.

== Background and community work ==
Stikuts was born and raised in downtown Toronto. He spent ten years at The 519, working with youth and seniors and on recreational and educational programs before becoming director of advocacy and strategic communications.

== Political career ==
During the 2026 campaign, Stikuts advocated for additional housing and support services for people experiencing homelessness, mental illness and addiction. He also proposed stronger bylaw enforcement and protections for tenants. A renter himself, he said his building was slated for demolition.

Stikuts received the endorsement of Kristyn Wong-Tam, the ward's former councillor and its representative in the Legislative Assembly of Ontario. He defeated the incumbent Chris Moise by 2,187 votes, receiving 11,877 votes to Moise's 9,690. Daniel Tate finished third with 6,288 votes.

== Electoral record ==
Year	Position	Votes	Result	Main opponents
2026	Councillor, Ward 13 Toronto Centre	11,877	Elected	Chris Moise (9,690); Daniel Tate (6,288)

Source: TorontoToday.
