= Ward 13 Toronto Centre =

Municipal council district in Toronto, Ontario, Canada

- Constituency for the Toronto City Council
- Location of Ward 13 in Toronto
- City: Toronto
- Population: 103,805 (2016)

Current constituency
- Created: 2018
- Councillor: Curran Stikuts
- Community council: Toronto; East York
- Created from: Ward 21; Ward 22; Ward 15 (partial)
- First contested: 2018 election
- Last contested: 2026 election
- Ward profile: www.toronto.ca/ward-13-toronto-centre/

Ward 13 Toronto Centre is a municipal electoral division in Toronto, Ontario, Canada for the Toronto City Council. It was last contested in the 2026 municipal election, with Curran Stikuts elected councillor.

== Boundaries ==
On August 14, 2018, the Government of Ontario redrew municipal boundaries via the Better Local Government Act, 2018, S.O. 2018, c. 11 - Bill 5. This means that the 25 provincial electoral districts and the 25 municipal wards in Toronto currently share the same geographic borders.

Defined in legislation as:

Consisting of that part of the City of Toronto described as follows: commencing at the intersection of Sherbourne Street North with Bloor Street East; thence northerly along Sherbourne Street North to Rosedale Valley Road; thence generally easterly along said road and its production to the Don River; thence generally southerly along said river to the easterly production of Mill Street; thence westerly along said production and Mill Street to Parliament Street; thence westerly in a straight line to the intersection of The Esplanade with Berkeley Street; thence generally westerly along The Esplanade to Yonge Street; thence northerly along said street to Front Street West; thence generally southwesterly along said street to Bay Street; thence northerly along said street to Dundas Street West; thence easterly along said street to Yonge Street; thence northerly along said street to College Street; thence westerly along said street to Bay Street; thence northerly along said street to Charles Street West; thence easterly along said street to Yonge Street; thence southerly along said street to Charles Street East; thence easterly along said street to Mount Pleasant Road; thence generally northeasterly along said road to Bloor Street East; thence easterly along said street to the point of commencement.

== History ==
=== 2018 boundary adjustment ===
Toronto municipal ward boundaries were significantly modified in 2018 during the election campaign. Ultimately the new ward structure was used and later upheld by the Supreme Court of Canada in 2021.

=== 2018 municipal election ===
Ward 13 was first contested during the 2018 municipal election, with candidates including Ward 27 incumbent Kristyn Wong-Tam, Ward 28 incumbent Lucy Troisi and former Ontario deputy premier George Smitherman. Wong-Tam was ultimately elected with 51.26 per cent of the vote. Robin Buxton Potts, was appointed by council in June 2022 to serve the remainder of the term after Wong-Tam resigned to run in the 2022 provincial election.

=== 2022 municipal election ===
Chris Moise was elected in 2022.

== Geography ==
Ward 13 is part of the Toronto and East York community council.

Toronto Centre's approximate borders are Bay Street, College Street, Yonge Street and Dundas Street on the west, and The Esplanade on the south side. The Don River is the east boundary, and Rosedale Valley Road, Bloor Street, Mount Pleasant Road and Charles Street form the north border. The ward covers the heart of Downtown Toronto.

The ward contains areas such as Regent Park (Canada's first social housing development), St. James Town (a largely immigrant area and the most densely populated neighbourhood in Canada), Cabbagetown, Church and Wellesley (a historic LGBT neighbourhood), Toronto Metropolitan University, the Toronto Eaton Centre and part of the city's financial district (the east side of Bay Street).

== Councillors ==
Council term	Member		
Council term	Ward 6 Downtown East (City Council)	Ward 7 Regent Park & Cabbagetown (City Council)	Downtown (partial) (Metro Council)
1988–1991	Jack Layton	Barbara Hall	Dale Martin
1991–1994	Kyle Rae	Barbara Hall	Olivia Chow
1994–1997	Kyle Rae	Pam McConnell	Olivia Chow
	Ward 24 Downtown		Ward 25 Don River (partial)
1997–2000	Kyle Rae, Olivia Chow		Jack Layton, Pam McConnell
	Ward 27 Toronto Centre—Rosedale	Ward 28 Toronto Centre—Rosedale	n/a
2000–2003	Kyle Rae	Pam McConnell (Died July 2017)	n/a
2003–2006	Kyle Rae	Pam McConnell (Died July 2017)	n/a
2006–2010	Kyle Rae	Pam McConnell (Died July 2017)	n/a
2010–2014	Kristyn Wong-Tam	Pam McConnell (Died July 2017)	n/a
2014–2018	Kristyn Wong-Tam	Pam McConnell (Died July 2017)	n/a
2014–2018	Kristyn Wong-Tam	Lucy Troisi (appointed November 2017)	n/a
	Ward 13 Toronto Centre		n/a
2018–2022	Kristyn Wong-Tam (resigned May, 2022); Robin Buxton Potts (appointed June 2022)		n/a
2022–2026	Chris Moise		n/a
2026–2030	Curran Stikuts		n/a

== Election results ==
2026 Toronto municipal election

Candidate	Votes	%	minus
Curran Stikuts	11,877	28.62	–
Chris Moise (X)	9,690	23.35	25.13 ▼
Daniel Tate	6,288	15.15	–
Walied Khogali Ali	3,368	8.12	–
Nicki Ward	2,610	6.29	11.98 ▼
Joe Cadeau	2,431	5.86	–
Victoria Davis	2,127	5.13	–
Morgan Harris	1,057	2.55	–
Tom Cai	907	2.19	–
Norman MacLeod	681	1.64	–
Cleveland Marshall	462	1.11	0.74 ▼

2022 Toronto municipal election

Candidate	Vote	%
Chris Moise	10,457	48.48
Nicki Ward	3,940	18.27
Caroline Murphy	2,625	12.17
Colin Johnson	1,087	5.04
Dan Cortez Manalo	1,055	4.89
Miguel Avila	1,049	4.86
Ryan Lester	648	3.00
Cleveland Marshall	400	1.85
Dev Ramsumair	307	1.42

2018 Toronto municipal election, Ward 13 Toronto Centre
Candidate	Votes	Vote share
Kristyn Wong-Tam	15,706	50.26%
George Smitherman	4,734	15.15%
Lucy Troisi	2,698	8.63%
Khuram Aftab	1,794	5.74%
Walied Khogali Ali	1,408	4.51%
Ryan Lester	968	3.10%
Tim Gordanier	734	2.35%
Jon Callegher	713	2.28%
John Jeffery	530	1.70%
Catherina Perez	511	1.64%
Megann Willson	411	1.32%
Barbara Lavoie	176	0.56%
Jordan Stone	161	0.52%
Richard Forget	150	0.48%
Jonathan Heath	144	0.46%
Kyle McNally	138	0.44%
Darren Abramson	108	0.35%
Gladys Larbie	101	0.32%
Rob Wolvin	64	0.20%
Total	31,249	100%
Source: City of Toronto

== See also ==
- Municipal elections in Canada
- Municipal government of Toronto
- List of Toronto municipal elections
