= Women's Post =

- Women's Post, April/May 2010
- Editor: Sarah Lambert
- Categories: General Interest, Business, Lifestyle
- Frequency: Intermittently
- Publisher: Sarah Thomson
- First issue: January 2002 (as a newspaper); 2008 (as a magazine)
- Final issue: November 2019
- Company: Independent
- Country: Canada
- Based in: Toronto
- Language: English
- Website: www.womenspost.ca

The Women's Post was a Canadian English-language magazine, targeted at professional business women, based in Toronto and distributed nationally. The magazine was published every other month, had a circulation of 75,000 with a community of 300,000 in both print and online in 2010.

== History and profile ==
It was founded as the Women's News, a monthly tabloid format newspaper, in 2002 by Greg and Sarah Thomson and was renamed the Women's Post in 2003. In 2008, it relaunched in a glossy news magazine format which was published weekly. The first issue of the magazine was published on 1 August 2008. In 2009, the magazine's print schedule moved to six times a year with its online version moving from monthly to weekly publication. Since 2010, however, the print version has only been published quarterly.

Thomson moved to Barbados in 2018 to begin and run an ecotourism business.

The magazine's website was last updated in November 2019.

== Contributors ==
The Women's Post regular contributors included Michael Coren, Kirk Lapointe and Russell Wangersky.
