= Chris Moise =

Canadian politician

Toronto City Councillor for Ward 13 Toronto Centre
- In office November 15, 2022 – November 15, 2026
- Preceded by: Robin Buxton Potts
- Succeeded by: Curran Stikuts

Personal details
- Party: Independent
- Other political affiliations: New Democratic

Chris Moise is a Canadian former municipal politician who represented Ward 13 Toronto Centre on Toronto City Council from 2022 to 2026, having been elected in the 2022 Toronto municipal election.

== Political career ==
He previously ran as an Ontario New Democratic Party provincial candidate for Oak Ridges in the 1999 Ontario general election and for Brampton West—Mississauga in the 2003 Ontario general election, and as a federal New Democratic Party candidate for Brampton West in the 2004 Canadian federal election.

He ran for election to the Toronto District School Board in the 2014 Toronto municipal election, losing to incumbent trustee Sheila Ward; following Ward's death in office in 2016, he won the resulting by-election. In the 2018 Toronto municipal election, he initially registered to run for city council as a candidate in Ward 25; however, after the provincial government of Doug Ford passed legislation cutting the size of the city council in half by aligning ward boundaries with provincial and federal electoral district boundaries in the city, which would have pitted him against incumbent Ward 27 councillor Kristyn Wong-Tam in the new Ward 13, he withdrew from the race and ran for another term on the school board, winning re-election.

In the 2022 Toronto municipal election, Moise was elected to represent Ward 13, Toronto Centre, on city council, receiving 10,457 votes (48.5%). Nicki Ward finished second with 3,940 votes (18.3%).

In December 2023, Moise tabled a motion that ultimately renamed Yonge-Dundas Square to Sankofa Square, a Ghanaian term from the Akan people, referring to the act of reflecting on and reclaiming teachings from the past.

In April 2025, Moise brought a motion to City Council that would make it more difficult for non-profit organizations to obtain temporary liquor licenses for one-off events. The text of the motion notes that it is targeted at suppressing "rave parties". The motion inspired a swift backlash and large petition from the Toronto electronic music community. Moise withdrew the motion on 23 April 2025.

On March 21, 2026, Moise was found by the Toronto Integrity Commissioner to have violated the code of conduct for city councillors during an incident that occurred on January 16, 2025, in which he dismissed a constituent, Daniel Tate, as having “a white supremacy view” in response to a question about what the councillor planned to rename in 2025.

On October 26, 2026, Moise lost his re-election bid to Curran Stikuts, who received 11,877 votes (28.6%); Moise received 9,690 votes (23.4%), and Daniel Tate finished third with 6,288 votes (15.2%). His council term ended on November 15, 2026.

== Personal life ==
Moise is a Black Canadian, and openly gay.

== Electoral history ==
2026 Toronto municipal election, Ward 13 Toronto Centre
Candidate	Votes	%	±%
Curran Stikuts	11,877	28.62	–
Chris Moise (X)	9,690	23.35	−25.13
Daniel Tate	6,288	15.15	–
Walied Khogali Ali	3,368	8.12	–
Nicki Ward	2,610	6.29	−11.98
Joe Cadeau	2,431	5.86	–
Victoria Davis	2,127	5.13	–
Morgan Harris	1,057	2.55	–
Tom Cai	907	2.19	–
Norman MacLeod	681	1.64	–
Cleveland Marshall	462	1.11	−0.74
Source: City of Toronto.

2022 Toronto municipal election, Ward 13 Toronto Centre
Candidate	Votes	%
Chris Moise	10,457	48.48
Nicki Ward	3,940	18.27
Caroline Murphy	2,625	12.17
Colin Johnson	1,087	5.04
Dan Cortez Manalo	1,055	4.89
Miguel Avila	1,049	4.86
Ryan Lester	648	3.00
Cleveland Marshall	400	1.85
Dev Ramsumair	307	1.42
Source: City of Toronto.

2018 Toronto District School Board trustee election, Ward 10
Candidate	Votes
Chris Moise (X)	18,244
Olivia Labonté	5,575
David Oliver	3,746
Aaron MacGregor	3,360
Susan Gapka	2,595
Jooheon Lee	2,310
Kate Frischkorn	2,104
Fos Ashkir	1,960
Arnella Renda Tarantino	1,889
Ted Crysler	1,474
Mahbubul Alam	1,318
Alamgir Muhammad	1,313
Baquie Ghazi	510
Source: City of Toronto.

2016 Toronto District School Board by-election, Ward 14 Toronto Centre—Rosedale
Candidate	Votes
Chris Moise	2,177
Li Koo	1,677
Mahbubul Alam	575
Krista Taylor	462
Bob Phillips	252
Adam Faux	242
Erica Kelly	175
Rutul Sharma	150
Kuga Kasilingam	114
Michael Guenther	96
Herb Love	82
Leeann Dusome	48
Source: City of Toronto.

2014 Toronto District School Board trustee election, Ward 14 Toronto Centre—Rosedale
Candidate	Votes	%
Sheila Ward (X)	17,543	41.46
Chris Moise	15,220	35.97
Murphy Browne	6,576	15.54
Michael Guenther	2,974	7.03
Source: Campaign for Public Education.

2004 Canadian federal election: Brampton West
Party	Candidate	Votes	%
Liberal	Colleen Beaumier	21,254	45.4
Conservative	Tony Clement	18,768	40.0
New Democratic	Chris Moise	4,920	10.5
Green	Sanjeev Goel	1,603	3.4
Independent	Tom Bose	371	0.8
Total valid votes		46,916	100.0

2003 Ontario general election: Brampton West—Mississauga
Party	Candidate	Votes	%	±%	Expenditures
Liberal	Vic Dhillon	28,926	46.18	+8.95	$84,782.33
Progressive Conservative	Tony Clement	26,414	42.17	–13.70	$108,691.97
New Democratic	Chris Moise	5,103	8.15	+1.81	$7,336.30
Family Coalition	Paul Micelli	1,122	1.79	–	no report filed
Green	Paul Simas	811	1.29	–	$1,000.06
Freedom	John G. Purdy	266	0.42	–	$0.00
Total valid votes		62,642	99.12		
Total rejected, unmarked and declined ballots		555	0.88	–0.23	
Turnout		63,197	50.84	–0.40	
Eligible voters		124,317			
Liberal gain from Progressive Conservative		Swing		+11.32	
Source: Elections Ontario

1999 Ontario general election: Oak Ridges
Party	Candidate	Votes	%
Progressive Conservative	Frank Klees	30,432	59.99
Liberal	Vito Spatafora	17,427	34.35
New Democratic	Chris Moise	1,957	3.86
Green	Steven Haylestrom	914	1.80
Total valid votes		50,730	99.31
Total rejected, unmarked and declined ballots		354	0.69
Turnout		51,084	56.56
Eligible voters		90,319	
Progressive Conservative pickup new district.			
Source: Elections Ontario
