= Kyle Rae =

Canadian politician

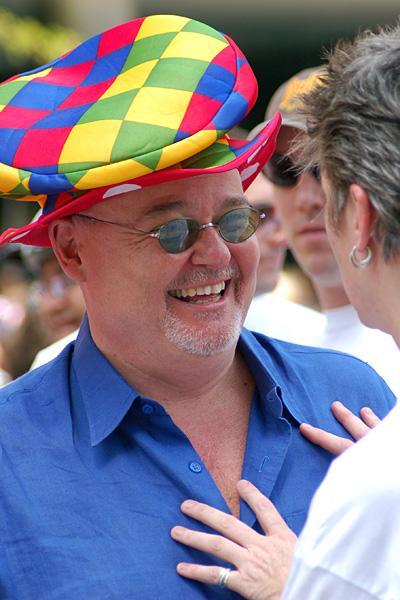
- Rae in 2006

Toronto City Councillor
- In office 1997–2010
- Preceded by: Jack Layton
- Succeeded by: Kristyn Wong-Tam
- Constituency: Ward 6 (1991–1997); Ward 27 (1997–2010)

Personal details
- Born: January 23, 1954 (age 72)
- Spouse: Mark Reid (m. 2003)
- Education: Brock University[University of Birmingham][University of Toronto]
- Occupation: Consultant

Kyle Rae (born January 23, 1954) is a Canadian consultant and former politician. Rae was a member of Toronto City Council from 1991 to 2010, representing Ward 6 in the old city from 1991 to 1997 and Ward 27 Toronto Centre-Rosedale following the municipal amalgamation of Toronto in 1997.

== Politics ==
Rae was first elected to Toronto city council in 1991 as a left-leaning councillor filling the seat vacated by Jack Layton (who was running for mayor at the time). He campaigned as an openly gay candidate and beat his closest rival by 1,003 votes, becoming the city's first openly gay councillor. During his first term, as Chair of the City's Personnel Committee he attempted, with Mayor June Rowlands' support, to introduce affirmative action in the city's fire department. The motion was defeated.

A longtime member of the Ontario New Democratic Party, he left the party because of the failure of NDP Premier Bob Rae's government (who is not related to Kyle Rae) to pass long-promised reforms on gay rights issues. Rae led a local boycott of the NDP in the 1993 by-election in the riding of St. George—St. David (now Toronto Centre) to highlight his position. In recent years, Rae supported John Sewell's independent candidacy in the 1999 provincial election and federal Liberal Bill Graham. He supported Barbara Hall against David Miller in the 2003 mayoralty election. Because of his long running and historic criticism of the NDP's legislative failure on gay rights issues, Rae surprised many when he endorsed former Premier Rae when the latter successfully contested the Toronto Centre federal by-election on March 17, 2008 as the Liberal Party candidate. Kyle said of Bob, "He has a unique set of skills and experience, and I hope he wins .... His candidacy has my full support."

In 2000, Rae and fellow councillor David Soknacki were both acclaimed in their ridings.

In 2002, he was sued for defamation by members of the Toronto Police Service, including future TPS chief Myron Demkiw, after he sharply criticized a 2000 raid on the Toronto Women's Bathhouse, a lesbian bathhouse event. His calling the police "rogue cops" and "goons" and the operation a "panty raid" was criticized, and the officers alleged what was only a standard liquor inspection hurt their careers and reputations. A jury eventually decided that the seven officers were defamed and ordered Rae to pay $170,000. The settlement money was paid by the city from a fund that protects councillors from having to pay lawsuits from personal funds.

With the legalization of same-sex marriage in 2003, Rae married Mark Reid, his partner since 1994.

In May 2007, Rae renewed his call for a bylaw to further protect historic buildings. The proposed bylaw would give the City of Toronto the power to charge building owners who let historic buildings fall into disrepair. It would also give the city the power to perform emergency repairs in certain cases, applying the bill to the owner's taxes. Rae's call came after the Walnut Hall, a historic Georgian Rowhouse, collapsed after decades of neglect. The building's various owners sought to tear it down and were prevented because of its historical value.

On December 11, 2009, Rae announced that he would not run in the November 2010 municipal election. He endorsed Ken Chan, a former police officer and aide to London Mayor Boris Johnson in the Ward 27 council race and Toronto mayoral candidate George Smitherman. Chan was defeated by Kristyn Wong-Tam in the municipal election.

In June 2010, Rae held a retirement party at the Rosewater Club and billed the $12,000 cost to his office budget. Mayoral candidate Rob Ford and fellow councillors criticized Rae for this expense and said that Rae should return the money. Council voted down a request to have Rae return the money. Rae claimed that unspent campaign funds he was forced to turn over the city more than covered the cost, but critics pointed out that the campaign money was not his to spend. This example was used by Ford as an example of the "Gravy Train" at City Hall.

== After politics ==
Since retirement, Rae has worked as a consultant for the development industry clearing zoning and other regulatory and statutory hurdles on behalf of builders. In 2012, ONEX chairman Gerry Schwartz hired Rae to lobby city councillors against a downtown casino, a development that the city's executive committee has been considering as a tool of economic development. He also teaches introductory politics and local government part-time at Toronto Metropolitan University (formerly Ryerson University).
