= Daniel Tate =

Canadian author and municipal political activist

- Tate in 2026
- Born: 1980 (age 45–46)
- Education: York University
- Occupations: Author; Music historian; Political activist
- Known for: The Flyer Vault; IntegrityTO

Daniel Tate (born 1980) is a Canadian author, music historian and municipal political activist in Toronto. He founded IntegrityTO, a group involved in Toronto municipal politics, and serves as its executive director.

Tate ran for Toronto City Council in Ward 13 Toronto Centre in the 2026 Toronto municipal election, finishing third behind Curran Stikuts and incumbent councillor Chris Moise.

== IntegrityTO ==
Tate founded IntegrityTO following Toronto City Council's 2023 decision to rename Yonge–Dundas Square to Sankofa Square. He opposed the renaming and subsequently campaigned against other municipal policies, including harm reduction measures and dedicated bus lanes.

IntegrityTO attracted thousands of followers on social media, where it posted criticism of Toronto City Council and Mayor Olivia Chow. Its posts included photographs and videos of homelessness, public drug use and conditions in public spaces. Tate said the material documented problems that city officials had failed to address. Critics accused the group of dehumanizing vulnerable people.

In September 2026, Toronto Life described IntegrityTO as "a fringe group that bills itself as non-partisan but sits squarely on the right". Unlike Progress Toronto and ABC Toronto, which relied on volunteer networks and political organizing, IntegrityTO focused primarily on social media. At the time, its Instagram account had approximately 68,000 followers, compared with 25,000 for Progress Toronto and 8,000 for ABC Toronto.

IntegrityTO's videos focused on crime, homelessness and public drug use. One video showing an apparent shoplifting incident at an LCBO store received 355,000 views, while another showing a confrontation involving a person lying on the street received nearly 500,000 views. Tate also frequently criticized councillor Chris Moise, whom he challenged in the 2026 Toronto municipal election.

In addition to Tate's own candidacy, during the 2026 Toronto municipal election, IntegrityTO endorsed three city council candidates: Marco Martins in Ward 9 Davenport, Daniel Di Giorgio in Ward 5 York South–Weston, and Caryma Sa'd in Ward 14 Toronto–Danforth. All three were defeated. Martins finished second with 27.44% of the vote, losing to incumbent Alejandra Bravo. Di Giorgio also finished second, receiving 28.63% of the vote in a race won by Chiara Padovani, while Sa'd placed sixth with 2.14% in a contest won by Sara Ehrhardt.

=== Use of artificial intelligence ===
IntegrityTO has published political images and videos created using generative artificial intelligence. Its use of the technology drew criticism over the depiction of homelessness, drug use and municipal policies.

In November 2025, IntegrityTO posted an AI-generated video opposing proposed changes to Toronto's neighbourhood retail regulations. The video depicted people loitering outside a 7-Eleven on a residential street surrounded by garbage. It received more than 90,000 views. Versions posted on X and Instagram were not labelled as AI-generated.

Tate defended the videos, comparing them to political cartoons and saying that their artificial appearance was apparent to viewers.

== Dispute with Chris Moise ==
On January 16, 2025, Tate attended a budget town hall in Toronto Centre. As Councillor Chris Moise was leaving the meeting, Tate questioned him about the renaming of Yonge–Dundas Square. Tate recorded the exchange and subsequently published the video.

During the exchange, Moise told Tate that he believed Tate had a "white supremacy view". Tate asked whether Moise was calling him a white supremacist and demanded an apology. Moise accused Tate of harassing him and his staff and refused to apologize.

Tate filed a complaint with Toronto's Integrity Commissioner several days later. In March 2026, the commissioner found that Moise had violated Article 14 of the city's Code of Conduct by addressing a member of the public in a derogatory manner while acting in his official capacity. The commissioner found that Moise's remarks were directed at an identifiable individual and could damage that person's reputation.

The commissioner did not recommend a penalty, citing the circumstances of the encounter, including Tate's questioning of Moise as the councillor attempted to leave and Tate's subsequent publication of the recording. IntegrityTO called on council to impose a penalty despite the recommendation.

Moise disputed the finding and said he had "no regrets" about his remarks. He said he would continue speaking out against racism, bigotry and white nationalism.

Moise alleged that Tate disproportionately targeted racialized public officials. Tate denied holding racist views.

In May 2026, Toronto City Council agreed to reimburse Moise for half of his legal expenses arising from the Integrity Commissioner's investigation. Moise had requested reimbursement for approximately $28,000 in legal fees.

In March 2026, the City of Toronto sent IntegrityTO a cease-and-desist letter concerning its sale of T-shirts bearing the Yonge–Dundas Square logo.

== 2026 municipal election ==
On July 22, 2026, Tate announced that he would run against incumbent councillor Chris Moise in Ward 13, Toronto Centre, in the 2026 Toronto municipal election.

Tate's campaign platform called for increased police patrols on public transit, stricter enforcement of laws governing public spaces, improved waste collection and the expansion of addiction treatment and rehabilitation services. He opposed the distribution of drug paraphernalia as a harm-reduction measure and supported reversing the renaming of Yonge–Dundas Square.

His proposals for municipal administration included audits of city departments, merit-based hiring, reviewing spending on city services and reducing regulatory requirements affecting small businesses. He also called for greater accountability within Toronto Community Housing and protections against bad-faith evictions.

Tate supported permitting additional housing density provided that infrastructure and services were expanded to accommodate growth. He favoured reducing development charges and approval times for new housing, concentrating development along major streets and near rapid transit, and increasing investment in rapid-transit lines. He opposed congestion charges and supported reviewing cycling lanes that he believed impeded traffic.

Tate also supported increasing police staffing, requiring people living in encampments to leave public parks when suitable indoor accommodation was available, and publishing budgets and performance reports for major city projects. On municipal finances, he favoured limiting growth in residential property-tax revenue to below inflation and reviewing city services and expenditures.

In the October 26 election, Tate finished third with 6,288 votes (15.1%), behind winner Curran Stikuts and incumbent Chris Moise.

2026 Toronto municipal election, Ward 13 Toronto Centre
Candidate	Votes	%
Curran Stikuts	11,877	28.62
Chris Moise (X)	9,690	23.35
Daniel Tate	6,288	15.15
Walied Khogali Ali	3,368	8.12
Nicki Ward	2,610	6.29
Joe Cadeau	2,431	5.86
Victoria Davis	2,127	5.13
Morgan Harris	1,057	2.55
Tom Cai	907	2.19
Norman MacLeod	681	1.64
Cleveland Marshall	462	1.11
Source: City of Toronto

== The Flyer Vault ==
Tate worked on the street team for Toronto hip-hop and R&B concert promoter REMG while studying political science at York University. He later became the company's director of promotions.

Tate began collecting concert flyers and promotional material while working in the music industry. He kept the collection at his parents' home and launched The Flyer Vault, an Instagram account displaying the material, in 2015. He later expanded the collection through research at the City of Toronto Archives, the Toronto Reference Library and newspaper archives.

By 2019, Tate had collected approximately 8,000 images. He collaborated with York University musicologist Rob Bowman on the book The Flyer Vault: 150 Years of Toronto Concert History, published by Dundurn Press in October 2019. The book featured 170 items from the collection and included a foreword by Geddy Lee of Rush.

In 2024, Tate published Stories of the Stage: 25 Years of Concert History at Scotiabank Arena, which documents the venue's concert history through photographs, memorabilia and accounts from performers such as the Tragically Hip, Avril Lavigne, and Feist, promoters, and fans.
