= Robin Buxton Potts =

Canadian politician

Toronto City Councillor for Ward 13 Toronto Centre
- In office June 1, 2022 – November 15, 2022
- Preceded by: Kristyn Wong-Tam
- Succeeded by: Chris Moise

Personal details
- Born: Toronto, Ontario
- Party: Nonpartisan (municipal)
- Occupation: politician
- Website: https://www.voterbp.ca/

Robin Buxton Potts is a Canadian politician who sat on Toronto City Council in 2022. She was appointed by council to represent Ward 13 Toronto Centre following the resignation of Kristyn Wong-Tam.

== Background ==
Buxton Potts comes from a public relations background. She began her career in municipal government working as a community relations and strategic advisor in the offices of councillors Adam Vaughan, Ceta Ramkhalawansingh and Kristyn Wong-Tam, before becoming chief of staff in Wong-Tam's office.

== Political career ==
In 2022, Wong-Tam resigned to run for the New Democratic Party (NDP) in the 2022 provincial election. Following her departure, Buxton Potts was appointed by council on June 1, 2022, to serve the remainder of the Wong-Tam's term as Ward 13 councillor. Buxton Potts stated she intended to act as a "caretaker" for the role and would not seek election in Ward 13. During her term as city councillor for Ward 13, Buxton Potts spoke openly about her lived experiences with addiction and campaigned for improved access to addictions treatment.

=== 2022 municipal election ===
Shortly after being appointed as interim councillor in Ward 13, Buxton Potts announced she would be running in the 2022 Toronto municipal election in the neighbouring district, Ward 11 University—Rosedale, which was an open seat. She was defeated, coming in third place with 8.9% of the vote, behind winning candidate Dianne Saxe and runner-up Norm Di Pasquale.

Following the 2022 election, Buxton Potts was hired by Councillor Shelley Carroll as Senior Strategic Advisor.
