= Kristyn Wong-Tam =

Canadian politician

Kristyn Wong-Tam MPP
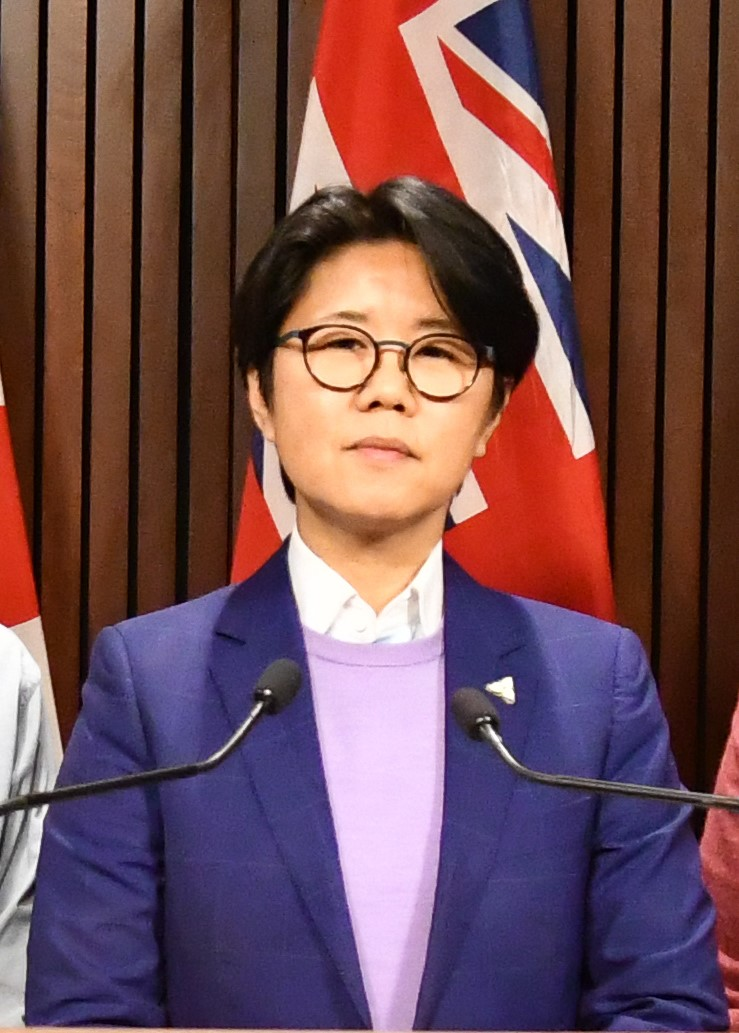
- Wong-Tam in 2023

Member of the Ontario Provincial Parliament for Toronto Centre
- Incumbent
- Assumed office June 2, 2022
- Preceded by: Suze Morrison

Toronto City Councillor for Ward 13 Toronto Centre
- In office December 1, 2018 – May 4, 2022
- Preceded by: Ward created
- Succeeded by: Robin Buxton Potts

Toronto City Councillor for Ward 27 Toronto Centre-Rosedale
- In office December 1, 2010 – November 30, 2018
- Preceded by: Kyle Rae
- Succeeded by: Ward dissolved

Critic roles
- 2022–present: Opposition Critic for 2SLGBTQ+ Issues
- 2022–present: Opposition Critic for Attorney General
- 2023–present: Opposition Critic for Small Business

Personal details
- Born: 1971 (age 54–55) British Hong Kong
- Party: Ontario New Democratic
- Other political affiliations: Independent (municipal)
- Spouse: Farrah Khan
- Occupation: Businessperson; politician
- Website: Campaign website Constituency website

Chinese name
- Traditional Chinese: 黃慧文
- Simplified Chinese: 黄慧文
Transcriptions
Standard Mandarin
- Hanyu Pinyin: Huáng Huìwén
- Wade–Giles: Huang^{2} Hui^{4}-wen^{2}
Yue: Cantonese
- Jyutping: Wong^{4} Wai^{6}-man^{4}

Kristyn Wong-Tam (Chinese: 黃慧文; born c. 1971) is a Canadian politician who is the member of Provincial Parliament (MPP) for Toronto Centre. A member of the Ontario New Democratic Party (NDP), Wong-Tam was elected to the Legislative Assembly of Ontario in the 2022 provincial election. Previously, Wong-Tam served on Toronto City Council, representing Ward 27 Toronto Centre-Rosedale from 2010 to 2018 and Ward 13 Toronto Centre from 2018 to 2022. Wong-Tam identifies as non-binary and uses they/them pronouns.

== Early life and work ==
Born in Hong Kong and raised in a Buddhist family, Wong-Tam immigrated to Toronto with their family in 1975. They grew up in the Regent Park neighbourhood of Toronto, with their family settling there first before moving to the suburbs. A real estate agent and business owner, Wong-Tam is the former owner of a Timothy's franchise in Toronto's Church and Wellesley Village, and the owner of the KWT (formerly the XEXE) contemporary art gallery at Bathurst and Richmond Street West.

=== Activism ===
Wong-Tam came out as a lesbian in high school, at the age of 16 and has been an activist for both LGBTQ and Asian Canadian community issues, serving on the Chinese Canadian National Council and helping to found Asian Canadians For Equal Marriage and the Church and Wellesley Village's business improvement area. In 2011, Wong-Tam cooperated with Toronto's Lesbian Gay Bi Trans Youth Line to create an award, named in memory of Toronto artist Will Munro, to honour LGBT youth involved in community arts projects in Ontario.

Prior to the 2010 Toronto municipal election, it emerged that Wong-Tam had provided support for the political advocacy group Queers Against Israeli Apartheid (QuAIA). In an interview with the Toronto Sun newspaper, Wong-Tam said that they lent their credit card to register the group's website because no one in the group owned a credit card. Wong-Tam "listed their home address in the registration but gave the contact number as their Coldwell Banker real estate office on Yonge St." Wong-Tam was the registered owner of the site until August 31, 2010.

== Political career ==
=== Rookie councillor (2010–14) ===
In the 2010 election, Wong-Tam ran in Ward 27 to replace Kyle Rae who had chosen to retire, and defeated opponent Ken Chan by 400 plus votes in the heated race. Wong-Tam was endorsed by the Toronto and York Labour Council, neighbouring councillor Adam Vaughan, street nurse Cathy Crowe and author Michele Landsberg.

In a post-election interview with the Toronto Sun, Wong-Tam said that they were "really looking forward to working with the Mayor" and that they supported Mayor Rob Ford's campaign pledge to scrap the personal vehicle tax and the land transfer tax. Wong-Tam also said that they did not renew their New Democratic Party membership, saying: "I think all (council) rookies are saying the same thing – they don't want to be pigeon-holed."

=== Second term (2014–18) ===
Wong-Tam was re-elected in Ward 27 in 2014. They supported a potential Toronto bid for Expo 2025, which was voted down by council in 2016.

=== Third term (2018–22) ===
In the lead up to the 2018 Toronto municipal election, City Council approved a redrawing of municipal ward boundaries, increasing its size from 44, after an independent consultant recommended the city adopt a 47 ward system. However, the Ontario government under Progressive Conservative Premier Doug Ford amended the Municipal Elections Act, forcing the City of Toronto to cut the number of wards from 47 to 25. There was swift reaction regarding this move from various council members, including Wong-Tam, who called the move "extremely anti-democratic" and described it "as a takeover of Toronto." Wong-Tam said in an interview "This greater concentration of power does not give and deliver better government", and "He [Ford] will speak in populist platitudes about saving taxpayer dollars, but it's going to come at the cost of the erosion of the democratic process."

In June 2020 they co-sponsored an unsuccessful city council motion to defund the Toronto police force by 10% (about $122 million), and use the money for community resources. Mike McCormack, president of the Toronto Police Association, stated such a cut would lead at least 500 police officers losing their jobs.

In July 2021 they proposed a motion to make it illegal for residents to feed pigeons in both public and private spaces.

In November 2021, after authoring a controversial column in the Toronto Sun in which they falsely claimed that vaccinated people can transmit COVID-19 “just as easily as those who are unvaccinated,” they apologized for their mistake and said that they would not pursue another term as vice-chair of the Toronto Public Health when their current one expired the following month.

=== Member of the Ontario Provincial Parliament (2022–present) ===
On April 8, 2022, Wong-Tam and Ontario NDP leader Andrea Horwath announced that Wong-Tam would be the party's candidate in Toronto Centre in the June 2 election. Wong-Tam resigned from their council seat effective May 4. They won the Toronto Centre seat by more than 2,000 votes.

Wong-Tam was named the Official Opposition critic for the Attorney General and 2SLGBTQ+ Issues on July 13, 2022. They were made critic for small business on March 29, 2023.

In 2023, Wong-Tam sought greater legal protection for drag performers in Ontario. They introduced a private member's bill known as the "Bill 94, Keeping 2SLGBTQI+ Communities Safe Act, 2023" in April to allow the attorney general of Ontario to temporarily designate addresses, such as drag venues, as community safety zones – similar to zones which exist around abortion sites. Anti-2SLGBTQ+ harassment, intimidation or hate speech within 100 metres of a designated zone would be subject to a fine up to $25,000. The bill stalled after its first reading and was never voted on or enacted into law.

Wong-Tam endorsed Alberta MP Heather McPherson in the 2026 New Democratic Party leadership election. They declined to run in Ward 13 Toronto Centre in the 2026 Toronto municipal election, endorsing Curran Stikuts; Wong-Tam endorsed incumbent councillor Chris Moise in 2022.

== Election results ==
2025 Ontario general election: Toronto Centre
Party	Candidate	Votes	%	±%	Expenditures
New Democratic	Kristyn Wong-Tam	17,415	44.50	+0.73	$121,768
Liberal	Holly Rasky	14,152	36.16	–0.55	$40,537
Progressive Conservative	Ruth Farkas	5,692	14.54	+2.38	$953
Green	Andrew Massey	1,054	2.69	–2.42	$1,543
Progress	Sana Ahmad	381	0.97	N/A	$0
New Blue	Steve Hoehlmann	290	0.74	–0.36	$0
Independent	Cory Deville	151	0.39	N/A	$0
Total valid votes/expense limit		39,137	99.22	–0.14	$149,118
Total rejected, unmarked, and declined ballots		309	0.78	+0.14	
Turnout		39,446	43.61	+3.79	
Eligible voters		90,454			
New Democratic hold		Swing		+0.64	
Source: Elections Ontario

2022 Ontario general election: Toronto Centre
Party	Candidate	Votes	%	±%	Expenditures
New Democratic	Kristyn Wong-Tam	15,285	43.77	−9.89	$117,371
Liberal	David Morris	12,820	36.71	+9.56	$86,950
Progressive Conservative	Jess Goddard	4,245	12.16	−1.96	$25,855
Green	Nicki Ward	1,784	5.11	+1.99	$13,592
New Blue	Steve Hoehlmann	385	1.10		$0
Communist	Ivan Byard	166	0.48		$0
None of the Above	Ron Shaw	131	0.38		$326
Stop the New Sex-Ed Agenda	Jennifer Snell	105	0.30	+0.07	$0
Total valid votes/expense limit		34,921	99.36	+0.27	$123,610
Total rejected, unmarked, and declined ballots		224	0.64	−0.27	
Turnout		35,145	39.82	−14.48	
Eligible voters		88,307			
New Democratic hold		Swing		−9.72	
Source(s): "Summary of Valid Votes Cast for Each Candidate" (PDF). Elections Ontario. 2022. Archived from the original on 2023-05-18.; "Statistical Summary by Electoral District" (PDF). Elections Ontario. 2022. Archived from the original on 2023-05-21.

2018 Toronto municipal election, Ward 13 Toronto Centre
Candidate	Votes	Vote share
Kristyn Wong-Tam	15,706	50.26%
George Smitherman	4,734	15.15%
Lucy Troisi	2,698	8.63%
Khuram Aftab	1,794	5.74%
Walied Khogali Ali	1,408	4.51%
Ryan Lester	968	3.10%
Tim Gordanier	734	2.35%
Jon Callegher	713	2.28%
John Jeffery	530	1.70%
Catherina Perez	511	1.64%
Megann Willson	411	1.32%
Barbara Lavoie	176	0.56%
Jordan Stone	161	0.52%
Richard Forget	150	0.48%
Jonathan Heath	144	0.46%
Kyle McNally	138	0.44%
Darren Abramson	108	0.35%
Gladys Larbie	101	0.32%
Rob Wolvin	64	0.20%
Total	31,249	100%
Source: City of Toronto

2014 Toronto election, Ward 27
Candidate	Votes	%
Kristyn Wong-Tam	19,682	62.49%
Megan McIver	5,340	16.96%
Benjamin Dichter	1,528	4.85%
Jordan Stone	1,270	4.03%
David Byford	839	2.66%
Susan Humfryes	794	2.52%
Robin Lawrance	704	2.24%
Kamal Ahmed	609	1.93%
Alain DAmours	378	1.20%
Rob Wolvin	351	1.11%
Total	31,495	100%

2010 Toronto election, Ward 27
Candidate	Votes	%
Kristyn Wong-Tam	7,527	28.277%
Ken Chan	7,065	26.541%
Chris Tindal	3,447	12.949%
Simon Wookey	2,128	7.994%
Joel Dick	1,667	6.262%
Robert Meynell	1,223	4.594%
Enza Anderson	1,127	4.234%
Ella Rebanks	838	3.148%
Ben Bergen	380	1.428%
Susan Gapka	367	1.379%
Gary Leroux	283	1.063%
Paul Spence	243	0.913%
Jonas Jemstone	142	0.533%
Ram Narula	108	0.406%
Perry Missal	74	0.278%
Total	26,619	100%
