= Lucy Troisi =

Canadian politician

Toronto City Councillor for Ward 28 Toronto Centre-Rosedale
- In office November 2, 2017 – December 1, 2018
- Preceded by: Pam McConnell
- Succeeded by: Ward dissolved

Personal details
- Party: Independent

Lucy Troisi (/ˈtrɔɪsi/ TROY-see, Italian: [troˈiːzi]) is a former Canadian politician and public servant who was appointed to represent Ward 28 Toronto Centre-Rosedale on Toronto City Council on November 2, 2017 to December 1, 2018.

== Background ==
Troisi grew up in Regent Park and lives in Cabbagetown. At the time of her appointment to council, Troisi was executive director of the Cabbagetown Youth Centre. She was a manager with the Toronto Parks Forestry & Recreation Division from 1996 to 2005.

== Toronto City Council ==
Ward 28 became vacant following the death of Councillor Pam McConnell, and council voted to fill appoint a new councillor for the remaining year of the term. Troisi won the appointment on the second ballot, in a council vote that split along ideological lines between conservative (primarily suburban) councillors who favoured Troisi, and progressive (primarily 'downtown') councillors who favoured activist and McConnell staffer Michael Creek. She committed to continuing the mandate McConnell was elected on.

=== 2018 election ===
Troisi initially did not intend to contest 2018 Toronto municipal election, however, after the decision by the provincial government to reduce the number of wards, she later changed her mind and ran in Ward 13 Toronto Centre against fellow councillor Kristyn Wong-Tam, and former Ontario deputy premier George Smitherman. She placed third.

== Electoral record ==
2018 Toronto municipal election, Ward 13 Toronto Centre
Candidate	Votes	Vote share
Kristyn Wong-Tam	15,706	50.26%
George Smitherman	4,734	15.15%
Lucy Troisi	2,698	8.63%
Khuram Aftab	1,794	5.74%
Walied Khogali Ali	1,408	4.51%
Ryan Lester	968	3.10%
Tim Gordanier	734	2.35%
Jon Callegher	713	2.28%
John Jeffery	530	1.70%
Catherina Perez	511	1.64%
Megann Willson	411	1.32%
Barbara Lavoie	176	0.56%
Jordan Stone	161	0.52%
Richard Forget	150	0.48%
Jonathan Heath	144	0.46%
Kyle McNally	138	0.44%
Darren Abramson	108	0.35%
Gladys Larbie	101	0.32%
Rob Wolvin	64	0.20%
Total	31,249	100%
Source: City of Toronto
