= George Smitherman =

Canadian politician

The Honourable George Smitherman ECO
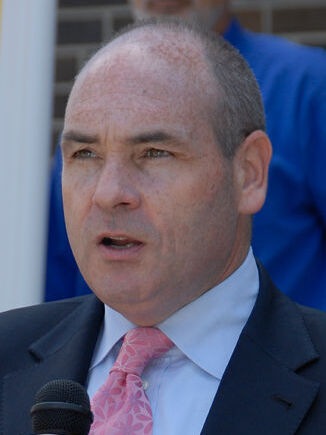
- Smitherman in 2007

8th Deputy Premier of Ontario
- In office September 21, 2006 – September 8, 2009
- Premier: Dalton McGuinty
- Preceded by: Elizabeth Witmer (2003)
- Succeeded by: Dwight Duncan (2011)

Member of the Ontario Provincial Parliament for Toronto Centre Toronto Centre—Rosedale (1999-2007)
- In office June 3, 1999 – January 4, 2010
- Preceded by: Al Leach
- Succeeded by: Glen Murray

Personal details
- Born: February 12, 1964 (age 62) Weston, Ontario, Canada
- Party: Ontario Liberal
- Spouse: Christopher Peloso (m. 2007; died 2013)
- Children: 2
- Occupation: Consultant

George Smitherman ECO (born February 12, 1964) is a former Canadian politician and broadcaster. He represented the provincial riding of Toronto Centre in the Legislative Assembly of Ontario from 1999 to 2010, when he resigned to contest the mayoralty of Toronto in the 2010 municipal election. Smitherman was the first openly gay member of Provincial Parliament (MPP) elected in Ontario, and the province's first openly gay cabinet minister.

Smitherman was a candidate in the 2018 municipal election running for Toronto City Council in Ward 13 Toronto Centre which included much of the provincial riding he represented as an MPP. He received 15% of the vote, failing to unseat incumbent Kristyn Wong-Tam who received 50%.

Since March 2020 he has been president and CEO of the Cannabis Council of Canada.

== Background ==
Smitherman was born at Humber Memorial Hospital (now Humber River Regional Hospital Church site) in Weston, Ontario and spent much of his early years in Etobicoke (he briefly lived in East York, Ontario). He is the son of Irene Margaret (Wood) and Arthur Smitherman, and one of four children. Smitherman spent much time working with his father's business, Smitty's Haulage (later Sure-Way Transport).

Smitherman admitted a five-year addiction to an illegal drug before running for political office. Smitherman has not indicated the specific drugs he was addicted to during this time, except to say that they were part of the "Toronto party scene", and that "the drugs were not injected". He is estranged from his older brother, saying they didn't fall out but just drifted apart. Arthur, who ran for city council from Ward 8, endorsed Rob Ford for mayor.

On August 5, 2007, Smitherman married his partner, Christopher Peloso, near Elliot Lake, Ontario. Peloso was a manager with Lindt & Sprüngli. On September 26, 2009, the Toronto Star reported that Smitherman and Peloso had been approved as adoptive parents by the Toronto Children's Aid Society. They adopted two children named Michael and Kayla. Peloso also had a daughter from a previous relationship. Peloso, who was reportedly suffering from clinical depression, was found dead after going missing in December 2013.

== Early politics ==
Smitherman was active in politics at Burnhamthorpe Collegiate Institute, where he was the high school's student council president. He left high school before graduation. He dabbled in municipal politics in Etobicoke. Smitherman decided against post-secondary education and began his political career. He worked as an organizer for the Ontario Liberal Party and Premier David Peterson. He was chief of staff to Ontario cabinet minister Hugh O'Neil and senior advisor to Ontario federal political ministers Herb Gray and David Collenette. He was chief of staff and campaign manager to one-time Mayor of Toronto Barbara Hall. He also ran a private consulting business and co-owned a photofinishing shop in downtown Toronto until 1994.

== Provincial politics ==
In the 1999 provincial election Smitherman was nominated as the Liberal Party candidate for the riding of Toronto Centre-Rosedale. Former Toronto mayor John Sewell was running as an independent candidate, and activists accusing him of splitting the left-wing vote with the New Democratic Party. Although a Progressive Conservative government was re-elected, Smitherman won the seat for the Liberals.

In the legislature, Smitherman was nicknamed "Furious George" for his aggressive and often abrasive manner, and rose to become McGuinty's right-hand man and favourite "attack dog". When asked about this nickname, Smitherman mockingly said that he was an "attack poodle". In the 2003 election Smitherman was re-elected and the Liberals won the election. Dalton McGuinty was sworn in as the 24th Premier of Ontario on October 23, 2003. Smitherman was named to cabinet as Minister of Health and Long-Term Care and the Toronto Regional Minister. In 2006, he was additionally named Deputy Premier of Ontario.

Under Smitherman's leadership, the Ministry of Health and Long-Term Care launched the Wait Times Strategy in 2004. The new health care model was designed to reduce wait times for various procedures such as hip and knee replacement, MRIs and CT scans. The Wait Times Strategy also focused on shrinking wait times for cancer, cardiac and cataracts surgeries.

Smitherman also launched the Ministry's "Aging at Home" strategy in 2007. The initiative focused on delivering enhanced community health care services and enabling seniors to live independent, healthy lives at home through home care and other community-based services.

In the 2007 election, Smitherman was re-elected as the MPP for Toronto Centre and continued in his roles as Minister of Health and Long-Term Care, Deputy Premier and Toronto Regional Minister.

However, Smitherman was criticized for ignoring calls for an independent investigation into C. difficile deaths in hospitals, and he was unable improve the lives of nursing home residents who were often forced to sit in soiled diapers for hours on end. Smitherman was also criticized for failures related to the implementation of an electronic health records system called eHealth that partly occurred during his tenure as Minister of Health and Long-Term Care. eHealth was under criticism for awarding no-bid contracts, as well as the $647 million spent on its predecessor, Smart Systems for Health Agency, which was shut down and restarted as eHealth. Smitherman's successor David Caplan resigned as Minister in 2009 to take responsibility for mistakes that were made.

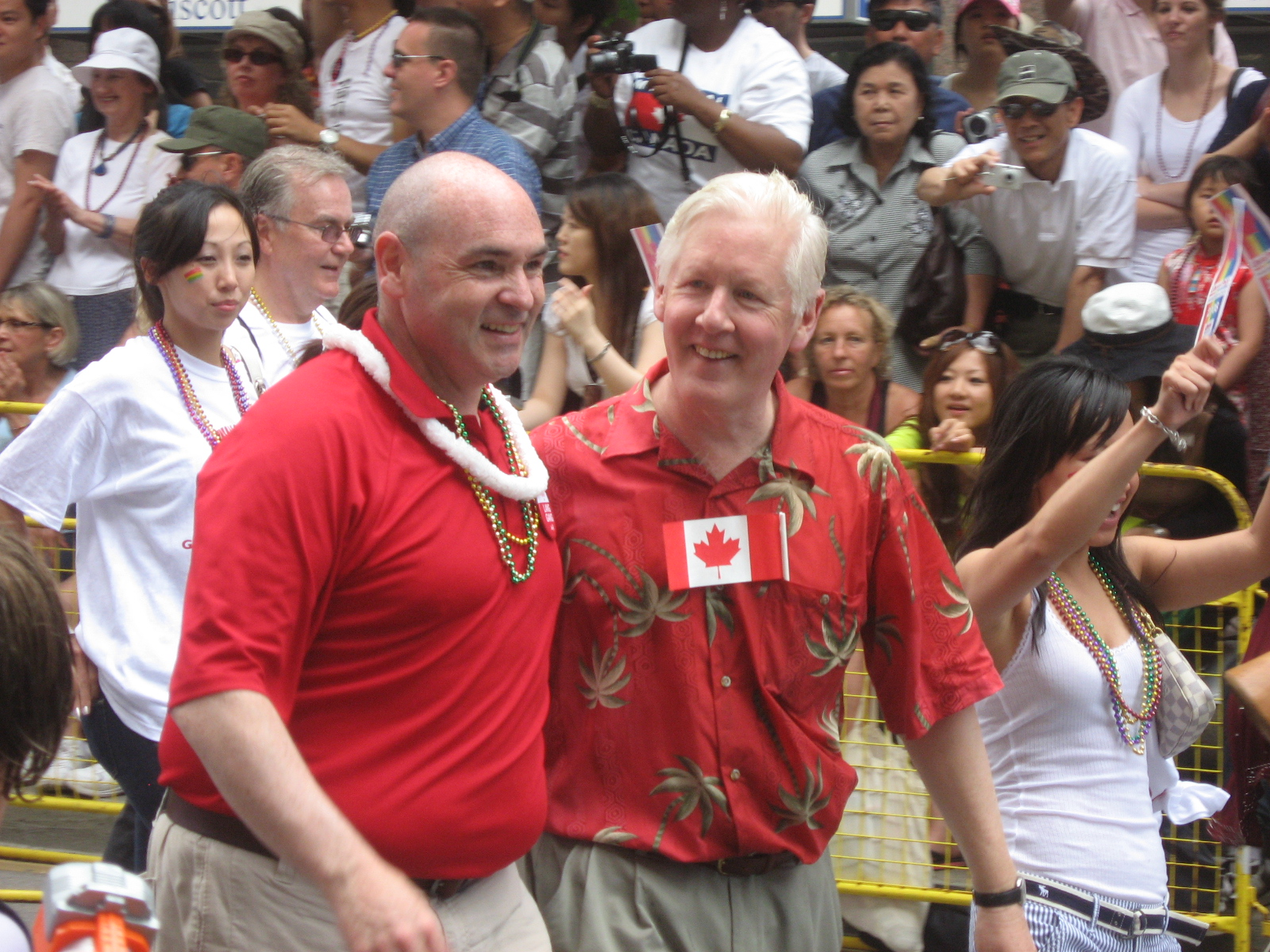
Smitherman with Bob Rae at the 2008 Pride Toronto parade

On June 20, 2008, Smitherman was shuffled to the new Ministry of Energy and Infrastructure, a merger of two formerly separate government departments. McGuinty dismissed suggestions that he combined the energy and infrastructure portfolios to satisfy Smitherman, saying, "I think it's a great fit, it's a natural fit, and it's an essential part of our plan to grow this economy."

As the Minister of Energy and Infrastructure, Smitherman was responsible for Ontario's Green Energy Act, which was passed in September 2009. The Act encourages investment in green energy production by providing businesses the ability to sell energy produced from renewable sources to the province's electricity grid through a Feed-in-Tariff program. The Green Energy Act has resulted in a series of record-breaking corporate investments in wind and solar energy worth billions of dollars.

The World Wind Energy Association chose Smitherman as the recipient of their annual World Wind Energy Award in 2009 for his outstanding achievements in making Ontario the leading wind energy jurisdiction in North America.

=== Cabinet positions ===
McGuinty ministry, Province of Ontario (2003–2013)
Cabinet posts (3)
Predecessor	Office	Successor
Gerry Phillips (Energy); David Caplan (Infrastructure)	Minister of Energy and Infrastructure; 2008–2009 new merged ministry	Gerry Phillips
Elizabeth Witmer	Deputy Premier of Ontario; 2006–2009	Dwight Duncan
Tony Clement	Minister of Health and Long-Term Care; 2003–2008	David Caplan

== Toronto mayoral election ==
On September 9, 2009, Smitherman strongly suggested that he would be running for mayor of Toronto in the upcoming 2010 mayoral election. He emphasized that any official announcements would not come before "the unofficial campaign season municipally begins in the new year".

On November 8, Smitherman announced his resignation from the provincial cabinet in order to run for mayor. He remained in the legislature as a backbench MPP until January 4, 2010.

In April 2010, Smitherman's campaign manager, Jeff Bangs, resigned and was replaced by Bruce Davis, chair of the Toronto District School Board and a veteran of local politics.

On August 21, 2010, the Ontario Liberal Party began distributing pamphlets, listing Smitherman's provincial record and endorsements, to 75,000 identified Liberal voters. This partisan endorsement led to speculation that Smitherman's political fortunes were connected with those of the Liberal provincial government. Several other mayoral candidates criticized Premier McGuinty and the provincial Liberals for jumping into the race.

Smitherman admitted telling a volunteer working for rival Rocco Rossi to "screw off". Smitherman claims he was set up by Rossi's campaign and he said the young woman tried to hand him a paper questioning his work with youth before a debate.

Smitherman's campaign has been criticized for swaying first to the left and then the right. After Labour Day, he made fiscal promises to freeze property taxes for a year and cut down on reckless spending.

Following the results of a Nanos Research poll, released on September 19, Smitherman made the following statement "The polling that we've seen tells us that if an election was held now, Rob Ford would be our mayor," Smitherman said. "That obviously provokes a certain distaste and reinforces for us that we need to work harder for the values of our city." The poll put Ford's level of support at 45.8% among decided voters. Smitherman held 21.3%, Joe Pantalone 16.8%, Rocco Rossi stood at 9.7% and Sarah Thomson at 6.4%. Smitherman vowed to lead the "anybody-but-Ford" movement and encouraged strategic voting.

In October, Smitherman picked up support. Sarah Thomson dropped out and endorsed Smitherman. Smitherman and his staff were also pressing some of Rocco Rossi’s key supporters to switch; Rossi soon dropped out due to being unable to improve poll numbers but did not endorse any other candidates. Former Toronto (pre-amalgamation) mayors David Crombie and Art Eggleton also endorsed Smitherman. Several left-leaning councilors who were normally allies of Joe Pantalone, Joe Mihevc, Adam Vaughan, and Pam McConnell, decided to back Smitherman's campaign instead. Smitherman urged strategic voting and repeatedly asserted, "a vote for Joe Pantalone is a vote for Rob Ford." Smitherman also left a voice-mail for outgoing Mayor David Miller, hoping that Miller would persuade Pantalone to bow out, but Miller never returned the call (back in 2003, Barbara Hall's campaign used back-channel efforts to discourage Miller's run for mayor) and gave a public endorsement of Pantalone instead. Following the results of the October 18 Angus Reid Public Opinion Poll, Smitherman and Ford were practically tied for first place, with Ford at 41% and Smitherman at 40%.

On election day, Smitherman finished second with 35.6% of the vote compared to Ford who won 47.1%.

== Post-political career ==
Smitherman joined radio station CFRB on an occasional basis in January 2011. He turned down an invitation from Premier McGuinty to run in the 2011 provincial election but said he intended to run for office again at some point in the future.

He was the chairman and principal at the consulting firm he founded, G & G Global Solutions and also a zone advisor to Ryerson University's Digital Media Zone.

He also serves on the boards of medical marijuana producer THC Meds Ontario Inc., drone maker Alta Vista Ventures and mining company Ceylon Graphite.

Smitherman considered returning to politics and seeking the Liberal Party of Canada's nomination for a federal by-election in Toronto Centre but announced on July 29, 2013, "I won't be a candidate now. I won't be contesting a riding in the 2015 general election or any other," as he prefers to prioritize "fun, family and finances".

Smitherman wrote a memoir called Unconventional Candour, published in 2019 by Dundurn Press.

Smitherman announced in February 2017 that he intended to run for a seat on Toronto City Council for one of the Toronto Centre wards in the 2018 municipal election. He said if he ran, he would divest himself of any current business interests that may pose a conflict. In May 2018, he confirmed that he would be running in Ward 23.

Smitherman had also expressed interest in returning to provincial politics and reclaiming his former riding of Toronto Centre in the 2018 provincial election, which was vacant following the resignation of Glen Murray, but faced resistance from the leadership of the Liberal Party which considered him an unsuitable candidate for the party's nomination due to his association with the eHealth scandal as well as his reputation for being difficult and temperamental, and threatened to disqualify his candidacy. In the face of this opposition, Smitherman decided not to pursue the Liberal nomination and instead focus on his municipal campaign.

He originally ran for an open seat but after Ontario Premier Doug Ford's government reduced the number of seats on Toronto City Council by half, Smitherman opted to run in Toronto Centre Ward 13 against incumbent councillors Kristyn Wong-Tam and Lucy Troisi for the new ward's single seat on council. He came in second, winning 15% of the vote to Wong-Tam's 50%.

== Electoral record ==
2018 Toronto municipal election — Ward 13, Toronto Centre
Candidate	Votes	Percentage
(x)Kristyn Wong-Tam	15,706	50.26%
George Smitherman	4,734	15.15%
(x)Lucy Troisi	2,698	8.63%
Khuram Aftab	1,794	5.74%
Walied Khogali Ali	1,408	4.51%
Ryan Lester	968	3.10%
Tim Gordanier	734	2.35%
Jon Callegher	713	2.28%
John Jeffery	530	1.70%
Catherina Perez	511	1.64%
Megann Willson	411	1.32%
Barbara Lavoie	176	0.56%
Jordan Stone	161	0.52%
Richard Forget	150	0.48%
Jonathan Heath	144	0.46%
Kyle McNally	138	0.44%
Darren Abramson	108	0.35%
Gladys Larbie	101	0.32%
Rob Wolvin	64	0.20%

2010 Toronto mayoral election
Candidate	Number of votes	% of popular vote
Rob Ford	380,201	47.098%
George Smitherman	287,393	35.602%
Joe Pantalone	94,840	11.749%
Rocco Rossi	4,973	0.616%
Others	39,842	4.936%
Total	807,249	100%

1999 Ontario general election
Party	Candidate	Votes	%
Liberal	George Smitherman	17,756	38.9
Progressive Conservative	Durhane Wong-Rieger	13,640	29.88
Independent	John Sewell	8,822	19.33
New Democratic	Helen Breslauer	4,019	8.8
Green	Joseph Cohen	392	0.86
Freedom	Paul McKeever	344	0.75
Independent	Mike Ryner	236	0.52
Family Coalition	Bill Whatcott	232	0.51
Natural Law	Ron Parker	205	0.45

2003 Ontario general election
Party	Candidate	Votes	%	±%
Liberal	George Smitherman	23,872	52.78	13.88
Progressive Conservative	John Adams	9,968	22.04	−7.84
New Democratic	Gene Lara	9,112	20.14	11.34
Green	Gabriel Draven	1,739	3.84	2.98
Independent	Philip Fernandez	324	0.72	
Freedom	Silvio Ursomarzo	218	0.48	−0.27

2007 Ontario general election: Toronto Centre
Party	Candidate	Votes	%	±%
Liberal	George Smitherman	21,522	47.85	−5.03
Progressive Conservative	Pamela Taylor	9,084	20.20	−1.63
New Democratic	Sandra Gonzalez	8,464	18.82	−1.28
Green	Mike McLean	4,412	9.81	5.82
Libertarian	Michael Green	686	1.53	
Special Needs	Danish Ahmed	259	0.58	
Communist	Johan Boyden	196	0.44	
Independent	Philip Fernandez	191	0.42	−0.37
Independent	Gary Leroux	167	0.37	
Total valid votes		44,981	100.00	
Total rejected, unmarked and declined ballots		457	1.02	
Turnout		45,438	49.90	
Eligible voters		91,050		
