= Angus Reid (entrepreneur) =

Canadian market researcher (born 1947)

- Born: December 17, 1947 (age 78); Regina, Saskatchewan, Canada
- Education: University of Manitoba (B.A., M.A.); Carleton (Ph.D.)

Angus Reid (born December 17, 1947) is a Canadian entrepreneur, pollster, and sociologist. He is the chairman of the Angus Reid Institute and CEO and founder of Angus Reid Global. He is director of the Reid Campbell Group which operates Rival Technologies and Reach 3 Insights. He has written numerous columns on environmental, legal, economic, social, and political issues and is the author of Shakedown: How the New Economy is Changing our Lives (1996).

== Personal life and education ==
Reid was born in Regina, Saskatchewan, on December 17, 1947.

Enrolled at the University of Manitoba Faculty of Arts, he earned both his B.A. in sociology and history in 1969 and his M.A. in Sociology in 1971. Subsequently, in 1974, he received a Ph.D. in sociology from Carleton University in Ottawa. Following his doctoral thesis on the professional socialization of dental students, he took on a position at the University of Manitoba's Faculty of Medicine.

== Career ==
From 1974 to 1980, Reid held an appointment in the University of Manitoba's Faculty of Medicine, Department of Social and Preventive Medicine.

In 1979, he founded Angus Reid Group, Inc., a market research supplier that grew into the largest research firm in Canada, with revenues of $60 million. He remained CEO until 2001, selling the organization to Ipsos SA in 2000 to later operate as Ipsos-Reid. Operations in Canada still continue under the name Ipsos as the Canadian arm of the global Ipsos Group.

In 2004, he became CEO of Vision Critical, his son Andrew's research software development startup. Shortly after, he created Angus Reid Strategies (which integrated with Vision Critical) to apply Vision Critical's technologies to market research. In 2011, Angus Reid became the chairman at Vision Critical.

In 2014, Reid retired from Vision Critical to found the Angus Reid Institute, a not-for-profit organization dedicated to the advancement of public opinion research in Canada on critical social, economic and policy issues. And in February 2019, he returned from retirement to launch Angus Reid Global, a new market research and opinion polling firm serving businesses and organizations across Canada and around the globe.

== Philanthropy ==
Reid is the founder and chairman of the Angus Reid Institute, a federally incorporated charitable foundation dedicated to the measurement and advancement of public opinion in Canada on critical social, economic, and policy issues.

In 2010, Reid became a major funder and co-founder of the R. James Travers Foreign Corresponding Fellowship, based in Ottawa. This initiative provides $25,000 per year in funding for a foreign correspondent to pursue a major story of interest to Canada.

Since 2011, he has been the founder and major funder for the Monarca Foundation, a Canadian registered charity dedicated to helping families with emergency food, medical supplies, and schooling in Mexico. Additionally, Reid was a major donor for the Blusson Spinal Care Center at Vancouver General Hospital in 2010, and St. Paul's High School in Winnipeg in 2001 and 2014.

Reid was the chair of the CKNW Orphans Fund between 2002 and 2007 as well as the founding chair between 2002 and 2005 at the Canada Institute: Woodrow Wilson International Center for Scholars in Washington, D.C., where he now serves as a member of the advisory board.

Reid was also a board member of the Rick Hansen Foundation between 2002 and 2008, the Norman Paterson School of International Affairs at Carleton University in 2010, and Nestle Canada between 1991 and 2003. Reid was also director at Canada 125 in 1992, Care Canada between 1990 and 1992, and the Public Policy Forum between 2006 and 2008.

== Angus Reid Institute ==
The Angus Reid Institute is a national not-for-profit public opinion research organization that provides information on Canadian issues and trends affecting social, economic, public administration, governance, domestic and foreign policy. Based in Vancouver, British Columbia, it has the status of a registered charity in Canada.

Founded in October 2014 by Angus Reid, the Institute commissions, researches and disseminates original impartial statistical public opinion polling and policy analysis. It makes this information available through its website, publications, news media, consultants, social media channels, and its partners.

In fall 2016, the Angus Reid Institute and Canadian Broadcasting Corporation partnered for a nationwide polling project. Stories from the study included Canadian views of multiculturalism in 2016, Quebec's diminished desire for separatism, and the lower levels of pride among Canadian millennials.

Angus Reid also published a column discussing the perceptions and realities of multiculturalism in Canada.

== Angus Reid Group ==
Angus Reid Group (formerly Angus Reid Global) is a market research company serving the research intelligence needs of businesses and organizations across North America.

Launched in June 2019, the company is Reid's latest business venture.

With offices in Vancouver, British Columbia, and Toronto, Ontario, Angus Reid Group offers a suite of data collection tools to measure public opinion and consumer attitudes and behaviors on a variety of topics. Central to that is the Angus Reid Forum, a web-based public-opinion community of thousands of respondents in Canada and the United States who answer questions and surveys on various topics.

Angus Reid employs a cross-section of experts in the fields of panel management, market and opinion research, and data solutions offering research services for businesses, brands, governments, not-for-profit organizations, and others.

== Angus Reid Public Opinion ==
Angus Reid Public Opinion was a public affairs practice arm of Vision Critical, a software development company that creates online research tools. It was established in 2006 under the name Angus Reid Strategies.

Located at Vision Critical's headquarters in Vancouver, Angus Reid Public Opinion conducted regional, national and multi-country research. Angus Reid polls were conducted using the Angus Reid Forum, Springboard America, and Springboard UK online panels. Angus Reid Public Opinion used technology created by Vision Critical to send surveys on political and social issues that panelists can respond to from their computers, tablets, or smartphones.

== Honours ==
He is a recipient of a Canada Council Doctoral Fellowship, the Entrepreneur of the Year award for the Pacific Region in the "services" Category, and was inducted into the Marketing Hall of Legends in 2010. In 1996, he received an honorary Ll.D. degree from the University of Manitoba. He has also been awarded honorary doctorates from Simon Fraser University (2003) and Carleton University (2008).
