= Alida (software company) =

Canadian company established in 2000

Alida Inc.
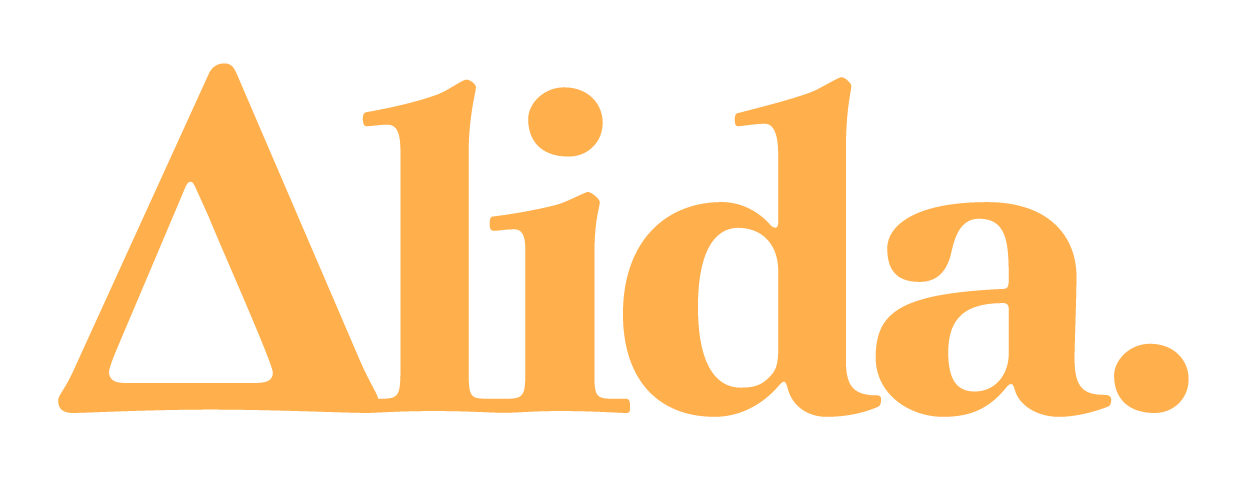
- Formerly: Vision Critical
- Company type: Private
- Industry: Market Research
- Founded: 2000; 26 years ago
- Headquarters: Toronto, Ontario, Canada
- Area served: Worldwide
- Key people: Efrem Ainsley (CEO); Mary Kay Evans (CMO); Jeff Wasyliw (CFO); Joe Finneran (Global Head of R&D)
- Products: Research and Insights Platform
- Subsidiaries: Angus Reid Public Opinion
- Website: www.alida.com

Alida is a Canadian software company that provides market research and analysis tools. It allows research communities to gather feedback to improve customer experiences and product innovation.

The company is headquartered in Toronto and has offices in Vancouver, Hong Kong, London, Manila, Minneapolis, Munich, New York, Paris, Seattle, Singapore, and Sydney. Alida’s Total Experience Management platform helps organizations build verified and engaged communities of customers.

== History ==
The company was founded as Vision Critical in 2000 by Andrew Reid.

By 2011 the company had installed its 500th digital community. In 2019, the company expanded into the customer experience management market with a new executive team.

In 2020, Vision Critical rebranded to Alida. Between 2020 - 2022 the company released over 200 new enhancements to its Total Experience Management platform.
