= Joe Pantalone =

Canadian politician

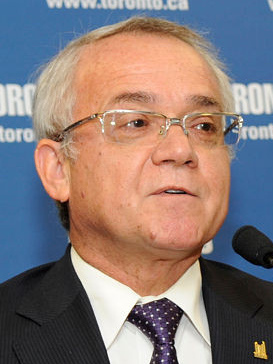
- Pantalone in November 2009

Toronto City Councillor for Ward 19 Trinity-Spadina
- In office December 1, 2000 – November 30, 2010
- Preceded by: New ward
- Succeeded by: Mike Layton

Deputy Mayor of Toronto
- In office 2003–2010
- Preceded by: Case Ootes
- Succeeded by: Doug Holyday

Toronto City Councillor for Ward 26 Trinity Niagara
- In office January 1, 1998 – November 30, 2000 Serving with Mario Silva
- Preceded by: New ward
- Succeeded by: Ward abolished

Metro Toronto Councillor for Ward 4 Trinity Niagara
- In office 1985 – December 31, 1997
- Preceded by: New ward
- Succeeded by: Ward abolished

Junior Alderman for Ward 4 Trinity-Bellwoods
- In office 1980–1985 Serving with Tony O'Donohue
- Preceded by: George Ben
- Succeeded by: Ward renamed

Personal details
- Born: February 22, 1952 (age 74) Racalmuto, Sicily, Italy
- Occupation: Legal worker

Joe Pantalone (born February 22, 1952) is a retired Canadian politician who served on Toronto City Council and Metro Council from 1980 to 2010. Pantalone was the deputy mayor of Toronto from 2003 to 2010, and represented the Trinity area as a councillor.

== Early life ==
Born in the town of Racalmuto, Sicily, Italy to a sharecropping father, Joe Pantalone is the second oldest of 7 children. Pantalone, who is also often referred to as "Joey Pants", immigrated to Canada with his family at age thirteen. His father was a "pick and shovel" man who earned his living building the Toronto subway system, and his mother was a seamstress. He attended Harbord Collegiate Institute where he was elected Student Council President. He then obtained a degree in geography from the University of Toronto.

Before entering politics, Pantalone was active as a community legal worker for the unemployed and a vocational counsellor.

== Political career ==
=== City Councillor ===
Entering politics, Pantalone lost four bids for a municipal seat before finally winning in the 1980 municipal election. In the 1987 provincial election, he ran as an Ontario New Democratic Party candidate in the riding of Fort York. He lost a very close race to Liberal candidate Bob Wong by only 137 votes. In 1985, Pantalone was successful in his bid to be elected to the Metropolitan Toronto council. He ran for the chair of Metro Council in 1991 and 1994, but he lost both times to Alan Tonks. On council, his most prominent role was as chairman of Exhibition Place and he is often credited with bringing the facility that was in deficit in 1999 to the point of fiscal stability, as it is today.

The 1997 amalgamation election, so-called because of the forced amalgamation of all the municipalities that made up Metropolitan Toronto, saw Pantalone returned to Toronto City Council as the Councillor for Ward 20—Trinity Niagara, which was under the same boundaries as his previous Metro seat, during Mel Lastman's term as Mayor of Toronto (1997–2003).

During his career, Pantalone served on numerous committees for Toronto City Council. He served as the Chair of the Planning and Transportation Committee under Mel Lastman, and was also a commissioner for the Toronto Transit Commission. At that time Mel Lastman appointed him as "Tree Advocate", a title he gave up in 2006. He has also chaired various committees including Urban Environment and Development, Metro Drug Abuse Prevention Task Force, National Trade Centre Building Committee. He was the founder of the Toronto Parks and Trees Foundation.

=== Deputy Mayor ===
With the election of David Miller as mayor in the 2003 election, Pantalone was appointed as one of three deputy mayors. He retained this position alone after the 2006 election, while Mike Feldman was dropped and Sandra Bussin became speaker of city council.

As of 2010, Pantalone held positions such as the Chair of Exhibition Place, while Mayor Miller also appointed Pantalone to be Director of Toronto Hydro and the Vice-Chair of the Executive Committee. He is also a member of 11 community based Business Improvement Associations in the City of Toronto.

In 2006, Pantalone spent $248,817 in salary and benefits for his support staff, the second highest on council after Howard Moscoe. He argued that he had executive assistants and both were very senior and so were paid more. In an interview, he stated "Historically, people have wanted to stay with me ... and I think the city got good value out of them. I like to be No. 1 in giving to the city, so sometimes it (means) No. 1 in expenses, too".

=== 2010 Mayoralty Bid ===
Pantalone was a candidate for Mayor of Toronto in the 2010 municipal election. In his campaign, Pantalone highlighted his 29 years of experience in municipal politics compared to other candidates, saying, "People are looking around at the outsiders and think their experience does not match mine"; he also said the approach to the city's finances should be "clinical as opposed to a sledgehammer."

"I consider myself the heir of David Miller, Mel Lastman and Alan Tonks. In our society you build on the past," he said. "(But) I am quite different than David Miller."

Pantalone announced his bid in 2009 after incumbent David Miller decided not to run. After Adam Giambrone exited the race when a sex scandal undermined his campaign, this left Pantalone as the only major contender to represent the left against Rob Ford and George Smitherman. Pantalone was endorsed by many left-wing politicians such as Jack Layton, the leader of Federal New Democratic Party, Stephen Lewis and Ed Broadbent.

On October 6, 2010 outgoing Toronto mayor David Miller announced that he would be supporting Pantalone

Pantalone's campaign emphasized continuance of the existing plans of the current administration, with particular focus on large scale transit expansion in the form of the Transit City initiative negotiated with the provincial Ontario government by the Miller administration. As well, Pantalone promised a number of small adjustments to the City of Toronto tax structures, such as reducing property tax for condominium owners which he justified because he said they use less city services and "It’s only fair that their taxes be commensurate", freezing property taxes for retirees earning less than $50,000 a year and eliminating an unpopular vehicle registration tax that he supported as a councillor and Deputy Mayor for David Miller. On his promise to freeze property taxes for seniors, Pantalone expressed the opinion that the loss of this revenue could be made up elsewhere, saying: "If you distribute that across the whole tax base, people won’t even know that it has happened".

He also promised to build a world standard professional cricket pitch modeled on the BMO Field which he helped bring to the CNE fair grounds. Pantalone claimed that he was "no clone of David Miller", nonetheless his platform largely continued the status quo with Miller's policies. Pantalone said that Toronto is a "garden", and that Ford and Smitherman would endanger it. Pantalone stated "I want to prune, trim and shape. I don’t want to do major surgical limb cuts. If you want that, call Mr. Ford," who is a "bulldozer" while Smitherman is an "axe" and a "diminisher."" Pantalone was also the only candidate who rejected contracting out more services now done by city employees. However, several pundits suggested that Pantalone had largely misread the electorate, as a Nanos Research poll showed that a combined 83% of decided voters supported mayoral candidates who advocated sweeping changes.

Pantalone never managed to break the 20% threshold in opinion polls and he consistently polled in third place in the mid to low teens behind Smitherman and Ford.

In the final weeks of the campaign, speculation rose in the media that Pantalone might withdraw in order to solidify a vote behind his competitor Smitherman, in an effort to prevent the election of Ford. A handful of city councillors (Adam Vaughan and fellow NDP members Joe Mihevc and Pam McConnell) who were longtime allies on Pantalone in the Miller administration cast their lot in with Smitherman in an effort to sway voters to support a single winning candidate. Smitherman repeatedly asserted that "a vote for Joe Pantalone is a vote for Rob Ford", but Pantalone refused to bow out despite pressure. Smitherman left a voice-mail with Miller to ask Pantalone to withdraw from the race but Miller never returned the call. (Back in the 2003 mayoral election, Smitherman had worked for the campaign of Barbara Hall, which tried to persuade Miller to drop out of the race.)

The election night results suggests that it would have been unlikely that strategic voting would have prevented the eventual outcome because the combined vote for Pantalone and Smitherman total exceeded Ford's vote by only just under 2000 votes—victory for Smitherman would have required nearly unanimous support from Pantalone's 95,000 supporters. The election was something of a surprise because Ford captured a large 11% point lead over his nearest rival, Smitherman, when opinion polls had suggested they were neck and neck at the finish. Voter turnout was 13% higher than the previous election in 2006, indicating that voters were very interested in this hotly contested race.

== Post-politics ==
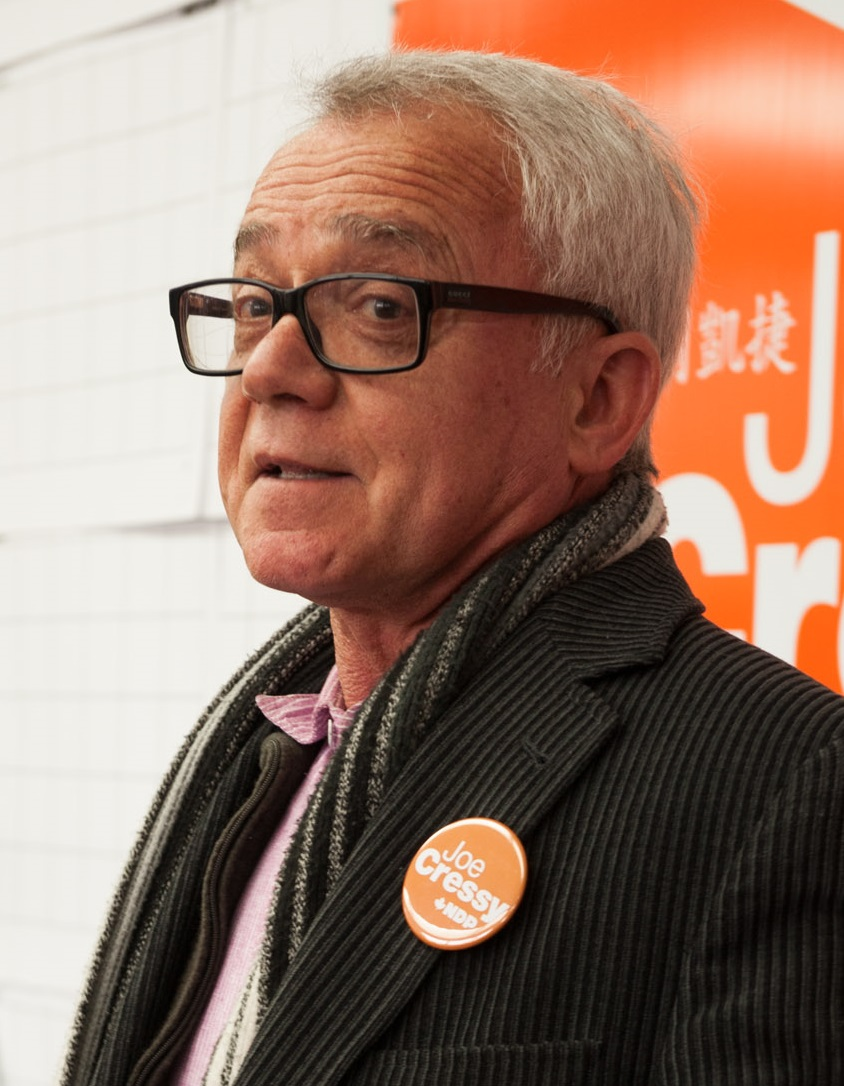
Pantalone in 2014

Pantalone is now urban affairs specialist at Joe Pantalone Consulting Limited and received the Queen Elizabeth II Diamond Jubilee Medal in 2012. Pantalone has also been a volunteer at a local community garden and member of Waterfront Toronto.

== Election results ==
2010 Toronto mayoral election
Rob Ford	383,501	47.1%
George Smitherman	289,832	35.6%
Joe Pantalone	95,482	11.7%
All others	45,169	5.5%
Total	813,984	100.0%

Unofficial results as of October 26, 2010 03:55 AM, 1870 out of 1870 polls reporting.
