= Pam McConnell =

20th and 21st-century Canadian politician (1946-2017)

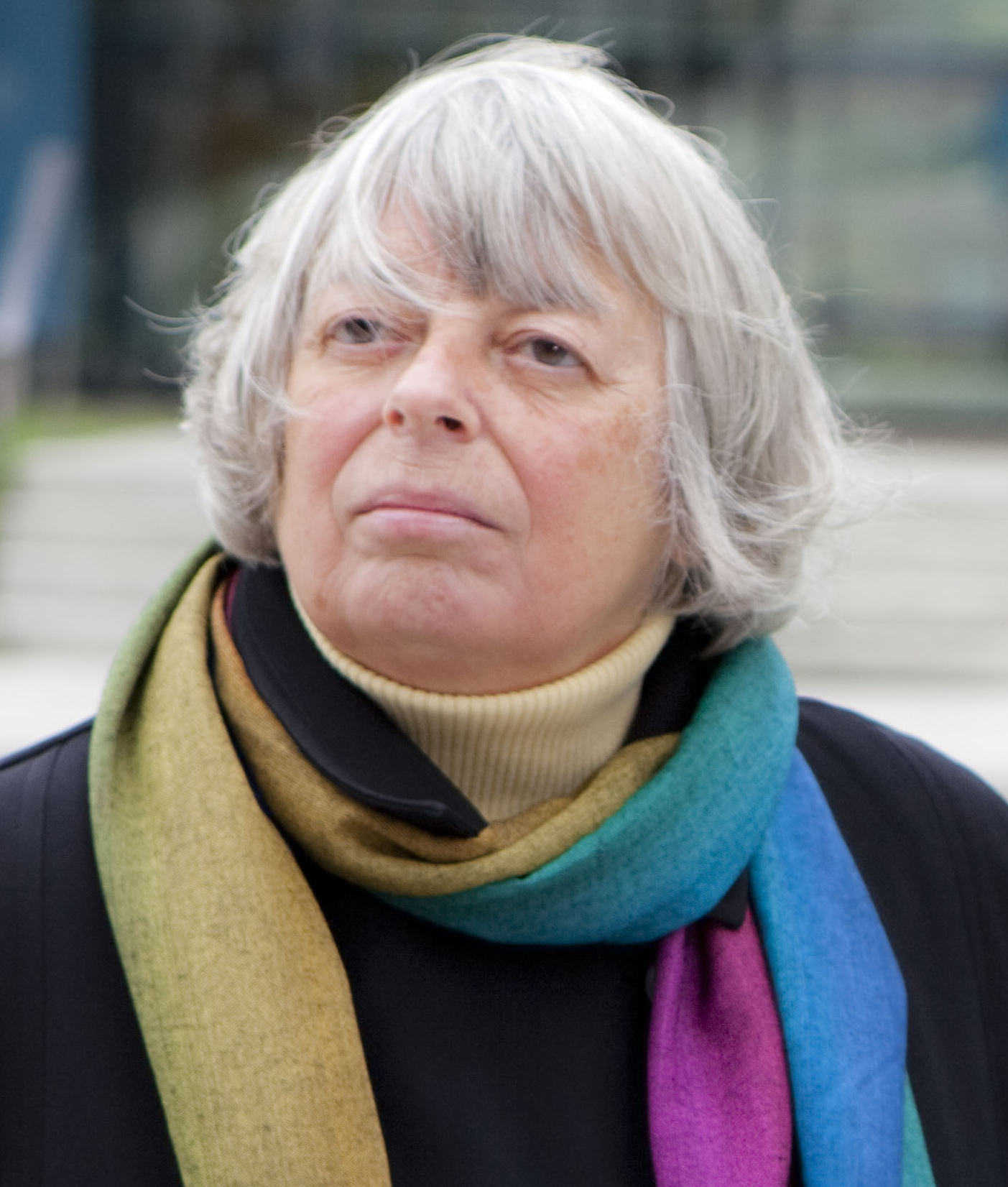
- Pam McConnell in 2014

Deputy Mayor of Toronto for Toronto and East York
- In office December 1, 2014 – July 7, 2017
- Mayor: John Tory
- Preceded by: Position established
- Succeeded by: Ana Bailão

Toronto City Councillor for Ward 28 Toronto Centre—Rosedale
- In office December 1, 2000 – July 7, 2017
- Preceded by: Ward created
- Succeeded by: Lucy Troisi

Toronto City Councillor for Ward 25 Don River
- In office January 1, 1998 – December 1, 2000 Serving with Jack Layton
- Preceded by: Ward created
- Succeeded by: Ward abolished

Metropolitan Toronto Councillor for Ward 7 Regent Park and Cabbagetown
- In office December 1, 1994 – January 1, 1998
- Preceded by: Barbara Hall
- Succeeded by: City amalgamated

Chair of the Toronto Police Services Board
- In office October 21, 2004 – October 14, 2005
- Preceded by: Alan Heisey
- Succeeded by: Alok Mukherjee

Chair of the Toronto and East York Community Council
- In office December 1, 2008 – December 1, 2010
- Preceded by: Janet Davis
- Succeeded by: Gord Perks

Personal details
- Born: Pamela Margaret Ritchie; February 14, 1946 Carlisle, Cumberland, England
- Died: July 7, 2017 (aged 71) Toronto, Ontario, Canada
- Party: Independent
- Other political affiliations: New Democratic
- Spouse: Jim McConnell
- Children: 2
- Occupation: Teacher

Pamela Margaret McConnell (February 14, 1946 – July 7, 2017) was a Canadian politician who served on Toronto City Council. She was first elected to the Metro Toronto Council in 1994, representing a series of downtown Toronto wards until 2017. She served as a deputy mayor of Toronto, representing Toronto and East York from 2014 to 2017.

McConnell was a teacher before entering politics. She was elected as a public school trustee in 1982 and held that position until she was elected to Metro Council in 1994. After the amalgamation of Toronto, she was elected to the new city council, serving from 1998 until her death in 2017.

McConnell received an award from the Duke of Edinburgh in 1997 for her work with inner city youth, and received the Queen's Diamond Jubilee Medal in 2013. The Pam McConnell Young Women in Leadership Award was created in 2018 for women between the ages of 19 and 26. In addition, the Pam McConnell Aquatic Center in Toronto is named after her. The Federation of Canadian Municipalities (FCM) created the Award for Gender Equality in International Development and named it the Pam McConnell Award.

== Early life ==
McConnell was born on February 14, 1946, in England; her family emigrated to Canada in 1954 when she was 9 years old. She was a teacher before entering politics by being elected as a Toronto Board of Education school trustee in 1982. She held that position until 1994. She played a prominent role in advocating for adult literacy programs. In 1988, she became vice-chair of the Toronto School Board and, in 1992, became its chair.

== Political career ==
In 1994, she left the school board and was elected to Toronto City Council in a close race. With the amalgamation of Toronto with five suburban municipalities in 1997, she was forced into a tough election. With wards electing two councillors each, she faced fellow New Democratic Party (NDP) incumbents Jack Layton and Peter Tabuns, edging out Tabuns for the second councillor position by just over two hundred votes. With Tabuns and Layton nominated as the "official" NDP candidates by the ward's NDP association, McConnell's decision to run caused her to be estranged from her fellow New Democrats for a period, and she supported Liberal-backed Barbara Hall as a candidate for Mayor of Toronto in the 2003 municipal election against New Democrat David Miller.

She maintained her membership in the NDP, however, and became more active with the party since 2003. She was a Miller ally since the election and, served as chair of the Toronto Police Services Board from 2004 to 2005 overseeing the selection of a new Toronto police chief Bill Blair. She also served as vice-chair of the board.

McConnell has also been an advocate of children's issues on city council.

McConnell served as a member of Toronto City Council for Ward 28 from its creation in 2000, and was re-elected every term until her death. In November 2013, she briefly became a subject of national and international news coverage when Mayor Rob Ford, during council debate on November 18 around him of discretionary powers following his drug use scandal, got up out of his chair and began to run in the council chamber, bumping into McConnell and knocking her to the ground.

McConnell is credited for her role in advocating poverty reduction and the Regent Park revitalization. She championed the development of an aquatic centre in Regent Park. Two million dollars of the cost the new centre was directed through section 37 funding (a part of the Planning Act which allows the city to receive community benefiting funding from developers) from the construction of the Trump International Hotel and Tower. In a 2012 interview, Donald Trump described McConnell as a "tough negotiator" and a "terrific representant for her district", and credited her for securing the funding for the centre from his development.

Following the 2014 Toronto municipal election, new mayor John Tory appointed McConnell as one of four deputy mayors representing the city, and in 2015 he selected her as the champion of the city's poverty reduction strategy. McConnell is credited for her role in advocating poverty reduction and the revitalization of the Regent Park neighbourhood.

== Awards and honors ==
McConnell received an award from the Duke of Edinburgh in 1997 for her work with inner city youth. In 2013, she received the Queen's Diamond Jubilee Medal in recognition of her decades of public service. In January 2018, Toronto Mayor John Tory announced the creation of the Pam McConnell Young Women in Leadership Award for women between the ages of 19 and 26. In June 2018, the Federation of Canadian Municipalities posthumously awarded McConnell a place in its Roll of Honour, as well as created the Pam McConnell International Award for Gender Equity, to recognize "the contributions of a Canadian municipal expert to the advancement and promotion of gender equality in FCM's programs." In July 2018, Toronto City Council voted to name the city's aquatic centre in Regent Park after McConnell, the Pam McConnell Aquatic Centre was a key development that McConnell advocated for while serving on council.

== Personal life ==
McConnell had two daughters, Heather Ann and Madelyn, with her husband Jim. On July 6, 2017, McConnell was reportedly in hospital and was referred to as "gravely ill" by Mayor John Tory. She died on July 7, 2017, from a lung condition.

== Election results ==
2014 Toronto election, Ward 28
Candidate	Votes	%
Pam McConnell	14,047	55.80%
David Blackmore	2,852	11.33%
Jonathan Hughes	2,416	9.60%
Andy Melnyk	1,964	7.80%
Daniel Patel	965	3.83%
Total	25,173	100%

2010 Toronto election, Ward 28
Candidate	Votes	%
Pam McConnell	11,883	62.856%
Howard Bortenstein	3,730	19.73%
Dennis Hollingsworth	1,128	5.967%
Raj Rama	969	5.126%
Daniel Murton	633	3.348%
Eric Brazau	562	2.973%
Total	18,905	100%
