= Olivia Chow =

Mayor of Toronto since 2023

Her Worship Olivia Chow
- 鄒至蕙
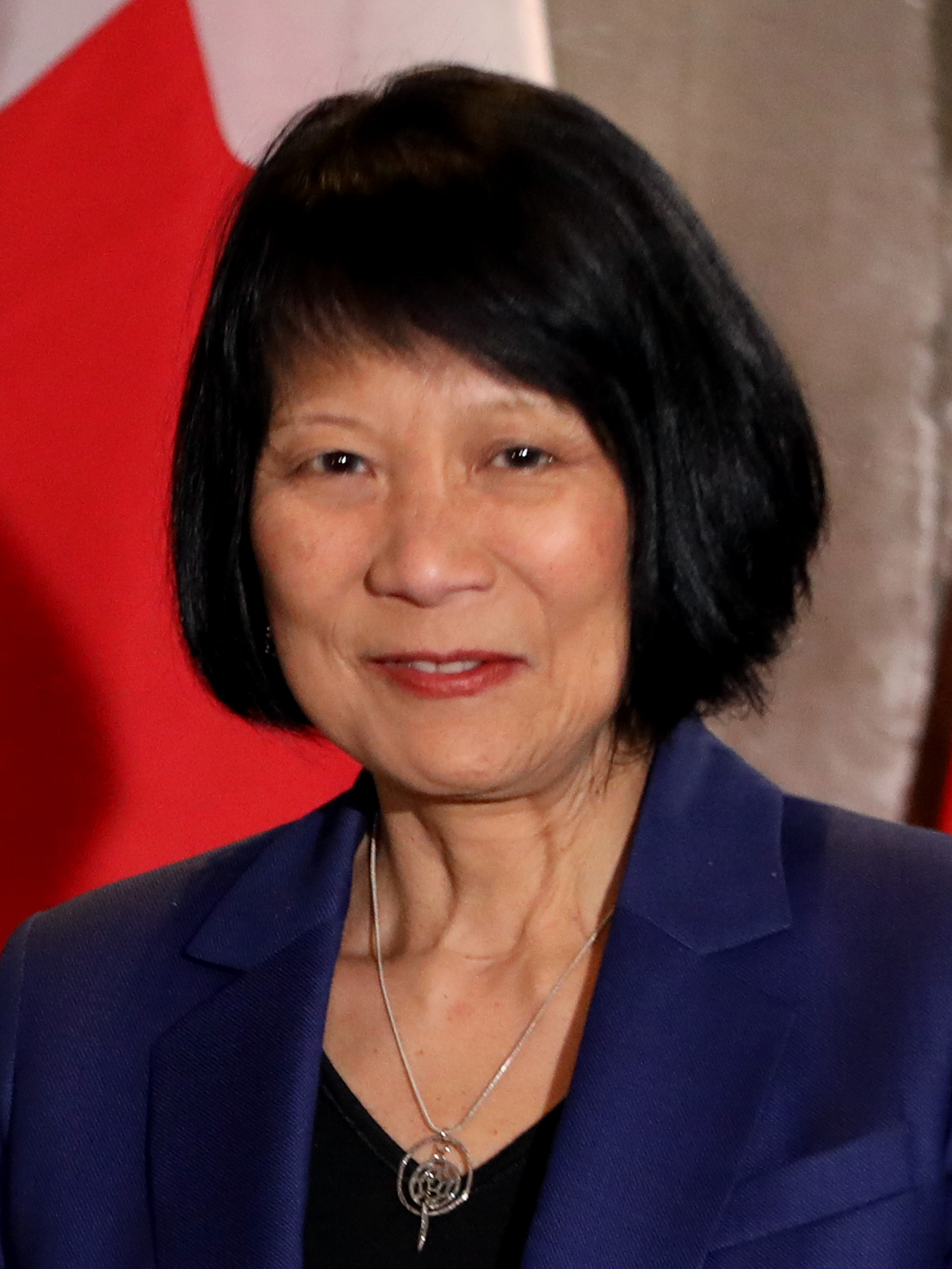
- Chow in 2024

66th Mayor of Toronto
- Incumbent
- Assumed office July 12, 2023
- Deputy: Jennifer McKelvie; Ausma Malik
- Preceded by: John Tory

Member of Parliament for Trinity—Spadina
- In office January 23, 2006 – March 12, 2014
- Preceded by: Tony Ianno
- Succeeded by: Adam Vaughan

Toronto City Councillor
- In office January 1, 1998 – November 28, 2005
- Preceded by: Municipality formed
- Succeeded by: Martin Silva (2006)
- Constituency: Ward 20 Trinity—Spadina (2000–2005); Ward 24 Downtown (1998–2000)

Metropolitan Toronto Councillor for Ward 24 Downtown
- In office January 1, 1992 – December 31, 1997
- Preceded by: Dale Martin
- Succeeded by: Municipality dissolved

Other roles
- 1985–1991: Toronto Board of Education Trustee

Personal details
- Born: March 24, 1957 (age 69) British Hong Kong
- Party: Independent (Note: In Ontario, municipal politicians are elected on a non-partisan basis.)
- Other political affiliations: New Democratic (federal)
- Spouse: Jack Layton (m. 1988; died 2011)
- Education: Ontario College of Art; University of Toronto; University of Guelph (BA)
- Occupation: Politician
- Website: oliviachow.ca

Chinese name
- Traditional Chinese: 鄒至蕙
- Simplified Chinese: 邹至蕙
Transcriptions
Standard Mandarin
- Hanyu Pinyin: Zōu Zhìhuì
- Wade–Giles: Tsou^{1} Chih^{4} Hui^{4}
Yue: Cantonese
- Yale Romanization: Jāu Ji-waih
- Jyutping: Zau1 Zi3 Wai6

Olivia Chow (Note: Chinese: 鄒至蕙; Cantonese Yale: Jāu Ji-waih) (born March 24, 1957) is a Canadian politician who has been the 66th and current mayor of Toronto since 2023. Previously, Chow served as the New Democratic Party (NDP) member of Parliament (MP) for Trinity—Spadina from 2006 to 2014, and was a councillor on the Metro Toronto Council from 1992 to the 1998 amalgamation followed by Toronto City Council until 2005.

Born in British Hong Kong, Chow was first elected in 1985 as a Toronto school board trustee. She ran in the 1991 Toronto election, where she was elected to Metropolitan Toronto Council and remained active in local Toronto politics until her election to the House of Commons in the 2006 federal election. Her husband, Jack Layton, was also an MP, serving as leader of the Official Opposition in 2011 and leader of the NDP from 2003 until his death in 2011. Chow resigned her seat in Parliament in 2014 to run for mayor in the 2014 election, placing third to John Tory and Doug Ford. Following her 2014 campaign, she joined Toronto Metropolitan University (then known as Ryerson University) as a distinguished visiting professor. In the 2015 federal election, she unsuccessfully ran in Spadina—Fort York.

Chow was elected mayor in 2023 following Tory's resignation, defeating former deputy mayor Ana Bailão and former police chief Mark Saunders. Chow is Toronto's first Chinese-Canadian mayor and the first woman to serve as mayor of Toronto since its amalgamation. During her first term, Chow implemented increases in property taxes, a TTC fare freeze, announced more protections for renters, and signed a "New Deal" with the provincial government. Chow was re-elected in 2026, defeating city councillor Brad Bradford.

== Early life and career ==
Olivia Chow was born in British Hong Kong, to Ho Sze, a schoolteacher, and Wilson Wai Sun Chow, a school superintendent. She was raised in a middle-class family in Happy Valley, a residential area in Hong Kong. She immigrated to Canada with her family in 1970 at the age of 13, settling in Toronto, where they first lived on the third floor of a rooming house in the Annex, before moving to a high-rise unit in St. James Town. Her father worked odd jobs, such as delivering Chinese food and driving taxis to support the family. Her mother became a seamstress and a maid, and worked in a hotel laundry. Her father suffered from mental illness and was physically abusive towards her half-brother, Andre, and her mother, but "nurturing and loving" towards Olivia.

Chow was raised in a Chinese Baptist household. As a young girl she was a slow learner and had to repeat grade 3. However, she soon started to excel academically and she later skipped grade 8. She attended Jarvis Collegiate Institute and studied fine arts at the Ontario College of Art, and philosophy and religion at Victoria College in the University of Toronto. In 1979, she graduated with an Honours Bachelor of Arts in fine art from the University of Guelph.

After graduation, she worked as an artist. She owned a sculpture studio and created art pieces for clients. She still paints occasionally. She later taught at George Brown College's Assaulted Women and Children Counselling and Advocacy Program for five years.

== Early political career ==
=== School board ===
Chow first became active in politics working in the riding office of local NDP MP Dan Heap in the early 1980s.

With Heap's support, Chow ran for school board trustee for Ward 6, and won in November 1985. Beginning in 1986, Chow sought for programming to protect students on the basis of sexuality, spurred by incidents of harassment she was shown, and by the murder of Kenneth Zeller, a school librarian. This led to the introduction of what was believed to be Ontario's first sexuality school program, approved in May 1988 with support of director of education Ned McKeown. She served as head of the school board's race relations committee.

=== Metro and City Council ===
Popular on the school board, she was handily elected to Metropolitan Toronto Council in the 1991 election for the Metro Toronto ward of Downtown (this ward was abolished in the 1997 amalgamation). The area had long been home to a diverse group of communities in the core of Canada's largest urban centre. Chow was re-elected several times to city council by wide margins. As councillor, Chow was an advocate for the homeless, public transit, and many other urban issues that promote sustainable development. She was also a vociferous opponent of the proposed Toronto Island Airport expansion, a controversial plan by the Toronto Port Authority.

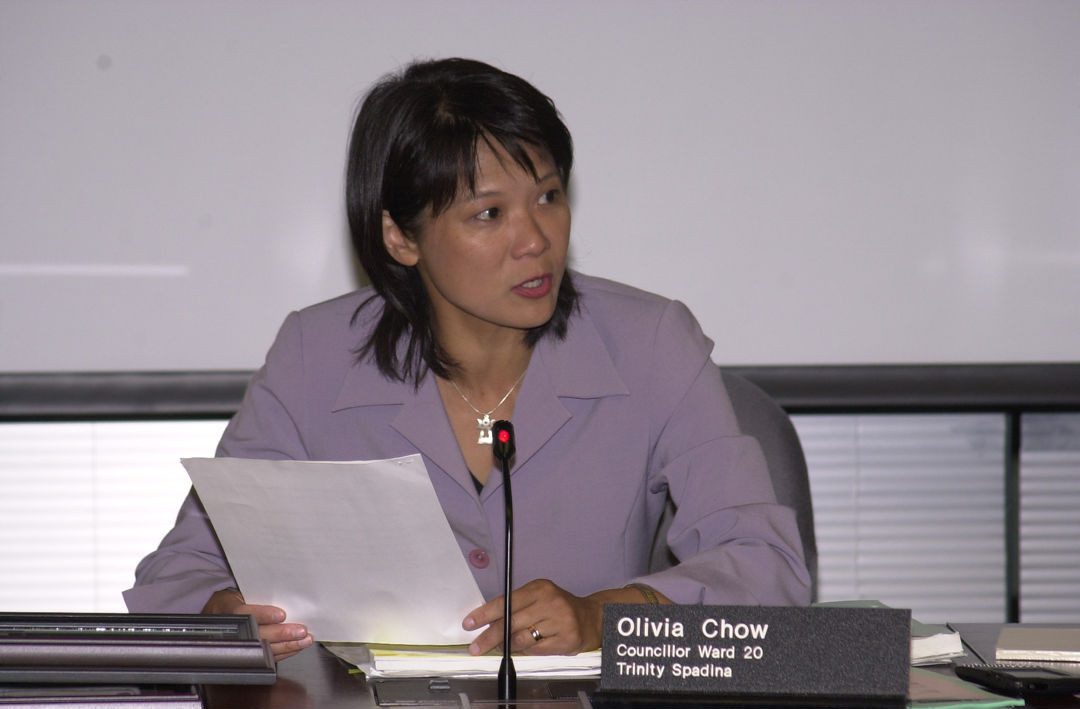
Chow speaks at an awards event in 2003.

Following the amalgamation of Metropolitan Toronto, she and her husband Jack Layton were prominent members of the city council. While sometimes critical of pro-development Mayor Mel Lastman and other suburban councillors, they worked with councillors across political lines to achieve practical progressive measures. Layton left his seat on council to become federal leader of the NDP. Both were supporters of David Miller's successful 2003 campaign to become mayor of Toronto.

Chow was forced to resign her position on the Toronto Police Services Board because, at a riot in front of the Legislative Assembly of Ontario, she informally attempted to persuade police to change their tactics. Some argued, however, that she was ousted for her outspoken attitude towards alleged police misconduct.

Chow, a cycling advocate, was renowned for her trademark bicycle, decorated with flowers and bright colours, which she rode every day to Toronto City Hall.

== Federal politics ==
In 1997, Chow ran as an NDP candidate for the House of Commons in Trinity—Spadina. Liberal incumbent Tony Ianno won by 1,802 votes, receiving 45% of the total votes.

In 2004, Chow again received the Trinity—Spadina NDP nomination for the summer federal election. With support from Jack Layton, a new urban focus of the NDP, and higher party popularity nationwide, she was widely expected to win despite some criticism from voters who elected her to a municipal seat just six months prior. She managed another strong second-place showing, but failed to unseat Ianno by only 805 votes, 1.5% of the total.

Tactical voting was blamed partially for Chow's defeat, as Liberal attack ads on Conservative Party leader Stephen Harper attempted to make the election a choice between the Liberals and Conservatives, with the effect of attracting NDP-leaning voters to support the Liberals and stave off a potential Harper government. Chow also did not resign her council seat to run federally, with some suggesting that her constituents felt comfortable voting Liberal while still having Chow around to represent them at a different level of government.

When the Liberal federal government was defeated on a motion of non-confidence, Chow resigned her city council seat of fourteen years on November 28, 2005, to make a third run at seat in the House of Commons. She was succeeded on city council on an interim basis by Martin Silva. As Silva was not allowed to run for re-election, Chow's constituency assistant Helen Kennedy ran but lost to Adam Vaughan.

On January 23, 2006, she won the Trinity—Spadina seat for the NDP in the federal election. She defeated Ianno by 3,667 votes, almost 6%. Along with Jack Layton she was part of only the second husband-and-wife team in Canadian parliamentary history to serve jointly. (Gurmant Grewal and Nina Grewal were the first, winning their seats in the 2004 Canadian federal election.)

In 2007, Chow sponsored a motion calling for Japan to apologize for forcing some 200,000 women to serve as wartime sex slaves. The motion was passed unanimously by Canada's parliament in November 2007. Chow said, "For me, this isn't crimes against 200,000 women. It's crimes against humanity and all of the world's citizens have a responsibility to speak out against it."

On June 3, 2008, Chow, "who [originally] brought in the motion", voted to implement a program which would "allow conscientious objectors ... to a war not sanctioned by the United Nations ... to ... remain in Canada". The motion gained international attention from The New York Times, the BBC and the New Zealand press. The Toronto Star reported: "[It] passed 137 to 110 ... But the motion is non-binding and the victory was bittersweet as the government (Conservative Party of Canada) is likely to ignore it." After Prime Minister Stephen Harper sought and received permission to seek a new mandate in 2008, Chow reintroduced the same motion in the 40th Canadian Parliament. The House passed it on March 30, 2009, with a vote of 129–125. Chow was instrumental in debates and actions surrounding Canada and Iraq War resisters.

In 2009, Chow introduced a private member's bill, the "Early Learning and Child Care Act" (Bill C-373), which aimed to establish a universal non-profit national childcare program.

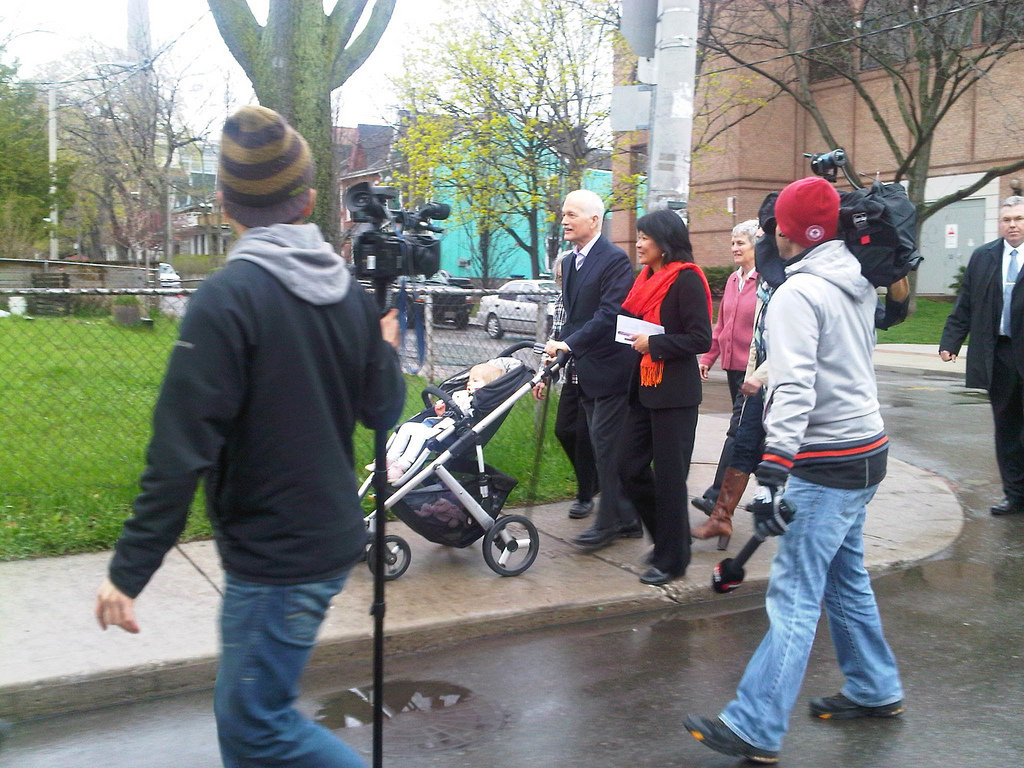
Chow walks to her polling station with her husband Jack Layton, May 2, 2011.

Chow was re-elected handily in Trinity—Spadina with a margin of more than 20,000 votes over her nearest rival, in the 2011 Canadian federal election, which saw the NDP's historic rise to Official Opposition. She was named critic for transport, infrastructure and communities in the Official Opposition Shadow Cabinet. She thus was the first serving MP to also be the spouse of a leader of the Opposition.

However, her time in Stornoway was to be short, as Jack Layton died of cancer just three months after assuming office. Chow was in the spotlight as Layton's widow during the mourning period and state funeral, winning respect for her care for her husband in his last days and for her dignity and poise in grief, and her personal and political partnerships with Layton were eulogized. She ruled out a bid for the leadership of the NDP and pledged to remain neutral in the leadership race.

On March 12, 2014, Chow resigned her seat and registered to run in the 2014 mayoral race in Toronto.

=== 2015 attempted return ===
Chow announced on July 28, 2015, that she was seeking the federal NDP nomination in Spadina—Fort York for the 2015 federal election. The new riding comprises much of the former Trinity—Spadina riding. She faced Liberal MP Adam Vaughan, who was elected MP for Trinity—Spadina in 2014 in a by-election that was held following Chow's resignation to run for mayor. Chow lost to Vaughan by a wide margin amid a Liberal sweep of Toronto ridings.

== Toronto mayoral campaigns ==
=== 2014 mayoral election ===
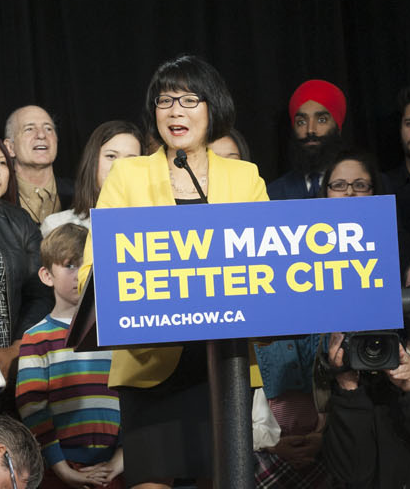
Chow speaks at a campaign event.

Chow entered the 2014 Toronto mayoral campaign in an attempt to unseat incumbent Rob Ford after most polls taken over the previous year suggested she was best placed to win either a head-to-head vote against Ford or a multi-candidate contest. Ford's mayoralty had been at the centre of several controversies during his tenure, most significantly over accusations and ultimately Ford's own admission that he had used crack cocaine as well as allegations that he has associated with criminals. Chow was the only prominent centre-left candidate running against Ford. Her other major rivals in the election, former provincial Opposition leader John Tory, councillor Karen Stintz and former budget chief David Soknacki as well as Ford himself, were all centre-right candidates.

Chow's campaign manager was John Laschinger, who previously managed David Miller's mayoral campaigns as well as federal and provincial Conservative campaigns. Former federal and provincial Liberal strategist Warren Kinsella also worked on her campaign. Other senior staff included former MuchMusic VJ Jennifer Hollett, former NDP national director Nathan Rotman, and Brian Topp, a former NDP leadership candidate. Supporters included former Ontario Liberal cabinet minister George Smitherman (who was the runner-up to Ford in the 2010 mayoral election) and filmmaker Deepa Mehta.

Chow's three priority areas were transit, children and jobs. She came out against subway expansion in favour of more buses, and building LRTs lines on Toronto's roads. She also released policies about expanding after-school recreation programs for children aged 6–11, as well as creating 5,000 jobs and training opportunities for young people through community benefits agreements.

Over the course of the election, Chow went from the polling favourite at the beginning of the campaign to eventually placing third in the election. Polls suggested she failed to capitalize on her early popularity and fell victim to strategic voting.

=== 2023 mayoral by-election ===
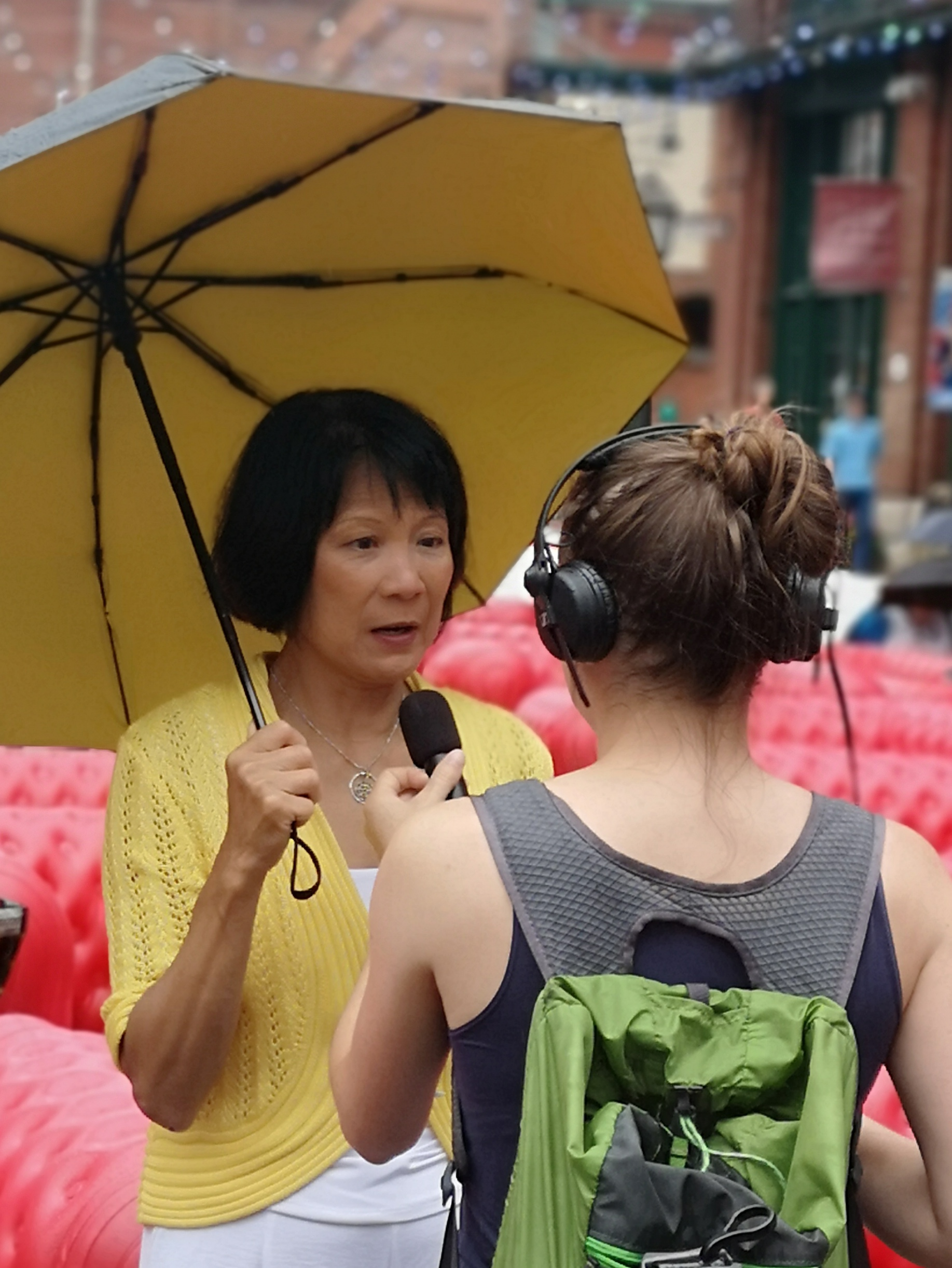
Olivia Chow at the Bastille Day 2023 celebration in Toronto.

Chow was elected as mayor of Toronto on June 26, 2023, becoming the first person of colour to be elected to a city-wide post since William Peyton Hubbard in 1904.

On April 17, 2023, Chow announced she would run for mayor of Toronto in the upcoming by-election.

Chow criticized the provincial government's controversial plan to redevelop Ontario Place into a spa and waterpark, as well as to move the Ontario Science Centre from its original site. She proposed stalling the province's plans by withholding a portion of city-owned land on the site.

Chow's housing policies include building 25,000 rent-controlled homes on city-owned land, with the city acting as a developer. She proposed increasing the vacant property tax to 3 per cent, directing funds to support affordable housing initiatives such as rent supplements, as well as increasing the land transfer tax on luxury homes, using funds to support people who are homeless. Chow also committed to opening 24/7 respite spaces and creating 1000 rent supplements. Her housing platform also includes policies aimed at supporting tenants, including combatting renovictions, doubling Toronto's rent bank, establishing a $100 million fund to purchase rental properties from private landlords and transferring them to not-for-profits, and expanding RentSafeTO, the city's building standards enforcement program.

2023 by-election results by ward

On transit, Chow proposed converting the Line 3 Scarborough corridor into a busway, once it has been decommissioned, estimated to cost $60 million with funding coming from savings realized by cancelling the Gardiner Expressway rebuild east of Cherry Street. She would reverse cuts made to the Toronto Transit Commission (TTC) in the 2023 budget and expand cell phone service on the subway system to all networks.

Chow promised to create a team to reduce 9-1-1 wait times and expand the Toronto Community Crisis Service city-wide. She supports the plan endorsed by Toronto Public Health, the Centre for Addiction and Mental Health and Toronto police chief Myron Demkiw to request a personal drug possession exemption from the federal government.

On June 26, 2023, Chow was elected as mayor of Toronto. In an election with 102 candidates, Chow won with 37% of the vote. Ana Bailão placed second with 33%.

=== 2026 mayoral election ===
On May 25, 2026, Chow formally declared her candidacy for re-election. She was challenged by Toronto city councillor Brad Bradford in the October 26 mayoral election; he previously ran against Chow in the 2023 by-election, wherein he placed eighth. Chow defeated Bradford in the 2026 race, and was re-elected mayor of Toronto with 54.16% of the vote.

She encouraged former Liberal MP Nate Erskine-Smith to run in Ward 19 Beaches—East York in the concurrent 2026 Toronto municipal election, which he did and was elected. Chow's campaign emphasized expanding tenant protections, maintaining TTC fare affordability and increasing services for seniors. She was endorsed by multiple incumbent city councillors and Liberal and NDP politicians, including Bob Rae, Kathleen Wynne, Avi Lewis, and Marit Stiles.

== Mayor of Toronto (2023–present) ==
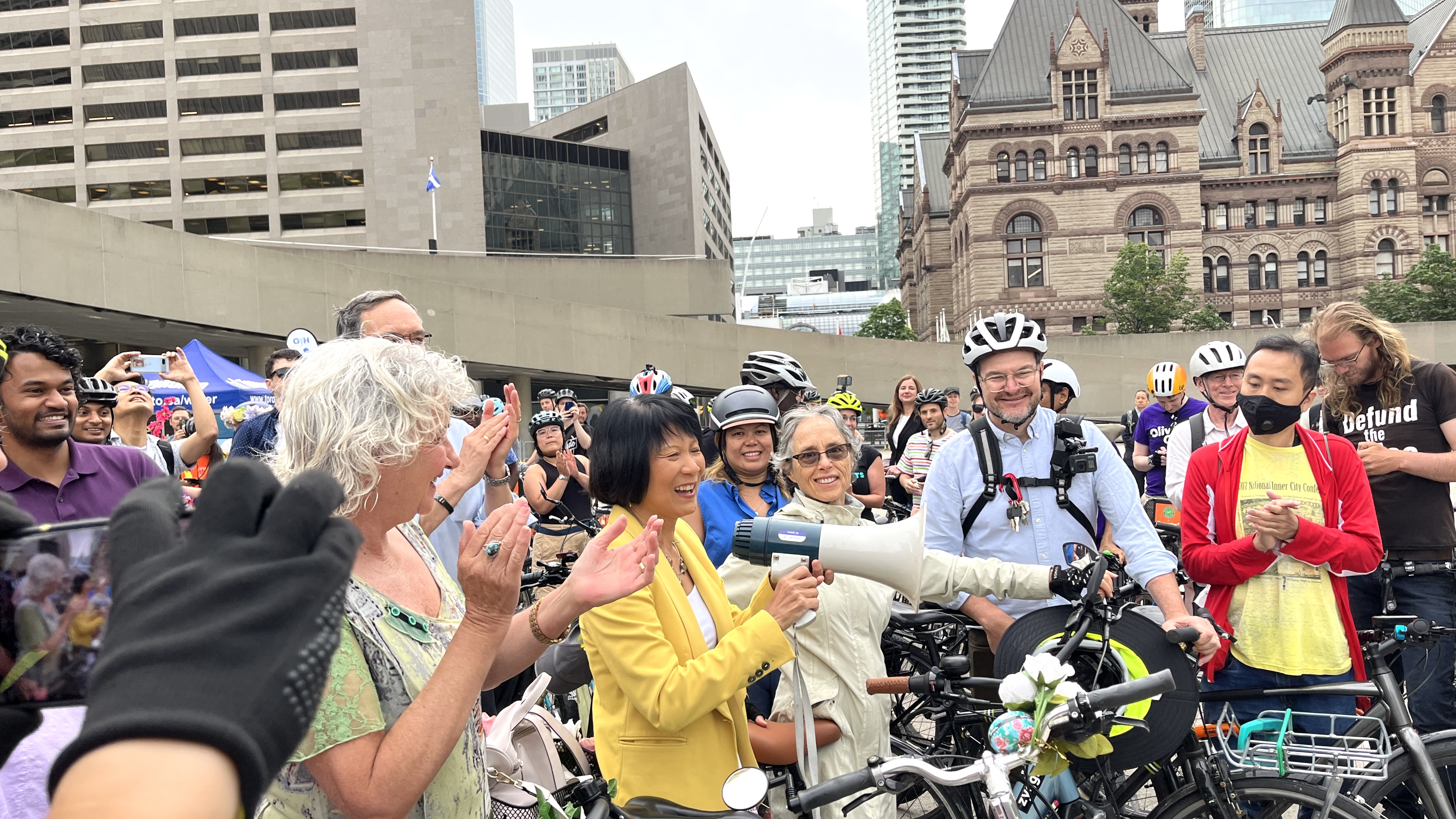
Chow arriving at City Hall for Swearing-in ceremony

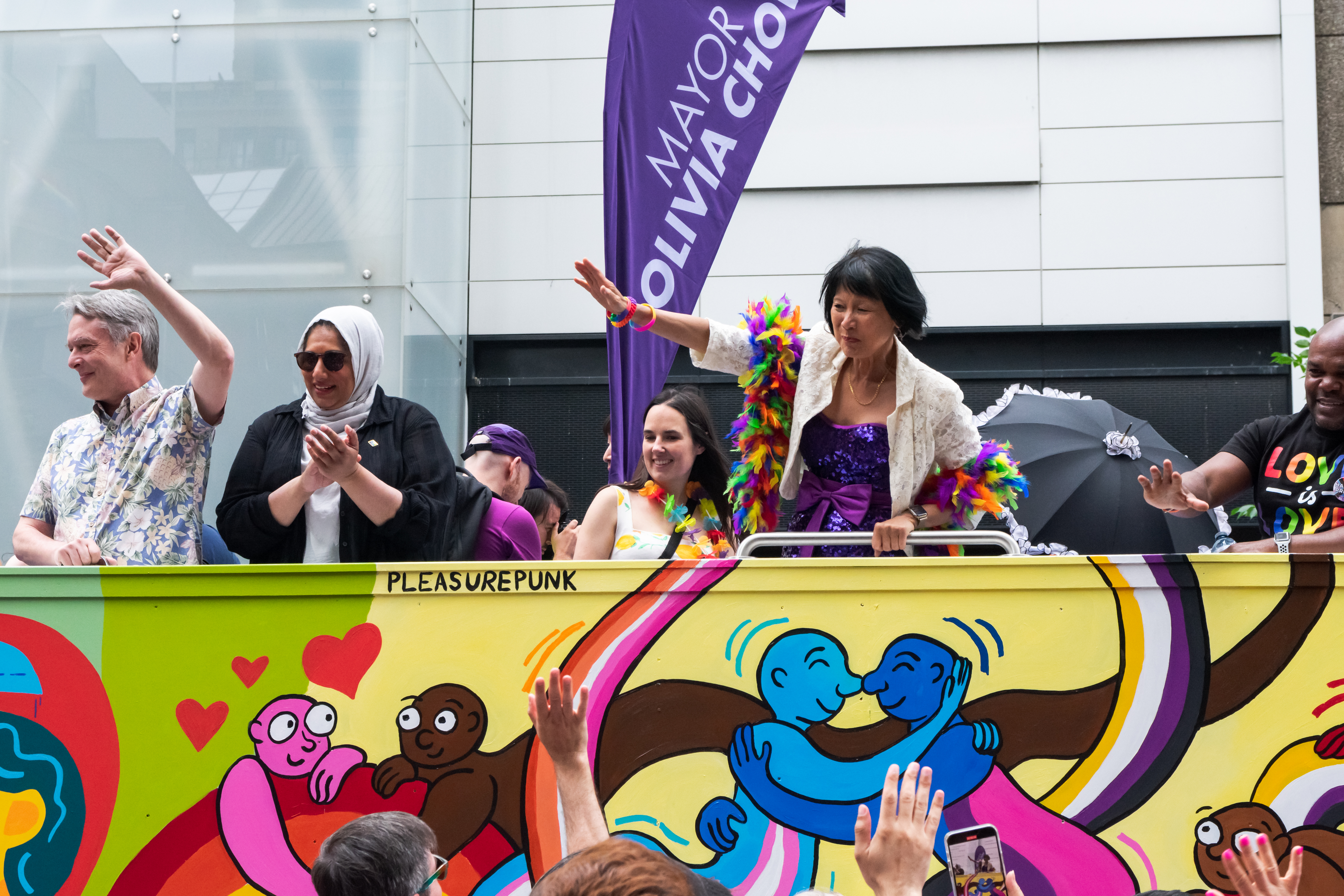
Chow at the 2024 Toronto Pride parade

Following a transition period of two weeks, Chow was sworn in as the 66th mayor of Toronto on July 12, 2023. She was sworn in for a second term on November 16, 2026.

=== Appointments ===
As mayor, Chow can appoint or dismiss the deputy mayor, heads of city divisions, the chairs and vice-chairs of council committees, as well as form the striking committee, which determines the composition of other council committees.

Just over a month into her term on August 10, 2023, Chow made a number of changes to key mayoral appointments. Ausma Malik became the statutory deputy mayor of Toronto, taking over from Jennifer McKelvie, who would continue to hold the title in an honorary capacity along with Michael Colle and Amber Morley. Chow also appointed Shelley Carroll to chair the budget committee, Gord Perks as chair of planning and housing, Jamaal Myers as chair of the TTC, and Alejandra Bravo as chair of the economic and community development committee. The Local notes that the councillors in lead roles come from progressive backgrounds, and the many progressives and centrist councillors appointed to committees have resulted in a wider political range than under the previous administration. Overall, the committee structure experienced a "leftward" shift. On December 16, 2024, she dismissed Brad Bradford from his role as vice-chair of the city's Planning and Housing Committee and replaced him with Frances Nunziata. Paul Ainslie was appointed deputy mayor for Scarborough following McKelvie's resignation from council in May 2025.

On June 5, 2025, Chow announced that former New York Metropolitan Transportation Authority executive Mandeep Lali was appointed as CEO of the TTC, succeeding Rick Leary, who resigned in August 2024. In December 2025, Chow appointed Andrew Posluns as the city's first chief congestion officer.

Following her swearing-in to a second term, Chow appointed Erskine-Smith as chair of planning and housing, Ainslie as chair of the TTC and chair of general government and service excellence, Bravo as chair of community and social services, Michael Thompson as chair of economic development and culture, and Mike Layton as chair of infrastructure and environment. She retained her incumbent deputy mayors and budget chair, Shelley Carroll.

=== Budgets and city finances ===
==== "New Deal" with the province of Ontario ====
During the 2023 by-election, the city's budget shortfall was a major topic of discussion as Toronto's 2023 operating budget faced a shortfall of $1.5 billion. Absent financial assistance from other levels of government, the city would be forced use its reserve fund in order to avoid running a deficit. Due to a decline in revenues during the COVID-19 pandemic, the City of Toronto relied on transfer payments from other levels of government to sustain its operating budget. In her first speech as mayor, Chow called on the provincial and federal governments to commit to a "new deal" for funding the city, criticizing them for withholding a bailout as the city continued to struggle from the financial impact of COVID-19.

Following her first official meeting with Premier Doug Ford on September 18, 2023, Chow and Ford announced that the city and province would form a working group of senior officials to discuss long-term sustainability and stability in Toronto's finances. Chow noted that the city was carrying $1.1 billion in services on behalf of the provincial and federal governments, while Ford committed to avoiding new taxes. On October 30, ahead of their second meeting, Chow and Ford wrote a joint letter to Prime Minister Justin Trudeau calling on the federal government to join the working group. The following day, Chow confirmed that the federal government would participate in the working group.

On November 27, 2023, Chow and Ford held a joint press conference where they announced that the city and province had come to an agreement regarding a "new deal". In the deal, the province would take over responsibility for the Gardiner Expressway and Don Valley Parkway by 2027, as well as a $300 million transfer for transit operations and safety. Contingent on federal funding, Ford also committed $758 million to procure new subway trains for Line 2 Bloor–Danforth and $600 million across three years to address homelessness. The province would also provide up $342 million over 2024, 2025 and 2026, conditional on Toronto exceeding its annual housing targets by 125 per cent each year. In total, the deal includes $1.2 billion over three years in operating funding and $7.6 billion in capital relief. Construction work on the expressway would be finished 18 months ahead of schedule, opening in late 2025. As part of the agreement, the City of Toronto also conceded that it does not have the ability to stop the province's controversial plans to redevelop Ontario Place into a private spa and water park, undoing a promise Chow made during her campaign.

==== 2024 budget ====
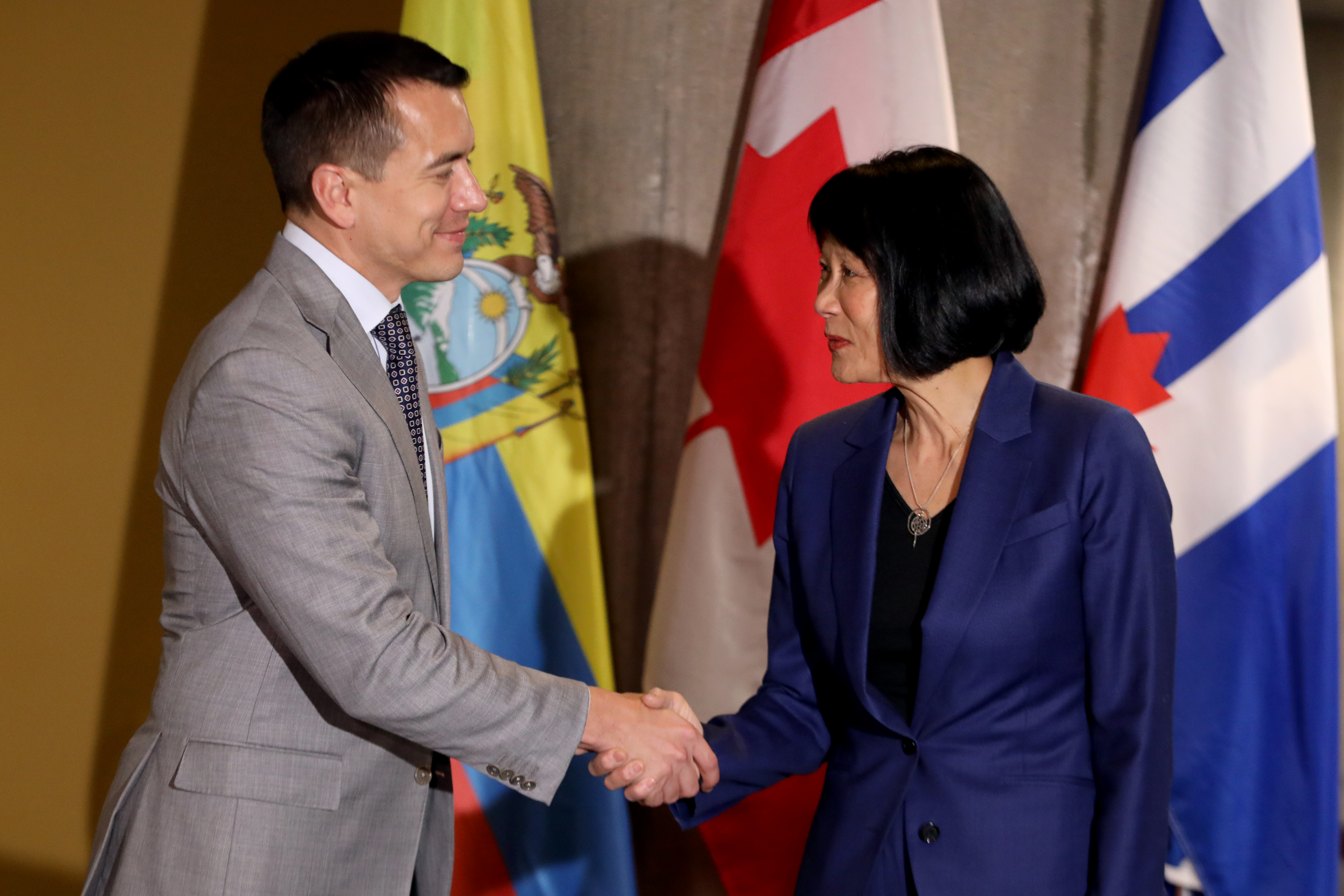
Chow (right) with the President of Ecuador Daniel Noboa (left), March 2024

On January 10, 2024, following a series of pre-budget consultations, city staff presented the Budget Committee with their proposed budget. The initial staff budget proposed a 10.5 per cent property tax increase, contingent on the federal government providing $250 million to house refugee claimants. Without federal funding, the increase could rise to 16.5 per cent. The city later decreased the proposed property tax increase to 9.5 per cent. Either tax increase would be the largest since the 1998 amalgamation of Toronto. Chow's campaign promise of converting the decommissioned Line 3 Scarborough corridor into a busway was passed by council in February, with construction completion set for 2025. In October, she announced that all 100 Toronto Public Library branches will open seven days a week by July 2026, with expanded programming and operating hours.

==== 2025 budget ====
The 2025 budget features a proposed 6.9 per cent tax hike for homeowners to help fund $18.8 billion in operating expenses, she says are aimed at improving key city services such as funding to feed 8,000 more students through school food programs. It also includes a 5.4 per cent property tax increase and the annual 1.5 per cent "city building fund" levy. In January 2025, she announced that TTC fares would be frozen for the second straight year, with Chow introducing a 5.8 per cent increase in service hours that addresses challenges such as traffic congestion. Defending the tax increases, Chow said that "this proposed budget will mean change in Torontonians' lives today". In preparation for the 2026 FIFA World Cup, Chow announced that the federal government would give BMO Field $146 million to upgrade its facilities in order to host multiple matches. The city will spend $178 million hosting the event, with the provincial government contributing $97 million. Chow has stated that the city is anticipating a budget shortfall of $40 million. In response to the second Trump tariffs, Chow announced that the city would remove Tesla from its electric vehicle incentive program, push a "buy local" initiative, remove U.S. flags from city buildings, and bar American companies from some city contracts. Crisis workers were added to a portion of Line 1 Yonge–University in November 2025, as a pilot project.

==== 2026 budget ====
The City of Toronto released the staff proposed budget for 2026 on January 8, 2026.

Operationally, the budget proposes a 1.1 per cent increase in spending and a 2.2 per cent property tax increase. Included in the budget is a $93.8 million increase for the TTC, allowing the transit agency to introduce a new fare-capping program in September. The Toronto Police Service budget is also projected to increase by $93.8 million, bringing the total police budget to $1.43 billion.

While the overall capital budget is projected to increase, $1.9 billion worth of work will be deferred due to provincial changes to development charges. Capital plans for the Parks and Recreation Division were cut by $214 million, the Toronto Public Library by $76 million and the Solid Waste Management Services Division by $6 million. The city's chief financial officer indicated that scheduled upgrades to community centres will now be months or years later than expected. The city also intends to cut the Shelter and Support Services Division's budget from $912 million to $786 million, citing reduced demand from refugee and asylum seekers, and closures of hotels the city leased for shelter spaces. Despite the reduction, shelter capacity will increase in the long-term.

Additionally, the city implemented a hiring freeze for non-essential positions.

=== Public safety and police ===
==== Crime rates ====
Chow has faced criticism from some councillors, who have characterized crime in Toronto as either rampant or increasing. In October 2025, polling suggested that crime surpassed housing as the top issue, with a Liaison study indicating that 32 per cent of respondents identify it as the city's most pressing issue.

In December 2025, analysis of data from the police department's Public Safety Data Portal indicate downward year-over-year trend across most major crime indicators. Notably, the city's 39 recorded homicides as of December 18 is less than half of the 81 in 2024, a 50-year low. Over the same period, other major crime indicators have also decreased, such as shootings declining 53.7 per cent (from 42 to 19) and stabbings declined 45.5 per cent (from 22 to 12). In a statement made to Global News, police stated, “while it’s difficult to attribute the progress to one factor, several efforts are clearly contributing”, indicating that "[f]rontline staffing, investment in community officer programs, and strong collaboration with other partners have helped in changing the trends".

In contrast, hate crimes have generally increased each year since 2019. Anti-Jewish incidents accounted for a plurality (40 per cent) of reported hate crimes in 2024, followed by anti-2SLGBTQI+ incidents.

==== Police budgets and board governance ====
Following her election in 2023, Chow appointed councillors Amber Morley and Jon Burnside, a former police officer, to the Toronto Police Service Board (TPSB).

During the 2024 budget process, the Toronto Police Service (TPS) requested a budget increase of $20 million, bringing the operating budget to $1.186 billion. Chow initially proposed a smaller increase of $12 million, which TPS management described as an "unacceptable risk" during a budget committee meeting. Chow originally indicated that additional tax increases or service cuts would be required to fully fund TPS' requested budget. However, the day before the finalized budget was to be presented to city council, Chow confirmed that TPS would receive its requested increase in full. Recently announced programs from other governments, such as federal funds to combat auto theft allowed for a further increase to the budget.

In April 2024, due to new provincial legislation disqualifying former police officers from sitting on police boards, Chow nominated Budget Chair Shelley Carroll to replace Burnside as a TPSB member. Later in June, city council moved to replace Nadine Spencer as the city's citizen member of the TPSB with Chris Brillinger.

In November 2024, TPSB member and budget chair Carroll announced with the police chief announced a five-year staffing strategy that would seek to improve the ratio of police officers per 100,000 residents. Toronto's ratio of 168 falls below the Canadian average of 178. In its next two budgets, the city would guarantee funding to send Toronto's maximum allocation to the Ontario Police College, totaling 720 police officers in the first two years, which brings the ratio to 173. Budgets for the following three years would seek to maintain the police officer to population ratio to bring it in line with other North American cities. Chow stated that the plan provides stability for the city budget and police, but urged other governments to commit additional funding. Criminology professor Scot Wortley and other critics argue that simply increasing the number of police officers does not address social conditions that produce crime.

In January 2025, Councillor Carroll was elected to be chair of the police board, while continuing in her role as budget chair.

TPS requested a $46.2 million increase during the 2025 budget process, which Chow indicated during pre-budget announcements she would prioritize. The budget was adopted in February 2025.

In April 2025, the police union and police board adopted a new collective agreement. The new agreement includes a 17.66 per cent pay increase over five years, resulting in a senior constable earning nearly $151,000 by 2029.

In September 2025, Myron Demkiw's contract as chief of the Toronto Police Service was renewed by the board for a five-year term.

==== 9-1-1 wait times and emergency response times ====
Chow campaigned on improving 9-1-1 wait times during the 2023 by-election. In August 2025, Toronto police reported the average wait time to connect with a 9-1-1 operator was 28 seconds, a 70 per cent decrease from the previous year's average of one minute and seven seconds, however, still missed the city's target of 15 seconds. Chow indicated that 60 new operators had been hired and the city expects to recruit an additional 30 by the end of the year. The city also launched a public information campaign, promoting the use of the police non-emergency number as well as the 3-1-1 and 2-1-1 hotlines for accessing municipal services and social services respectively.

In March 2025, Chow joined the police chief at a press conference announcing that the average response time for 9-1-1 calls was 12.6 minutes, an improvement from 19.6 minutes in March 2024 and 26.7 minutes in October 2023. Chow attributed the improvement to 306 recently hired police officers.

==== Bubble zone by-law ====
In May 2025, Chow supported the passing of a "bubble zone" by-law in response to the international Gaza war protests. Under the by-law, places of worship, daycares and schools can apply to the Transportation Services Division for the creation of an "access area" of 50 m (160 ft), during its hours of operations, as well as one hour before and after. Within the access area, specific behaviours are restricted such as obstructing access to the property and expressing disapproval towards a person based on race, religion or other protected grounds.

=== Housing ===
In January 2025, Chow announced that the federal, provincial, and municipal governments would provide $975 million to build 14,000 new homes near the Toronto waterfront. Previously, she announced that the city would build 7000 new rental homes and build Toronto's first affordable housing project delivered through the Public Developer Delivery model. In March 2025, the federal government announced that Toronto would receive $2.25 billion in low-cost loans to help build 4,831 rental homes, with more than 1,000 affordable units. It comes after Toronto city council passed a package of financial incentives for rental builders that includes relief from development charges and a reduction in property taxes, so long as 20 per cent of new units are rented at discounted prices. In December 2025, council approved a land transfer tax on luxury homes.

==== Encampments ====
In 2024, the city introduced a new homeless encampment response strategy, described as shifting from enforcement, towards "outreach, assistance, and information", and a "human-rights-based approach". Chow endorsed the plan as it was presented to the Economic and Community Development Committee. Under the new approach, the city prioritizes outreach and securing access to housing over enforcement. The new protocol continues to allow for the clearing of encampments, such as cases where there is a health and safety risk, and has faced criticism from activists, who note that the new protocol also allows for clearing uncooperative encampment residents.

Data from the city shows that the number of known encampments to be 70 per cent lower in 2026 compared to the previous year.

==== Sixplexes ====
In June 2025, council considered a motion to amend the zoning by-law to allow sixplex housing city-wide. The motion expands on a 2023 change to the zoning by-law to legalize building fourplexes without special approvals. The initial motion sought to upzone the entire city, which faced criticism from some suburban councillors. Councillor Jon Burnside argued that sixplexes worked better downtown than in his North York ward, and Councillor Parthi Kandavel from Scarborough described the motion as "drastic", raising concerns about accommodating parking and increasing property values. An amended motion was passed instead, only allowing sixplexes in Old Toronto, East York and Ward 23 Scarborough North. Following the decision, council passed a motion introduced by Chow in July to waive development charges (taxes paid by builders to fund infrastructure upgrades to support new developments) from sixplexes.

Federal Housing Minister Gregor Robertson later wrote Chow a letter warning that the toned down changes did not reflect the "ambition" the city committed to in its Housing Accelerator Fund (HAF) agreement with the federal government and hinted at the possibility of reduced funding if the city did not meet its targets. In her response to the minister, Chow noted that Toronto was on track to exceed its HAF targets. Chow met with Robertson in August in an attempt to ease tensions.

==== Renoviction by-law ====
With Chow's support, council passed the Rental Renovation Licence Bylaw; it requires an architect or engineer to confirm a rental unit must be vacant to perform renovations before a landlord requires a tenant to leave the unit. Should a tenant be required to leave, the landlord must offer comparable housing or pay rent-gap payments.

=== Renaming civic assets ===
==== Dundas Street and Square ====
Following her 2023 election, Chow indicated her support for the city's plan to rename Dundas Street and related civic assets. In 2020, a petition which received over 14,000 signatures calling for the renaming of the street and related civic assets prompted then-Mayor John Tory to direct city staff to begin a review of the renaming, which was subsequently adopted by city council in 2021 at a cost of $6 million. By 2023, the projected cost had risen to $13 million. Henry Dundas was a Scottish politician who is controversially known for his role in delaying the abolition of the trans-Atlantic slave trade. In December 2023, Chow supported a motion introduced by Councillor Chris Moise, which would adopt the recommendation of an advisory committee to rename Yonge–Dundas Square to Sankofa Square, a Ghanaian word describing the concept of reflecting on teachings from the past. Council also voted to rename Dundas Station after Toronto Metropolitan University (TMU), Dundas West Station and the Jane/Dundas Library. The plan would see the cost of renaming the square funded by developers through community benefit charges and the cost of renaming Dundas Station funded by TMU. The renaming of the street was deferred indefinitely due to budget pressures.

According to a poll, the name "Sankofa Square" was met unfavourably by the majority of Torontonians; in the poll, conducted in January 2024, 71 percent of respondents disapproved of the new name. Right-leaning Toronto Sun commentator Brian Lilley praised the cost savings of Chow's decision to cancel the renaming of the street, describing it as a "compromising between what she wanted and what was possible".

==== Centennial Park Stadium ====
Chow supported a motion introduced by Councillor Paul Ainslie in December 2023 to rename Centennial Park Stadium in Etobicoke after former mayor Rob Ford, who died in 2016. The motion faced opposition owing from Ford's controversial tenure as mayor, however, Chow defended her support, stating that she understood "the pain of losing a loved one" and "what that meant for the Ford family". The stadium was officially renamed Rob Ford Stadium on May 28, 2024. Chow attended the renaming ceremony along with former mayor Ford's family including his brother, Premier Doug Ford.

=== Other activities ===
In November 2025, she described the Gaza war as a genocide.

On December 16, 2025, council passed a motion to give signal priority to Line 6 Finch West and other lines, including Line 5 Eglinton.

She apologized after several outdoor swimming pools were closed by the Toronto Parks and Recreation Division amid high temperatures, which pointed to provincial requirements around staff health and safety. Chow also faced criticism for delayed snow plowing during severe weather events, which she blamed on contracts signed during the previous administration. In March 2026, council supported her motion to pay Toronto residents to shovel snow during extreme snow storms, inspired by the policies of New York City mayor Zohran Mamdani.

Chow also opposed the provincial government's removal of speed cameras and bike lane infrastructure, with her council approving more bike lanes in December 2025.

In late 2025, Chow supported a motion that ended restrictions on small businesses in detached properties on residential streets in some neighbourhoods of Toronto.

Ahead of FIFA World Cup matches in Toronto, Chow put forward a motion at council to ban United States Immigration and Customs Enforcement agents from being present in the city. She previously criticized the FIFA hosting contract signed by her predecessor, John Tory.

Chow also supported Councillor Anthony Perruzza's measure to create a city-run grocery store pilot program. In March 2026, it was announced that the municipal, provincial, and federal governments would fund the Waterfront East LRT project. Chow opposes the provincial government's plan to introduce jets at the Billy Bishop Toronto City Airport.

In May 2026, Chow was dubbed "Crolivia Chow" by Toronto-based hip-hop musician Drake, who also referred to her as his crodi, following the release of his Iceman album, which included a music video set in Toronto City Hall. Chow praised Drake for his work promoting the city.

=== Approval rating ===
Weeks after taking office, Chow had an approval rating of 73% according to Liaison Strategies. Following the release of the 2024 budget, her approval rating decreased to 55%, which was attributed to a property tax hike within the budget. In a poll taken a year after she took office, Chow had a similar approval rating of 59% among Torontonians. A Léger research poll conducted in May 2025 showed Chow with a 48% approval rating among Torontonians, with 42% disapproving of her first two years as mayor.

== Outside politics ==
Following her loss in the 2014 municipal election, Chow was appointed to a three-year term, beginning March 1, 2015, as distinguished visiting professor in the Faculty of Arts at Toronto Metropolitan University, with a focus on community engagement and democratic participation. On July 28, 2015, the university released a statement that it had agreed to grant Chow's request for a leave of absence from the university so that she could run for MP.

Chow's personal memoir, titled My Journey, was published January 21, 2014.

In 2016, Chow founded the Institute for Change Leaders, an organization affiliated with Toronto Metropolitan University which teaches political campaign and organizing skills.

== Personal life ==
Chow was married to Jack Layton from 1988 until his death in August 2011. On August 20, 2012, she unveiled a statue dedicated to Layton; tributes to him were written in English, Chinese and French. The statue is located in Harbour Square Park at the Jack Layton Ferry Terminal.

Chow is stepmother to Layton's two children from his previous marriage to Sally Halford, one of whom, Mike Layton, was a Toronto city councillor from 2010 to 2022, but then came back as a city councillor again in 2026. Chow's half-brother, Andre, lives in Seattle and is an American citizen.

In 2005, she revealed that she had undergone surgery for thyroid cancer in 2004. She decided to speak out to raise awareness of the disease. In 2013, she was diagnosed with Ramsay Hunt syndrome type II.

Chow speaks Cantonese, Mandarin and English.

She was portrayed by Sook-Yin Lee in the 2013 CBC Television film Jack. Lee won a Canadian Screen Award for her performance. In 2024, she appeared as herself, in a cameo role, on Law & Order Toronto: Criminal Intent.

Chow is a Star Trek fan, as was her husband.

=== Awards and honours ===
Chow was awarded the Queen Elizabeth Diamond Jubilee Medal in 2012.

In May 2012, Chow was named one of the top 25 Canadian immigrants in Canada by the Canadian Immigrant magazine.

Chow was voted "Best City Councillor" on numerous occasions by Toronto's alternative weeklies Now Magazine and Eye Weekly.

The Ontario Federation of Labour named an award after her, the "Olivia Chow Childcare Champion Award".

== Electoral record ==
=== Municipal ===
2026 Toronto mayoral election
Mayoral candidate	Votes	%
Olivia Chow	532,201	54.16%
Brad Bradford	404,013	41.11%
Braeden Chow	8,102	0.82%
Chris Alexander	3,550	0.36%
Edward Gong	3,443	0.35%
Laura Dean	2,224	0.23%
Darrell Brown	2,077	0.21%
Imad Abdulkadir	1,873	0.19%
Bahira Abdulsalam	1,696	0.17%
Rick Lee	1,288	0.13%
Logan Choy	1,282	0.13%
Sandeep Srivastava	1,149	0.12%
Kevin Clarke	1,089	0.11%
Georgios Kalkounis	1,085	0.11%
Roberto Curto	959	0.10%
Sarah McVie	957	0.10%
Jamie Atkinson	932	0.09%
Amy Rosen	919	0.09%
Paul Collins	845	0.09%
Lyall Sanders	784	0.08%
Mohamad Kaaki	727	0.07%
Joshua Thompson	709	0.07%
Brian Buffey	649	0.07%
Laura Ellis	630	0.06%
Michael Lamoureux	570	0.06%
Robert Shusterman	522	0.05%
Cory Deville	485	0.05%
Odessa Paloma Parker	457	0.05%
Martin Fraser	437	0.04%
Alton Frederick	432	0.04%
Heather He	421	0.04%
Mostafa Zandkarimi	396	0.04%
Faizan Haider	370	0.04%
Alex Cruze	366	0.04%
Kuo Yu Tong	366	0.04%
Habiba Desai	364	0.04%
Weizhen Tang	354	0.04%
Francis Mercieca	352	0.04%
Thomas Hall	341	0.03%
Faisal Razi	337	0.03%
Gus Prokos	327	0.03%
Jack Hartley	322	0.03%
Joseph Osuji	320	0.03%
Naomi Sayers	274	0.03%
Peter Handjis	270	0.03%
Isidoros Kyrlangitses	256	0.03%
Leila Yohannes	206	0.02%
Reagan Levermany	202	0.02%
Eddie Mayanja	193	0.02%
Wincess Dorville	175	0.02%
Henoke Yohannes	157	0.02%
Jeffery Tunney	133	0.01%
Jack Weenen	72	0.01%
Total	982,660	100%
Source: City of Toronto (unofficial results)

2023 Toronto mayoral by-election
Candidate	Votes	%
Olivia Chow	268,676	37.17
Ana Bailão	234,647	32.46
Mark Saunders	62,017	8.58
Anthony Furey	35,839	4.96
Josh Matlow	35,516	4.91
Mitzie Hunter	21,170	2.93
Chloe Brown	18,763	2.60
95 other candidates	46,249	6.39
Total	722,877	100.00
Source: City of Toronto

2014 Toronto mayoral election
Candidate	Votes	%
John Tory	394,775	40.28
Doug Ford	330,610	33.73
Olivia Chow	226,879	23.15
64 other candidates	7,913	2.84
Total	980,177	100.00
Source: City of Toronto

2000 Toronto municipal election: Ward 20 – Trinity—Spadina
Candidate	Votes
Olivia Chow	9,477
Rosie Schwartz	1,140
Roberto Verdecchia	1,126

1997 Toronto municipal election: Ward 24 – Downtown
Candidate	Votes
Olivia Chow	20,453
Kyle Rae	16,149
Al Carbone	5,186
Paul Hogan	2,319
Rosie Schwartz	2,001
Doug Lowry	1,615
Charlene Cottle	864
Roberto Verdecchia	787
Carmin Priolo	398

1994 Toronto municipal election: Metro Toronto Ward 24 – Downtown
Candidate	Votes
Olivia Chow	13,327
Jeffrey Valentine	5,940

1991 Toronto municipal election: Metro Toronto Ward 24 – Downtown
Candidate	Votes
Olivia Chow	10,024
Storm MacGregor	4,913
Michael Lockey	2,805
Larry Lee	1,836
Zoltan Fekete	1,327

=== Federal ===
2015 Canadian federal election: Spadina—Fort York
Party	Candidate	Votes	%	±%	Expenditures
Liberal	Adam Vaughan	30,141	54.66	▲30.27	–
New Democratic	Olivia Chow	15,047	27.28	▼22.36	–
Conservative	Sabrina Zuniga	8,673	15.73	▼5.13	–
Green	Sharon Danley	1,137	2.06	▼2.11	–
PACT	Michael Nicula	91	0.17	–	–
Marxist–Leninist	Nick Lin	59	0.11	–	–
Total valid votes/expense limit		55,148	100.0		$205,892.35
Total rejected ballots		268	0.48	–	
Turnout		55,416	73.93	–	
Eligible voters		74,958			
Source: Elections Canada

2011 Canadian federal election: Trinity—Spadina
Party	Candidate	Votes	%	±%	Expenditures
New Democratic	Olivia Chow	35,493	54.1	+13.2	?
Liberal	Christine Innes	15,218	23.2	−11.9	?
Conservative	Gin Siow	10,938	16.7	+2.9	?
Green	Rachel Barney	3,279	5.0	−4.0	?
Libertarian	Chester Brown	454	0.7	−0.12	?
Marxist–Leninist	Nick Lin	178	0.3	–	?
Total valid votes/expense limit		65,560	100.00	–	?
Total rejected ballots		–	–		
Turnout		65,560	68.8		

2008 Canadian federal election: Trinity—Spadina
Party	Candidate	Votes	%	±%	Expenditures
New Democratic	Olivia Chow	24,454	40.84	−5.19	$87,231
Liberal	Christine Innes	20,970	35.02	−5.12	$68,343
Conservative	Christine McGirr	8,249	13.78	+4.77	$53,815
Green	Stephen LaFrenie	5,418	9.05	+5.21	$12,333
Libertarian	Chester Brown	491	0.82	–	$0
Independent	Carlos Santos Almeida	164	0.27	–	$541
Independent	Val Illie	132	0.22	–	$580
Total valid votes/expense limit		59,878	99.44	–	$94,303
Total rejected ballots		340	0.56	+0.12	
Turnout		60,218	62.21	-8.65	
Electors on the lists		96,793			
New Democratic hold		Swing		-0.04	

2006 Canadian federal election: Trinity—Spadina
Party	Candidate	Votes	%	±%	Expenditures
New Democratic	Olivia Chow	28,748	46.03	+3.99	$78,702
Liberal	Tony Ianno	25,067	40.14	−3.41	$66,373
Conservative	Sam Goldstein	5,625	9.01	+0.36	$22,879
Green	Thom Chapman	2,398	3.84	−0.40	$165
Progressive Canadian	Asif Hossain	392	0.63	−0.37	$257
Marxist–Leninist	Nick Lin	138	0.22	+0.03	–
Canadian Action	John Riddell	82	0.13	−0.04	$25
Total valid votes		62,450	99.56		
Total rejected ballots		278	0.44	−0.17	
Turnout		62,728	70.87	+7.16	
Electors on the lists		88,515			
New Democratic gain from Liberal		Swing		+3.70	

2004 Canadian federal election: Trinity—Spadina
Party	Candidate	Votes	%	±%	Expenditures
Liberal	Tony Ianno	23,202	43.55	−4.42	$68,821
New Democratic	Olivia Chow	22,397	42.04	+6.69	$77,070
Conservative	David Watters	4,605	8.64	−4.20	$34,598
Green	Mark Viitala	2,259	4.24	–	$1,330
Progressive Canadian	Asif Hossain	531	1.00	–	$24
Marxist–Leninist	Nick Lin	102	0.19	–	$164
Canadian Action	Tristan Alexander Downe-Dewdney	91	0.17	–	N/A
Independent	Daniel Knezetic	89	0.17	–	$3,103
Total valid votes		53,276	99.39		
Total rejected ballots		329	0.61		
Turnout		53,605	63.71		
Electors on the lists		84,145			
Liberal hold		Swing		-5.55	
Note: Percentage change figures are factored for redistribution. Conservative vote is compared to the total of the Canadian Alliance vote and Progressive Conservative vote in 2000 election.

1997 Canadian federal election: Trinity—Spadina
Party	Candidate	Votes	%	±%
Liberal	Tony Ianno	18,215	45.30	−6.32
New Democratic	Olivia Chow	16,413	40.81	+14.13
Progressive Conservative	Danielle Wai Mascall	2,793	6.95	−0.97
Reform	Nolan Young	1,649	4.10	−3.75
Green	Sat Singh Khalsa	392	0.97	–
Natural Law	Ashley Deans	194	0.48	–
Independent	John Roderick Wilson	159	0.40	–
Marxist–Leninist	J.-P. Bedard	140	0.35	–
Canadian Action	Thomas P. Beckerle	130	0.32	–
Independent	Roberto Verdecchia	129	0.32	–
Total valid votes		40,214	98.99	
Total rejected ballots		410	1.01	
Turnout		40,624	67.06	
Electors on the lists		60,583		
Liberal hold		Swing		-10.23

== See also ==
- Layton family
