= Southern Journal of Philosophy =

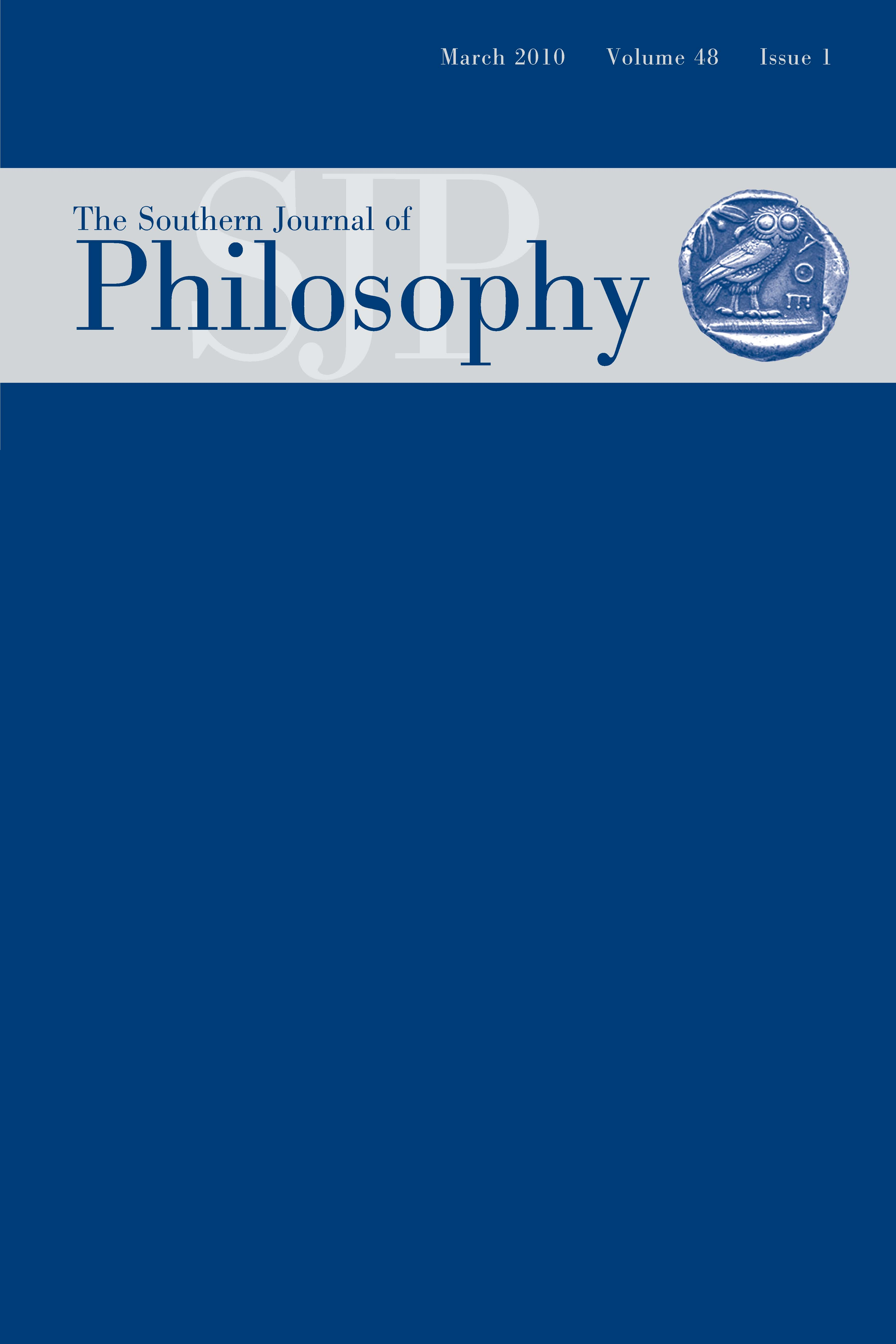
- Discipline: Philosophy
- Language: English
- Edited by: Remy Debes

Publication details
- History: 1963–present
- Publisher: Wiley-Blackwell (U.S.)
- Frequency: Quarterly + Annual Supplement (Spindel Supplement)

Standard abbreviations
- ISO 4: South. J. Philos.

Indexing
- ISSN: 0038-4283

Links
- Journal homepage; View Content Online; Editorial Board; Spindel Supplements

The Southern Journal of Philosophy has been in continuous publication since 1963. Its institutional home is the University of Memphis. The philosophy faculty there serve as editorial consultants alongside the editorial board. Remy Debes is the Editor.

== Notable articles (ordered by date of publication) ==
- "Gorgias' defense: Plato and his opponents on rhetoric and the good," by Rachel Barney (2010).
- "Moral Status as a Matter of Degree?", by David DeGrazia (2010).
- "Against Empathy," by Jesse Prinz (2011).
- "Will the Real Empathy Please Stand Up? A Case for Narrow Conceptualization," by Amy Coplan (2011).
- "Radical Predictive Processing," by Andy Clark (2015).
- "Self‐Motion and Cognition: Plato's Theory of the Soul," by Douglas R. Campbell (2021).

== See also ==
- List of philosophy journals
