= Tony Ianno =

Canadian politician

The Honourable Tony Ianno PC

Member of Parliament for Trinity—Spadina
- In office October 25, 1993 – January 23, 2006
- Preceded by: Dan Heap
- Succeeded by: Olivia Chow

Personal details
- Born: January 2, 1957 (age 69) Toronto, Ontario
- Party: Liberal
- Spouse: Christine Innes
- Children: 4
- Profession: Businessman
- Cabinet: Minister of State for Families and Caregivers (2004-2006)

Anthony "Tony" Ianno (born 1957) is a businessman and a former Canadian politician. He served as a Liberal Party of Canada MP representing Trinity—Spadina (1993–2006) and Minister of Families and Caregivers (2004–06).

== Personal life ==
Born on January 2, 1957, in Toronto, Ontario, Ianno graduated from the University of Toronto with a Bachelor of Science degree. He and his wife, Christine Innes, have four children. He is also the cousin of former Ontario MPP and cabinet minister Joseph Cordiano. His wife, Christine, was the Liberal candidate for Trinity-Spadina in the 2008 federal election and 2011 federal election.

== Politics ==
Ianno was a long-time political organizer and helped a number of Italian-Canadians win federal and provincial Liberal nominations in Toronto in the 1980s. He also was a key figure in organizing support among Toronto's large Italian-Canadian population for Jean Chrétien during the 1990 Liberal leadership campaign.

He first ran for Federal office in the 1988 election, as part of a group of four Liberals who, according to author William Johnson, "brought a new turbulence to the politics of Metro Toronto." The group, which included Joe Volpe, Armindo Silva, and Jasbir Singh, worked together and used aggressive tactics to secure nominations in the Toronto area. Ianno was nominated in the Toronto riding of Trinity-Spadina, but was defeated by New Democratic Party incumbent Dan Heap.

He ran again in the 1993 election and was elected in a Liberal sweep where they won nearly every seat in Ontario. Ianno continued to represent Trinity-Spadina for the next 13 years until he was defeated in 2006.

While most Ontario seats were easily won by the Liberals under Prime Minister Jean Chrétien, Trinity—Spadina was closely fought each time. Ianno narrowly held the diverse downtown riding through four federal elections, facing strong competition from New Democratic Party candidates. Much of his support came from the Italian, Portuguese and Chinese areas. Toronto's traditional Little Italy and Chinatown areas are in the riding. Ianno narrowly defeated Toronto city councillor Olivia Chow in the 1997 election and The Globe and Mail journalist Michael Valpy who ran for the NDP in the 2000 election. In the 2004 election, Ianno again faced councillor Chow and managed to win re-election by a slim margin, as the Liberals were reduced to a minority government due to the Sponsorship Scandal.

On July 20, 2004, Ianno was appointed to the junior position of Minister of State (Families and Caregivers) in Paul Martin's cabinet following the Liberals' re-election.

During the 2006 election, Ianno faced off against Chow for the third time. This time she defeated him, winning 46% of the vote to Ianno's 40%. Some attributed Ianno's loss to his perceived support for the Toronto Port Authority and the Toronto City Centre Airport. Although Ianno did not have an official role in the Authority's creation or policies, he nonetheless defended a controversial payout to the Authority as compensation for the cancellation of the Island Airport Bridge.

His party's proposal redress the Head Tax also did not help his campaign, as the Liberals had not consulted many of the major Canadian-Chinese groups (despite claiming to), the promised amount was reduced to from $12.5 million to $2.5 million, and the pre-condition was that the government would make no apology, while the three opposition parties pledged to make a full apology. Several gaffes by the Liberals also reflected negatively on Ianno, including when Mike Klander (the executive vice-president of the federal Liberals' Ontario wing) made posts on his blog comparing Chow to a Chow Chow dog and calling her husband an "asshole". Klander apologized for the remark and resigned.

== Later life ==
After the election, The Globe and Mail reported on February 11, 2006 that Ianno had been "burning up the caucus phone lines" testing the waters for a possible bid in the Liberal leadership campaign to replace Martin. On April 8, 2006, Mr. Ianno told Canadian Press that he decided to run for the party presidency, in which he was unsuccessful.

On March 9, 2010, the Ontario Securities Commission made allegations of market manipulation based on what they deemed "acting against public interest" against Ianno. Ianno has denied the charges. The matter was heard before the commission in September 2011. Ianno accepted a plea deal which had him pay a $100,000 fine and was banned from working as a stock trader for five years.

== Electoral record ==
1988 Canadian federal election: Trinity—Spadina
Party	Candidate	Votes	%
New Democratic	Dan Heap	15,565	38.55
Liberal	Tony Ianno	15,082	37.35
Progressive Conservative	Joe Pimentel	8,618	21.34
Libertarian	Paul Barker	494	1.22
Rhinoceros	John Douglas	444	1.10
Independent	Sukhdev S. Grewal	127	0.31
Independent	Charles Shrybman	49	0.12
Total valid votes		40,379	

1993 Canadian federal election: Trinity—Spadina
Party	Candidate	Votes	%	±%
Liberal	Tony Ianno	19,769	51.14	+13.79
New Democratic	Winnie Ng	10,430	26.98	-11.57
Progressive Conservative	Lee Monaco	3,129	8.09	-13.25
Reform	Peter Loftus	3,027	7.83	
National	Patrick Kutney	881	2.28	
Green	Chris Lea	623	1.61	
Natural Law	Ashley James Deans	391	1.01	
Libertarian	Paul Barker	283	0.73	-0.49
Marxist–Leninist	Fernand Deschamps	74	0.19	
Abolitionist	Robert Martin	52	0.13	
Total valid votes		38,659		

1997 Canadian federal election: Trinity—Spadina
Party	Candidate	Votes	%	±%
Liberal	Tony Ianno	18,215	45.30	−5.84
New Democratic	Olivia Chow	16,413	40.81	+13.83
Progressive Conservative	Danielle Wai Mascall	2,793	6.95	−1.15
Reform	Nolan Young	1,649	4.10	−3.73
Green	Sat Singh Khalsa	392	0.97	−0.64
Natural Law	Ashley Deans	194	0.48	−0.53
Independent	John Roderick Wilson	159	0.40	–
Marxist–Leninist	J.-P. Bedard	140	0.35	+0.16
Canadian Action	Thomas P. Beckerle	130	0.32	–
Independent	Roberto Verdecchia	129	0.32	–
Total valid votes		40,214	100.00	

2000 Canadian federal election: Trinity—Spadina
Party	Candidate	Votes	%	±%
Liberal	Tony Ianno	19,041	47.41	+2.11
New Democratic	Michael Valpy	15,332	38.17	-2.64
Progressive Conservative	John E. Polko	2,199	5.47	-1.48
Alliance	Lee Monaco	2,135	5.32	+1.22
Marijuana	Paul Lewin	640	1.59	
Green	Matthew Hammond	533	1.33	+0.36
Marxist–Leninist	Nick Lin	101	0.25	-0.10
Natural Law	Ashley Deans	96	0.24	-0.24
Communist	Jesse Benjamin	88	0.22	
Total valid votes		40,165		
Note: Canadian Alliance vote is compared to the Reform vote in 1997 election.				

2004 Canadian federal election: Trinity—Spadina
Party	Candidate	Votes	%	±%	Expenditures
Liberal	Tony Ianno	23,202	43.55	−3.86	$68,821
New Democratic	Olivia Chow	22,397	42.04	+3.87	$77,070
Conservative	David Watters	4,605	8.64	−2.15	$34,598
Green	Mark Viitala	2,259	4.24	+2.91	$1,330
Progressive Canadian	Asif Hossain	531	1.00	–	$24
Marxist–Leninist	Nick Lin	102	0.19	−0.06	$164
Canadian Action	Tristan Alexander Downe-Dewdney	91	0.17	–	N/A
Independent	Daniel Knezetic	89	0.17	–	$3,103
Total valid votes		53,276	100.00		
Total rejected ballots		329	0.61		
Turnout		53,605	63.7		
Note: Conservative vote is compared to the total of the Canadian Alliance vote and Progressive Conservative vote in 2000 election.

2006 Canadian federal election: Trinity—Spadina
Party	Candidate	Votes	%	±%	Expenditures
New Democratic	Olivia Chow	28,748	46.03	+3.99	$78,702
Liberal	Tony Ianno	25,067	40.14	−3.41	$66,373
Conservative	Sam Goldstein	5,625	9.01	+0.36	$22,879
Green	Thom Chapman	2,398	3.84	−0.40	$165
Progressive Canadian	Asif Hossain	392	0.63	−0.37	$257
Marxist–Leninist	Nick Lin	138	0.22	+0.03	–
Canadian Action	John Riddell	82	0.13	−0.04	$25
Total valid votes		62,450	100.00		
Total rejected ballots		278	0.44	−0.17	
Turnout		62,728	70.9	+7.2	
