= Trinity—Spadina (federal electoral district) =

Former federal electoral district in Ontario, Canada

Coordinates: 43.650°N 79.406°W

Ontario electoral district
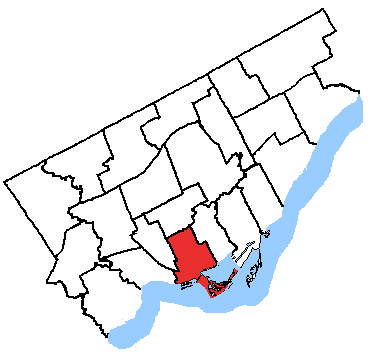
- Trinity—Spadina in relation to the other Toronto ridings (2003 boundaries)

Defunct federal electoral district
- Legislature: House of Commons
- District created: 1987
- District abolished: 2013
- First contested: 1988
- Last contested: 2014
- District webpage: profile, map

Demographics
- Population (2011): 144,733
- Electors (2011): 96,793
- Area (km²): 18.55
- Census division: Toronto
- Census subdivision: Toronto

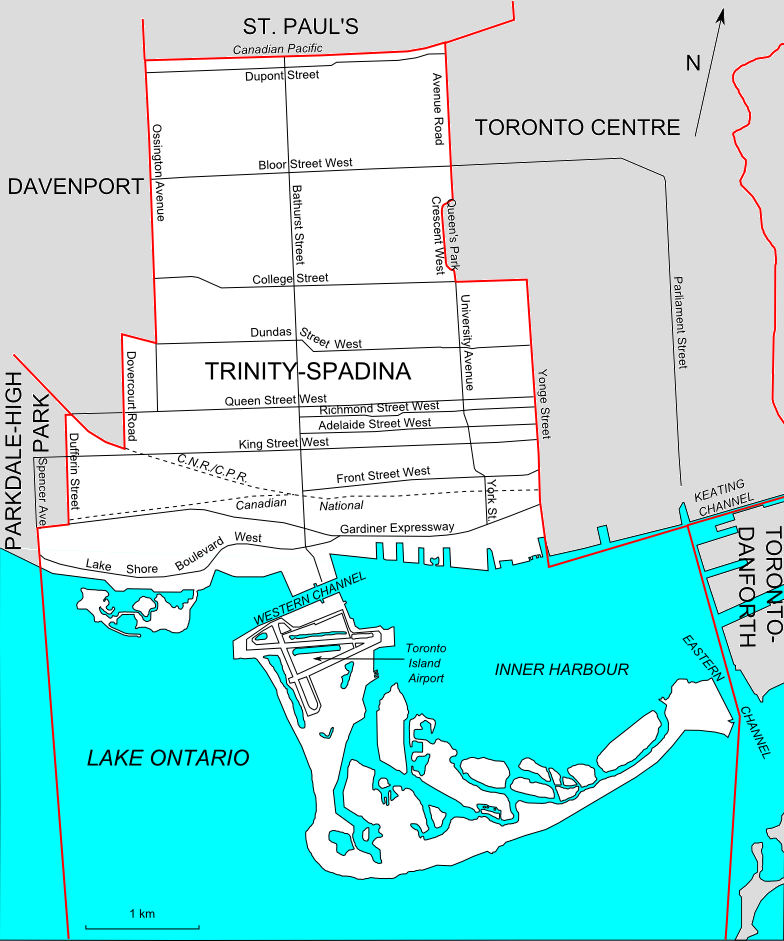
Map of Trinity-Spadina

Trinity—Spadina was a federal electoral district in Ontario, Canada, that was represented in the House of Commons of Canada from 1988 to 2015.

It generally encompassed the western portion of Downtown Toronto.

The riding was a battle ground between the NDP and the Liberals.

Major landmarks within the riding included the western portion of the University of Toronto, the CN Tower, Rogers Centre (formerly Skydome), Air Canada Centre, the Canadian Broadcasting Centre, 299 Queen Street West, the Toronto Eaton Centre, the Metro Toronto Convention Centre, Toronto City Hall, Kensington Market, Chinatown, Christie Pits, Trinity Bellwoods Park, the southern portion of Bay Street and Palmerston Boulevard.

The riding contained Toronto's Chinatown, Koreatown, Little Italy, and Little Portugal. The northern section of the riding was the Annex district, while the eastern edge contained part of the University of Toronto and thousands of students.

== Demographics ==
According to the 2011 Canadian census
Average household income (2010): $86,895
Median household income (2010): $60,659
Median income (2010): $34,761
Unemployment: 7.3%
Language, mother tongue (2011): English 61.2%, Chinese 13.0%, Portuguese 4.4%, French 2.8%, Spanish 2.1%, Italian 1.8%, Korean 1.4%, Arabic 1.4%
Religion (2011): Christian 42.9% (Catholic 24.4%, Anglican 3.6%, Christian Orthodox 2.5%, United Church 2.5%, Presbyterian 1.3%, Other 8.3%), Muslim 4.2%, Jewish 4.1%, Buddhist 3.4%, Hindu 1.8%, No religion 42.5%.
Ethnic groups (2011): White 61.8%, Chinese 16.0%, South Asian 5.1%, Black 3.6%, Korean 1.8%, Filipino 1.8%, Latin American 1.7%, Southeast Asian 1.7%, Arab 1.6%, West Asian 1.1%

== Geography ==
It consists of the Toronto Islands and the part of the City of Toronto bounded on the south by Toronto Harbour, and on the west, north and east by a line drawn from the harbour north on Spencer Avenue, east along the Gardiner Expressway, north on Dufferin, east on Queen Street West, southeast along the Canadian Pacific Railway line, north along Dovercourt Road, east along Dundas Street West, north along Ossington Avenue, east along the Canadian Pacific Railway situated north of Dupont Street, south along Avenue Road and Queens Park Crescent West, east along College Street and south along Yonge Street to the harbour.

These borders were somewhat changed in the 2004 redistribution. The northwestern corner, a somewhat pro-NDP area was lost to Davenport. A large, but mostly business area of Toronto Centre—Rosedale between University Avenue and Yonge St. was given to the riding. This region tends to support the Liberals. The Toronto Islands were also added to the riding from Toronto Centre—Rosedale. This area is very strongly NDP and has a highly activist population that provides many campaign workers for the New Democrats.

== History ==
The riding was created in 1987 from Trinity and Spadina, and smaller parts of Toronto Centre—Rosedale and Parkdale—High Park.

It consisted initially of the part of the City of Toronto bounded on the south by Toronto Harbour, on the east by Avenue Road, Queen's Park Crescent West, University Avenue and York Street, and on the west and north by a line drawn from the harbour north along Spencer Avenue, east along the Gardiner Expressway, north along Atlantic Avenue, southeast along the Canadian National Railway line, north along Dovercourt Road, east along Bloor Street West, north along Ossington Avenue, and east along the Canadian Pacific Railway line to Avenue Road.

In 2003, it was given its current boundaries as described above.

As per 2012 federal electoral boundaries redistribution and the 2013 representation order, Trinity—Spadina was dissolved following the conclusion of the next general election to be called after May 1, 2014. Most of the riding's territory, covering the area south of Dundas Street, became the new riding of Spadina—Fort York. The area north of Dundas and west of a line following Bay Street and Front Street became part of the new seat of University—Rosedale, while the area east of Bay Street and north of Front Street became part of Toronto Centre.

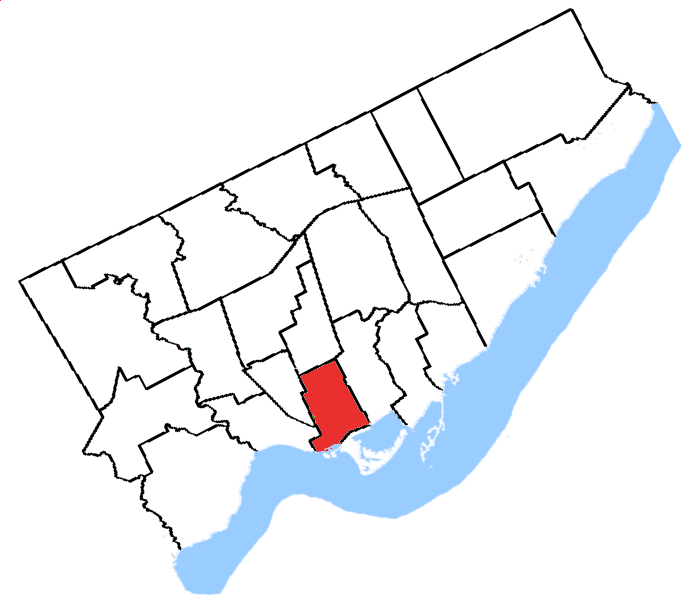
Trinity—Spadina from when it was first created to 1996

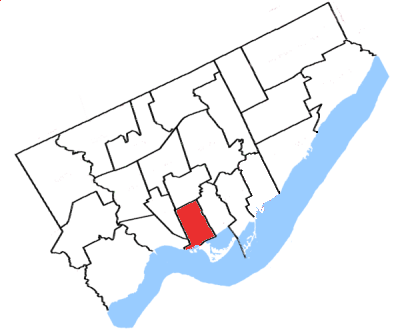
The boundaries in place from 1996 to 2003

=== Members of Parliament ===
This riding has elected the following members of the House of Commons of Canada:

Parliament	Years	Member	Party
Trinity—Spadina; Riding created from Trinity, Spadina, Toronto Centre—Rosedale, and Parkdale—High Park
34th	1988–1993	Dan Heap	New Democratic
35th	1993–1997	Tony Ianno	Liberal
36th	1997–2000	Tony Ianno	Liberal
37th	2000–2004	Tony Ianno	Liberal
38th	2004–2006	Tony Ianno	Liberal
39th	2006–2008	Olivia Chow	New Democratic
40th	2008–2011	Olivia Chow	New Democratic
41st	2011–2014	Olivia Chow	New Democratic
41st	2014–2015	Adam Vaughan	Liberal
Riding dissolved into Spadina—Fort York, University—Rosedale, and Toronto Centre

The seat became vacant on March 12, 2014, when Olivia Chow resigned in order to run in the Toronto mayoral election.

== Election results ==
=== 2014 by-election ===
Canadian federal by-election, June 30, 2014 Resignation of Olivia Chow
Party	Candidate	Votes	%	±%
Liberal	Adam Vaughan	18,547	53.66	+30.27
New Democratic	Joe Cressy	11,802	34.14	−20.37
Conservative	Benjamin Sharma	2,022	5.85	−10.96
Green	Camille Labchuk	1,880	5.44	+1.06
Christian Heritage	Linda Groce-Gibbons	174	0.50	–
Independent	John "The Engineer" Turmel	141	0.41	–
Total valid votes/expense limit		34,566	99.68	–
Total rejected ballots		111	0.32	−0.14
Turnout		34,677	31.45	−33.50
Eligible voters		110,252		
Liberal gain from New Democratic		Swing		+25.32
By-election due to the resignation of Olivia Chow to run in the 2014 Toronto mayoral election.
Source: Elections Canada

=== 2011 election ===
2011 Canadian federal election
Party	Candidate	Votes	%	±%
New Democratic	Olivia Chow	35,601	54.51	+13.67
Liberal	Christine Innes	15,276	23.39	-11.63
Conservative	Gin Siow	10,976	16.81	+3.03
Green	Rachel Barney	2,861	4.38	-4.67
Libertarian	Chester Brown	456	0.70	-0.12
Marxist–Leninist	Nick Lin	140	0.21	–
Total valid votes		65,310	99.54	
Total rejected ballots		301	0.46	-0.11
Turnout		65,611	64.95	+2.74
Eligible voters		101,020	–	–
New Democratic hold		Swing		+12.65

=== 2008 election ===
2008 Canadian federal election
Party	Candidate	Votes	%	±%	Expenditures
New Democratic	Olivia Chow	24,454	40.84	−5.19	$87,231
Liberal	Christine Innes	20,970	35.02	−5.12	$68,343
Conservative	Christine McGirr	8,249	13.78	+4.77	$53,815
Green	Stephen LaFrenie	5,418	9.05	+5.21	$12,333
Libertarian	Chester Brown	491	0.82	–	$0
Independent	Carlos Santos Almeida	164	0.27	–	$541
Independent	Val Illie	132	0.22	–	$580
Total valid votes/expense limit		59,878	99.44	–	$94,303
Total rejected ballots		340	0.56	+0.12	
Turnout		60,218	62.21	-8.65	
Electors on the lists		96,793			
New Democratic hold		Swing		-0.04	

=== Prior elections ===
2006 Canadian federal election
Party	Candidate	Votes	%	±%	Expenditures
New Democratic	Olivia Chow	28,748	46.03	+3.99	$78,702
Liberal	Tony Ianno	25,067	40.14	−3.41	$66,373
Conservative	Sam Goldstein	5,625	9.01	+0.36	$22,879
Green	Thom Chapman	2,398	3.84	−0.40	$165
Progressive Canadian	Asif Hossain	392	0.63	−0.37	$257
Marxist–Leninist	Nick Lin	138	0.22	+0.03	–
Canadian Action	John Riddell	82	0.13	−0.04	$25
Total valid votes		62,450	99.56		
Total rejected ballots		278	0.44	−0.17	
Turnout		62,728	70.87	+7.16	
Electors on the lists		88,515			
New Democratic gain from Liberal		Swing		+3.70	

2004 Canadian federal election
Party	Candidate	Votes	%	±%	Expenditures
Liberal	Tony Ianno	23,202	43.55	−4.42	$68,821
New Democratic	Olivia Chow	22,397	42.04	+6.69	$77,070
Conservative	David Watters	4,605	8.64	−4.20	$34,598
Green	Mark Viitala	2,259	4.24	–	$1,330
Progressive Canadian	Asif Hossain	531	1.00	–	$24
Marxist–Leninist	Nick Lin	102	0.19	–	$164
Canadian Action	Tristan Alexander Downe-Dewdney	91	0.17	–	N/A
Independent	Daniel Knezetic	89	0.17	–	$3,103
Total valid votes		53,276	99.39		
Total rejected ballots		329	0.61		
Turnout		53,605	63.71		
Electors on the lists		84,145			
Liberal hold		Swing		-5.55	
Note: Percentage change figures are factored for redistribution. Conservative vote is compared to the total of the Canadian Alliance vote and Progressive Conservative vote in 2000 election.

2000 federal election redistributed results
Party	Vote	%
Liberal	20,332	47.97
New Democratic	11,984	35.35
Progressive Conservative	2,829	6.97
Canadian Alliance	2,614	6.17
Others	1,625	3.83

2000 Canadian federal election
Party	Candidate	Votes	%	±%
Liberal	Tony Ianno	20,032	47.56	+2.27
New Democratic	Michael Valpy	16,001	37.99	-2.82
Progressive Conservative	John E. Polko	2,309	5.48	-1.46
Alliance	Lee Monaco	2,250	5.34	+1.24
Marijuana	Paul Lewin	673	1.60	
Green	Matthew Hammond	562	1.33	+0.36
Marxist–Leninist	Nick Lin	102	0.24	-0.11
Natural Law	Ashley Deans	98	0.23	-0.25
Communist	Jesse Benjamin	90	0.21	
Total valid votes		42,117	99.47	
Total rejected ballots		224	0.53	-0.48
Turnout		42,341	57.88	-9.17
Electors on the lists		73,147		
Liberal hold		Swing		+2.54
Note: Canadian Alliance vote is compared to the Reform vote in 1997 election.				

1997 Canadian federal election
Party	Candidate	Votes	%	±%
Liberal	Tony Ianno	18,215	45.30	−6.32
New Democratic	Olivia Chow	16,413	40.81	+14.13
Progressive Conservative	Danielle Wai Mascall	2,793	6.95	−0.97
Reform	Nolan Young	1,649	4.10	−3.75
Green	Sat Singh Khalsa	392	0.97	–
Natural Law	Ashley Deans	194	0.48	–
Independent	John Roderick Wilson	159	0.40	–
Marxist–Leninist	J.-P. Bedard	140	0.35	–
Canadian Action	Thomas P. Beckerle	130	0.32	–
Independent	Roberto Verdecchia	129	0.32	–
Total valid votes		40,214	98.99	
Total rejected ballots		410	1.01	
Turnout		40,624	67.06	
Electors on the lists		60,583		
Liberal hold		Swing		-10.23

1993 federal election redistributed results
Party	Vote	%
Liberal	20,882	51.61
New Democratic	10,795	26.68
Progressive Conservative	3,201	7.91
Reform	3,175	7.85
Others	2,406	5.95

1993 Canadian federal election
Party	Candidate	Votes	%	±%
Liberal	Tony Ianno	19,769	51.14	+13.79
New Democratic	Winnie Ng	10,430	26.98	-11.57
Progressive Conservative	Lee Monaco	3,129	8.09	-13.25
Reform	Peter Loftus	3,027	7.83	
National	Patrick Kutney	881	2.28	
Green	Chris Lea	623	1.61	
Natural Law	Ashley James Deans	391	1.01	
Libertarian	Paul Barker	283	0.73	-0.49
Marxist–Leninist	Fernand Deschamps	74	0.19	
Abolitionist	Robert Martin	52	0.13	
Total valid votes		38,659		

1988 Canadian federal election
Party	Candidate	Votes	%
New Democratic	Dan Heap	15,565	38.55
Liberal	Tony Ianno	15,082	37.35
Progressive Conservative	Joe Pimentel	8,618	21.34
Libertarian	Paul Barker	494	1.22
Rhinoceros	John Douglas	444	1.10
Independent	Sukhdev S. Grewal	127	0.31
Independent	Charles Shrybman	49	0.12
Total valid votes		40,379	

== See also ==
- List of Canadian electoral districts
- Historical federal electoral districts of Canada
