= Mayoralty of Rob Ford =

2010–2014 term of Toronto mayor

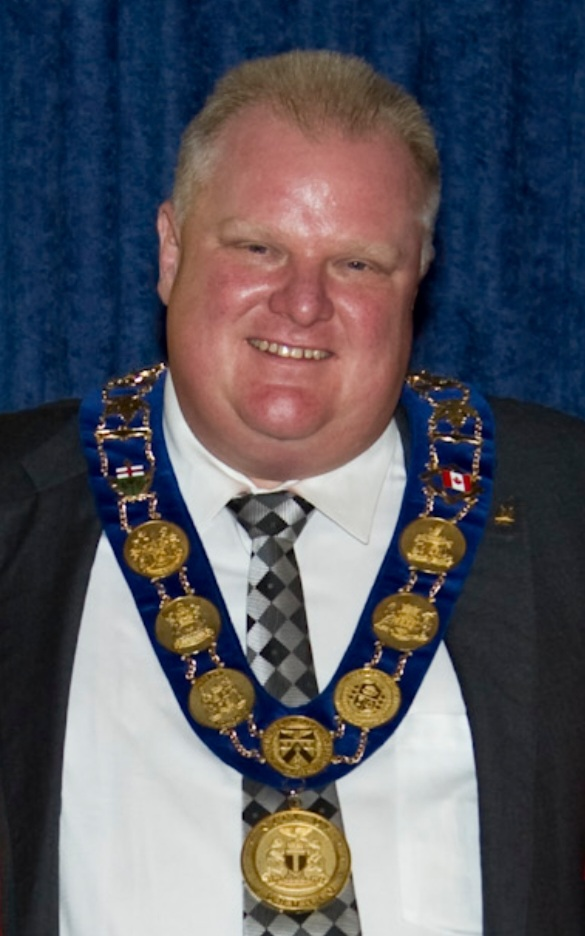
- Mayoralty of Rob Ford; December 1, 2010 – November 30, 2014
- Mayor: Rob Ford
- Party: Independent
- Election: 2010
- Seat: Toronto City Hall

Rob Ford served as mayor of Toronto, Ontario, Canada for one term from December 1, 2010, until November 30, 2014, being elected in 2010. As a Conservative-leaning mayor, his term was a period of conflict with the rest of Toronto City Council over budget spending, traffic, transit, cycling and other issues. During his term as mayor, he was embroiled in a scandal over his drug and alcohol abuse, leading Council to remove some of his powers as mayor. The drug scandal created headlines nationally and internationally as Ford denied his abuse until a video was found of him smoking crack cocaine. Ford then took a two-month leave of absence for rehabilitation. He declined to run again for mayor for a second term due to a cancer diagnosis.

== Overview ==
Rob Ford was elected mayor with 383,501 votes (47%) over George Smitherman's 289,832 (35.6%) and Joe Pantalone with 95,482 (11.7%). The voter turnout was around 52% of registered voters, the highest in Toronto's post-amalgamation history. Ward-by-ward electoral results showed that Ford had won all of the former pre-amalgamation suburbs, while Smitherman topped districts in the pre-amalgamation Toronto districts. Ford also received 80,000 votes from the "Downtown 13" wards, or 20% of his total votes.

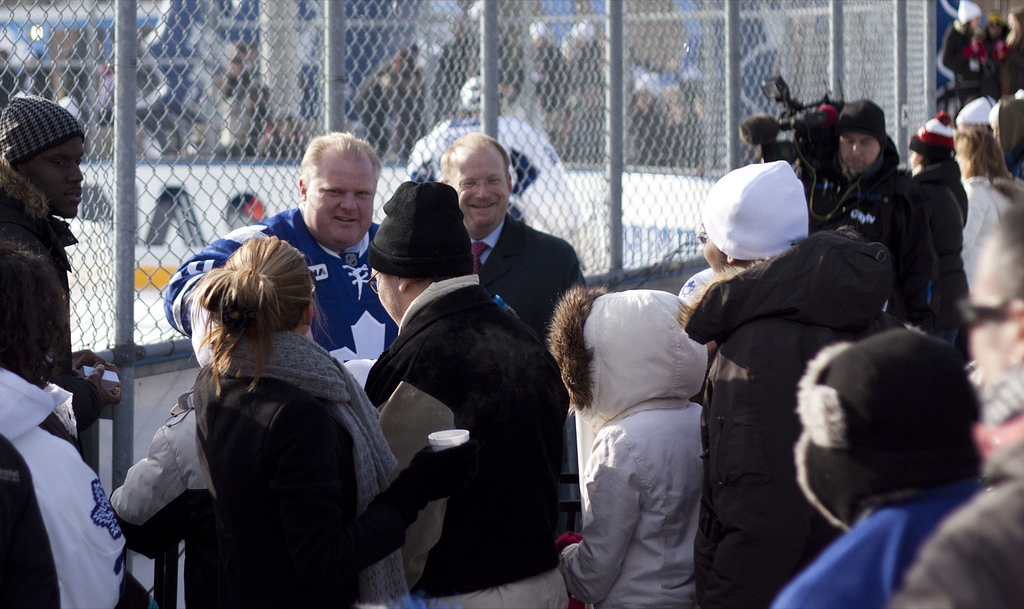
Ford at a Toronto Maple Leafs practice in Trinity Bellwoods Park, 2010

After the election, Ford had outgoing councillor Case Ootes, a former City of Toronto budget chief, head the "transition team." From his campaign team, Ford named Nick Kouvalis as his chief of staff; Mark Towhey, who had drafted his campaign platform, as his policy advisor; and Adrienne Batra, his communications advisor, as press secretary. Councillor Doug Holyday, who had helped elect Doug Ford Sr., was named deputy mayor. For the executive committee of City Council, Ford named councillors who had endorsed him in his campaign. For the inauguration ceremony at the first meeting of the new council, Ford had television commentator Don Cherry introduce him and put the chain of office on him. Cherry garnered some controversy with his remarks. Cherry described how Ford had reversed a mistake of city staff cutting down a tree of a Toronto property owner for no good reason and then billing the property owner, who suffered from Alzheimer's. Cherry added "Put that in your pipe you left-wing kooks" and, in regards to the pink suit he was wearing, "I'm wearing pinko for all the pinkos out there that ride bicycles and everything, I thought I'd get it in."

During his term as mayor, Ford was involved in several publicized incidents while driving, including reading while driving on the Gardiner Expressway, and talking on his cell phone while driving. In another driving incident, Ford passed the rear door of a streetcar, while the front door was open, leading to "an exchange of words with the streetcar operator." After the August 2012 incident of reading while driving, Ford was criticized by the media, other mayors and safety advocates. The Toronto Police and Rob's brother Doug Ford both urged him to hire a driver. As mayor, Ford was entitled to a personal driver and car paid for by the city, but Ford repeatedly turned down the benefit on the grounds that he did not want taxpayers to pay for the extra cost. Similarly, while a councillor, Ford had disagreed with the city giving councillors free TTC passes and fought for the eventual repeal of the perk on the same basis.

Mayor Ford was the focus of further controversy when, according to a report in the Toronto Star, he personally asked city officials to approve drainage and road repairs outside the Deco Labels and Tags headquarters building before its 50th anniversary party in August 2012. Critics such as Councillor Adam Vaughan stated "This is a clear-cut example of using one's office to gain preferential treatment for private interests." Ford stated that he had made thousands of such requests on behalf of homeowners and other businesses. "Someone has a pothole in front of their house, in front of their business, I go out and fix it. Just like I did for our company."

The Ombudsman for the City of Toronto, Fiona Crean, published a report in September 2012 suggesting that Mayor Ford's office had "compromised" the civic appointments process for city boards and agencies. Crean and her report was questioned by Council while Rob Ford remained silent, instead choosing to respond later on a radio talk show by stating: "When people are just going to make up stories about you, why are you even going to try to defend yourself when you know it's just a bunch of malarkey." The Ombudsman and the existence of the position itself were later criticized by Ford and became the subject of further debate. In October, Mayor Ford said he wanted to eliminate three watchdog positions: that of the Ombudsman, the Integrity Commissioner and the lobbyist registrar. "You don't need a lobbyist registry, an ombudsman and an integrity commissioner. They have 20 people; they're tripping over themselves. They're trying to make themselves look busy." All three positions are required under Ontario law and were established after the MFP computer leasing scandal inquiry.

His brother Doug has stated that Rob wrote "numerous" reference letters for criminals, including tow-truck driver and convicted murderer Douglas Sedgewick, and his occasional driver Alexander "Sandro" Lisi, accused of threatening to kill a woman.

In a November 2013 meeting of the Toronto City Council, Ford ran through the council chamber and accidentally ran over city councilmember Pam McConnell. McConnell's injuries required physiotherapy.

On April 2, 2014, Mayor Ford cast the only opposition votes for motions to honor Canadian Olympic Athletes and to name a street after the late Nelson Mandela. He later asked for a revote but was denied. He later stated that "we all make errors" and that he pushed the wrong button due to stretching his sore back, due to having hurt it lifting weights the prior Friday. His brother, Councillor Doug Ford, stated that, in reference to the Mandela motion, there was no bigger supporter of the Black community in Toronto than Mayor Ford.

== Budgets ==
At its first meeting in December 2010, council voted to cancel the annual $60 personal vehicle registration tax passed by the previous council. The tax cancellation, a campaign promise of Ford's, took effect on January 1, 2011. For the first budget, which was for 2011, the budget was balanced with no tax increases and no significant changes. The budget used a surplus from 2010 and reserve funds to avoid raising taxes. A proposed TTC fare increase was cancelled after Ford objected to it and "found" $16 million to cover their operating shortfall.

Prior to the 2012 budget, the Ford administration initiated a consultant review of the services provided by the city. The study included public consultation websites and public 'town hall' meetings. Participants were asked to group services as 'necessary', 'nice to have', etc. and asked how to expect to pay for them. Ford himself suggested that the city get out of running several venues it owns, including the Sony Centre, selling off the Toronto Zoo and closing other zoos run by the City of Toronto. Ford's team promoted a figure of over $700 million as the projected shortfall with no new taxes or cuts made. The budget as proposed by Ford included cuts to various services, including environmental programs, libraries, parks and recreation, and social services, while increasing property tax by 2%, TTC fares and user fees, including those of sports teams of city facilities. This was in contrast to Ford's election campaign, when Ford had promised to find savings at City Hall without cuts to services. Two public meetings held at City Hall turned into overnight marathons with hundreds of citizens, labour groups and special interest groups protesting the various cuts. The budget was revised at council to restore over $18 million of spending and send the administration of the Toronto Zoo and the venues for further study. Three smaller zoos were given deadlines of June 2012 to find other funding or close. Later in 2012, the increases in sports teams' user fees was postponed until 2013. In April 2012, it was found that the city was running a surplus of nearly $270 million for 2011, attributed to greater-than-expected land transfer tax revenues amid a booming real estate development market. In October 2012, Toronto Council voted to cancel plans to get expressions of interest from potential buyers of the Toronto Zoo.

In 2013, the city budget increased to $9.4 billion for operating expenses and $2.27 billion for capital projects. Unlike previous years, the budget did not use prior-year surplus monies to balance the budget; individual departmental budgets were reduced by $187 million and projected revenues increased by $251 million. The 2012 year-end surplus was used for TTC vehicle purchases and other projects not already budgeted for. As in previous years, taxes increased, including an increase of 2.0% on property taxes, 0.67% on business taxes and a 5 cent increase to TTC fares. Ford supported the budget produced by the Council budget committee, stating that "this budget improves services, lowers our debt, keeps taxes affordable and is based on sustainable spending." At the Council meeting to approve the budget, Ford surprised other members of the executive committee by first voting to freeze taxes, before supporting the 2% increase as proposed.

== Labour relations ==
As part of Ford's campaign promise to "end the gravy train", the administration spent time on consideration of staffing levels at the city. In 2011, the budget committee of council passed several recommendations to cut staff through layoffs and buyouts. In July 2011, the city offered buyout packages to 17,000 staff, depending on department approval, hoping to cut staff by 2,500 voluntarily. At the end of the period, over 1,000 Toronto staff accepted buyouts. In October 2011, the council voted 26–16 to 'contract out' garbage collection west of Yonge Street to a private contractor.

In 2012, several of the city's contracts expired with their unionized staff: inside workers, outside workers, part-time parks and recreation staff, paramedics and library staff. The first union to settle was the outside workers, represented by the Canadian Union of Public Employees (CUPE) Local 416. Negotiations with the outside workers went to the deadline and a deal was made averting a strike or lockout. One major change was the controversial "jobs for life" clause in the bargaining agreement which stated that all permanent employees with 10 years of service or more were guaranteed a job of equal pay for equal value if theirs was contracted out. CUPE accepted a change to 15 years of service under the same provision. During the 2012 bargaining sessions, Holyday threatened to unilaterally impose the city's offer.

== Transit policy ==
During the 2010 mayoral campaign, Ford promised to make the TTC an "essential service." This would remove the TTC workers' right to strike and force collective bargaining disputes to be resolved through binding arbitration. Toronto City Council approved the designation of the TTC in January 2011 and the Government of Ontario passed The Toronto Transit Commission Labour Disputes Resolution Act in March 2011.

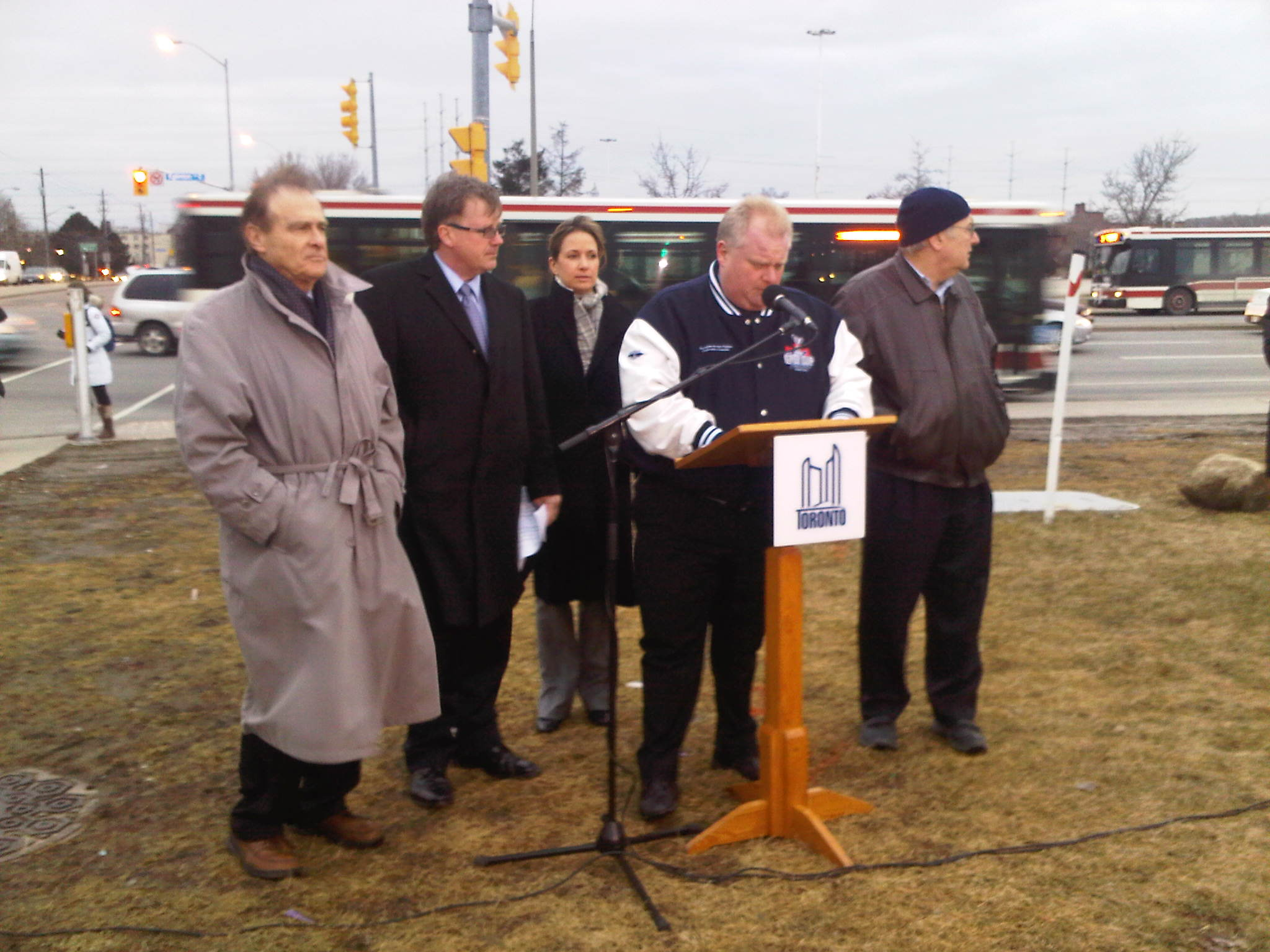
Ford speaking about subway extension to Scarborough in February 2012

Another of Ford's campaign pledges was to halt the Transit City transit plan. Instead of the surface light rail transit (LRT) lines of Transit City, Ford proposed to build underground lines. After being elected, Ford negotiated a Memorandum of Understanding between the Government of Ontario and the City of Toronto for the Metrolinx provincial transit agency to build the Crosstown LRT entirely underground. Under the proposal, the City of Toronto would build an extension for the Sheppard subway line using its own funds, private funding agreements and any monies remaining from commitments from Ontario and the Government of Canada. Metrolinx put a stop to the construction of the Sheppard East LRT, which was already started.

Ford set up an agency to study funding of the subway project, under the direction of former councillor Gordon Chong. Chong proposed user fees, parking fees and/or road taxes, but these options were rejected by Ford. In 2012, Toronto City Council held a special meeting to overturn the Ford-Ontario plan and voted to put a section of the Crosstown above-ground, and use the savings to build a LRT line along Finch Avenue West. Council decided further to study whether to put a subway line between the Don Mills subway station and Scarborough Town Centre or put an LRT line along Sheppard as far east as Morningside Avenue. The Council meeting, at the instigation of TTC chair Karen Stintz, led to a special TTC management committee meeting where TTC general manager Gary Webster was fired. Webster, against the wishes of Ford, had recommended that Council build the light rails as proposed in the Transit City plan. Council then held a special meeting to depose the TTC committee, replacing the board members who fired Webster.

The Sheppard panel returned in March 2012 with a recommendation to build the LRT option along Sheppard as originally proposed. Ford opposed the LRT but Council voted to approve the project. At the last minute, Ford's allies on council attempted to set up a parking lot fee to help fund the project, but Ford did not support the fee, and his allies could not sway the majority of council. Ford stated after the vote that this would be an issue in the next municipal election and he would do what he could to prevent the LRT construction and start campaigning to overturn the decision. In April, Metrolinx approved a plan of construction on the LRT transit projects, projecting a completion in 2020.

On existing TTC service, Ford voted for service cuts several times. In January 2011 Ford voted for service cuts on 41 bus routes, out of 48 originally proposed, to save $2.6 million. In January 2012, Council voted 23–21 to put $5 million into the TTC to prevent service reductions, a measure Ford opposed. In January 2013, Ford voted against putting the TTC operating surplus of $22 million back into the TTC, taking the money back into City general funds.

In 2013, Metrolinx began a study of user fees and taxes to fund future public transit improvements in the Greater Toronto and Hamilton area. All area governments were asked for input for Metrolinx's final report to the Ontario government. Ford announced his opposition to any new taxes or fees for funding transit: "people don’t want a tax increase ... I'm not going to implement tolls on the people of the city." In early April, Metrolinx issued a short list of 11 funding sources, including the four options supported by the Toronto Board of Trade: sales tax, payroll tax, parking space levy, gas tax. City of Toronto staff were commissioned to examine the short list and propose a list for City Council to recommend to Metrolinx. The staff report, advocating the parking levy, sales tax and development fees, was delivered to the City Council executive committee which Ford chairs. Ford reiterated his opposition to any new fees and expressed a distrust of the Ontario government to implement any fees wisely. Instead of making a recommendation, the committee voted 6–4 along with Ford to delay the report to Council until after May 28, which would be too late for Council to make any recommendations to Metrolinx. Ford's chief of staff commented that Ford and his team would make any new taxes an issue in the forthcoming 2014 election. City Council removed the item from the Executive Committee's jurisdiction and the report was debated at Council. Council objected to most of the proposed taxes, but did not object to a sales tax and development fees directed for transit.

During the summer of 2013, City Council endorsed a plan to modify the proposed LRT replacement and extension of the Scarborough RT into a Scarborough Subway Extension. The proposed modification would cost an additional $1.1 billion and serve 3 stations compared to the proposed LRT's 7 stations. Ford endorsed the plan and sought funding from Ontario and Canadian governments. The Ontario and Federal government stood by their commitment for $1.8 billion of funding for the line, however they refused to provide funding to cover the additional cost of a subway. City council endorsed the subway plan in October 2013. Despite his stated opposition to tax increases for transit funding, Ford and council backed a 0.5% property tax increase to fund the line. The subway plan was opposed by Scarborough councillor Paul Ainslie, who thought the overall cost of the subway plan would be significantly higher than the expected $3 billion cost. After the vote, Ainslie resigned from Ford's executive committee. Ford retaliated by recording a "robocall"' sent to voters in Ainslie's ward. The message denounced Ainslie for voting against the subway plan and for the original LRT plan. Ainslie promised to complain to the city's Integrity Commissioner and to a federal regulator.

Ford discussed his transit objectives for the 2014 municipal election, stating that he would seek to restart discussions of a Sheppard Avenue East subway, and revisit the plan to put an LRT on Finch Avenue West. He also stated that those would be his priorities over the building of a "Downtown Relief Line" subway that would bypass existing congestion on subway lines. "To be fair, the downtown people have enough subways already, I think it is only time to treat everyone equally and Scarborough and North York, Etobicoke — everyone deserves subways here. So let's connect Sheppard and work on Finch and look at the downtown relief line."

== Media relations ==
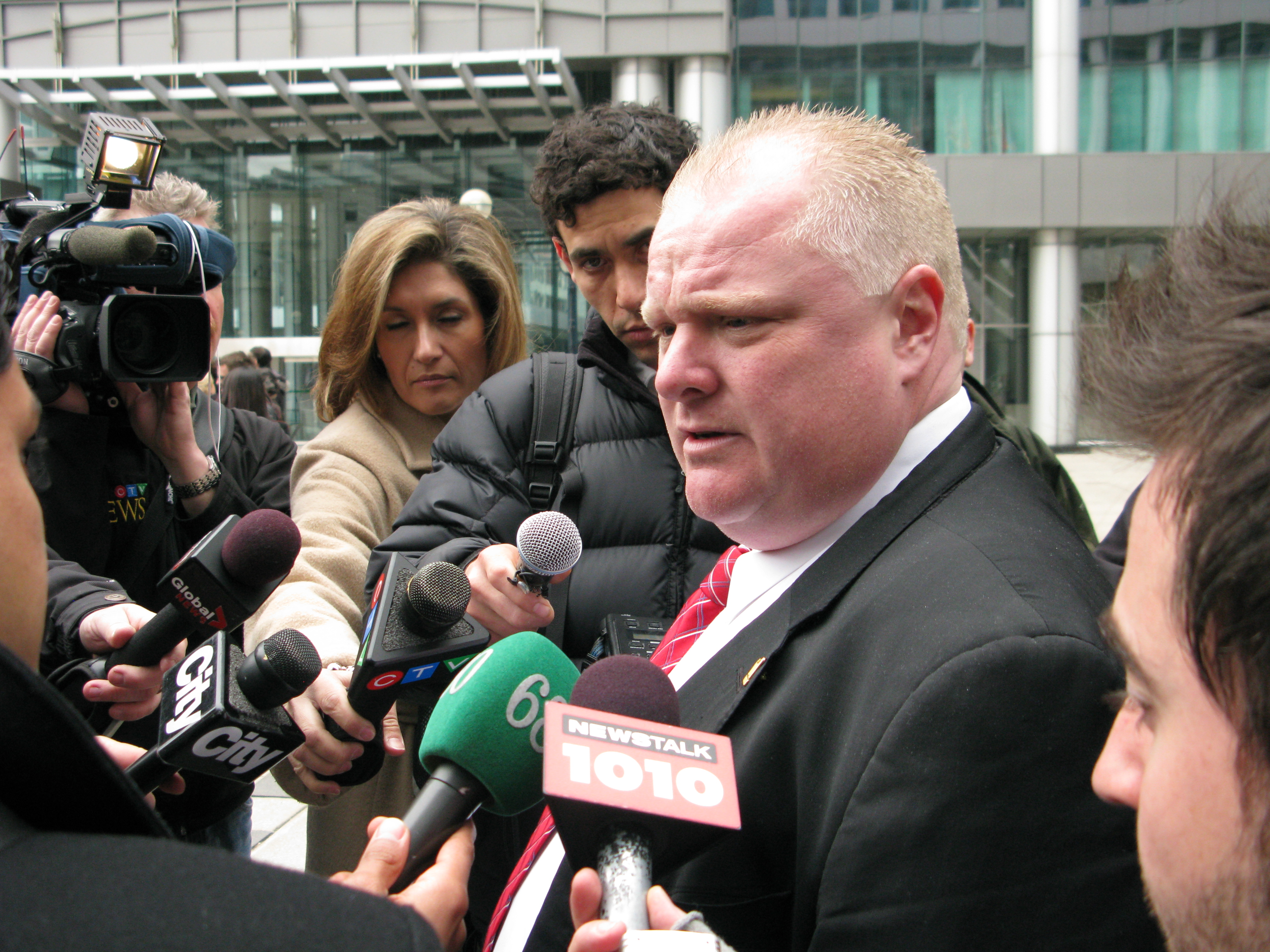
Ford speaking to reporters in April 2011

Over his career, Rob Ford frequently criticized and came into conflict with the media. Not long after his election, NOW Magazine published a fake nude photograph of Ford on its cover, with a strategically placed fig leaf. The issue (NOW is distributed as a free weekly) was initially removed from all locations at City Hall and later returned. While Ford did not ask for an apology, his supporters on council did, but NOW refused. The Toronto Star and Ford began an ongoing dispute. Several columnists regularly wrote critical articles of Ford. In response, Ford refused to meet with Toronto Star reporters and in December 2011, the Toronto Star filed a complaint with the City of Toronto's integrity commissioner.

The doors to the mayor's office that had been symbolically open during Mayor David Miller's term were shut. Ford's press secretary Adrienne Batra kept Ford's meeting schedule secret except to freedom-of-information requests. After reporters asked if Ford had met with one of his campaign donors, Vaughan developer Mario Cortellucci, Batra stopped including the names of Ford's meeting partners. Batra later left the mayor's office to join the Toronto Sun.

On October 24, 2011, Ford was confronted in the driveway of his home by Mary Walsh, a cast member of the CBC satirical show This Hour Has 22 Minutes, in costume as her character Marg Delahunty. When Walsh and the CBC TV crew tried to interview Ford, Ford retreated into the house and called 911. Ford called again a few minutes after the first call, this time using obscenities. CBC News reported that Ford had sworn at the dispatchers, which Ford initially denied, then later admitted to. "After being attacked in my driveway, I hope I can be excused for saying the f-word. I never called anyone any names. I apologize for expressing my frustration inappropriately."

On February 26, 2012, Ford, along with his brother Doug, began hosting a weekly two-hour radio program on CFRB Newstalk 1010 called The City with Mayor Rob Ford & Councillor Doug Ford. The Fords' show discussed current topics affecting the City of Toronto, with phone-in guests.

In June 2013, it was revealed that David Price, Ford's director of operations and logistics and longtime personal friend, had frequently called the radio program using the pseudonym "Dave from Scarborough." The Fords gave no indication that they recognized the man calling in as Price. In the calls, Price praised the mayor for such things as mentoring young people, while referring to former Toronto mayor David Miller as "comrade Miller" and condemning Miller's implementation of Toronto's 5¢ bag fee as "fascism". Ford suspended Price for a week without pay after Price made a call to Toronto Sun staff writer Don Peat to complain about the reporting of the story. On November 8, 2013, in the midst of revelations by Ford about his admitted crack use and "drunken stupors", it was "mutually determined to conclude" the show with the November 3 broadcast being the last in the series.

In May 2012, when the Toronto Star was investigating a potential purchase of public lands bordering his home, Star reporter Daniel Dale and Ford had an incident. According to Ford, at 7:30 pm, a neighbour told him that someone was taking pictures of his home while standing on a cinder block on public property behind his house, while the property in question is on the side of his house. Ford confronted the reporter and yelled at him.

According to Dale, he was "cornered like a rat" by Ford, yelled for help, repeatedly asked Ford not to punch him, dropped his cell phone and digital recorder and ran, scared of Ford. The next day, on Talk Radio 640, Ford stated that he would no longer meet with any City Hall reporters if Dale were present. Ford's comments to the media about Dale trespassing were found to be false by the police and no charges were laid in the incident.

On November 18, 2013, Ford and his brother debuted a Sun News Network television series Ford Nation. Despite garnering record ratings for the channel, the show was cancelled the next day; Sun News Network explained that the show had high production costs due to the length of time it took to record and edit the premiere episode. Afterwards, the Fords continued producing their show independently and uploaded new episodes to YouTube from February to April 2014.

On December 9, 2013, in a prerecorded interview with Conrad Black for Vision TV's The Zoomer, when asked about his worst experience with the media, Ford insinuated that Dale is a pedophile: "I guess the worst one was Daniel Dale in my backyard taking pictures. I have little kids. When a guy's taking pictures of little kids. I don't want to say that word but you start thinking, 'What's this guy all about?'" Ford repeated the next day that he stood by his words, although Dale had never been in his backyard. Dale replied publicly that he would have sued over Ford's lies and slanders had he not been working for the Star, and called Ford's behaviour "vile".

On December 12, 2013, Dale filed a libel notice with the mayor and the Zoomermedia television program, the first step of a defamation lawsuit, after Ford repeated his insinuations on a Washington, D.C. radio program. At a City Council meeting on December 17, Ford apologized to Dale. After Dale rejected the apology as inadequate, Ford went further and retracted all comments he made, and Vision TV added its apology. Dale announced he would not proceed with the libel action.

== Conflict of interest trial ==
In August 2010, the City of Toronto's integrity commissioner ruled that then-Councillor Ford had not followed City Council's Code of Conduct by using official letterhead and other council resources in fund-raising letters for his football foundation. Ford had accepted $3,150 on behalf of the foundation and the commissioner indicated that Ford should pay back the money. On August 25, 2010, the City Council discussed the integrity commissioner's report and voted 26–10 for Ford to return the money.

Ford spoke and voted at the February 7 meeting as City Council voted "[t]hat City Council rescind the previous decision made under Item CC52.1 and direct that no further action be taken on this matter", which carried by majority, 22 voting Yes, 12 No, with 11 absent. In March 2012, a complaint was filed by Paul Magder from Toronto alleging that Ford's actions in voting at the February 2012 Council meeting had violated the Ontario Municipal Conflict of Interest Act (MCIA).

The lawsuit came to trial in Ontario Superior Court in September 2012. Ontario Superior Court Judge Hackland ruled that Ford had violated the MCIA and declared his seat vacant, the decision stayed to allow an appeal. Ford appealed the decision and the Ontario Superior Court upheld Ford's appeal. The judges declared that the original judge had erred because the financial judgment was not under the City of Toronto Act or the Council Code of Conduct. Further, the sanction was beyond the authority of the City Council to enact. Magder filed an appeal of the decision to the Canadian Supreme Court, but the Court declined to hear the appeal.

== Substance abuse incidents ==
On St. Patrick's Day in March 2012, Ford was "very intoxicated" at City Hall and a downtown restaurant. According to those attending, Ford held a "wild party" in his office. Ford knocked down a staffer, insulted others, then went to the BierMarkt restaurant. After "flailing around" on the restaurant's dance floor, Ford returned to City Hall by cab, making racial slurs to the driver. The Mayor then wandered around City Hall after 2 AM with a bottle of brandy, swearing at his staffer Earl Provost before security arranged for him to be taken home. The incident was revealed in November 2013 after an e-mail from a City Hall security guard describing the incident was found through Access to Information requests.

Statements to the Police from the Ford aide Isaac Ransom included in Ford's entourage a beautiful young woman Ransom then knew only as "Alana". Ransom told Police he believed Alana was an "escort or prostitute". He told them he believed Alana brought hashish to the mayor. He told them he believed the mayor met Alana at a "stag party". Ransom later told the police that Alana was Alana Kindree, a former Miss Toronto Tourism. In March 2013, former mayoralty candidate Sarah Thomson accused Ford of touching her inappropriately and making inappropriate comments while posing for a picture together at a political function.

In a radio interview the following week, Thomson suggested that Ford was on cocaine: "I thought he was, yes, but I don't know," she said. "I went back and looked up, you know, what are the signs of cocaine use. I looked it up and you know sweaty, talking quickly, out of it, arrogant — all these things were on there. What I read on Google, I would think he's either on that or some other substance ... he was definitely out of it." Ford responded on his radio show by saying that Thomson's story wasn't true and commented on Thomson: "In my personal opinion, I've always said I don't know if she's playing with a full deck from the first time I met her."

Later in March, the Toronto Star reported that Paul Ainslie, a member of the Toronto City Council executive committee, had asked Ford to leave the Garrison Ball function two weeks prior to the Thomson event, due to Ford being intoxicated. The Toronto Star then published a front-page story accusing Ford of having a "drinking problem", which was an "open secret" at City Hall. In both cases, Ford or his chief of staff Mark Towhey denied the allegations. Ford said the Star story was an outright lie; he said, "Let's just wait until the election, and then we'll see what happens ... It's just lies, after lies and lies".

On May 16, 2013, American gossip website Gawker said it had been offered a video showing Ford apparently smoking crack cocaine. Gawker editor John Cook reported that he viewed the video and described that it features Ford holding a clear glass pipe in one hand and a lighter in the other. According to Cook, Ford lights the pipe and inhales.

The following day, two Toronto Star reporters wrote that they had also viewed the clip, on a smartphone in the backseat of a car on May 3, and noted that they have "no way to verify the authenticity of the video" but that it "appears to clearly show Ford in a well-lit room" and "inhaling from what appears to be a glass crack pipe." On May 17, Ford denied the allegations, calling them, "Absolutely not true." Radio station NEWSTALK 1010 and the Toronto Sun reported that they also had been contacted about purchasing the video. On May 23, Gawker posted that it had lost touch with the video owner.

In the two weeks following the initial reports, Ford fired his chief of staff Mark Towhey and five members of his City Hall staff left to pursue other opportunities. On June 13, 2013, CTV News reported that, according to police sources, the police had been aware of the alleged video for weeks before the Gawker report.

In August 2013, Ford was recorded on video at the Taste of the Danforth festival by other festival goers. He was described as slurring his words and being "wasted" as he walked through the festival area alone talking to other visitors. City staff and police later arrived to assist Ford. The video was posted on social media and festival goers commented on social media about Ford's condition. The next day, councillor Jaye Robinson repeated her call for Ford to take a leave of absence. Ford responded to criticism by admitting to "having a few beers". His brother Doug and Deputy Mayor Doug Holyday stated that the incident was blown out of proportion. Later that month, Ford was asked if he had ever smoked marijuana. Ford said, "I won't deny that, I smoked a lot of it."

On October 31, 2013, Toronto's police chief Bill Blair said he had viewed a video that "depicts images that are consistent with those previously reported in the press" and added, "It's safe to say the mayor does appear in the video". The Associated Press reported that the video had been "deleted from a computer" and that it "appears to show Mayor Rob Ford smoking from a crack pipe."

The announcement also came with the news that Ford's friend Alexander Lisi had been arrested in relation to the whole police investigation entitled "Project Brazen 2". In a short public response later that day, Mayor Ford said, "I have no reason to resign, I'm going to go back and return my phone calls, gonna be out doing what the people elected me to do and that's save taxpayers money and run a great government." Toronto police released a redacted version of a nearly 500-page report for 'Project Brazen 2' to the public. On November 3, 2013, on his weekly radio show, Ford responded to the scandal by apologizing for "making mistakes". He reiterated his plans to continue as mayor and run for reelection in 2014. Ford publicly asked Police Chief Blair to release the video to the public.

On November 5, 2013, Ford admitted to having smoked crack cocaine saying, "Yes, I have smoked crack cocaine but ... am I an addict? No. Have I tried it? Um, probably in one of my drunken stupors, probably approximately about a year ago." Responding to why the admission took so long, Ford said, "I wasn't lying. You didn't ask the correct questions." In a statement made to the press at the end of the day, Ford issued an apology and reiterated his plans to stay in office and to run for reelection.

On November 7, 2013, another video of Ford surfaced, depicting Ford in a tirade in which he shouts, "I need fuckin' ten minutes to make sure he's dead!" The context of the comments and the video are unknown. The video had been shopped around to various media outlets before being purchased by the Toronto Star for $5,000. Ford states that he was "extremely inebriated" in the video: "All I can say is again I've made mistakes. It's extremely embarrassing. The whole world's going to see it. You know what? I don't have a problem with it. But it is extremely embarrassing, but I don't know what to say but again I am apologizing. Again, when you're in that state ... I hope none of you have ever or will ever be in that state."

On November 13, 2013, Judge Nordheimer ordered the release of the rest of the blacked-out items in the documents detailing the surveillance of Ford and a friend, Alexander Lisi. An Ipsos Reid poll was released showing that 76% of Torontonians want Ford to step down or resign. Standing in questioning before Toronto City Council meeting, Ford admitted to having purchased illegal drugs within the past two years. The council voted 37–5 to ask for Ford to take a leave of absence. Council also voted for Ford to apologize for misleading council; co-operate with the Police; apologize for letter of reference for Lisi and communicate with Council instead of the media. Ford then pushed for mandatory drug testing for all councillors by December 1, paid for by himself. Chair Frances Nunziata ruled Ford's motion out of order.

On November 14, 2013, Ford threatened legal action against his former staffers and a waiter at the restaurant of the St. Patrick's Day night party, calling their allegations "outright lies, not true." Ford specifically denied the allegations of sex and a comment about oral sex made to a staff member, and that a woman who attended the St. Patrick's Day night party was a prostitute. "Olivia Gondek. It said I want to eat her pussy. I've never said that in my life to her. I would never do that. I'm happily married. I've got more than enough to eat at home." Later that day, Ford admitted to drinking and driving.

Ontario Premier Kathleen Wynne announced that the Government of Ontario was ready to intervene if the Toronto City Council requested it. The intervention would have been in the form of new powers to be used by Toronto City Council.

In a November 17, 2013, interview with CBC News' Peter Mansbridge, Ford said he had a "come to Jesus moment" and said he would never drink again.

On January 21, 2014, a new video surfaced depicting Ford, allegedly intoxicated at a restaurant in Rexdale while speaking Jamaican Patois. On January 29, 2014, in an interview with the Toronto Sun, Ford denied allegations he was involved in the death of Anthony Smith, who was shot to death on March 28, 2013.

On February 8, 2014, The Toronto Star reported on an alleged incident in Vancouver on February 1, 2014. Ford, while visiting a bar reportedly disappeared into a bathroom stall for more than an hour only to emerge talking in nonsensical language. Ford and the people he was with at the time then ordered many alcoholic drinks after the legal 2 a.m. last call. The Star acquired photographic evidence of the events.

On April 5, 2014, Ford, described as "belligerent", was given a warning by security guards at the Air Canada Centre during a Toronto Maple Leafs game. After the game, he later purportedly took a cab to city hall alone and then to a nightclub.

=== Operation: Project Traveler/Project Brazen 2 ===
Initially police conducted a drugs-guns investigation targeting narcotic distribution gangs such as the infamous "Dixon City Bloods" involved with the Ford crack cocaine video. The investigation spun off with "Project Brazen 2" as relationships between the Dixon City Bloods and Ford were uncovered.

In November 2013, Canadian media were granted permission to publish a series of text messages and wire taps which were intercepted by the Toronto Police during a surveillance operation entitled "Project Brazen 2." Although Ford never spoke to his underworld narcotics associates, candid conversations implied communication between gangsters and Ford's friend Alexander Lisi. Allegedly, Ford misplaced his phone during the night of April 20 indulging in drug binge at 15 Windsor Road where he was also photographed injecting heroin "Doing the Hezza" and smoking the "Dagga" (marijuana).

Ford provided a contrary explanation to his staff, saying that he misplaced his phone on the hood of his car during a voluntary spring clean. According to the police's interpretation a conversation (caught by a wiretap) between two of the gang members, Ford tried to offer a man named Mohamed Siad a car and $5,000 cash in exchange for the video (suggesting that Ford had prior knowledge of the existence of the footage), but Siad wanted $150,000 in exchange and he was approaching Ford for more money.

On February 5, 2014, Joe Warmington, of the Toronto Sun, reported that in response to rumours police were seeking a search warrant to require access to Ford's cell phone and OnStar account that he would grant police access to his devices without requiring a search warrant. However, later that day, Don Peat, also of the Toronto Sun, wrote that Ford had backtracked, and would insist the police acquire a search warrant, after all. On March 5, 2014, the Ontario Provincial Police was asked to take charge of oversight on Project Brazen 2 from the Toronto Police Service.

=== Emergence of second video and leave of absence ===
On April 30, 2014, The Globe and Mail had received a screen capture of a video that had allegedly been recorded April 26. The video depicts the mayor smoking from what appears to be a long, copper-coloured crack pipe, in his sister Kathy's basement. As the video pans around, a man resembling the mayor's former driver Alessandro Lisi is seen.

The same day, an audio recording acquired by the Toronto Sun allegedly depicting Ford in a drunken state during a separate incident on April 28 was made public. In the recording Ford appeared to attack Progressive Conservative leader Tim Hudak for voting in favour of raising a Pride flag in front of the Ontario legislature during the Sochi Olympics, make lewd comments about city councillor and mayoral candidate Karen Stintz, as well as repeatedly use threatening language and derogatory slang terms.

On the night of April 30, Ford released a statement announcing he was taking a leave of absence from his duties as mayor and from his re-election campaign to seek "professional help" for his "problem with alcohol". Ford left town, for a rehabilitation program. Initially intending to check into a facility in Chicago, Ford voluntarily turned back at the border and entered the GreeneStone rehabilitation facility in Bala, Ontario.

As of May 1, Deputy Mayor Norm Kelly assumed the remainder of Ford's powers that were not already delegated to him by City Council in November. Ford returned to office June 30, 2014, after two months in rehab.

According to one source, the effective removal of Ford from the mayor's seat opened Toronto politics and significant advances were achieved for a people's agenda.

==== Removal of powers by City Council ====
On November 15, 2013, two separate motions were passed by Toronto City Council that removed key aspects of Ford's powers as Mayor of Toronto and transferred them to the Deputy Mayor. By an overwhelming margin, city council decided to transfer his executive powers and most of his staff to the deputy mayor. This action was motivated primarily by the video scandal, and resulted in removing Ford's power to govern the city in a state of emergency, though he still possessed the power to declare a state of emergency. David Price, Ford's friend and former football coach, who had been hired personally by Ford at twice the salary of others in the mayor's office, was terminated.

Following the November 15 votes, Ford stated that he would challenge the removal of any powers in court and personally retained the services of municipal lawyer George Rust-D'Eye. Ford further likened the November 18 votes to a coup d'état and compared his situation with the 1990 invasion of Kuwait, promising "outright war" in response to the councillors who voted to remove his powers.

== Sources ==
- McDonald, Marci (2012). "The Incredible Shrinking Mayor". Toronto Life (May 2012): 40–54. Archived from the original on October 28, 2014.
