= Miss Toronto Tourism =

Beauty pageant in Canada

The Miss Toronto Tourism pageant has been run since 1999. The pageant was formed to revive Miss Toronto pageant that was first run by Toronto Harbour Commissioners from 1926 to 1928, and then by the Amateur Police Athletics Association from 1937 to 1991. However, by that time "Miss Toronto" was registered as a name for a cruise ship company in Toronto, hence the title "Miss Toronto Tourism". It is the only non-ethnic Toronto local beauty pageant.

The title holders attend various charity events across GTA including Rotary Club Charity Auction, Afroglobal TV Excellence awards, parades (Canada day, Santa Claus, St. Patrick Day), and charity walks.

== Past Title Holders ==
Year	Title Holder
1999	
2000	
2001	
2002	Nancy
2003	Laura
2004	Gabriela
2005	
2006	Carla
2007	Jessica
2008	
2009	Lorraine
2010	Alana
2011	
2012	
2013	Kendall
2014	Prinscila
2015	
2016	Kalista

== Controversies ==
A couple of former Miss Toronto Tourism have been involved in controversies. Alana Kindree, formerly Miss Toronto Tourism 2010, was involved in controversies involving Rob Ford. She was observed partying with a heavily intoxicated Ford on March 17, 2012 -- St Patrick's Day.
