= Rachel Barney =

Canadian philosopher

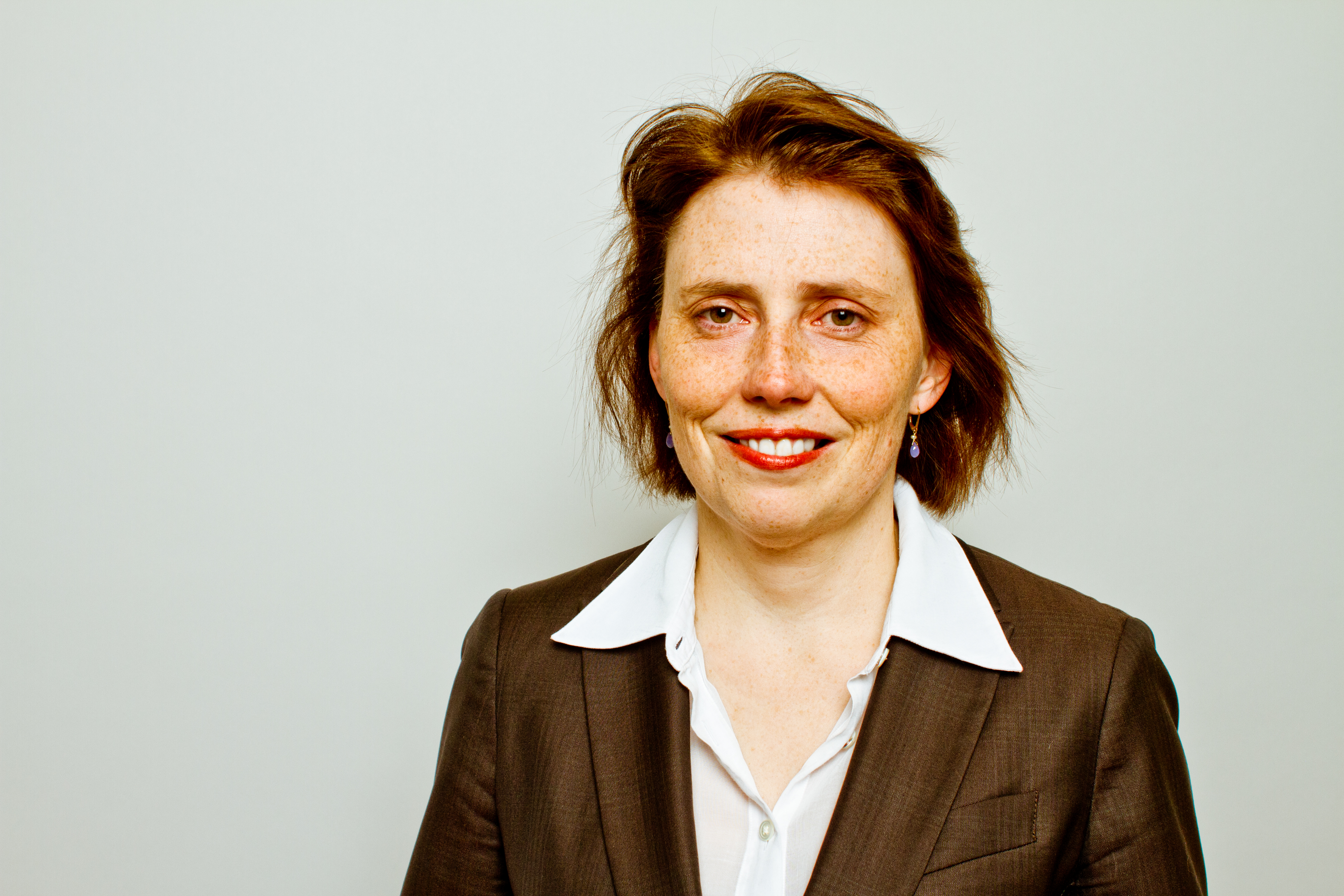
- Born: 14 September 1966 (age 60)

Education
- Education: Princeton University (PhD)
- Thesis: A Reading of Plato's Cratylus (1995)
- Doctoral advisor: John Madison Cooper

Philosophical work
- Era: 21st-century philosophy
- Region: Western philosophy
- Institutions: University of Toronto
- Main interests: ancient philosophy
- Website: http://individual.utoronto.ca/rbarney/Home.html

Rachel Barney (born 14 September 1966) is a Canadian philosopher and Professor and Acting Associate Chair at the department of philosophy at the University of Toronto. She is known for her works on ancient philosophy.

== Education and career ==
Barney got her undergraduate degree from the University of Toronto while studying at Trinity College. She earned her PhD at Princeton. She returned back to the University of Toronto after teaching at the University of Chicago, the University of Ottawa, and Harvard. Barney did research that ranged from the early sophists to the late Neoplatonic commentator Simplicius; nevertheless, most of her research focused on Plato. Her most prominent areas of research are ethics, psychology, philosophical methods, and epistemology.

In the 2011 Canadian federal election, Barney was Green Party candidate in Trinity—Spadina, placing fourth.

== Publications ==
- Names and Nature in Plato’s Cratylus, Routledge, 2001
- Plato and the Divided Self, co-edited with Tad Brennan and Charles Francis Brittain, Cambridge University Press, 2012
- “History and Dialectic (Metaphysics A 3, 983a24-4b8)”, in Carlos Steel ed., Aristotle’s Metaphysics Alpha (Symposium Aristotelicum XVIII) (Oxford University Press, 2012)
- “Notes on the Kalon and the Good in Plato,” Classical Philology (Special Issue: Beauty, Harmony and the Good, October 2010)
- ”Plato on Desire for the Good”, S. Tenenbaum, ed., Desire, Good, and Practical Reason. (Oxford: Oxford University Press, 2010)
- “Ring-Composition in Plato: the Case of Republic X,” in M. McPherran, ed., Plato’s Republic: A Critical Guide (Cambridge: Cambridge University Press, 2010)
- “Gorgias’ Defence: Plato and his Opponents on Rhetoric and the Good,” Southern Journal of Philosophy 48.1 (2010): 95-121
- “Simplicius: Commentary, Harmony, and Authority,” Antiquorum Philosophia 3 (2009): 101-20
- “Aristotle’s Argument for a Human Function,” Oxford Studies in Ancient Philosophy 34 (2008): 293-322
- “Eros and Necessity in the Ascent from the Cave,” Ancient Philosophy 28:2 (2008): 357-72
- “The Carpenter and the Good”, in D. Cairns, F. G. Herrmann, and T. Penner (eds.) Pursuing the Good: Ethics and Metaphysics in Plato’s Republic (Edinburgh: University of Edinburgh Press, 2008).
