= Toronto Solid Waste Management =

Toronto Solid Waste Management Services
- The municipal logo of Toronto

Agency overview
- Type: Division
- Jurisdiction: City of Toronto
- Website: Official website

Toronto Solid Waste Management Services is the municipal service that handles the transfer and disposal of garbage as well as the processing and sale of recyclable materials collected through the blue box program in Toronto, Ontario, Canada.

It serves approximately 870,000 homes and non-residential establishments. It also coordinates programs to help residents and business reduce their production of waste.

== History ==
Under Mayor Rob Ford, the City began to look at ways to cut cost on waste management. One solution was for contracting out waste collection services to private contractors.

With the exception of Etobicoke, the rest of Toronto's waste services employees were civic staff. In Etobicoke services are contracted out to Turtle Island Recycling Company of Toronto since 2008. Transport of waste from transfer stations to landfills are contracted out to Republic Services Canada Incorporated of Dundas, Ontario and Wilson Logistics Incorporated of Toronto, Ontario.

Beginning in the mid-2012, a new contractor began residential pickup services. GFL Environmental from Pickering, Ontario began to service the city west of Yonge Street and east of Etobicoke. In October 2011, the city nor contractors have indicated if current waste staff will be hired back to work on the two contracts, but in December GFL acquired Turtle Island Recycling and took over the remaining term of the former contract from December 2011 and will be replaced by Miller Waste Systems beginning in 2015.

== Facilities ==
The division manages four collections yards, one maintenance yard, seven transfer stations, six household hazardous waste depots, two organics processing facilities, Green Lane Landfill and 160 former landfills.

=== Former landfills ===
There are 160 former dumps located within the former city of Toronto and former Metro Toronto area but most have been redeveloped in the 20th Century:

- Harper's Dump - located in what is Greenwood Subway Yard and used during the 1930s
- Riverdale Park - used for a single year in 1960

By the later 20th Century Toronto and previously Metro Toronto have used a number of sites mostly close to the city to handle solid waste collected:

- Keele Valley Landfill - former landfill owned and used by Metro Toronto from 1983 (Toronto since 1998 to 2002) to deal with waste from all municipalities that now make up Toronto. Now sits idle until 2028 when re-development can commence.
- Britannia Landfill - former landfill in Mississauga, Ontario took Metro Toronto and Toronto waste. Closed in 2002.
- Beare Road Landfill - former Metro Toronto landfill from 1967 to 1983 located in Scarborough.
- Brock Road Landfills - former landfill used by Metro Toronto from 1975 to 1990s in neighbouring communities of Pickering and Ajax.

By the late 1980s and 1990s the locate site were near capacity forcing authorities to look beyond for landfill to take their waste:

- Adams Mine - former iron ore pit mine that was slated to take Toronto waste in the 1990s, but rejected by then Metro Toronto council.
- Green Lane landfill - landfill near London, Ontario and purchased by Toronto in 2006 to handle waste from the city.
- Carleton Farms Landfill - landfill in Wayne County, Michigan that accepted Toronto's garbage from 2002 to 2006.

== Business sections ==
=== Collections & Litter Operations ===
Collections & Litter Operations provides collection of garbage, blue bin recycling, green bin organics, yard waste, oversized and metal items.

They also provide litter cleaning operations on sidewalks across the city, and service litter receptacles throughout city streets and parks. In addition, they provide services to special events, including the provision of Blue and Green Bins and collection of the materials.

Community Environment Day events are also overseen by Collections & Litter Operations.

=== Customer Service & Waste Diversion Operations ===
The Customer Service & Waste Diversion Operations section was established to support the division in its goal of improving customer service and implementing new diversion initiatives.

=== Transfer Station & Landfill Operations ===
Transfer Station & Landfill Operations is responsible for managing the performance and maintenance of the City’s network of facilities, including numerous closed landfill sites. The section is also responsible for the upkeep and repairs of an additional four operating and maintenance yards.

=== Policy, Planning & Outreach ===
Policy, Planning & Outreach is responsible for monitoring trends in the solid waste industry and advising on policy and planning of new programs, program enhancements and new technologies. It provides technical review and comments on internal and external regulations, legislation, statutes and policies.

The section coordinates research, design and drafting of harmonized programs, policies, eligibility criteria and bylaws to support operations. In addition to working with various orders of government to coordinate new policies and programs and their impacts to residents of Toronto, the section is also responsible for community and stakeholder outreach, working closely with the media to provide messaging on new and upcoming policy/program changes, as well as setting guidelines and policies for health and safety and environmental compliance for the entire division.

=== Business Services ===
Business Services manages the division’s financial planning, accounting, procurement, contract management and IT-related functions. It is also responsible for managing Divisional procurement plans and initiatives as well as providing oversight and administration of the division’s contract portfolio including contract life-cycle management and compliance-related activities.

In addition, the section provides internal IT support and is responsible for delivering the divisional IT project portfolio and managing the development, implementation and sustainment of Divisional IT assets and applications.

=== Infrastructure & Resource Management ===
Infrastructure & Resource Management is responsible for the division’s physical assets throughout their complete lifecycle, from initial design and construction; to commissioning and start-up; to meeting major maintenance and rehabilitation requirements during the life of the asset; to the eventual retirement and disposal of the asset. In addition, the section is responsible for the management of contracts for processing of recycling, organics, yard waste, mattresses and ceramics from the City’s collection programs as well as the sales of separated recyclables to market. Materials are transferred to various facilities (City-owned and non-City-owned) for processing and sales.

== See also ==
- Nine Dragons Paper Holdings Limited - paper recycler in China that has accepted recycled paper collected from Toronto, Ontario.
- Garbology
- Historical digging
- Dump digging
- Landfills in the United States
