= David Miller (Canadian politician) =

63rd mayor of Toronto

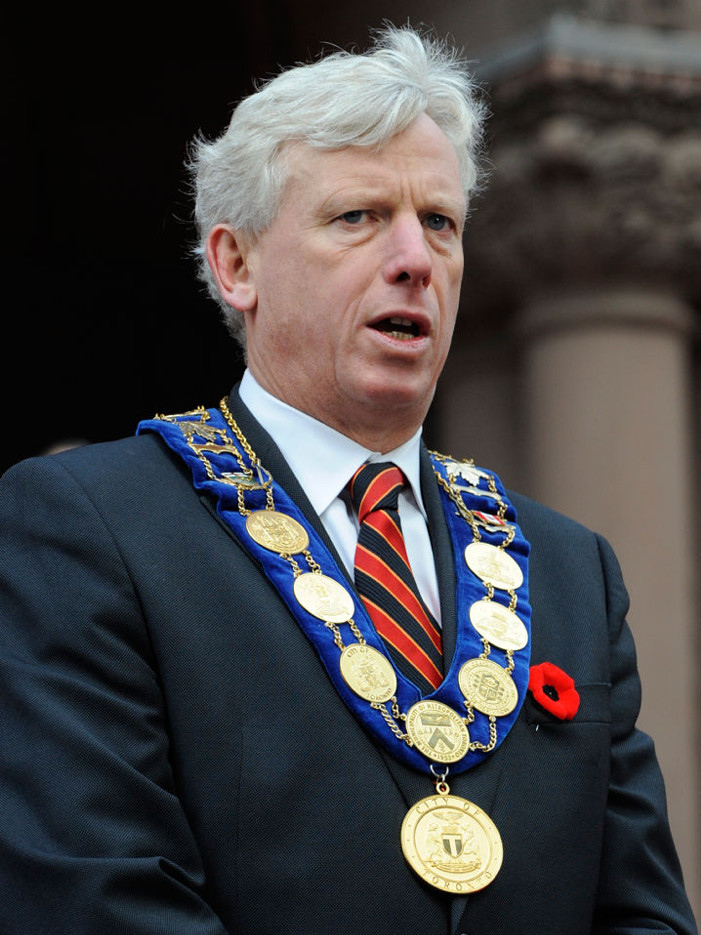
- Miller in 2009

63rd Mayor of Toronto
- In office December 1, 2003 – December 1, 2010
- Preceded by: Mel Lastman
- Succeeded by: Rob Ford

President and Chief Executive Officer of World Wildlife Fund Canada
- In office September 3, 2013 – November 30, 2017
- Preceded by: Gerald Butts
- Succeeded by: Megan Leslie

Personal details
- Born: David Raymond Miller; December 26, 1958 (age 67) San Francisco, California, U.S.
- Party: Independent (since 2007)
- Other political affiliations: New Democratic (until 2007) (Note: Municipal politicians in Ontario, including Toronto, run on a nonpartisan basis.)
- Spouse: Jill Arthur
- Children: 2
- Education: Harvard University; University of Toronto Faculty of Law

David Raymond Miller (born December 26, 1958) is a Canadian lawyer and former politician who served as the 63rd mayor of Toronto from 2003 to 2010.

Following his career in politics, Miller briefly returned to law before serving as president and CEO of the World Wildlife Fund Canada (WWF-Canada) from 2013 to 2017, after which he began working as the director of international diplomacy at C40 Cities Climate Leadership Group.

== Background ==
Miller was born in San Francisco, California. His American father, Joe Miller, died of cancer in 1960, and his English mother Joan returned with her son to Thriplow, south of Cambridge. Miller spent his earliest years in England before moving to Canada with his mother in 1967. He attended Lakefield College School on a scholarship.

Miller completed a four-year undergraduate degree at Harvard University, graduating summa cum laude in Economics in 1981. He earned a Bachelor of Laws degree from the University of Toronto Faculty of Law in 1984 and became a partner at the prominent Toronto law firm of Aird & Berlis LLP, specializing in employment, immigration law and shareholder rights. He represented Toronto Islands residents in a 1985 arbitration case while an articling student, and later described this experience as his introduction to municipal politics. He married fellow lawyer Jill Arthur in 1994, and the pair have two children.

Miller joined the New Democratic Party (NDP) in 1985. He first ran for Metropolitan Toronto council in 1991, campaigning on a platform of public transit improvements to establish Toronto as a world-class city. He lost to incumbent councillor Derwyn Shea. Miller was subsequently the NDP's candidate for Parkdale—High Park in the 1993 Canadian federal election, and finished fourth against Liberal incumbent Jesse Flis. He did not renew his membership in the NDP when it expired in 2007, stating that he did not want to be seen as partisan when dealing with the provincial and federal governments. In 2011, he joined NYU Poly as a faculty member.

== Councillor ==
=== Metro councillor ===
Miller campaigned for the Metro Toronto Council a second time in 1994, and was elected for the High Park ward over former Member of Parliament Andrew Witer and future Cabinet minister Tony Clement. Following the election, he was appointed to the Metro Planning and Transportation Committee, the Metro Anti-racism Committee, and the Board of Governors for Exhibition Place. He spoke against Metro's decision to cut $3 million from its staffing budget in early 1995, arguing that the resulting hardship for laid-off workers during a national recession would be "unconscionable".

The provincial government of Mike Harris amalgamated several surrounding municipalities into the City of Toronto in 1997, with the stated intention of eliminating duplication of services and increasing efficiency. Miller argued that the decision to eliminate six local councils and establish a "megacity" was carried out without public approval. He proposed an alternate plan to fold the six local councils into the existing Metro council, but this received little support.

He campaigned for the Legislative Assembly of Ontario in 1996, running as the NDP candidate in York South to succeed outgoing party leader Bob Rae. He was narrowly defeated by Liberal Party candidate Gerard Kennedy.

=== Toronto councillor ===
==== 1997–2000 ====
Following the amalgamation of Toronto, Miller was elected to the new Toronto City Council in the 1997 election, winning one of the two seats in Ward 19 High Park. He was appointed to the Toronto Transit Commission (TTC) after the election, and became a prominent ally of TTC chair Howard Moscoe. He was also appointed to lead a twelve-member committee that studied the transition to amalgamated municipal services, and successfully advocated that Toronto City Hall rather than Metro Hall to be the permanent seat of the new government. Miller later served on a three-member committee that recommended changes to the municipal ward boundaries.

Miller issued a formal apology on behalf of the TTC in June 1999, following complaints about a subway advertisement by the Toronto police union that some believed depicted Hispanics as criminals. The following year, he argued that the union's controversial "Operation True Blue" telemarketing campaign was creating a climate of intimidation for Toronto residents. Both Miller and his wife claimed that they had received threatening telephone calls during the 2000 municipal election, after the police union listed his home telephone number in a campaign advertisement.

Miller became known as an advocate for waterfront parklands during his time on council. He supported several aspects of a 2000 report from Robert Fung of the Toronto Waterfront Task Force, while criticizing the proposal to sell parkland near Exhibition Place for private development. He also opposed plans to construct a condominium near Toronto's High Park within his ward, instead supporting the construction of affordable housing for low-income residents.

Toronto's existing Keele Valley Landfill would reach capacity by 2002. Miller strongly opposed a plan by Mayor Mel Lastman to ship the city's garbage to the Adams Mine in Northern Ontario, which was ultimately voted down by council. The city instead sent its trash to Carleton Farms Landfill.

==== 2000–2003 ====
Following electoral redistribution, Miller was re-elected in 2000 over fellow councillor Bill Saundercook in Ward 13 Parkdale-High Park. He was re-appointed to the TTC and sought election as its chair, but was passed over in favour of Brian Ashton. In 2001, he expressed concern that the Wheel-Trans bus service for the disabled might be contracted out to the private sector.

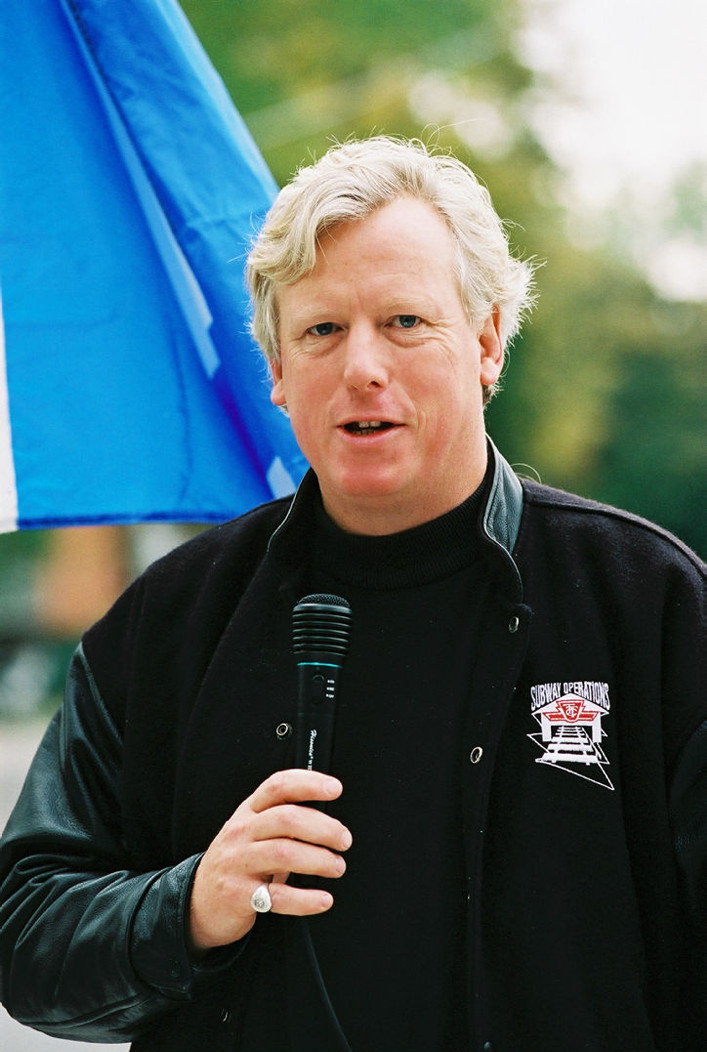
Miller as Councillor speaks at an event, 2001

Miller won the unanimous support of his colleagues in July 2001 for a motion requesting that the federal government approve the transfer of gasoline-tax revenues to Toronto's public transit system. He later suggested that Toronto's building revenues could be put toward priority spending rather than being stored in reserve accounts, arguing that the city's real estate boom would allow council to defer transit hikes and provide programs for children and the homeless. He was also a leading voice in exposing Toronto's MFP computer leasing scandal in 2001 and 2002, bringing to light several questionable lobbying practices at city hall.

As chair of the city's working group on immigrant and refugee issues, Miller introduced a mentorship program making it easier for recent immigrants to gain work experience in Toronto.

Miller was given an A+ grade and named the best councillor by Toronto Life magazine in November 2000 for his work on council. In April 2002, the Toronto Environmental Alliance awarded him an "A" grade for his work on the TTC.

Mayor Lastman and Miller had an adversarial relationship on council. This was exemplified during a May 2002 debate when Lastman yelled at Miller, "You will never be mayor of this city because you say stupid and dumb things!" Miller later remarked that the exchange was what encouraged him to run for mayor. Despite being council opponents, Lastman attended the funeral for Miller's mother.

Miller later became the most prominent opponent of Lastman's plan to build a $22 million bridge to the Toronto Island Airport. Supporters of the bridge argued that it would eliminate one of the world's shortest ferry rides, make airline service more efficient, and provide a financial benefit to the city. Miller argued that the bridge would prevent the city from revitalizing its waterfront, and asserted that the proposed deal put the interests of developers and lobbyists ahead of the public. The bridge became a major issue when he ran for mayor during the 2003 campaign.

=== 2003 mayoral campaign ===
Miller's plans to run for mayor were well-known around city hall in 2002, and there was little surprise when he formally declared his candidacy in January 2003. His earliest supporters included councillors Howard Moscoe, Sandra Bussin, Irene Jones and Anne Johnston and urban planner Jane Jacobs. He was later endorsed by councillors Olivia Chow, Joe Pantalone and Brian Ashton, public figures such as June Callwood, Judy Rebick, Margaret Atwood, Michael Ondaatje and Michele Landsberg, American environmental activist Robert F. Kennedy Jr., the Canadian Union of Public Employees (CUPE) and the Toronto Professional Fire Fighters Association. Toronto Star columnist Royson James and councillors Raymond Cho and Michael Walker also endorsed Miller near the end of the campaign.

Miller's campaign organization was diverse. As well as support from many New Democrats and social activists, his top campaign strategists included veteran Conservative John Laschinger and Liberal Peter Donolo. Architect Jack Diamond was also a co-chair of his campaign.

Miller used a broom as a prop in this campaign, symbolizing his commitment to cleaning up Toronto both literally, in terms of litter, and metaphorically, arguing that there were shady deals at City Hall. He pledged to cancel the airport bridge, appoint a municipal ethics commissioner, and promote public transit by fully implementing the TTC's ridership growth plan. He supported a police request to hire thirty-two new officers, and opposed rival candidate John Tory's plans for trash incineration in favour of continuing garbage shipments to Michigan.

At one stage in the campaign, Miller raised the possibility of collecting tolls on the Don Valley Parkway and Gardiner Expressway. After criticism from other candidates, including John Tory who described it as "Highway Robbery", Miller dropped the suggestion.

At the start of the campaign in early 2003, Barbara Hall led by a wide margin, with John Nunziata a distant second, while Miller and Tory initially had support in single digits. Miller's polling numbers stalled around 12-13 per cent for most of 2003, but increased in October when front-runner Hall suddenly lost much of her support. He first led a citywide poll on October 22, 2003, scoring 31 per cent support against 29 per cent for Hall and 23 per cent for John Tory.

Hall's support continued to dissipate, and she fell to a distant third. The final stage of the campaign was between Miller and Tory, who each had a base of solid support; Miller among urban residents and progressives, while Tory was backed by the suburbs and conservatives. Days before the vote, prominent Hall supporters Bob Rae and Kyle Rae acknowledged that she could not win, and encouraged her supporters to vote for Miller over Tory. Miller defeated Tory 43 per cent to 38 per cent (Hall was third with 9 per cent), and appointed Jane Jacobs and former Toronto Mayor David Crombie to chair his transition team.

== Mayor of Toronto (2003–2010) ==
Miller's first term as mayor focused on issues such as waterfront renewal, public transit and municipal reform. He also shifted toward a focus on community safety issues following an increase in gun violence during 2005. Many of Miller's initiatives did not come to fruition within his first few years as mayor. Supporters pointed out they were centred on long-term development goals, while detractors criticized the pace of change.

=== Waterfront policy ===
==== Toronto City Centre Airport Bridge ====
Soon after his election, Miller led the council to reverse its support for the Toronto City Centre Airport Bridge. He argued that the bridge was detrimental to the regional environment, was unwanted by most local residents, and stood in the way of a more comprehensive renewal of the waterfront economy. Supporters of the bridge argued that it would make airline service more efficient, and provide a financial benefit. The vote, held on December 3, 2003, was 32-12 in favour of withdrawal. Afterwards, the federal government announced that it would withdraw its support for the project. There were subsequent threats of legal action against the City by the Toronto Port Authority (TPA) and developer Robert Deluce, but these were settled in 2005 when the federal government agreed to pay $35 million in compensation.

The federal payment was controversial for both supporters and opponents of Miller's administration. Liberal MP Tony Ianno defended it as providing fair compensation to legitimate claimants, and saying that it invalidated Miller's pledge to cancel the bridge without incurring further expense. Miller's allies, including NDP leader Jack Layton, argued that the payout was overly generous, and did not reflect the true costs of cancellation. Shortly after the settlement, Miller announced that he would seek the repayment of $27 million in back taxes from the Port Authority to the city.

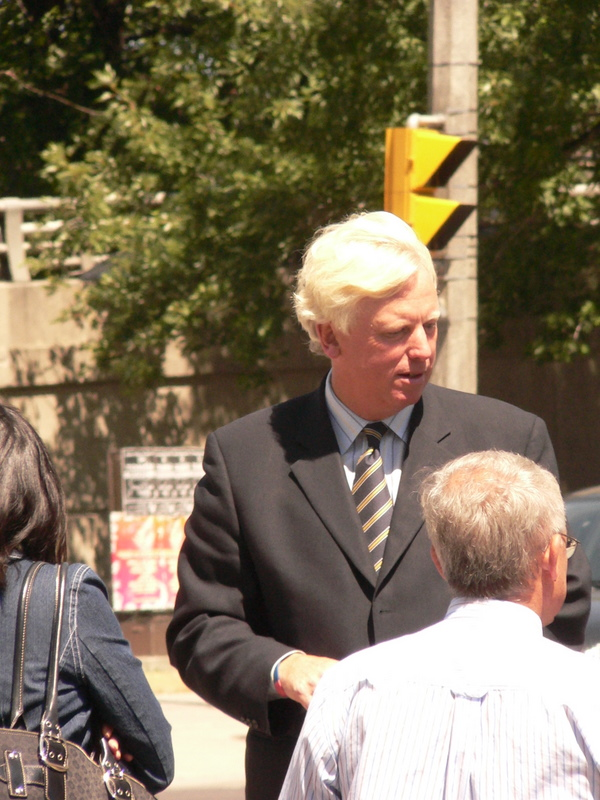
David Miller at the opening for the Quay to the City.

==== Airport expansion ====
In early 2006, Robert Deluce announced the creation of a company called Porter Airlines that would start a commuter service at the Island Airport, with the planes built at Bombardier's Downsview plant. It would provide travelers with direct flights to Toronto's city centre, which Pearson International is currently unable to offer, as it is located 30 km away. Opponents of expansion argued that increased services would result in greater noise pollution for downtown residents, as well as preventing other economies from flourishing in the waterfront region. Miller argued that the city may soon have to face the choice of "an industrial or revitalized waterfront". Some supporters of expansion have suggested this is a false dichotomy, and have argued that expansion can be integrated with a larger revitalization plan. Deluce's proposal won support from both business interests and Canadian Auto Workers leader Buzz Hargrove, who said it would create new jobs for workers in the region. A Toronto Star report from early February 2006 indicated most Toronto residents opposed expansion.

In late September 2006, it was reported that Robert Deluce's REGCO (the parent company of Porter Airlines) received $20 million of the $35 million paid by the federal government. This payment assisted Deluce in starting his new airline, and opponents have charged that it was for all intents and purposes a federal subsidy. Miller described the payout as "totally improper".

==== Toronto Port Authority (TPA) ====
The bridge and airport debates are reflective of a more general division between Miller's administration and the TPA, the federal body created by former Liberal MP Dennis Mills that controls the Toronto Island Airport. Miller called for the TPA to be either eliminated or significantly reformed, and has argued that more oversight powers should be granted to the Toronto Waterfront Revitalization Corp., which is managed by all three levels of government. Miller himself joined the TWRC as a voting member in 2006.

The Harper government announced in May 2006 that it would conduct a review of the Port Authority, and scrutinize past decisions related to the bridge project. Former deputy minister of justice Roger Tassé was named to oversee the review. Miller described himself as "cautiously optimistic", although he later found it "very regrettable and very worrying" that federal Transport Minister Lawrence Cannon appointed five members of the Port Authority executive before the report was complete. When the Tassé Report was released in November 2006, it defended the Port Authority's decision to sign a bridge contract just before the 2003 election, and described the $35 million payout to DeLuce as "reasonable". Miller dismissed the document as "not worth the paper it is written on", while MP Olivia Chow referred to it as a "total whitewash" and accused the Conservative government of doing a "complete about face" on the issue.

==== Expo 2015 ====
In April 2005, Miller encouraged council to begin work on a bid to host the Expo 2015 world fair. He argued that the event would assist the city's plans for waterfront renewal, and would "show Toronto to the world". Council voted 37-2 to launch a bid in May 2006. The bid collapsed in November 2006, when the federal, provincial and municipal governments failed to reach agreement on who would cover potential losses. Miller refused to blame either level of government for the failed bid, although councillor Brian Ashton argued that the province was mostly to blame.

==== Power plant ====
Miller and former TWRC chair Robert Fung criticized the provincial government's plan to build a large power plant in Toronto's waterfront area, and urged the province to build a smaller facility in its place. Then Ontario Premier Dalton McGuinty argued that the plant would be necessary to meet Toronto's energy needs.

==== Other investments ====
In October 2005, Miller announced $70 million in waterfront investments over five years, dedicated toward new boardwalks, promenades, public places and related attractions. HtO, Toronto's first urban beach, was started in late 2005.

=== Fiscal policy ===
Following his election, Miller appointed conservative councillor David Soknacki as Toronto's budget chief. Although Miller and Soknacki are from different ideological backgrounds, they were political allies in managing the city's finances. Toronto's budget shortfall when Miller assumed office was $344 million. There was a general agreement among local politicians and political analysts that the city needed to increase its residential property tax base. Miller promised to hold such increases to 3 per cent per year.

Miller's first budget was passed by city council in late April 2004, by a vote of 29-10. The city eliminated its previous shortfall while increasing spending by 6 per cent, and keeping residential property taxes increases at 3 per cent and business and industrial property taxes to 1.5 per cent The city's total operating budget for the year was $6.7 billion.

Miller engaged in a scaled-back consultation process prior to delivering his second budget in 2005. Following months of difficult negotiations, the city passed a balanced budget by taking $19.8 million from its reserve funds. Soknacki acknowledged that this was a difficult decision, and Miller's administration argued that the provincial government had increased Toronto's budgetary difficulties by not providing $72.3 million for provincially mandated social programs. During the late stages of negotiations, provincial Municipal Affairs Minister John Gerretsen suggested that the city could make up for its budgetary shortfall by raising property taxes above 3 per cent. Miller rejected this advice. The total operating budget for the year was $7.1 billion, with residential property tax increases again held to 3 per cent and business and industry property tax increases held to 1.5 per cent. Increased funds were provided to policing, transit, parks and social programs. Miller and Soknacki argued that it was the best possible budget under the circumstances, although it was criticized by several right-wing councillors.

In late 2005, Miller endorsed a policy which shifted a portion of Toronto's property tax burden from businesses and commercial operators to homeowners. Acknowledging that this was a difficult decision, he argued that it was necessary to prevent an exodus of jobs from the city. The decision was endorsed by the Toronto Industry Network. Toronto's capital budget for 2006 was $1.3 billion, and was targeted toward such items as road repairs, police stations and recreation centres.

Miller clashed with Toronto Board of Trade President and CEO Glen Grunwald at a February 2006 budgetary consultation meeting, after Grunwald presented a number of policy measures designed to solve Toronto's budget shortfall. Grunwald's recommendations included reducing spending on non-priority items, increasing user fees, privatizing some services and implementing the auditor general's 800 suggestions. Miller criticized the suggestions as "poorly researched", and said that the Board of Trade presentation "didn't befit the role they have as city builders."

In January 2006, there were media reports that Toronto was facing a $532 million shortfall on its operating budget. To promote cost-cutting, Miller and Soknacki encouraged the city to adopt a "zero-based budgeting" approach, wherein all city departments begin with zero authorized funds and are required to defend all proposed expenditures. The city later announced a hiring freeze. Early fears of significant tax increases were allayed by significant provincial investment in the city. Led by Miller, council passed a $7.6 billion operating budget by a vote of 27-17, again holding residential tax increases to 3 per cent and business tax increases to 1 per cent. The budget contained new money to hire police officers and bus drivers.

David Soknacki did not run for reelection in 2006. After the election, Shelley Carroll was appointed as the city's new budget chief. The city introduced $7.8 billion operating budget with a 3.8 per cent property tax increase in 2007; Miller argued that the increase was necessary for the city's expenses. Miller has also pushed for new municipal taxes (mostly "sin taxes") and parking fees under the new City of Toronto Act.

Based upon a 2007 city report, Miller proposed imposing a $60 vehicle-registration tax and a 1.5 per cent land transfer tax, which would be expected to generate $354 million. He argued that the new measures were essential to sustaining the city's budget, without reducing services or raising property taxes. The Canadian Taxpayers Federation and Toronto Board of Trade were opposed, with the latter warning that the proposals would have a negative economic impact on businesses. Miller asserted that residents support the notion of increased taxes as long as the money is being used properly. A survey conducted by the Environics Research Group showed that 70 per cent of respondents supported a cut in expenditures rather than new taxes. A similar number also preferred that the proposals to be debated in the 2010 municipal election before being implemented, as Miller did not mention new taxes during the 2006 campaign. On July 16, council voted 23-22 to defer debating the measures until after the October 2007 provincial election. Miller denied that it was a personal defeat, while Councillor Case Ootes, who led the opposition to the measures, described it as a "wake-up call" to Miller that residents wanted spending curbed.

In the aftermath, Miller immediately proposed several drastic service cuts with the stated intention of saving $100 million from the operating budget. These measures included closing the Sheppard Subway line, cancelling underused bus routes, and scrapping renovations and extra staff to the mayor's office. Miller argued that these were the only responsible steps that Toronto could take to prevent a financial crisis. This drew criticism from several councillors and columnists, with provincial Finance Minister Greg Sorbara attacking the cuts as "quick, perhaps poorly thought out decisions". While they acknowledged the city was faced with a significant budget crisis, they described Miller's announcements as a political ploy, citing his initial move to go to the media instead of calling special session to discuss the cuts, with Brian Ashton suggesting that Miller was punishing councillors that did not support the new taxes.

Miller dismissed Ashton from the executive committee for being the lone member to vote for the deferral of the new taxes. The committee is part of the new "strong mayor" system where key issues are dealt with before being brought to full council. The stated intention was to streamline the decision-making process, but Ashton and Ootes have criticized Miller for treating it as a cabinet and limiting debate with the whole council. Ashton argued that Miller did little to persuade skeptical councillors and the public of the need for new taxes.

Under Miller's direction, City Manager Shirley Hoy implemented $34-million in service cuts to the 2007 budget in August 2007 without seeking council approval. Miller's spokesperson defended the move, saying "we've got a serious financial shortfall that has to be addressed". The North York and Etobicoke community councils passed motions, by 9-1 and 6-1 majorities respectively, asking Toronto council to stop its plan to close community centres on Mondays and delay the opening of ice rinks. The North York motion was tabled by David Shiner, but two allies of Miller, Howard Moscoe and John Filion voted for it, with Shelley Carroll as the lone dissenter. Based upon interviews, a majority of councillors are expected to vote to reverse the controversial cuts at the next meeting scheduled for September 26. Ashton suggested that "[Miller]'s grip is slipping" and "It's like the emperor is doing a slow striptease". An arbitrator later ruled that the library closures violated the collective bargaining agreement with the union.

Miller has since pushed to have the two tax measures implemented. An Environics Research Group for real estate and construction groups showing that 62 per cent were against the measures, while 85 per cent thought that Miller's campaign at fairtaxes.ca either had no effect on their support for the new taxes or turned them against. Miller pointed out that two-thirds of 30,000 hits to the website were in favour of the plan. He also argued that at neighbourhood meetings, most initial questions were not about taxes but rather about service improvements. The measures were passed on October 23, 2007 by a majority of 26-19 and 25-20.

=== Transit policy ===
Miller took part in negotiations with the federal and provincial governments during 2004, which resulted in one billion dollars in additional funding being allocated for the TTC over five years. The city also received an additional $70 million in up-front provincial funding in 2004 to forestall a fare increase.

In late 2004, the provincial government of Dalton McGuinty announced that it would provide $355 million in provincial gas tax revenues for the TTC over three years. Miller welcomed this investment, but later criticized the McGuinty government for including a planned cash bailout in early 2005 as part of its larger grant, rather than as a separate cash investment. Miller's first TTC operating budget in 2004 was $219 million.

With Miller's permission, the TTC approved a small fare increase in early 2005. The price of adult tickets and tokens was increased by ten cents, while adult cash fare was increased 25 cents. The TTC mitigated this change by introducing a weekly $30 pass that could be transferred among several users. TTC chair Howard Moscoe said that the rise was unfortunate, but argued that it was "basically an inflationary increase".

Miller endorsed the creation of a streetcar right-of-way along St. Clair Avenue, a six-lane arterial road within the city, in accordance with the recommendations of the TTC ridership plan. The right-of-way project passed council by a vote of 36-7 in September 2004, but triggered some local opposition. Supporters argue that the project will make public transit more efficient, and set an important precedent for public transit expansion. Opponents, especially in the Dufferin Street business community, have criticized the plan on the grounds that it will reduce customer parking during rush hour. Other opponents, including the Canadian Automobile Association have argued that the right-of-way will increase automobile congestion, since the proposal bans left turns and may divert traffic to neighbourhood streets. Supporters have questioned this latter claim, claiming instead that the previous right-of-way streetcar implemented on Spadina Avenue was a success. Former Toronto mayor John Sewell, a long-standing supporter of public transit, has emerged as a vocal opponent of the right-of-way plan.

A group called Save-Our-St. Clair (SOS) took its objections to the Ontario Superior Court in 2005, and won a panel ruling which forced a halt to the project in October. The city subsequently cited a potential bias on the part of one of the judges, and asked that the ruling be set aside. The panel voted 2-1 to recuse themselves in November 2005, and so overturned their previous decision. In February 2006, the Ontario Divisional Court ruled against SOS and gave the city authority to move forward with the project.

Miller also supports the creation of rapid transit bus service lines throughout the city, arguing that these will provide the benefits of subway travel at a much lower expense. He has promoted the TTC Ridership Growth Strategy, a plan which aims to increase ridership and reduce overcrowding.

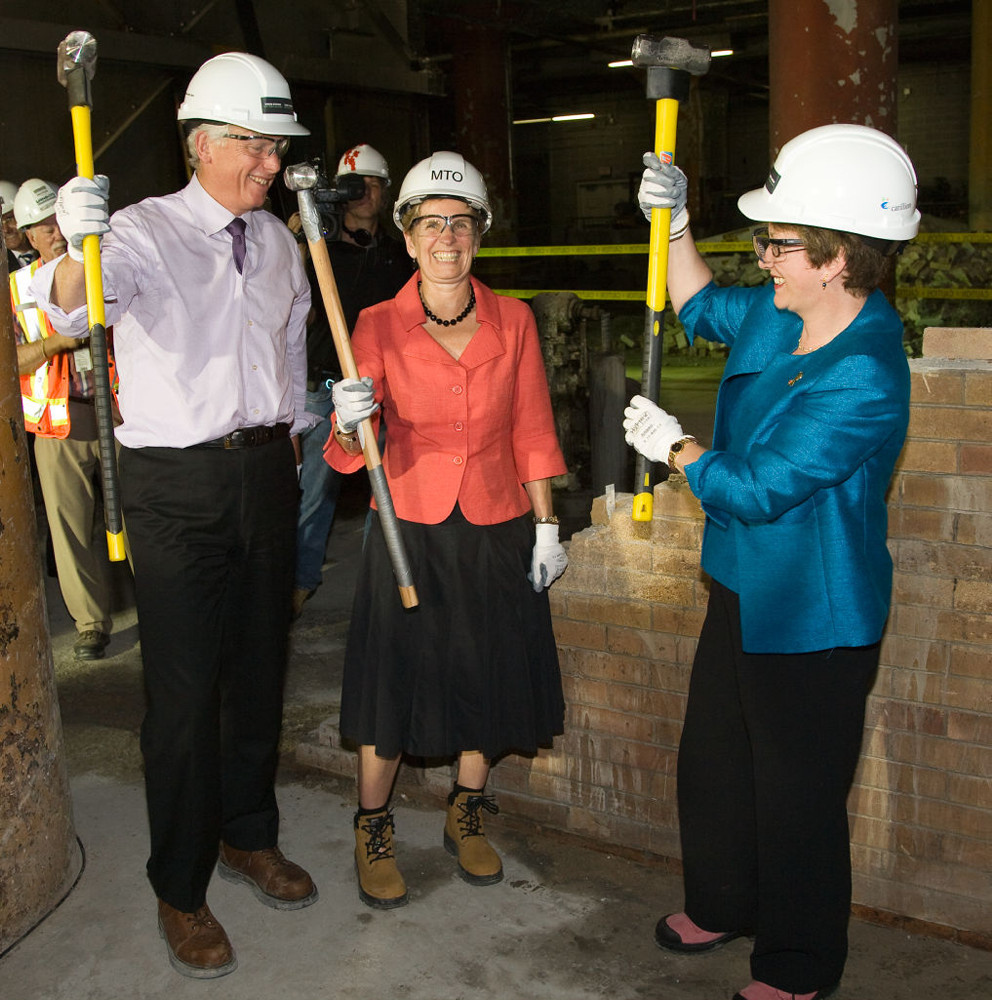
Miller (left) with Kathleen Wynne (centre), at a Union Station Revitalization groundbreaking event, 2010.

Miller strongly criticized a one-day wildcat strike by TTC workers in late May 2006, describing the job action as "illegal, unlawful and absolutely unacceptable".

Miller endorsed the TTC's plan to purchase new subway cars from Bombardier, which awarded a contract for construction of the cars via a non-competitive bid. Some members of council criticized the deal, noting that other city departments require competitive bids on contracts of this size. They also cited a study from rival company Siemens that its proposal could have saved the city up to $100 million (Bombardier officials have questioned this figure). Miller and TTC chair Howard Moscoe have argued that the Bombardier contract was awarded fairly, and that it will provide the city with both affordable subway cars and local parts-supply employment. Miller described the deal as "good for city taxpayers and good for Ontario". City council approved the deal in September 2006 by a vote of 25-18.

In November 2006, Miller suggested a parking lot surcharge to encourage public transit. He also proposed a Simcoe Street extension to provide a downtown link to the waterfront.

Miller was made a member of the new Metrolinx (then known as Greater Toronto Transit Authority) in early 2007.

In mid-March 2007, Miller and the TTC unveiled a fifteen-year plan, called Transit City, to construct a light-rail network linking almost every neighbourhood within the city. The plan is conditional on funding from other levels of government. The government of Ontario has committed itself to funding two-thirds of the project. He has also announced a plan to build more than 1,000 kilometres of bike lanes by 2012.

=== Police issues ===
==== Police budget ====
After assuming office, Miller became involved in the long-standing and polarizing debates over Toronto's police budget, the city's largest single expenditure. The city had previously approved several large increases for the police during Mel Lastman's tenure as mayor. The force's 2004 request was for $691.4 million, an increase of $57 million from the previous year. Municipal budget chief David Soknacki initially requested that the police cut $14.2 million from their request, a figure which Chief of Police Julian Fantino argued would jeopardize essential services. After a lengthy and sometimes heated debate, the council voted 40-5 on April 21, 2004, to approve a police budget of $679.1 million.

Police spending has increased by $117 million under Miller's administration, and 450 new officers have been put on the streets. In November 2006, Miller stood with Prime Minister Stephen Harper and Premier Dalton McGuinty to announce tougher bail conditions for persons accused of gun crimes. Miller and McGuinty both support Harper's plan for a "reverse-onus" provision, in which persons accused of gun crimes will be required to demonstrate why they should not be held in custody before a trial. Harper has rejected Miller's call for a ban on handguns.

Later in the year, Miller became involved in a labour dispute between the Police Services Board and the Toronto Police Association. The board, led by councillor Pam McConnell, wanted to save revenue by clawing back existing rates of retention pay and eliminating lunch-hour pay for officers on inactive duty during compressed shifts. The police association argued that the proposals would cause an exodus of officers and result in lower pay for officers working compressed schedules. After a series of acrimonious meetings, negotiations broke down and the association entered a work-to-rule campaign by refusing to patrol or hand out fines.

During the course of this dispute, the association printed full-page advertisements in the Toronto Star and Toronto Sun asking Miller to become personally involved through his role as a board member. It also issued an open letter which asked if Miller wanted to be remembered "as the mayor who was tough on crime, or the mayor who was tough on cops". On October 31, Miller informed the media that he was working to bring both sides together. A tentative deal was signed in early November, with reports that board had compromised on retention pay. One published report suggests that Ralph Lean, a leading Miller fundraiser, played an instrumental role in ending the dispute through private negotiations with former association head Craig Bromell.

==== Police Chief ====
In June 2004, the deadlocked Toronto Police Services Board voted not to renew Fantino's contract as chief. The next month, city council rejected a motion from Fantino's supporters which sought to overturn the decision. Miller's position was that a full council debate on the matter would have violated the Police Services Act. Miller's refusal to allow a debate drew criticism from the Toronto Sun who ran a cartoon comparing Miller to Adolf Hitler. (The paper's editor apologized after Miller and the Canadian Jewish Congress condemned the cartoon.)

Former councillor Rob Davis led a protest march in support of Fantino. Some journalists and Ontario Finance Minister Greg Sorbara, whose government shortly afterwards appointed Fantino as Commissioner of Emergency Management, speculated that Miller played an influential behind-the-scenes role in the board's decision not to renew Fantino's contract. Miller denied this, saying that he would have preferred the board to reserve any decision until September.

In early 2005, Miller argued that Fantino's replacement as the police chief should revamp the city's scheduling practices. He argued that the existing system was designed for the convenience of officers living outside of Toronto, and should be revised to permit more officers on the streets during important periods. The following month, he unexpectedly sided with the Toronto Police Association against the Toronto Police Services Board in opposing mandatory drug testing for officers.

In March 2005, Miller asked of the Police Services Board that he be granted a participatory role in the selection of the next police chief. He argued that he could provide "a voice that represents all Torontonians rather than that of a particular stakeholder", and said that he would recuse himself from formal deliberations and the final decision. Board member Case Ootes responded that Miller's request amounted to political interference, and said there was "some contradiction" between the request and Miller's earlier refusal to engage in public debate over Fantino's removal. The board turned down Miller's request. By way of compromise, he was allowed to see the board's shortlist of candidates and propose interview questions for applicants.

Fantino was succeeded on a temporary basis by Mike Boyd, a retired deputy chief who had worked closely with Miller when the latter was still a councillor. In April 2005, the board chose Bill Blair as Fantino's permanent replacement. There was some media speculation that the mayor's office would have preferred Boyd for the position, though Miller denied this. In an effort to move beyond previous hostilities, Miller awarded Fantino with the Key to the City on April 14, 2005. During the ceremony, Miller described Fantino as "a man of integrity who has done tremendous work to help keep Toronto safe."

Miller indicated that he would take a seat on the Police Services Board halfway through his first term, and replaced Ootes during the city's mid-term shuffle of positions in May 2005. Deputy Mayor Joe Pantalone indicated that Ootes was replaced because his right-wing policy views were inconsistent with the aims of Miller's administration.

==== Anti-crime measures ====
In February 2004, Miller introduced an anti-crime package highlighted by increased community outreach programs and job opportunities for at-risk youth. He also appointed Ontario Chief Justice Roy McMurtry to head a panel on gun-related crime in the city. Fantino described Miller's plan as "holistic", and gave it his support. Some councillors expressed concern that the measures would not be effective against serious criminals, and Etobicoke councillor Doug Holyday suggested that Miller should instead lobby the federal government for tougher laws. Nonetheless, council unanimously approved Miller's plan on March 1, 2004.

After a series of gang-related shootings in summer 2005, Miller argued that lax American gun laws were creating unsafe conditions in Toronto. He noted that half the firearms in Toronto originated in America. He also announced that most of a $4.3 million police budget surplus would go toward hiring 150 new officers. He had previously opposed hiring large numbers of new officers when campaigning for mayor, at a time when gang-related shootings in the city were fewer and less pronounced.

Some journalists noted similarities between Miller's revised policy and that proposed by John Tory in 2003. Miller also called upon Toronto's business leaders to target street crime by providing jobs for unemployed youth; one year later, he was able to report increased hirings in both the public and private sectors. Some councillors, including Michael Thompson, suggested that Miller waited too long before reacting to reports of increased violence.

==== Corruption ====
In April 2004, a small number of Toronto officers were charged with aiding figures connected to the Hells Angels biker gang. Shortly thereafter, Miller was overheard saying "Is your police force in jail? Mine is." in a private aside to the lord mayor of London, who was in Toronto to announce a new partnership between the cities. Miller explained that he made the comment in order to introduce the scandal to his guest, following an awkward press scrum which the Lord Mayor walked away from after several questions about the local controversy. He later apologized, saying "the allegations are serious and I shouldn't have referred to them with humour". After the mayor's initial comment, Fantino was quoted on the CP24 program The Chief as saying, "I feel like someone has driven a stake through my heart". He later accepted Miller's apology.

==== Immigration ====
In February 2006, the Toronto Police Services Board unanimously supported a policy to have officers refrain from asking witnesses and victims of crime about their immigration status. The purpose of this policy change was to ensure that illegal immigrants will not be intimidated from reporting serious crimes to the police. Both Miller and Blair supported the policy.

==== Crime ====
Miller and Blair also opposed efforts by the Guardian Angels vigilante group to establish a base in Toronto. Their opposition failed to stop the Angels, who have since initiated patrols in the city.

A poll taken by Ipsos-Reid in October 2005 showed that the mayor, council, police and judges all received low to middling grades from the Toronto public in their handling of increased gang activity. The poll gave Police Chief Bill Blair and the Toronto Police Services a C average grade, followed by community leaders (C−), Miller (D+), city council (D), the Attorney General of Ontario (D), and the judges and justices of the Peace (D).

=== Environmental policy ===
Shortly after assuming office, Miller introduced a $3 million "clean and beautiful" city initiative to involve ordinary Torontonians in the cleanup of their city. A more comprehensive plan was subsequently introduced and approved by council later in the year, allocating an extra $21 million over three years to pay for various cleanups. The "clean and beautiful" project was allocated $6.4 million in 2005, with much of the money directed toward projects such as litter pickup and cleanups of neglected public space.

Miller announced in May 2004 that Toronto would install over 2,000 energy-efficient traffic signal lights. He also endorsed the Deep lake water cooling project, in which water from Lake Ontario is used to cool office buildings in downtown Toronto. In early 2005, he and Chicago Mayor Richard M. Daley made a joint address to the Great Lakes Congressional Breakfast in Washington, D.C. Miller was the first Canadian mayor to address the meeting.

A municipal "litter audit" in September 2006 found that the city was 40 per cent cleaner from the previous year. The survey chose 298 random sites throughout the city, and measured the amount of litter in each area.

The City of Toronto is introducing a 9 per cent water rate increase for 2007, with similar increases expected for the foreseeable future. Miller's administration argues that the money is needed to fix aging water and sewer pipes.

In March 2007, Miller unveiled a plan to reduce the city's greenhouse gas emissions by 30 per cent by 2020, and by 80 per cent in 2050 (based on a 1990 baseline). Miller has argued that the plan is viable, and is based on similar initiatives in the European Union.

==== Garbage disposal ====
When Miller was elected mayor, Toronto's garbage had for several years been shipped to Carleton Farms Landfill in the U.S. state of Michigan, through a contract with the firm Republic Services. This arrangement was strongly criticized by politicians in both Michigan and Ontario, citing the undesirability and accidents of trucks passing through. Opponents argued that it would not be sustainable in the long term, with U.S. politicians lobbying to close off the border to garbage exports, while the Southwestern Ontario Trash coalition of cities voiced concerns that they would be forced to bear Toronto's garbage in the event of a border closure. Some politicians, including John Tory and Dalton McGuinty, supported the option of local trash incineration as it would reduce dependence on landfill space. Miller opposed this, citing both cost concerns and a threat to the environment. He also reiterated his opposition to shipping Toronto's garbage to the Adams Mine landfill near Kirkland Lake in Northern Ontario. In 2005, Miller led the city in renewing its contract with Republic for five years.

In 2006, Miller spearheaded a decision for the City of Toronto to purchase Green Lane Environmental Ltd., a large landfill area near St. Thomas in southwestern Ontario. It is believed that this purchase will solve Toronto's waste disposal problems for several years, as the city explores other options for the future. Council voted 26-12 to accept the plan. This was criticized by London Mayor Anne Marie DeCicco-Best and provincial Minister of Colleges and Universities Chris Bentley, as they received no notice of the deal, but they conceded that they could do little to block it.

On September 21, 2006, Toronto Star columnist Royson James suggested that the city had received a better offer for the Green Lane site one year earlier, and failed to act on it. Miller described James's accusation as "categorically false", acknowledging that the city received a conditional proposal in 2005 but denying that any formal offer was made or that a price was negotiated. He added that a deal would have been impossible, as the province had not granted its approval at the time. Green Lane has upheld Miller's version of events. This controversy notwithstanding, James has written in support of the Green Lane purchase. The deal was completed in December 2006, with Toronto paying $220 million for the site.

During Miller's tenure, Toronto has also expanded its Green Bin recycling program, a composting project designed to reduce the amount of waste that Toronto ships to landfills. The project was initiated in Etobicoke in 2002, and the other areas of Toronto have been added since Miller's election as mayor. Green Bin became citywide in October 2005 when North York was included in the program. In marking the achievement, Miller described Toronto as "a North American leader in recycling and composting programs". Toronto currently recycles and composts 40 per cent of the garbage collected by the city; it plans to increase this figure to 60 per cent in 2010, and 100 per cent in 2012.

Miller reiterated his opposition to trash incineration in the 2006 mayoral campaign. The final legal hurdle to the Green Lane purchase was resolved in March 2007, and the deal was signed in early April.

=== Housing policy ===
Miller convened a summit on affordable housing in late February 2004, bringing in representatives from all three levels of government. As the summit was formally convened, he secured $24 million in funding from the provincial government to construct more than 900 units of housing for low-to-middle income earners. Council voted later in the year to approve $13.6 million for new housing projects, amounting to 312 new homes. Miller's housing advisor, Sean Goetz-Gadon, argued in 2004 that Toronto could accommodate 10,000 subsidized housing units for both people experiencing homelessness and those at risk of homelessness.

Miller brought forward a series of measures to provide shelter and warmth for Toronto's homeless population during the winter months in 2004, including a decision to set up an emergency centre before Christmas. The shelter had 80 beds, and provided reference services. During the previous Lastman administration, the city had responded to specific emergencies rather than determining a strategy in advance.

In early 2005, Miller helped steer a motion through council which banned the people from sleeping in Nathan Phillips Square. He said that the plan was intended as a "nudge" to push people in the direction of finding shelters, and added that no one would be arrested. The initiative entitled Streets to Homes also called for the creation of 1,000 new affordable housing units per year, and the creation of another emergency shelter. By December 2005, the city had helped 533 people experiencing homelessness find permanent apartments.

In May 2005, Miller's administration presided over the approval of 6,500 new units of housing on brownfield land near the Don River. The project, originally called Ataratiri, had been delayed for 17 years. Two months later, Miller led council in creating a new committee to fast-track the approval of affordable housing. In February 2006, Miller began a comprehensive housing renewal project in Toronto's Regent Park area.

In January 2007, Miller criticized an Ontario Municipal Board decision which allowed a high-rise project on Queen Street West. The area is known for art galleries and low-rent studios, and Miller has argued that high-rise construction will compromise the city's creative sector. He later introduced a motion directing staff to "pursue all available options" against the OMB's decision. The motion was passed by a vote of 33-11 in February 2007.

The provincial government of Dalton McGuinty announced in February 2007 that it would make $392 million available for affordable housing. Toronto is expected to receive the largest share of the revenue.

=== Culture ===
Miller created a new Toronto Film Board in November 2004 to improve the economic prospects of the city's multibillion-dollar film industry. He was himself designated as the board's chair, and convened its first meeting in February 2005. Toronto also received $500,000 from the federal government for cultural spending in 2005, and Miller led Toronto in hosting a year-long festival of the arts in 2006. He introduced "Toronto Unlimited" as Toronto's new promotional slogan in the summer of 2005.

In late 2005, Miller helped convince the city to invest $9.8 million in a new soccer-specific stadium at Exhibition Place, which was later named BMO Field. In March 2006, he helped introduce an "historic" Wi-Fi network to Toronto.

=== Intergovernmental relations ===
==== Federal government ====
Miller welcomed the arrival of Paul Martin's Government in late 2003, claiming that Martin was the first prime minister to directly address municipal issues. He endorsed the Martin government's "New Deal for Cities" plan in February 2004, and supported Martin's pledge to waive the Goods and Services Tax for cities. He was a prominent supporter of the Martin government's 2005 budget, and argued against bringing down the minority Liberal government to force a summer election. In June 2005, Miller welcomed a federal commitment to provide $1.9 billion to Ontario municipalities over five years from federal gas tax revenues.

Miller convened a meeting of Canada's major urban mayors in January 2004, and argued at the summit that Canadian cities needed enhanced powers of governance to deal with a variety modern challenges. In September of the same year, Miller hosted a meeting of ten major city Canadian mayors, examining the issue of federal gas tax revenues.

In February 2004, Miller called for greater coordination between all three levels of government in overseeing patterns of immigration within Canada. In early 2005, the City of Toronto earmarked up to $5 million to assist about 2,000 refugees who were expected to arrive from tsunami-ravaged areas of Southeast Asia.

Miller did not support any party in the 2004 federal election, endorsing four individual candidates: New Democrats Peggy Nash and Olivia Chow, and Liberals John Godfrey and Borys Wrzesnewskyj. In 2005, when federal Social Development Minister Ken Dryden was planning a national childcare strategy, Miller spoke in favour of a system based around public delivery.

Miller endorsed only two candidates in the 2006 federal election: Liberal John Godfrey and New Democrat Peggy Nash. Unsuccessful NDP candidate and former provincial MPP Marilyn Churley blamed Miller for withholding support from other New Democrats. According to one report, Churley briefly mused challenging him for mayor in 2006 before deciding not to do so. Miller supported Paul Martin's call for a total ban on handguns, and urged Martin to bring forward tougher bail conditions on persons accused of gun crimes.

Monte Solberg of the Conservative Party met with Miller in June 2005, and told Miller that the Conservative Party would honour existing agreements for waterfront renewal if elected. Despite ideological differences, Miller commended Stephen Harper, who was elected as Martin's successor in 2006, for taking urban issues seriously. Miller supported the appointment of Lawrence Cannon as Minister for Communities in February 2006, and tried without success to persuade the Harper government against eliminating Canada's national child-care plan. He expressed mixed views about the Harper government's first budget, noting that it allowed Toronto to construct 1,000 units of affordable housing while also expressing concern about cuts to child-care spaces.

In early March 2007, the Harper government introduced a $1.5 billion plan to assist Toronto's public transit system and expand provincial highways. Miller welcomed the new revenue, saying that it was a step in the direction of permanent funding. Miller later described Harper's 2007 budget as a "step backwards", criticizing its lack of revenues for long-term transit funding and permanent infrastructure. Globe and Mail columnist John Barber, however, has noted that this was not echoed by other city mayors and described the One Cent Campaign as "wishful thinking". With Dalton McGuinty's 2007 provincial budget also being similarly dismissive of Miller's demands, Barber suggested that the city could realistically solve its problems by making use of its new taxing powers.

During the 2008 federal election campaign, Miller declared that the Green Party of Canada was the only one to directly address city issues such as transit and infrastructure. He went on to say that he wasn't endorsing any particular party.

On June 18, 2009, Miller requested federal funding from the Harper government's $12-billion stimulus spending, for new streetcars in the Transit City initiative. The city faced a deadline of June 27, 2009 to commit to the $1.2-billion deal signed with Bombardier for the 204 streetcars. To put pressure on the Harper government to come up with its one-third share of the cost, Miller and Premier Dalton McGuinty made an announcement in Thunder Bay to fund the new streetcars. However, federal Transport Minister John Baird rejected the request outright. Baird stated that streetcar funding clearly failed to meet the stimulus bill's requirement that the funds would have to be spent in 2 years, as that was meant to put money into the economy quickly to buoy demand and staving off deflation, while Transit City would have been a long-term project. Also the stimulus required funds to be spent on infrastructure in the municipality where the application is granted to create local employment, whereas the jobs created by building streetcars would be in Thunder Bay and not Toronto. Baird noted that Toronto was the only one out of 2,700 applicants that didn't meet the eligibility criteria.

===== One Cent campaign =====
Miller formally launched a campaign for Canada's cities to receive one of six cents charged on every dollar under the existing Goods and Services Tax at the Toronto City Summit Alliance's Toronto Summit 2007. He has argued that the transfer will provide a reliable and permanent source of funding for cities. A website called www.onecentnow.ca has been set up to promote the campaign. Karen Stintz and several other councillors criticized Miller for spending $100,000 on the program before it was debated on and approved by council, and suggesting that he was advancing his personal agenda. Miller's office argued that council approval was unnecessary for the initiative, as it had appeared in his campaign platform.

Federal Finance Minister Jim Flaherty has indicated that he does not support the proposal, stating that he would be "interested in reducing taxes for all Canadians and directly to Canadians, not through other governments." Liberal opposition leader Stéphane Dion endorsed a permanent gas tax transfer to municipalities, but stopped short of endorsing Miller's GST proposal. Liberal MP John Godfrey said the proposal needed to be further defined before any party would support it.

Critics of the one cent campaign said that it was losing support, citing declining petition signatures and no federal politicians on side, and suggested that residents have become desensitized to Miller's frequent calls for outside funding to fix the city's problems. Miller remained optimistic, saying that it was too early to judge the success of the program, and argued that he had successfully put back on the agenda the idea that national success was linked to cities.

In early May 2007, mayors from Canada's 22 largest cities gave their unanimous support to the one-cent plan.

Mississauga mayor Hazel McCallion initially expressed pessimism over Miller's 'One-cent now' campaign, stating that "I can assure you our citizens [of Mississauga] can't point out to us where there's a lot of waste. Toronto, unfortunately, has that situation, in which their citizens are saying it, as well as their board of trade has been saying it and even their own councillors are saying it". Denzil Minnan-Wong compared the two mayors, saying "Hazel McCallion runs a tight ship. David Miller's ship has leaks all over the place," and some commentators suggested that Toronto would have a difficult time making a credible case to the federal government for funding. She unveiled her own plan known as 'Cities Now!' to get federal funding for municipal infrastructure. However, McCallion's proposal did not receive support during a meeting with fifteen regional mayors, and she agreed to support Miller's campaign.

==== Provincial government ====
Miller's relations with the provincial government of Dalton McGuinty have generally been cordial, although the two governments have had disputes over finances. Miller argues that the former provincial government of Mike Harris burdened the city with disproportionately high service costs, and has asked the provincial government to re-assume responsibility for some of these programs. As of 2007, Toronto pays $730 million for services that were provincial responsibilities before Harris came to power (Harris stated that the downloads were necessary to reduce the provincial deficit, and to compensate for reduced transfer payments from the federal government of Jean Chrétien). McGuinty has shown some sympathy to Toronto's position, but has also argued that the city has not taken sufficient responsibility for its own budgetary shortfalls.

In early 2004, McGuinty told reporters that Miller's government had asked for more money in transfer payments than the province could provide. McGuinty's first budget, introduced later in the year, nevertheless honoured a commitment to provide municipalities including Toronto with a portion of gasoline taxes. Miller later criticized the McGuinty government's proposal to negotiate future projects with the Association of Municipalities of Ontario rather than with individual municipalities, arguing that this would weaken Toronto's negotiating ability. John Gerretsen, the municipal affairs minister, argued that the AMO arrangement would still permit the province to negotiate with Toronto to specific issues. Under Miller's direction, Toronto withdrew from the AMO in 2005.

Miller had criticized the provincial government's previous authority over Toronto as constitutionally outdated and a barrier to economic growth, noting that simple changes like parking levies and tax-free transit passes needed approval from the provincial government. He gave his full support to the McGuinty government's City of Toronto Act, which grants a variety of new powers to the city. In 2005, he wrote that the City of Toronto Act will "give the city freedom and flexibility to deliver services creatively and effectively", and that it "will essentially be Toronto's constitution". The act was formally proclaimed on January 1, 2007. Soon after, Toronto used its new powers to delegate local matters to community councils, and announced plans for a Lobbying Control Framework. Recently, Miller has used the Act to justify the $600,000 cost of hiring new staff for his office, saying that his position has increased responsibilities.

Miller strongly supported the McGuinty government's 2006 budget, which included an immediate $200 million boost for Toronto.

Miller later criticized the McGuinty government's 2007 budget. He supported the province's anti-poverty initiatives, but also argued that it was refusing to "pay its bills", and said that Toronto's budgetary problems were the result of $500 million in social service costs mandated by the provincial government. During a later discussion, provincial finance minister Greg Sorbara declined to help the city to fix its $71 million shortfall, saying that "he doesn't have a mandate to fix this". Miller has since moved to have the city sue the province over the shortfall.

=== Political reforms ===
Miller appointed David Mullan as Toronto's first Integrity Commissioner in July 2004. In the same month, he brought forward a motion calling for council to ban corporate and union donations to municipal candidates. He later introduced a comprehensive plan to restructure Toronto's bureaucracy, highlighted by the elimination of three $200,000 a year positions. In making the changes, Miller described Toronto's existing bureaucracy as "incomprehensible to Torontonians" and in need of reform. The package passed council by a vote of 33-9. Miller tried to create a mandatory lobbyist registry in September 2006, but council voted to refer the matter for further study.

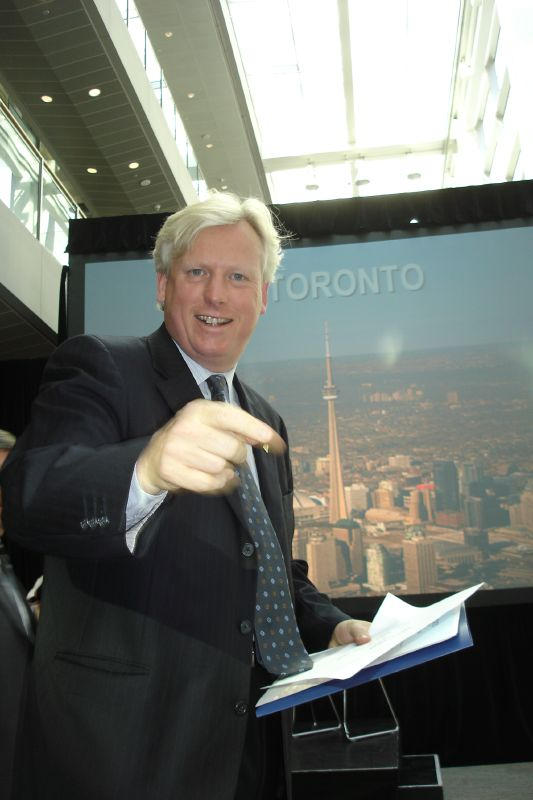
Miller in 2006

In February 2007, council endorsed Miller's lobbyist registry by a vote of 33-9. The new bylaw applies to unions, except in discussions over contracts and health and safety issues.

Miller supports the current non-partisan system of municipal government in Toronto. He has opposed suggestions that party politics should be introduced, arguing that this would undermine the consensus nature of municipal government and "creat[e] a group of people who have a duty to oppose". Initially skeptical about the "strong-mayor system", where the mayor holds increased powers relative to other councillors, Miller endorsed a 2005 panel report which gave the mayor additional powers and created a formal city executive. He argued that Toronto needed to restructure itself before getting new powers from the province. Council endorsed the reforms in December 2005.

In May 2006, the provincial government passed legislation to extend municipal terms from three years to four. Miller supported the change, saying that municipal leaders need longer terms of office to carry out their mandate. In June 2006, he led council in approving a measure to permit the mayor to appoint heads of committees. He also introduced a new "Building A Great City website in 2006, allowing Torontonians to follow the development of key issues on city council.

=== Media coverage ===
In early 2004, Miller re-introduced an hour-long call-in television show called The Mayor on CP24. A staff member at the station commented on the difference between the Miller's show and that of his predecessor: "with Miller you receive answers to questions. Lastman's show was just a circus." In the same year, filmmaker Andrew Munger released In Campaign: The Making of A Candidate as a behind-the-scenes look at Miller's 2003 campaign.

Miller was profiled in the April 2006 edition of Vanity Fair magazine, which praised his environmental record.

=== 2006 mayoral campaign ===
Miller reassembled his first mayoral campaign team for his 2006 re-election bid. John Laschinger and Peter Donolo returned in prominent roles, joined by new figures such as Ralph Lean and John Ronson as fundraisers, Dan Tisch as communications chair, and other prominent supporters such as Patrick Gossage, Jane Pepino and Michael Lewis, the brother of Stephen Lewis. David Crombie and former Ontario premier David Peterson were named as honorary co-chairs. Miller highlighted safety issues at his campaign launch, and criticized the federal Conservative government's plans to cancel the national gun registry. He received a qualified endorsement from the Toronto Star newspaper shortly before election day.

Miller's primary opponent was councillor Jane Pitfield. Pitfield criticized city spending, and described Miller the "Billion Dollar Man" for overseeing spending increases of $1.3 billion since 2003. Miller responded that Toronto's share was only $275 million, with the remainder coming from the provincial and federal governments. He later described most of the spending as "new investment we've secured from provincial and federal government to meet the needs of our city in public transit, in housing, or the 58 new child care centres that we've opened in Toronto this month alone, in Toronto's poorest neighbourhoods".

==== Policies ====
Miller outlined his waterfront renewal plan in October 2006, highlighted by 750 acres (3.0 km^{2}) of new public spaces and parks from Scarborough to Etobicoke. While making this announcement, he described the Toronto Port Authority as "a rogue agency that is not accountable to anyone" and renewed his criticism of the expanding island airport. His environmental strategy outlines a four-year neighbourhood beautification program in each of Toronto's neighbourhoods.

Miller called for more dedicated bus lines and increased light rapid transit, with a corresponding de-emphasis on subway construction. He has also called for a Universal Transit Pass (or "U-pass"), to encourage transit use among college and university students. He promised to continue to limit tax increases to the rate of inflation, and announced $13 million to improve community safety in thirteen troubled neighbourhoods.

In his campaign platform, released November 1, 2006, Miller promised 4,000 units of affordable housing, a mandatory lobbyist registry, and a further expansion of the green bin program into apartments and condominiums. He said that he would negotiate with the federal and provincial governments for a share of the Goods and Services Tax and Provincial Sales Tax, noting that a GST/PST transfer of only one cent would increase Toronto's annual revenues by $450 million. Miller also called for a National Transit Strategy to fund public transit in Canada's largest cities.

In late October 2006, Miller proposed that Toronto's 200,000 landed immigrants be permitted to vote in municipal elections. Pitfield later indicated her support for the proposal, and Provincial Municipal Affairs Minister John Gerretsen indicated his willingness to examine it after the election.

==== Results ====
Miller consistently led Jane Pitfield in public opinion polls during the campaign, usually by significant margins. Stephen LeDrew, a late entry in the contest, failed to provide a credible challenge. Miller defeated Pitfield 57 per cent to 32 per cent on election day, winning 42 of the city's 44 wards. He used his victory speech to make Toronto's case for a greater share of federal and provincial tax revenues.

=== 2010 election ===
On September 25, 2009, Miller announced that he would not seek a third term as mayor in the 2010 election, citing family reasons. An Ipsos Reid poll earlier that month revealed that almost 8 in 10 Torontonians wanted Miller replaced as mayor, over dissatisfaction at his handling of the 39-day municipal strike. Many of Miller's supporters had defected to other potential candidates, likely to be former Ontario Progressive Conservative leader John Tory or Deputy Premier George Smitherman.

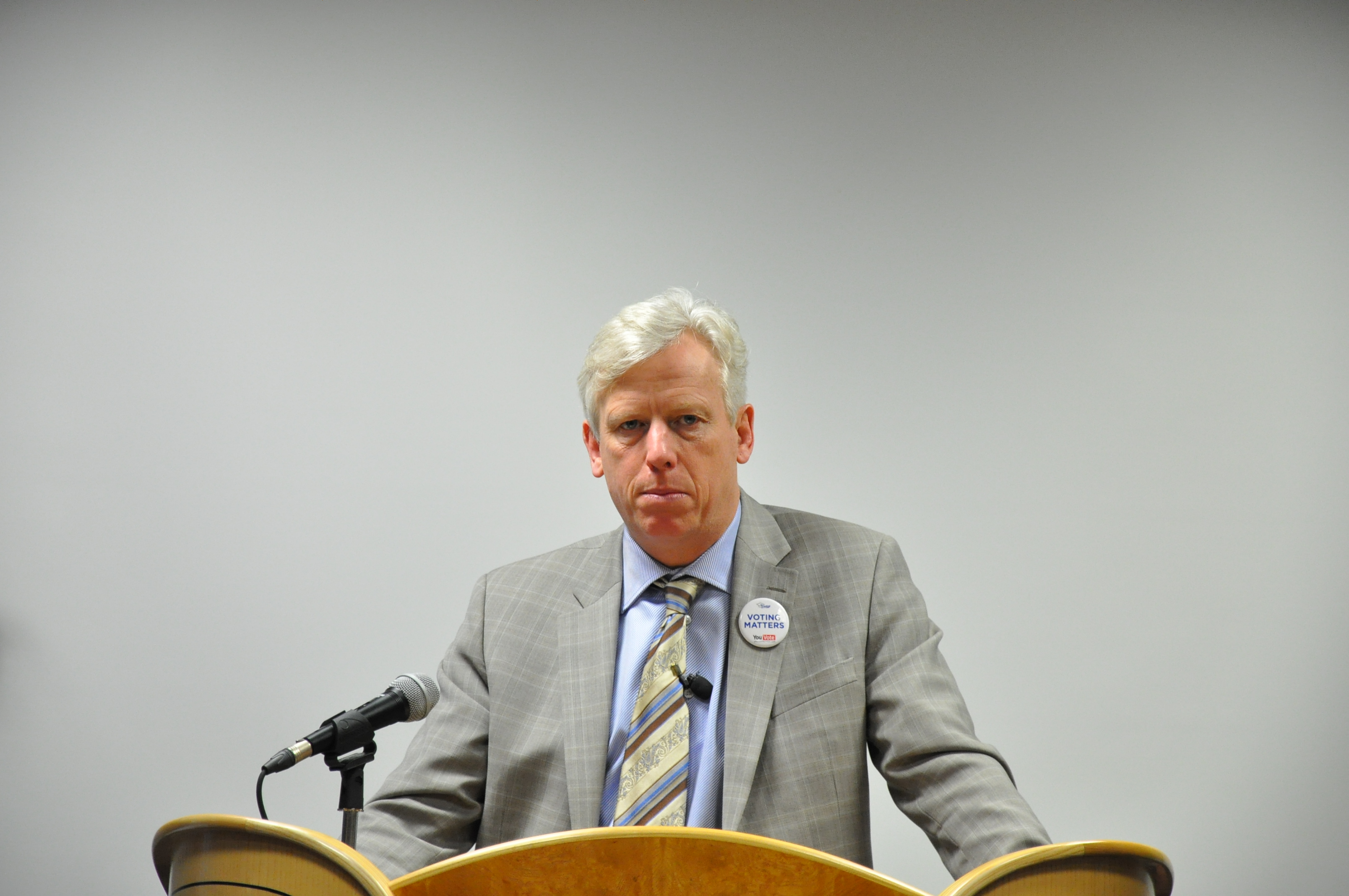
Miller talks at Humber College, March 2010

In early October 2010, Miller gave his endorsement to Deputy Mayor Joe Pantalone, who claimed that he was "no clone of David Miller", but whose platform largely continued the status quo with Miller's policies, in contrast to the other mayoral candidates who advocated sweeping changes. Pantalone was lagging considerably behind Councillor Rob Ford and former Ontario Deputy Premier George Smitherman in polls, and Smitherman dismissed Miller's support of Pantalone saying "If voters wanted the status quo, David Miller would still be in this race." Miller has accused Ford and Smitherman of wanting to "tear down Toronto", and suggested that Smitherman posed the greater danger as mayor. Late in the campaign, Smitherman left a voice-mail with Miller to ask Pantalone to withdraw from the race but Miller never returned the call. (Back in the 2003 mayoral election, Smitherman had worked for the campaign of Barbara Hall, which tried to persuade Miller to drop out of the race.)

Ford was elected mayor with 47.1 per cent of the vote, while Smitherman and Pantalone finished second and third, with 35.6 per cent and 11.7 per cent, respectively.

== Post-mayoral career ==
Following his term as mayor, Miller rejoined the law firm of Aird & Berlis LLP where he specialized in international business and sustainability. He split his time between Toronto and Brooklyn, New York, where he accepted a three-year appointment at the Polytechnic Institute of New York University as Future of Cities Global Fellow to teach courses on finding technological solutions to urban problems. He subsequently served as an advisor on urban issues at the World Bank from 2011 to 2013. In 2013 he was appointed president and CEO of WWF-Canada, the Canadian division of the international World Wildlife Fund.

At the end of 2017, he left his position as CEO of WWF-Canada to become North American director for C40 Cities coalition.

Miller is now the Chair of the Board for B.C. Infrastructure Benefits, a Crown corporation that works to grow and diversify the skilled labour force in British Columbia.

On November 20, 2024 Ontario NDP Leader Marit Stiles announced her appointment of Miller as a Special Advisor on "crafting a new deal for municipalities."

== Electoral record ==
=== Municipal politics ===
2006 Toronto municipal election: Mayor of Toronto
Candidate	Votes	%
David Miller	332,969	56.97
Jane Pitfield	188,932	32.32
Stephen LeDrew	8,078	1.38
35 other candidates	54,508	9.33
Total valid votes	584,484	100.00

For full results, see 2006 Toronto municipal election.

2003 Toronto municipal election: Mayor of Toronto
Candidate	Votes	%
David Miller	299,385	43.26
John Tory	263,189	38.03
Barbara Hall	63,751	9.21
John Nunziata	36,021	5.20
Tom Jakobek	5,277	0.76
39 other candidates	24,462	3.53
Total valid votes	692,085	100.00

For full results, see Results of the 2003 Toronto election.

2000 Toronto municipal election: Councillor, Ward Thirteen
Candidate	Votes	%
(x)David Miller	11,274	61.71
(x)Bill Saundercook	6,995	38.29
Total valid votes	18,269	100.00

1997 Toronto municipal election: Councillor, Ward Nineteen (two members elected)
Candidate	Votes	%
(x)David Miller	13,665	27.64
(x)Chris Korwin-Kuczynski	13,115	26.53
Connie Dejak	8,267	16.72
(x)David Hutcheon	7,437	15.04
Alex Chumak	3,931	7.95
Ed Hooven	1,336	2.70
Walter Melnyk	1,085	2.19
Jorge Van Schouwen	599	1.21
Total valid votes	49,435	100.00

Electors could vote for two candidates in the 1997 election.
The percentages are determined in relation to the total number of votes.

1994 Toronto municipal election: Metro Toronto Councillor, High Park
Candidate	Votes	%
David Miller	7,950	38.03
Andrew Witer	6,845	32.74
Tony Clement	4,722	22.59
Caryl Manning	1,390	6.65
Total valid votes	20,907	100.00

1991 Toronto municipal election: Metro Toronto Councillor, High Park
Candidate	Votes	%
(x)Derwyn Shea	13,706	58.75
David Miller	8,079	34.63
Yaqoob Khan	1,544	6.62
Total valid votes	23,329	100.00

The 1991 results are taken from a Toronto Star newspaper report on November 13, 1991, with 192 of 196 polls having reported. The final results were not significantly different. All other municipal results are taken from official summaries made available by the City of Toronto.

=== Provincial and federal politics ===
Ontario provincial by-election, May 23, 1996: York South
Party	Candidate	Votes	%
Liberal	Gerard Kennedy	7,774	39.22
New Democratic	David Miller	6,656	33.58
Progressive Conservative	Rob Davis	5,093	25.69
Independent	David Milne	151	0.76
Libertarian	George Dance	77	0.39
Independent	Kevin Clarke	70	0.35
Total valid votes		19,821	100.00
Rejected, unmarked and declined ballots		264	
Turnout		20,085	51.38
Electors on the lists		39,092	
Source: Elections Ontario

1993 Canadian federal election: Parkdale—High Park
Party	Candidate	Votes	%	Expenditures
Liberal	Jesse Flis	22,358	54.36	$42,653
Reform	Lee Primeau	6,647	16.16	$22,990
Progressive Conservative	Don Baker	5,668	13.78	$34,329
New Democratic Party	David Miller	3,855	9.37	$24,305
National	Stephen A. Biega	1,320	3.21	$8,439
Green	Richard Roy	430	1.05	$100
Natural Law	Wanda Beaver	371	0.90	$0
Libertarian	Haig Baronikian	264	0.64	$0
Ind. (Communist)	Miguel Figueroa	105	0.26	$1,043
Abolitionist	Thomas Earl Pennington	60	0.15	$0
Marxist-Leninist	André Vachon	53	0.13	$150
Total valid votes		41,131	100.00	
Rejected, unmarked and declined ballots		416		
Turnout		41,547	66.37	
Electors on the lists		62,600		
Source: Thirty-fifth General Election, 1993: Official Voting Results, Published by the Chief Electoral Officer of Canada. Financial figures taken from official contributions and expenses provided by Elections Canada.

The provincial electoral data is taken from Elections Ontario, and the federal data from Elections Canada.

== See also ==
- 2010 G-20 Toronto summit protests

== Notes ==
Political offices
Preceded by Mel Lastman	Mayor of Toronto; 2003 - 2010	Succeeded by Rob Ford
Preceded by ward established in 2000	Toronto City Councillor, Ward Thirteen (Parkdale-High Park); 2000-2003	Succeeded by Bill Saundercook
Preceded by ward established in 1997	Toronto City Councillor, Ward Nineteen (with Chris Korwin-Kuczynski); 1997-2000	Succeeded by all Toronto wards were restructured in 2000
Preceded by Derwyn Shea	Metro Toronto Councillor, Ward One; 1994-1997	Succeeded by ward eliminated in 1997
