= Britannia Landfill =

Coordinates: 43.5991°N 79.6966°W

Britannia landfill, now BraeBen Golf Course, and previously Britannia Hills Golf Course, was a garbage dump located in the city of Mississauga and later transformed into a golf course. The site is located on Terry Fox Way south of Britannia Road West.

Opened in 1980 by Peel Region, the 200-acre (0.81 km^{2}) site took garbage from Peel and Metro Toronto. It closed in 2002 and was used to create a 27-hole golf course.

The City of Mississauga has a 99-year lease on the facility. Gases from the dump are to be used to generate electricity.

Other Greater Toronto Area landfills include:

- Beare Road Landfill in Toronto, Ontario;
- Keele Valley Landfill in Vaughan, Ontario;
- Brock Road Landfills in Pickering, Ontario.
