= Toronto Works and Emergency Services =

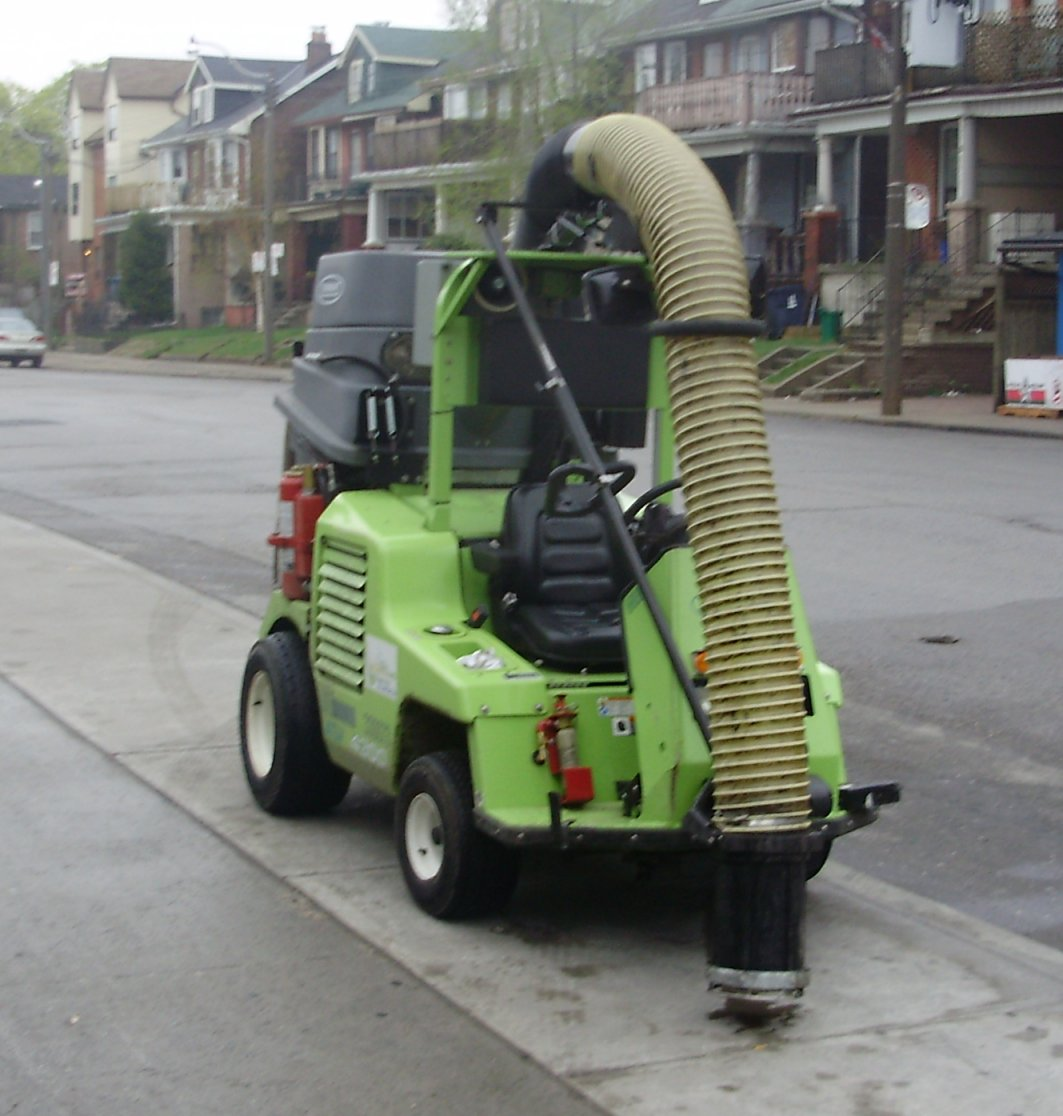
Toronto Works and Emergency Services street sweeper.

Toronto Works and Emergency Services was a former City of Toronto department that was responsible for a variety of services including water and sewage, solid waste management, and snow removal.

== History ==
The department took over public works departments from the former cities of Metro Toronto, as well as waste management portion of Metro Toronto Works.

In 2002, the city launched a review of water and waste water matters, which recommended the creation of a municipal service board. However, this was strongly opposed by the public and it was recommended instead that the Water and Wastewater Services Division become a unit within the department of Works and Emergency Services.

== Organization ==
The department was organised into two divisions:

- Toronto Technical Services Division, which was concerned with environmental, emergency and engineering matters; and
- Toronto Support Services Division, which was responsible for planning, financing and administration.

Initially, the division reported to a deputy city manager but, with the appointment of a new executive committee, the division came to report to chair of the Public Works and Infrastructure Committee.

== Activities ==
The department had responsibilities for a number of services, including:

- water and sewage
- solid waste management; and
- snow removal.

=== Water and sewage ===
Toronto (1998–present) maintained a network of water filtration plants, pumping stations and reservoirs providing water to the city. Some facilities were located outside the city, with two reservoirs and one water tank located in York Region. Sewage treatment facilities were located along Lake Ontario to treat water from households and industry and commercial consumers before there were released into the lake, while sludge was sent to dumps and other facilities in the province.

The department also spearheaded public works projects to, amongst other things, repairs sewers, manage water networks, and maintain city facilities. For example, in 1999, Toronto piloted front-loading washing machines in public housing to assess water and energy savings. Toronto's Works and Emergency Services Department partnered with industry (including Maytag Appliances, Enbridge Consumers Gas, Procter & Gamble and Harco Company) and the Toronto Housing Company.

In 1998, Toronto Water took over as the body responsible for water and sewage treatment in the city.

=== Solid Waste Management ===
The department was responsible for the city's solid waste management, including green bin and grey box garbage collection and blue box recycling.

The city once owned landfills in the Greater Toronto Area but later solid waste was shipped to a city-owned landfill near St. Thomas, Ontario and another facility in Michigan. However, services for the administrative district of Etobicoke were contracted out to a private firm under a contract entered into by the former city of Etobicoke.

The department offered public tours of its waste facilities for people interested in learning more about recycling and garbage treatment and disposal.

Waste collection, landfills, and waste transfer stations are now managed by Toronto Solid Waste Management.

=== Snow Removal ===
The department was also responsible for salting and plowing city roads in winter, with 600 snowplows and 300 sidewalk snow removal equipment run by 1300 personnel.

=== Other ===
In 2001, the department participated in "Turn It Off" a multi-sector partnership to reduce greenhouse gas emissions.

== Fleet ==
The department had a fleet of vehicles, including:

- Sterling Trucks Accetra heavy duty trucks
- Peterbilt 357 dump trucks
- Mack Trucks/Ford road sweepers
- Heil Environmental Industries Limited Formula 7000 Square Body side loader garbage trucks
- Allianz Series 3000 street sweepers
- Ride on street vacuums
- Crane Carrier Corporation side loaders, which were part of the City of North York's fleet prior to merger of the waste departments in 1998
- Ford F-series pickup trucks.
