= Beare Hill Park =

Park in Scarborough, Ontario, Canada

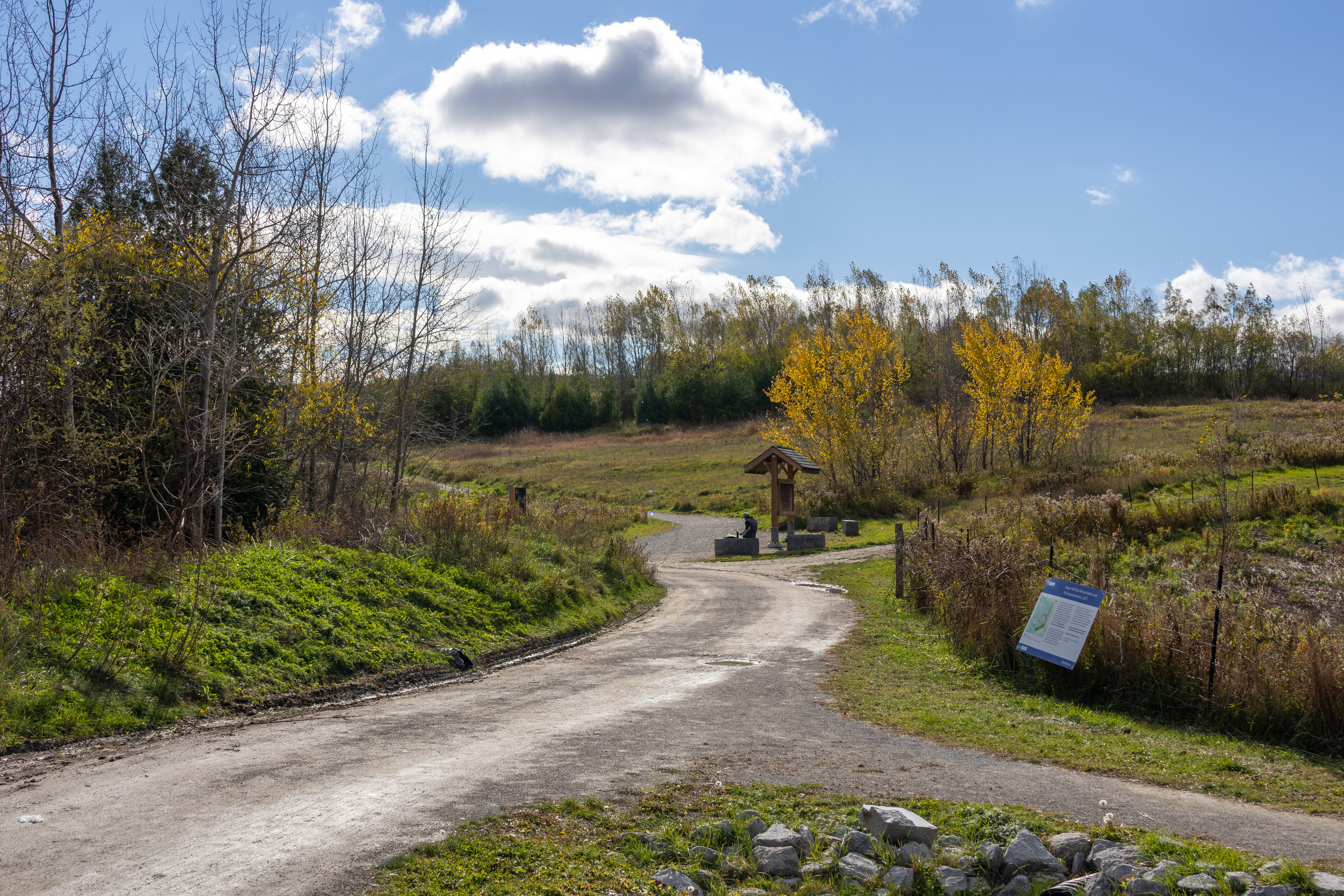
- Entrance from Finch Avenue in 2025

- Location within Toronto
- Type: Urban park
- Location: 8145 Finch Ave E, Toronto, Ontario, Canada
- Coordinates: 43°49′30″N 79°09′43″W
- Owner: City of Toronto
- Operator: Toronto Parks, Forestry & Recreation
- Website: www.toronto.ca/explore-enjoy/parks-recreation/places-spaces/parks-and-recreation-facilities/location/?id=3777

Beare Hill Park is a park in Scarborough, Ontario, Canada. The site is bounded by Finch Avenue East to the north, the Scarborough-Pickering Town Line to the east, CN Rail line to the west and hydro corridor to the south. It was previously operating as Beare Road landfill, until 1983.

Metropolitan Toronto opened the site in 1967 with the approval of Scarborough Council. The 80.5-hectare site, originally with a capacity of 3.3 million tonnes, received solid waste through 1988. Metro and Scarborough agreed to expand the landfill's capacity by 635,000 tonnes in 1971 and 5.4 million tonnes in 1974.

Following closure of the landfill in 1983, the City continued to manage the site to control potential impacts. To limit emissions and control odours, the surface of the site was equipped with an array of passive candlestick gas flares. The City developed a landfill gas to electricity project at the Beare Road site. Construction of the LFG collection field and power plant proceeded and generation of electricity from LFG began in January 1996.

== Attempts at a ski resort ==
Scarborough's desire was first expressed in 1971, to improve the site for recreational purposes. Metro would design the facility and manage disbursements from the trust account; Scarborough would lease the property as of 1978, undertake construction, and assume any excess costs.

In 1982, Scarborough cancelled this agreement. Metro undertook preliminary work on the ski facility into the early 1990s before abandoning the project. As plans emerged for the Rouge Park, Metro officials acknowledged that a ski facility at Beare Road would likely be rejected by the Province, given the project's incompatibility with other land uses in and around the park and the range of possible environmental impacts.

== Rouge Park ==
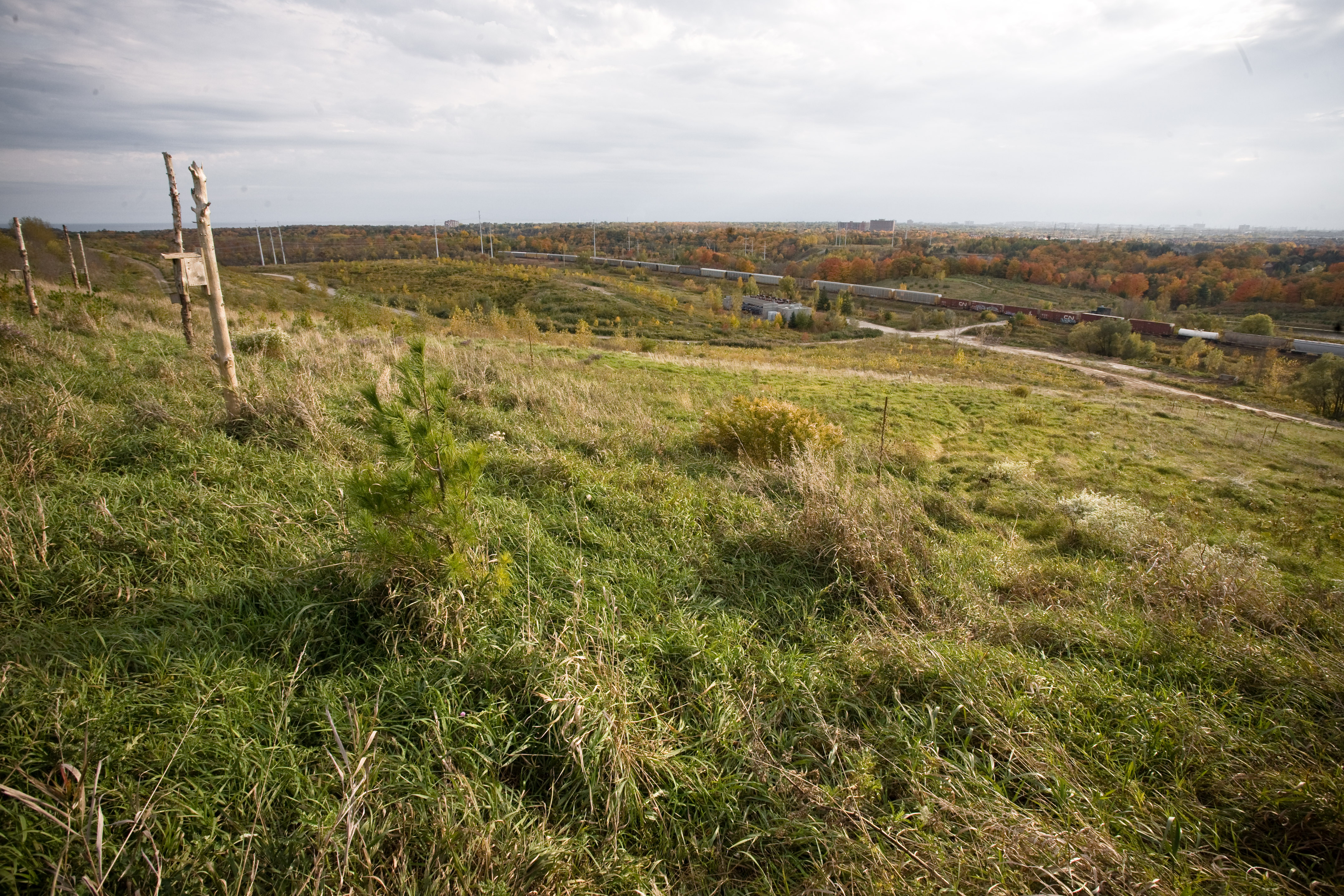
View of Beare Road Landfill looking west over Scarborough in 2010

Today the former landfill is adjacent to Rouge National Urban Park and the Rouge Valley Conservation Centre, which is operated by a non-profit organization, the Rouge Valley Foundation. The Rouge Valley Conservation Centre is located at the foot of Zoo Road. The former landfill site, now vegetated with wooded and grassland areas, is accessible by Zoo Road past the CN rail crossing. Before the park opened, hikers could not access the landfill, as it was under redevelopment as a natural area parkland. However, hikers could access the landfill through one of several holes in the fence surrounding the landfill, but it was ill-advised. The City of Toronto officially opened the site as a park, Beare Hill Park, in October 2022.

== See also ==
- Keele Valley Landfill in Vaughan, Ontario
- Metro Toronto Works - operator of landfill until 1983 and maintain site until 1997
- Green Lane landfill - replaced Adams Mine and Keele Valley as landfill site for the City of Toronto
- Brock Road Landfills - located in Pickering and Ajax; Brock West closed in 1990s and Brock North in 1996
- Carleton Farms Landfill - located in Michigan and took Toronto's garbage from 2002 to 2006
