= Green Lane Landfill =

Coordinates: 42.8136°N 81.32637°W

The Green Lane landfill is a landfill in Southwold, Ontario, Canada, southwest of London. It is owned and operated by the City of Toronto as Toronto’s main landfill, located 200 kilometres (120 mi) west of the city.

It operates a leachate collection system and an on-site leachate treatment plant. Green Lane also has an extensive landfill gas collection system. This gas is roughly 50 percent methane and 50 percent carbon dioxide, along with traces of other gases. The gas is collected and directed to the flaring system that allows for release into the air.

== History and politics ==
As Toronto’s last remaining landfill site, Keele Valley, neared capacity during the 1990s, it was found that no other municipality in Southern Ontario was willing to accept the garbage, but there was also no political support for a change to incineration. A deal was eventually made to ship Toronto's garbage to the Adams Mine, an abandoned open pit mine in Northern Ontario, once the Keele Valley site closed. But controversy grew into vehement objection as the time neared, and eventually the agreement was canceled.

By the time the Keele Valley site closed at the end of 2002, the city had made a new deal, to ship its garbage by truck to Carleton Farms Landfill in Sumpter Township, Michigan, United States. Issues at the Canada–United States border and opposition from residents in Michigan prompted the need to look for alternate sites or expand the city's recycling programs. The Michigan contract survived a vote in February 2006 by the Michigan House of Representatives to ban out-of-state garbage from being shipped to the state from Ontario and other U.S. states, as it also required approval by the US federal government before it could be enforced by Michigan. In May 2006, the Michigan Carleton Farms garbage dump under contract with the city of Toronto announced it would not be accepting waste sludge as of August 1, 2006, but would continue to receive household waste.

In September 2006, Toronto City Council agreed to purchase the privately owned Green Lane landfill site. Councillors opposed to the agreement accused Toronto Mayor David Miller of pushing through a secretive deal, and there was also a strong reaction from residents and members of parliament from the London metropolitan area. Jane Pitfield, who ran (and lost) against Miller in the November 2006 municipal election, advocated incineration as an alternative method of disposing of waste. Many Toronto environmental groups opposed it, but supporters argued that the technology has improved and incineration is now less polluting.

Even with 60% diversion through the green bin and recycling programs, residual waste from the Greater Toronto Area would amass 2,200 tonnes (2,425 tons) a day or 800,000 tonnes (882,000 tons) a year.

In April 2007, the city signed contracts with First Nations bands whose reserves were close to the proposed landfill, which would entitle the bands to $4.27 per tonne of garbage deposited at the landfill, or approximately $500,000 per year.

The contract to ship household garbage to Michigan ended in 2010, at which point use of the Green Lane landfill began.

== See also ==
- Beare Road landfill
- Brock Road landfills
- Carleton Farms landfill
- Keele Valley landfill
