= Toronto Engineering and Construction Services Division =

Division overview
- Headquarters: Metro Hall
- Division executive: Jennifer Graham Harkness, Executive Director and Chief Engineer
- Parent organization: City of Toronto
- Website: Division webpage

Toronto Engineering and Construction Services (ECS; formerly known as Technical Services) is a division of the City of Toronto which provides engineering design, project management, construction management and stakeholder engagement for municipal public works projects.

== Overview ==
The division specialized engineering and construction services to the City of Toronto's internal client divisions such as Toronto Water, Transportation Services and Solid Waste Management Services. Furthermore, ECS also provides services to external clients such as the development industry, utility companies, and other public agencies.

The division is divided into three primary business units

- Design & Construction - further divided into three operational sections:
  - Major Infrastructure
  - Linear Underground Infrastructure
  - Vertical Above-ground Infrastructure (including pumping stations, Wastewater, Filtration Plant buildings, etc.)
  - Transportation Infrastructure
- Engineering Review
- Engineering Support Services
