= Brock Road landfills =

Landfills in Toronto

Brock Road landfills are a series of landfills used by Toronto (acquired by Metro Toronto in 1969) from 1975 to 1990s. The North and West site are in Pickering, while the South site is in Ajax.

Only Brock North and Brock West were used as dumps, whereas Brock South site was acquired and left unused.

Several factors led to the closure of the landfill sites, including: sites reaching capacity; public pressure to discontinue using these sites for Toronto's garbage; and the proximity of these sites to nearby farms, residential areas, and to sensitive or protected areas such as Grand Valley Park, Greenwood Conservation Area, and First Nations sites discovered in the Duffins Creek watershed to the west and east.

== Brock West ==
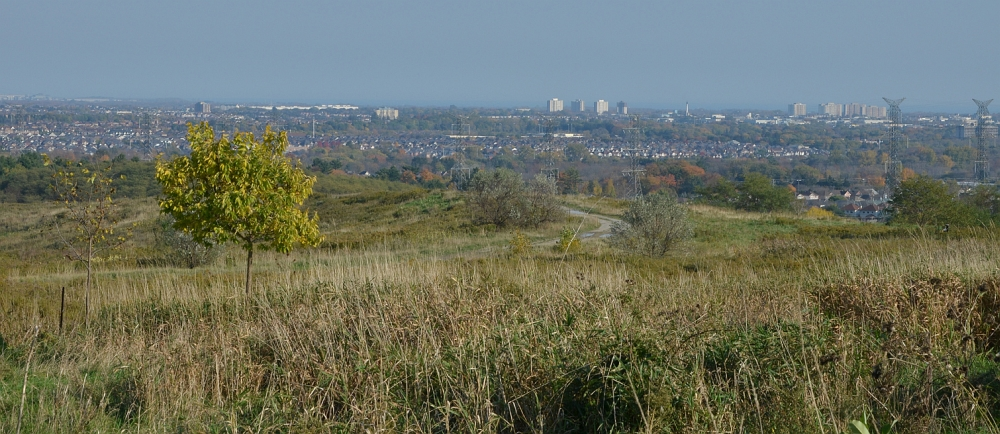
A view south-east from the top of Brock West landfill

The Brock West site was an active landfill from 1975 to 1997. It could hold 18 million tonnes of waste, including 100,000 tonnes which were transferred from Brock North. The site closed after 1997, and a plant to capture gas from the garbage was installed in 1991.

The site is located west of Decker's Hill, and the main gate is on Concession Road 3, west of Brock Road, at 43.868496°N 79.100544°W. Next to the gate is an access point to the Seaton Hiking Trail, as well as public parking.

== Brock North ==
Brock North landfill was located between Highway 7 and 5th Concession and east of 16th Sideline. (43.906087°N 79.086437°W) It was acquired along with Brock West and South in 1969 by Toronto, but it was not an active dump until the 1970s and was used briefly. The site was 732 acres (296 ha) in area and closed in 1996 and 100,000 tonnes waste from the site was removed relocated to Brock West.,

The site is now abandoned with locked gates and partial concrete driveway on 5th Concession a reminder of the location's previous use. With Brock South the land will be sold by Toronto to the TRCA.

== Brock South ==
Brock South is the smallest of the three sites at 237 acres (96 ha) and located directly south of Brock North site between 16th Sideline and Church Street North.(43.9029°N 79.0844°W) It was never used as a landfill and remains private property. The eastern end of the site borders Greenwood Conservation Area.

== Remediation of Brock North and South sites ==
The Brock North and South sites are being sold/transferred to the Toronto and Area Conservation Authority and reverted to natural state. As both sites no longer contain garbage, they are excellent candidates for remediation. The conversion to conservation lands was agreed upon during the original sale in the late 1960s. The site will likely increase the size of neighbouring Greenwood Conservation Area (owned by the Town of Ajax, Ontario).

== See also ==
- Keele Valley Landfill in Vaughan, Ontario
- Green Lane landfill located near London, Ontario
- Beare Road Landfill located in northeast Toronto
- Carleton Farms Landfill located in Michigan and took Toronto's garbage
