= Keele Valley landfill =

Closed landfill in Vaughan, Ontario, Canada

Coordinates: 43.8691°N 79.4978°W

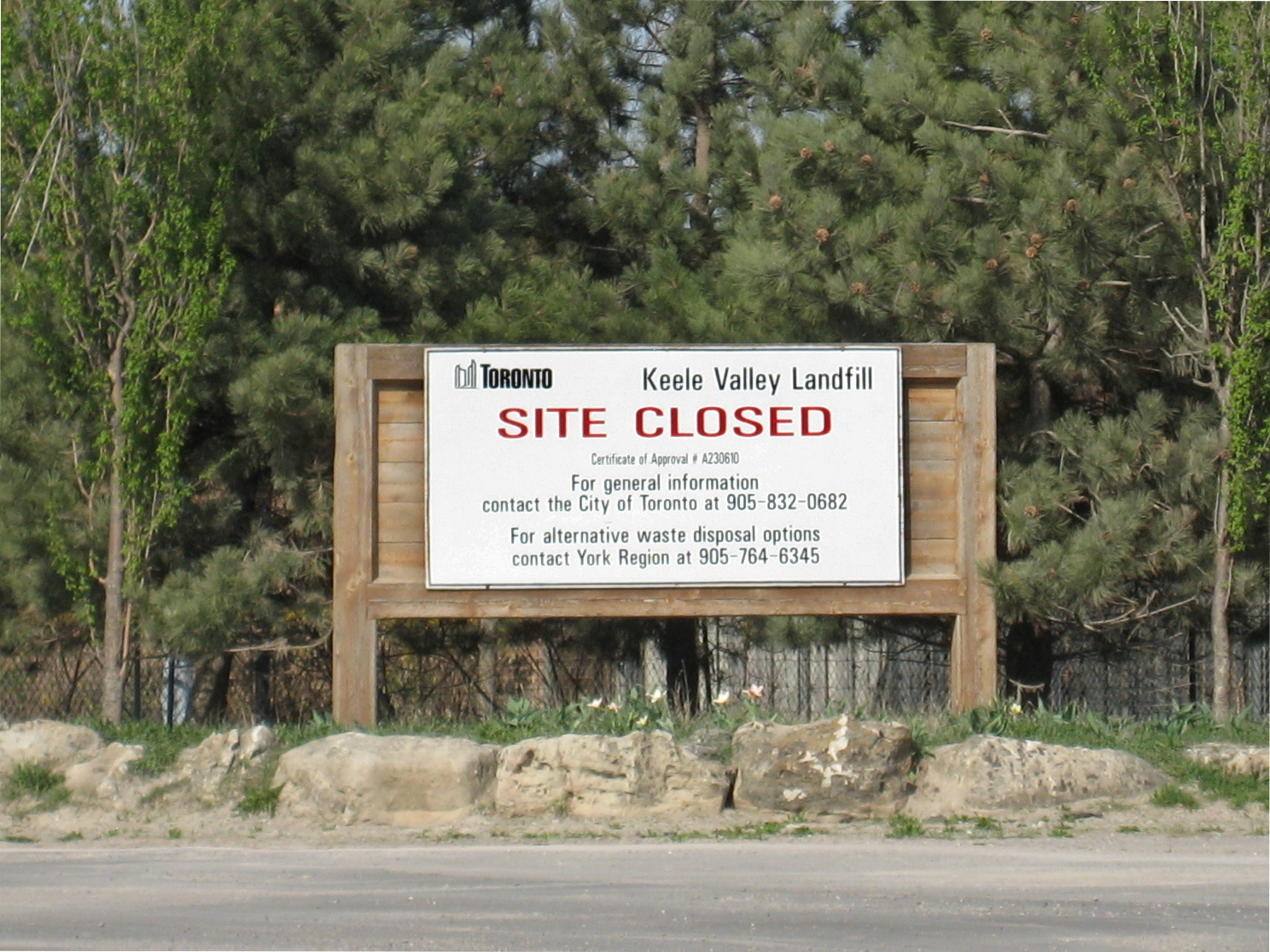
A sign notifying visitors that the site is closed

The Keele Valley landfill was the largest landfill in Canada and the third largest in North America during its operation. It was the primary landfill site for the City of Toronto and the regional municipalities of York and Durham from 1983 until 2002, and was owned and operated by the City of Toronto. It was located at the intersection of Keele Street and McNaughton Road in Maple, a community in the northeastern part of the City of Vaughan in Ontario.

In 1985, the initial portion of a landfill gas collection system was installed to reduce emissions and associated odours emanating into the nearby community. This has been used to generate electricity, which it has continued to do since the landfill's closing, sufficient to power 20,000 homes.

The facility is registered in the National Pollutant Release Inventory, with site identification number 7371. The site emitted about 410 kilotonnes of carbon dioxide equivalent greenhouse gases in 2011.

In 2002, the site was identified by the Government of Ontario as an Area of High Aquifer Vulnerability, which would prohibit waste disposal and organic soil conditioning facilities being built or operating there per the Oak Ridges Moraine Conservation Plan. Vaughan's Official Plan Amendment 604 (OPA 604) specified that the site would be redeveloped as an open public space.

== Operation ==
The site was originally a large gravel pit which was purchased by the city of Toronto in the 1970s for CA$38 million. Before its opening, Toronto's trash was sent to the Beare Road Landfill in Scarborough, and Vaughan's trash was sent to a site about 1 kilometre north of Keele Valley, north of Teston Road. When it opened, the Keele Valley Landfill was within an almost entirely rural setting, but the rapid growth of Maple in the 1990s surrounded the site with residential developments. The site opened on 28 November 1983 based on an agreement between Metropolitan Toronto and York Region, under which Toronto was required to dispose of York's waste until 2003 in exchange for establishing the Keele Valley site. The site accepted garbage from the area of Toronto west of Yonge Street, whereas garbage from areas east of Yonge Street was sent to the Brock Road Landfills. The York municipalities of King and Georgina continued to dispose of their waste in local landfill for some time, whereas the others paid dumping fees to the city of Toronto for use of the Keele Valley Landfill. The site was originally scheduled to close in 1993, at which time it was expected to reach its capacity of 20 million tonnes. It overlays a sand aquifer, using a single engineered landfill liner to prevent leachate from entering the aquifer below.

An on-site Household Hazardous Waste depot collected paint, batteries, pesticides, cleaning agents and other hazardous waste in small (residential) quantities. A general recycling depot, to which residents and businesses could bring appliances (refrigerators, stoves, washing machines, etc.), corrugated cardboard, drywall, scrap metal and tires for recycling operated at the site, as did a tire recycling depot. The facility also had a yard waste drop-off area, from which the operators would transport material for composting in large outdoor windrows on a site north of the landfill, at the Avondale Composting Site. It also accepted waste brought by residents of households in York Region, but building contractors abused the privilege by bringing numerous small loads to the landfill, prompting the imposition of a tipping fee in 1990 for pickup trucks and small trailers. Commercial haulers were charged $18 per tonne in 1988, and $97 per tonne in 1990.

The site was a profitable venture for the city of Toronto. In its last year of operation in 2002, it generated $25 million of revenue. It processed 1.57 million tonnes of waste in 1986, and 2.2 million tonnes in 1988, most of which increase was by the private sector. By 2000, it was processing 1.4 million tonnes of garbage from the city of Toronto.

=== Waste collected ===
The site collected approximately 28 million tonnes of waste throughout its operational lifetime. In 1999 biomedical waste constituted 4,300 tonnes and asbestos constituted 4,900 tonnes of the waste collected that year. The fee for disposing such waste was $50 per tonne before 3 January 2000, and $75 thereafter until the site closing. The cost of clean fill also increased to $20 per tonne on that date.

Hazardous materials, including biomedical waste and asbestos, were treated before final disposal.

The table below shows the concentration of various leachate chemicals at the Keele Valley Landfill based on the October 2000 report Final Report East Taro Landfill. It compares the Keele Valley peak annual average data to the Ontario provincial standards for municipal solid waste (MSW) and Drinking Water Objectives (DWO). Also included are results from a 2002 paper about Keele Valley leachate analysis by Fleming and D. Rowe, and a 1995 paper by R.K. Rowe.

Chemical	Concentration				
Chemical	DWO standard	MSW standard	Keele Valley		
Chemical	DWO standard	MSW standard	MOE study	Fleming & Rowe	Rowe
Chemical oxygen demand (COD, mg/L as O)	n/a			6,100–25,000	1,410–27,600
Biochemical oxygen demand (mg/L as O)	n/a			3,400–16,400	2,330–16,000
Total organic carbon (mg/L as C)				1,440–7,060	
Electrical conductivity (mS/cm)				10–23	
Total suspended solids (mg/L)				40–370	
Volatile suspended solids (%)				29–65	
Benzene (μg/L)	5	20	<20		<0.1–25
Cadmium (mg/L)	0.005	0.05	0.024		0.0002–0.34
Chloride (mg/L)	250	1,500–2,500	2,979	1,400–3,800	173–3,810
Lead (mg/L)	0.01	0.6	0.1		0.001–33
1,2-Dichloroethane (μg/L)	5				nd – <86
1,4-Dichlorobenzene (μg/L)	1	10	10		nd – <86
1,1-Dichloroethylene (μg/L)	14				nd – 60
1,2-Dichloroethylene (μg/L)	n/a				nd – 900
Dichloromethane (μg/L)	50	3,300	3,372		215–7,100
Ethylbenzene (μg/L)	2.4				30–1,400
Toluene (μg/L)	24	1,000	950		485–1,821
Tetrachloroethylene (μg/L)	30				nd – <86
Trichloroethylene (μg/L)	50	50			nd – <230
Vinyl chloride (μg/L)	2	55	55		nd – 70
o-Xylene (μg/L)					30–1,450
m- and p-Xylene (μg/L)	300				70–3,900
Sodium (mg/L)	200			824–2,220	
Potassium (mg/L)				420–1,040	
pH	6.5–8.5		5.8–7.4	5.9–6.8	5.7–6.8
Ammonia (mg/L)				220–770	
Phenols (mg/L)					
Calcium (mg/L)			1,539	660–2,880	62–2,860
Total Kjeldahl Nitrogen (mg/L as N)				370–1340	
Nitrate (mg/L)	10.0			0.02–16.00	
Sulphate (mg/L)	500			34–290	
Sulphide (mg/L)	0.05			0.2–10.0	
Alkalinity (mg/L CaCO3)	30–500			3,200–8,100	
Iron (mg/L)	0.3			46–357	0.5–1,910
Magnesium (mg/L)				306–695	
Manganese (mg/L)	0.05			1.7–20.0	
Mercury (mg/L)	0.001				0.00003–0.0025
Phosphorus (mg/L)				2.5–8.7	
Zinc (mg/L)	5.0				0.072–5.6
Total phenolics (4AAP) (mg/L)				0.2–4.5	
Volatile organic acids (mg/L)				2,260–7,420	
Microbial ATP (ng/L)				20 (avg.)	
Total heterotrophs (no./mL)				2–40×10^{8}	

=== Landfill gas collection ===
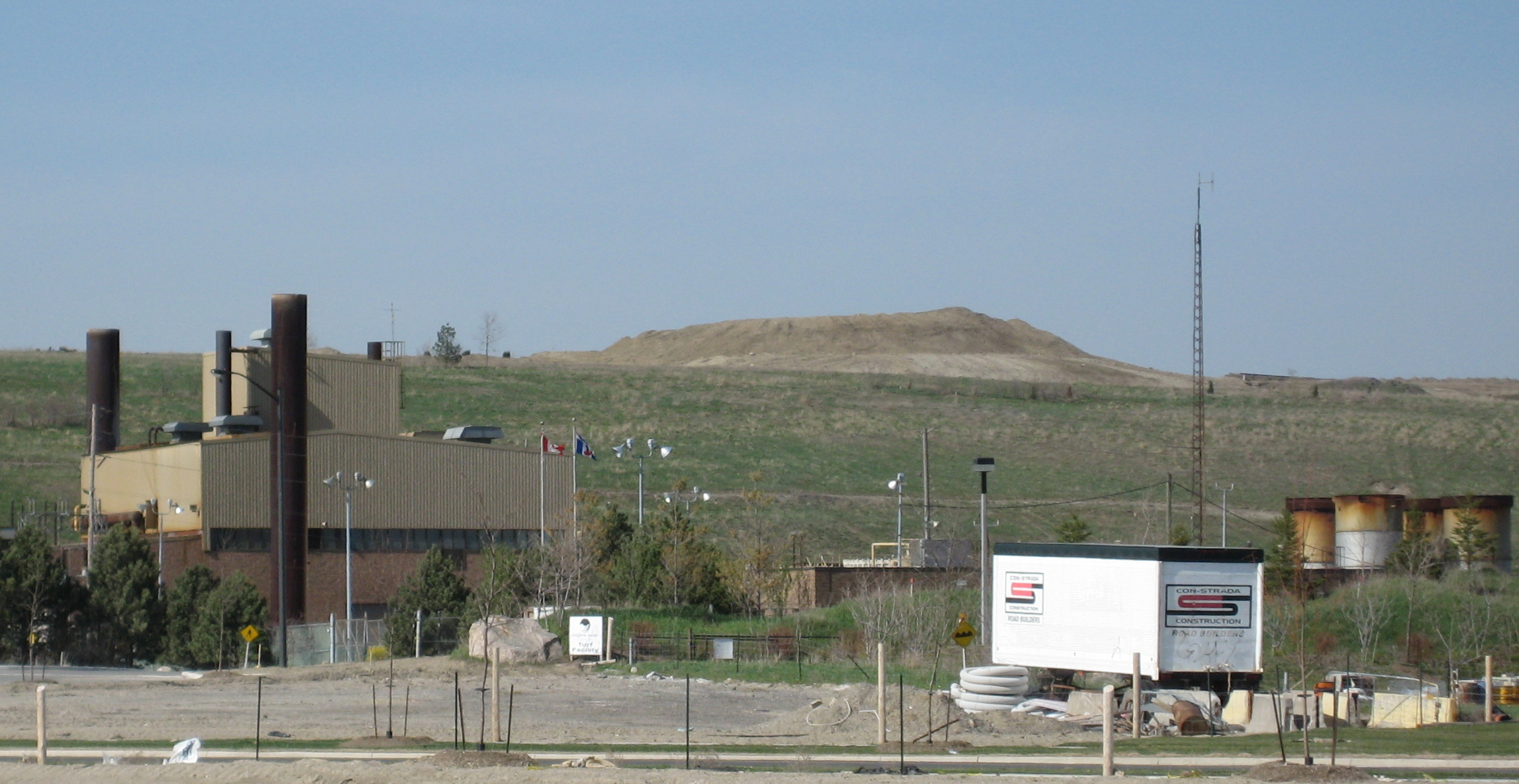
The Keele Valley Landfill main station is visible with the nearby power plant

From 1985, a system to collect and flare gas was installed by its operators to mitigate the potential effects of landfill gas, including methane, which constitutes 47% of landfill gases at this site. This system was installed in progressive stages until 2002 as the waste accumulated in the landfill. In 1993, Eastern Power Developers won a bid to develop an electricity generation station at the landfill, which it built in 1994 at a cost of $30 million. By April 1995, it was in operation, selling electricity to Ontario Hydro's electricity distribution department (now Hydro One and the Independent Electricity System Operator).

The landfill gas was collected from the site and diverted to a central blower and flare station via gas transmission pipes. Most of this gas is then directed to the electricity generating station, which has a peak generation capacity of about 33,000 kilowatts. It generates 274,800,000 kilowatt hour of power annually, delivering 31,370 of continuous power. Five percent of the collected gas is combusted and flared.

It is a combined cycle plant consisting of two 1 MW gas turbines, two boilers which operate on landfill gas and recovered waste heat, and one 30 MW steam turbine. The pipe system extracts 17,005 standard cubic feet per minute (119 million cubic metres annually) of landfill gases from the collection field, which consists of "over 40,000 linear metres of horizontal gas collection trenches and 80 vertical gas collection wells installed within the landfilled waste". Circling the site is a 10,000 linear metre dual header piping system which is used for the transmission of gas from the wells and trenches to the flaring station.

The power plant emits nitric oxide for which it has an emission allowance from the Ontario Emissions Trading Registry. Nitric oxide is an air pollutant which has a participatory role in ozone layer depletion and which may form nitric acid in the atmosphere, resulting in acid rain.

Year	Emission allowance	
Year	NO	SO_{2}
2003	0	0
2004	0	0
2005	0	0
2006	205	0
2007	168	0
2008	146	0
2009	92	0
2010	86	0
2011	0	0
Total	697	0

The city of Toronto receives approximately $1 million in royalty payments annually for recovering the landfill gases which are used at the power plant.

=== Expansion and lawsuit ===
In 1993, Superior-Crawford Sand & Gravel Ltd., which owned most of the adjacent land, promoted the site's expansion, which it had also suggested in 1991. The company conducted feasibility studies for expansion, and actively campaigned for it, claiming that with expansion an additional 52 million tonnes of waste could be accepted at the site for 20 years, starting in 1996. The report, based on research conducted by consultants hired by the company, claimed that Keele Valley was the most suitable site for consideration based on criteria defined by the Interim Waste Authority (IWA). The company's proposal was to expand the landfill site to include 190 hectares of land owned by Superior-Crawford and 60 hectares of other nearby land, most of which was owned by Metropolitan Toronto.

On 20 May 1993, Michael Jeffery, a lawyer for the company, stated that the company would file a lawsuit to challenge the IWA site selection process if Keele Valley expansion was excluded from consideration. By the following week, Superior-Crawford had filed a legal suit contesting the choices of the IWA report for future landfill sites to host the region's garbage, favouring expansion of Keele Valley. It had complained about its exclusion from the original IWA list of 57 potential sites in 1992. The company also mailed pamphlets to 7,000 residents in communities near sites on the IWA short list as part of its campaign. Although expansion of the Keele Valley landfill was not originally a viable option, the legal actions by Superior-Crawford "could very easily change the context", according to Walter Pitman of the IWA. The other viable candidate for a landfill site was the North Vaughan site, adjacent to King City at the northern boundary of Vaughan near Jane Street, which was deemed by Superior-Crawford to be "extremely disruptive" to King City and neighbouring Vaughan residents.

Local residents strongly disliked the dump due to the odours and constant truck traffic it generated, and were opposed to its expansion. As early as 1990, organisations were active in opposing the expansion of the landfill, most prominently Vaughan CARES. Primary objections to the expansion were the existence of new houses built less than one kilometre from the site, the construction of St. Joan of Arc Catholic High School at the nearby intersection of McNaughton Road and Saint Joan of Arc Avenue, and the planned development of a residential community for 30,000 people in adjacent parts of Richmond Hill. The IWA cited a number of concerns regarding expansion of the facility, including the existence of the Maple Nursing Home on Keele Street, which would result in an "insufficient buffer between the home and new landfill, according to IWA standards". By August 1993, the IWA stated that it would consider the merits of expanding Keele Valley if "technical concerns of the IWA can be satisfactorily addressed by Superior-Crawford", eliciting strong objections from Vaughan mayor Lorna Jackson and Vaughan CARES. In 1994, Jackson urged Vaughan council for a broad study to assess the impact of airborne contaminants on nearby residents, and Vaughan CARES requested a clinical study from council. In 1988, Jackson had proposed renaming the landfill the Don Valley Dump, a reference to the Don River and valley in Toronto with headwaters originating near Keele Valley, so that residents of Toronto would "understand how expansion of the refuse heap will affect them".

In 1990, a contingency plan proposed by York Region was accepted by the Solid Waste Interim Steering Committee (a group represented by the regional chairmen of Metro Toronto, Peel, Halton, York and Durham), for regional waste disposal from 1993 to 1996. It permitted the continued operation of Keele Valley during this time, expanding its capacity by 5 million tonnes. In 1993, Mario Ferri had noted that the landfill sits upon the Oak Ridges Moraine, which would, according to the Ministry of Natural Resources, preclude the site's further expansion.

For the Ontario general election of 1990, the site was used as a campaign stop by Bob Rae and the NDP candidate for York Centre, during which they promised that if elected, the site would not be expanded without a complete environmental assessment. In 1996, Metropolitan Toronto council indicated that the site would have to be expanded if "stringent environmental legislation" was enacted by the province.

The city of Toronto and a Zoning Board of Appeal (ZBA) "to permit the continued accessory waste management uses in the Primary Buffer Area at the [376 ha] Keele Valley Landfill Site and yard waste composting at the [66 ha] Avondale Clay Extraction site". It also applied for an amendment to the Environmental Protection Act for a certificate of approval for the yard waste composting facility. The bylaw in effect was to expire on 31 May 1999 per an Ontario Municipal Board order. The application would allow landfill operation from 1 June 1999 to 31 May 2002, and operation of the composting facility until late 2003.

== Issues ==
In 1987, owing to media reports that Vaughan council had "learned second-hand about "possibly unacceptable waste" being dumped at the site" a provincial-municipal liaison committee was established to investigate and report on the material being dumped at the landfill.

In 1989, the city of Toronto wanted to expropriate 46 hectares of land near the landfill in order to mine it for clay, which it would use to line the landfill. Multiple lawsuits were filed against the city: from 1,500 residents of Maple; from the town of Vaughan; and from Liford Holdings Ltd., owners of the property.

In 1994, York Region filed a $132 million lawsuit against the city of Toronto because it charged higher tipping fees to trucks that had collected waste from York Region than it did to those that had collected waste from Toronto. The suit also requested that the court rescind York Region's permission to the city of Toronto to operate the Keele Valley Landfill.

=== Resident class action lawsuit ===
The gas collection system did not collect all the methane, some of which escaped the landfill site. The leachate "made the mounds collapse periodically, causing exhalations of methane, giving off its pungent rotten-egg, hydrogen sulfate stench." The odour would spread throughout the nearby residential areas, and led to a class-action lawsuit initiated by John Hollick, a Maple resident, on behalf of 30,000 residents of Maple against the city of Toronto in 1997. It was rejected by the Ontario Court of Appeal in December 1999, but was taken to the Supreme Court of Canada in 2001. The allegations in the lawsuit were that methane, hydrogen sulphide, and vinyl chloride gases were not sufficiently contained to the site, causing air pollution in the area, that truck traffic created noise pollution, and that seagull droppings were problematic. On 1 March 2001, Gord Miller, the Environmental Commissioner of Ontario, was granted intervenor status to the litigation, which would be presented to the Supreme Court on 18 June 2001. The commissioner's intervenor status in the case was to support the litigant's claim of the landfill being a public nuisance, per provisions in the Environmental Bill of Rights of Ontario.

"The Supreme Court's decision in this case gives my office our first opportunity to intervene as a friend of the court to promote and enhance the environmental rights set out in the Environmental Bill of Rights," said Commissioner Miller. "We want to assist the Court in their understanding of these EBR rights. We also want to make sure the interpretation of this legislation is consistent with the province's broader strategy of protecting, conserving and restoring the natural environment."

— Gord Miller, News Release, Office of the Environmental Commissioner of Ontario

The Commissioner would not take a specific position on the issue, but was concerned about the Ontario Court of Appeal's reasoning for the rejection of the litigation. The Ontario Court of Appeal had stated that a class action lawsuit could not proceed because "the residents' complaints were not similar enough and were spread over too many years to constitute a common cause" The Supreme Court date was moved to 13 June 2001, before which Miller stated "The framers of the Environmental Bill of Rights believed strongly in the public's right to sue for damages because of a public nuisance causing environmental harm." The Environmental Commissioner of Ontario made oral submissions to the Supreme Court "regarding the role of class actions in protecting environment, the legal threshold for bringing such class actions, and the appropriate test the Court should apply when considering Section 103 of the EBR in conjunction with the requirements of the Class Proceedings Act."

On 18 October 2001, the case was dismissed by the Supreme Court, and the appeal was closed on 26 November.

== Closing ==
The resident class-action lawsuit eventually prompted Vaughan City Council to favour closing the site, and shipping York Region's and Toronto's garbage elsewhere. In 2000, Jackson declared to Toronto City Council that Vaughan Council would not extend the landfill's closing date beyond 2002, and rejected a proposal to operate it at half capacity until 2006.

Some 28 million tonnes of garbage were placed in the 376 hectare dump during its operation. The 99 hectare portion of the site designated as landfill reached its volumetric capacity in 2002, and was closed on New Year's Eve that year. Thousands of residents and Vaughan councillor Mario Ferri gathered at the base of the heap of garbage that day to celebrate the landfill's closing with champagne, cake, and fireworks.

Toronto had no immediate replacement facility, as the proposed Adams Mine project in Kirkland Lake met strong local and environmental opposition. After the closure of the landfill Toronto transported its waste to the Carleton Farms Landfill in Michigan. The city had started shipping 250,000 tonnes of garbage to Michigan as early as 1998, delaying closure of Keele Valley from 1998 to 2002. From 1998 to 2002, between 60 and 70 transport trucks carrying 34 tonnes of waste each were sent daily to Michigan along Highway 401; after the closing of Keele Valley, 130 trucks were sent daily.

However, the Avondale Composting Site operated through most of 2003, accepting clean fill at $30 per load, for revenues of approximately $250,000 that year, also processing existing waste into compost.

At Keele Valley, the city incurred costs of $15–20 per tonne of garbage processed. Sending it to Michigan cost $52 a tonne, increasing the city's waste management costs; closing Keele Valley also reduced the city's revenues, as it would no longer collect tipping fees it had charged private waste disposal companies to dump at the landfill. The city anticipated increased yearly costs of $41.8 million in a December 2002 report, owing to an increase in garbage disposal costs of about 300%. Of that, $13.4 million was due to higher disposal costs in Michigan, $25.8 million in foregone revenue, and $2.6 million related to the closure of the leaf and yard waste composting site.

In 2006 the city purchased the Green Lane landfill near London, which will become the new destination for the city's waste.

In order to address issues related to the costs of sending garbage to landfill sites, the city began a pilot green bin program in Etobicoke in September 2002, expanding the program throughout the city by 2005. This reduced landfill waste material by 30%, and increased waste diversion to about 42%. The city also established a mandatory recycling bylaw; previously, participation was voluntary.

== Redevelopment ==
The site of the Keele Valley Landfill has been partially redeveloped. The garbage has been covered by a 1.2 metre thick layer of soil, but it will take many decades for trash to decompose. The actual site of the landfill is not suitable for redevelopment until 2028, but some of the land surrounding it has already been put to new use. Adjacent to the southeastern part of the site is a golf course built in 2006, the Eagle's Nest Golf Club. In 2005, soccer fields and baseball diamonds were built on the north end of the site. As of 2024, plans are underway for a proposed Teston Road connecting link on the northern border of the closed landfill.

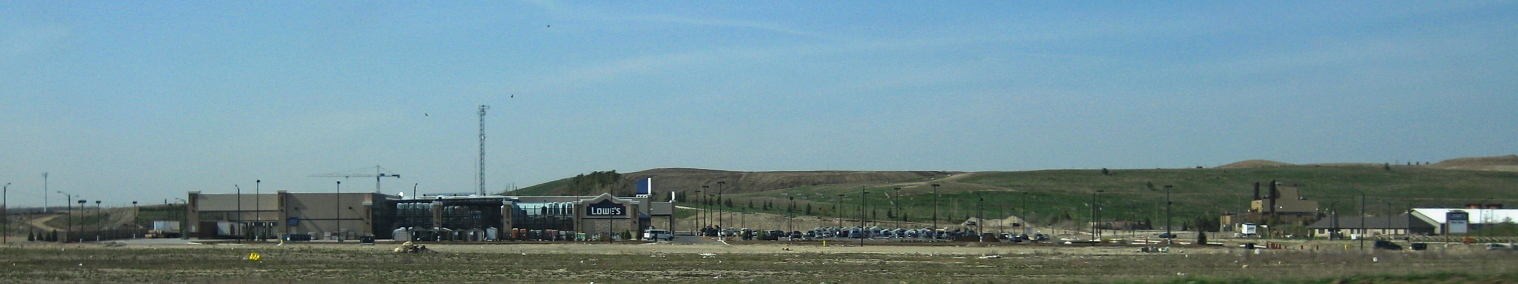
The Keele Valley Landfill which was closed in 2002, now overlooks nearby development

A RONA+ (formerly Lowe's) home improvement warehouse is located near the entrance to the former dump on McNaughton Road.
