= Adams Mine =

Iron mine in Ontario, Canada

Coordinates: 48.067°N 79.916°W

- Location within Ontario
- Location: Ontario, Canada
- Products: Iron Ore
- Opened: 1963
- Closed: 1990

Adams Mine is an abandoned open pit iron ore mine located in the Boston Township of the District of Timiskaming, 11 km (6.8 mi) south of Kirkland Lake in the Canadian province of Ontario. It is situated on the Canadian Shield.

== History ==
The iron ore deposit was originally discovered in 1906, however there was little interest in iron ore as a result of the discovery of gold in the Porcupine and Kirkland Lake regions. The site saw renewed interest in the second half of the 1950s and was subsequently developed by the Jones and Laughlin Steel Corp of Pittsburgh Pennsylvania with first production in 1964. The Jones and Laughlin company operated the mine until 1971 when it was sold to Dofasco Steel of Hamilton Ontario. The mine was operated in tandem with the Dofasco owned Sherman Mine. The mine closed in 1990 when the economically retrievable ore reserves were exhausted. The closure also made the Sherman Mine uneconomic and it was also closed. The closure of the two mines in the Timiskaming District along with the resultant job losses left the region in economic hardship from which it has never fully recovered. Perched at one of the highest elevation points in the region, the mine stretched over 4,000 acres (16 km^{2}) and had six pits, the largest measuring over 1.6 km (0.99 mi) in length and the deepest being 183 m (600 ft), placing it below the water table; it is currently half filled with water.

Over 27 years of mining, the pits sustained numerous blasts daily, which some geologists claim have added to natural faults in the rocks. Other geologists and hydrogeologists have claimed that the site is well-situated for hydraulic containment (i.e. water flows in, but doesn't leach into surrounding groundwater or surface water systems).

There are significant tailings left from the manufacture of ore concentrate at the site. The Ontario Northland Railway operated a line into the Adams Mine facility during its years of operation.

The mine is currently owned by an American investor named Vito Gallo, through a numbered company incorporated in Ontario, and is the subject of a NAFTA Chapter 11 arbitration between Gallo, on behalf of the numbered company, and the Government of Canada. The claim is that the Government of Ontario failed to pay proper compensation when it passed legislation that revoked the permits that it had previously granted for the site to be operated as a landfill.

Vito G. Gallo claimed to be the owner and sole shareholder of 1532382 Ontario Inc., the enterprise which owned Adams Mine. The NAFTA tribunal questioned the lack of contemporaneous documents and found that a number of the corporate documents were backdated. Eventually the tribunal dismissed the claim and awarded $450 thousand USD in costs to Canada.

== Landfill proposal ==
Before the mine had shut production in the early 1990s, waste management planners from the Municipality of Metropolitan Toronto were examining its potential for a massive landfill, with waste to be shipped north in sealed intermodal shipping containers by CN and Ontario Northland on a 700 km (430 mi) route. It would be a municipal solid waste (MSW) facility on fractured bedrock using hydraulic containment and no landfill liner.

Proponents of the landfill plan pointed to its potential for spurring economic development in Kirkland Lake's struggling economy, while opponents pointed to environmental concerns such as the pit's unstable rock walls, which could potentially leach contaminants into the local groundwater supply.

The original landfill proposal considering the Adams Mine for Toronto's garbage can be traced to 1989. The following year, the government of Metro Toronto selected the Adams Mine as the preferred site for replacing the Keele Valley Landfill in Vaughan which was rapidly reaching capacity. On 2 April 1991, Ruth Grier, then provincial Minister of the Environment, stated that the provincial government would not allow Toronto to send its garbage to the Adams Mine. In 1995, Metro Toronto began a formal assessment, and the project passed all environmental tests and assessments. The project was rejected at the final vote, in December 1996, to extend the Toronto option on the ownership of the mine because of erroneous information presented by Jack Layton in which he cited the cumulative cost of the project rather than the year by year costs. At the same vote, the Chair, Alan Tonks also changed his position from support of the project to voting against. The final vote was 19–13 against the proposal to extend Toronto's option to use the site. This vote eventually led to Toronto shipping garbage to the US.

In 1996, the mine's owner, Notre Development, announced plans to revive the Adams Mine proposal through the private sector. Later the same year, the Progressive Conservative government of Mike Harris made significant changes to the province's Environmental Assessment Act - this resulted in dropping the requirements for a needs assessment and investigation of alternatives to developing a landfill. Technically, this was irrelevant to the Adams Mine proposal as it had already passed all assessments requested of the project. This gave the provincial government the sole authority to impose time and service limits on environmental assessments.

Investors involved in Notre Development included North Bay businessman Gord McGuinty. Peter Minogue, Harris' best friend whose wife was Harris' local campaign manager, is often mentioned as being involved with Notre but there is no evidence that he ever was.

Notre Development's 1996 proposal involved a consortium that was known as "Rail Cycle North"; this included the mine's owner, Notre Development, along with waste management companies Canadian Waste Services and Miller Waste Services, and Ontario Northland Railway and CN.

On December 16, 1997, the provincial Ministry of the Environment permitted only a limited Environmental Assessment Board hearing on the site's hydraulic containment system. Heavy opposition was expressed in the hearings, but on June 19, 1998, the EAB approved the project. The opponents filed an appeal with the provincial cabinet, which was subsequently rejected that August. An appeal was then filed for a judicial review. In July 1999, that appeal was rejected by the Divisional Court of Ontario and was similarly rejected by the Court of Appeal for Ontario in October of that year.

At the same time, opponents focused on lobbying the recently amalgamated city of Toronto to not accept the Rail Cycle North proposal. On August 3, 2000, Toronto City Council voted to approve the plan to transport the city's waste to Adams Mine. However, due to the volume of community opposition, council reviewed the issue and voted the proposal down that October. Toronto subsequently pursued a proposal to have its garbage shipped to the Carleton Farms Landfill site in Michigan, since the Keele Valley Landfill, as expected, had reached full capacity.

== Aftermath ==
From 2001 to 2003, Notre Development and the Rail Cycle North consortium continued to pursue avenues to revive the landfill proposal.

In 2003, the Ontario Liberal Party, led by Dalton McGuinty, won the provincial election and on April 5, 2004, provincial Minister of Natural Resources David Ramsay and Minister of the Environment Leona Dombrowsky introduced legislation which revoked all certificates and permits related to the Adams Mine proposal. This had the effect of permanently killing the 1996 plan.

Charlie Angus, a local musician and author, was one of the community leaders who organized the campaign against the Adams Mine proposal. He subsequently ran for political office, and was elected to Parliament in the 2004 federal election.

Toronto continued to export its trash to Michigan until 2006.

The shipping of garbage to Michigan briefly became an issue in the 2004 United States presidential election when John Kerry, on a campaign stop in Michigan, promised to ban the import of Canadian garbage if he was elected. In September, 2005, the Michigan state legislature voted almost unanimously against accepting Toronto's garbage.

== "Trash of the Titans" ==
During Toronto City Council deliberations over the waste site proposal, then-councillors Jack Layton and Olivia Chow surprised their council colleagues by playing The Simpsons 200th episode, "Trash of the Titans", in which the comically inept Homer Simpson becomes sanitation commissioner of Springfield and ends up shoving trash from his own and many other communities into a mine, to deleterious effect. "It was absolutely stunning," Layton later told The Globe and Mail. "It was so accurate to what was going on."

== See also ==
- List of mines in Ontario
