= Carleton Farms landfill =

Landfill site in Michigan, US

Coordinates: 42.093637°N 83.427472°W

The Carleton Farms landfill is located in Sumpter Township of Wayne County in the U.S. state of Michigan.

The landfill sits on 664 acres (2.69 km^{2}) of property and has a solid waste boundary of 388 acres (1.57 km^{2}). It is owned by Republic Services Inc., and is about 30 miles (48 km) west of Detroit since 2002. From 1970s to 2002 the site was operated by Carleton Farms Incorporated as a Liquid industrial waste generator.

As of September, 2005, one million tons of waste is shipped from Toronto to the Carleton Farms Landfill annually after 2002. This accounts for about 10% of Michigan's total waste.

The landfill is located near Crosswind Marsh Preserve, a reconstructed marsh created to replace the one formerly located at Detroit Metropolitan Wayne County Airport.

== See also ==
- Landfills in the United States
- Green Lane landfill - successor site to Carleton Farms for the City of Toronto
