= Opinion polling for the 2021 Canadian federal election =

Opinion polls for a Canadian federal election

This table provides a list of scientific, nationwide public opinion polls that were conducted from the 2019 Canadian federal election leading up to the 2021 Canadian federal election, which took place on September 20, 2021. For riding-specific polls see the list of 2021 constituency polls.

== National polls ==
=== Campaign period ===
Evolution of voting intentions according to polls conducted during the campaign period of the 2021 Canadian federal election, graphed from the data in the table below. Trendlines are 25-poll local regressions, with polls weighted by proximity in time and a logarithmic function of sample size. 95% confidence ribbons represent uncertainty about the trendlines, not the likelihood that actual election results would fall within the intervals.

Polling firm	Last date of polling (Note: Polls that share the same last date of polling are ordered from earliest (below) to latest (above) first date of polling. Polls that have identical field dates are placed in the order in which they were released/published (earliest below, latest above).)	Link	CPC	LPC	NDP	BQ	GPC	PPC	Others	Margin of error (Note: In cases when linked poll details distinguish between the margin of error associated with the total sample of respondents (including undecided and non-voters) and that of the subsample of decided/leaning voters, the former is included in the table. Also not included is the margin of error created by rounding to the nearest whole number or any margin of error from methodological sources. Most online polls (because of their opt-in method of recruiting panelists which results in a non-random sample) cannot have a margin of error. In such cases, shown is what the margin of error would be for a survey using a random probability-based sample of equivalent size.)	Sample size (Note: Refers to the total, "raw" sample size, including undecided and non-voters, and before demographic weighting is applied. Fractions in parentheses apply to rolling polls (see below) and indicate the proportion of the sample that is independent from the previous poll in the series.)	Polling method (Note: "Telephone" refers to traditional telephone polls conducted by live interviewers; "IVR" refers to automated Interactive Voice Response polls conducted by telephone; "online" refers to polls conducted exclusively over the internet; "telephone/online" refers to polls which combine results from both telephone and online surveys, or for which respondents are initially recruited by telephone and then asked to complete an online survey. "Rolling" polls contain overlapping data from one poll to the next.)	Lead
2021 election	September 20, 2021	HTML	33.7	32.6	17.8	7.6	2.3	4.9	1.1	—N/a	17,042,591	—N/a	1.1
Nanos Research	September 19, 2021		31.2	32.4	17.5	7.5	4.5	6.6	0.3	±3.6 pp	832	telephone	1.2
Forum Research	September 19, 2021		33.0	29.4	16.2	6.9	2.9	10.3	1.3	±3 pp	1,181	IVR	3.6
Research Co.	September 19, 2021		32	32	19	7	4	6	1	±3.1 pp	1,800	online	0
Mainstreet Research	September 19, 2021		30.4	33.4	18.1	6.0	2.1	9.3	0.7	±2.1 pp	2,211 (1/4)	IVR (rolling)	3.0
Abacus Data	September 19, 2021		32	31	19	7	4	6	2	±2.0 pp	2,431	online	1
EKOS	September 19, 2021		27.3	32.6	18.0	7.3	3.9	9.9	1	±2.4 pp	1,662 (1/4)	IVR (rolling)	5.3
Counsel	September 18, 2021		30	31	19	7	4	7	2	±1.7 pp	3,298	online	1
EKOS	September 18, 2021		26.9	32.1	18.5	7.2	4.4	10.0	0.9	±2.7 pp	1,327 (1/3)	IVR (rolling)	5.2
Nanos Research	September 18, 2021		30.5	30.8	21.0	6.5	4.7	5.6	1.0	±2.5 pp	1,679 (1/2)	telephone (rolling)	0.3
Mainstreet Research	September 18, 2021		30.5	31.9	19.0	6.4	2.5	8.9	0.8	±1.9 pp	2,494 (1/2)	IVR (rolling)	1.4
Abacus Data	September 18, 2021		31	32	21	6	3	6	1	±2.8 pp	1,271 (1/3)	online (rolling)	1
Ipsos	September 18, 2021		32	31	21	7	3	4	1	±2.3 pp	2,359	online/telephone	1
Angus Reid	September 18, 2021		32	30	20	7	3	5	1	±2.2 pp	2,042	online	2
EKOS	September 17, 2021		27.7	30.6	20.0	7.3	4.5	9.1	1	±2.6 pp	1,422 (1/3)	IVR (rolling)	2.9
Nanos Research	September 17, 2021		29.2	31.3	20.9	6.4	3.9	7.3	1.0	±2.8 pp	1,241 (1/3)	telephone (rolling)	2.1
Mainstreet Research	September 17, 2021		30.8	31.0	19.9	6.6	2.5	8.4	0.9	±2.2 pp	1,871 (1/3)	IVR (rolling)	0.2
Abacus Data	September 17, 2021		32	33	21	6	2	5	1	±2.7 pp	1,333 (1/3)	online (rolling)	1
Leger	September 17, 2021		33	32	19	7	2	6	1	±2.5 pp	2,147	online	1
EKOS	September 16, 2021		30.6	30.4	18.5	7.0	4.1	8.5	0.9	±2.6 pp	1,384 (1/3)	IVR (rolling)	0.2
Nanos Research	September 16, 2021		30.4	31.9	20.3	5.8	3.2	7.5	0.8	±2.8 pp	1,228 (1/3)	telephone (rolling)	1.5
Mainstreet Research	September 16, 2021		31.9	29.5	19.5	6.4	3.0	8.8	0.9	±2.3 pp	1,749 (1/3)	IVR (rolling)	2.4
Abacus Data	September 16, 2021		30	34	21	6	3	5	1	±2.9 pp	1,604 (1/3)	online (rolling)	4
Campaign Research	September 16, 2021		31	31	21	7	4	5	1	±1 pp	5,163	online	0
EKOS	September 15, 2021		30.4	32.1	18.4	6.3	3.8	8.2	0.7	±2.6 pp	1,446 (1/3)	IVR (rolling)	1.7
Nanos Research	September 15, 2021		30.3	31.9	21.2	6.4	3.2	6.7	0.4	±2.8 pp	1,237 (1/3)	telephone (rolling)	1.6
Mainstreet Research	September 15, 2021		32.0	30.2	18.9	6.4	2.9	8.7	0.8	±2.3 pp	1,753 (1/3)	IVR (rolling)	1.8
Abacus Data	September 15, 2021		31	33	22	5	3	5	2	±2.9 pp	1,578	online (rolling)	2
EKOS	September 14, 2021		31.8	31.8	19.1	6.4	3.3	6.9	0.7	±2.7 pp	1,322 (1/3)	IVR (rolling)	0.0
Nanos Research	September 14, 2021		31.2	30.5	21.4	6.2	3.7	6.8	0.3	±2.8 pp	1,281 (1/3)	telephone (rolling)	0.7
Mainstreet Research	September 14, 2021		31.4	31.4	17.5	7.0	3.3	8.7	0.6	±2.3 pp	1,774 (1/3)	IVR (rolling)	0.0
EKOS	September 13, 2021		32.2	31.2	19.4	6.2	3.1	7.3	0.6	±2.8 pp	1,241 (1/3)	IVR (rolling)	1.0
Research Co.	September 13, 2021		30	34	20	7	3	5	1	±3.1 pp	1,000	online	4
Nanos Research	September 13, 2021		31.2	32.3	18.9	6.4	3.8	6.7	0.8	±2.8 pp	1,264 (1/3)	telephone (rolling)	1.1
Mainstreet Research	September 13, 2021		29.5	33.5	16.4	7.5	3.3	9.1	0.7	±2.3 pp	1,732 (1/3)	IVR (rolling)	4.0
Ipsos	September 13, 2021		32	32	21	7	4	3	1	±2.5 pp	2,001	online/telephone	0
Leger	September 13, 2021		32	32	20	7	3	5	1	±2.19 pp	2,001	online	0
YouGov	September 13, 2021		32	29	19	6	5	5	4	±3.4 pp	925	online	3
Earnscliffe/Leger	September 12, 2021		32	32	20	7	4	5	1	—N/a	1,549	online	0
Innovative Research	September 12, 2021		28	33	22	7	4	4	1	—N/a	3,203	online	5
EKOS	September 12, 2021		31.9	30.3	20.3	6.0	3.7	7.0	0.8	±2.9 pp	1,115 (1/3)	IVR (rolling)	1.6
Nanos Research	September 12, 2021		30.2	33.2	18.6	6.8	3.8	6.6	0.8	±2.8 pp	1,268 (1/3)	telephone (rolling)	3.0
Mainstreet Research	September 12, 2021		28.6	33.5	17.1	7.9	3.7	8.4	0.9	±2.3 pp	1,711 (1/3)	IVR (rolling)	4.9
Abacus Data	September 12, 2021		32	32	21	6	3	4	2	±2.1 pp	2,000	online	0
Angus Reid	September 12, 2021		32	30	21	7	2	6	2	±2.5 pp	1,840	online	2
Counsel	September 11, 2021		30.2	29.7	21.9	6.5	4.4	5.6	1.7	±1.7 pp	3,320	online	0.5
EKOS	September 11, 2021		32.8	31.1	19.0	4.7	3.9	7.8	0.7	±2.9 pp	1,162 (1/3)	IVR (rolling)	1.7
Nanos Research	September 11, 2021		30.7	34.0	18.6	6.6	4.1	5.1	0.9	±2.8 pp	1,252 (1/3)	telephone (rolling)	3.3
Mainstreet Research	September 11, 2021		29.4	33.4	17.6	7.4	3.1	8.1	1.0	±2.3 pp	1,706 (1/3)	IVR (rolling)	4.0
Forum Research	September 10, 2021		31	28	18	8	4	9	2	±3 pp	1,579	IVR	3
EKOS	September 10, 2021		30.9	30.4	19.9	4.6	4.3	9.1	0.8	±2.8 pp	1,238 (1/3)	IVR (rolling)	0.5
Nanos Research	September 10, 2021		30.1	34.4	19.0	6.4	4.6	5.0	0.7	±2.8 pp	1,249 (1/3)	telephone (rolling)	4.3
Mainstreet Research	September 10, 2021		30.2	33.9	17.9	6.4	2.6	7.9	1.0	±2.3 pp	1,751 (1/3)	IVR (rolling)	3.7
	September 9, 2021	Leaders' Debates Commission English debate											
EKOS	September 9, 2021		33.2	29.7	16.7	4.3	3.8	11.7	0.6	±2.7 pp	1,303 (1/3)	IVR (rolling)	3.5
Nanos Research	September 9, 2021		33.3	31.3	19.2	6.6	3.8	5.0	0.9	±2.8 pp	1,269 (1/3)	telephone (rolling)	2.0
Mainstreet Research	September 9, 2021		32.0	32.9	18.5	5.3	2.2	8.4	0.8	±2.3 pp	1,776 (1/3)	IVR (rolling)	0.9
	September 8, 2021	Leaders' Debates Commission French debate											
EKOS	September 8, 2021		33.6	30.7	15.7	4.1	4.1	11.2	0.7	±2.7 pp	1,365 (1/3)	IVR (rolling)	2.9
Nanos Research	September 8, 2021		32.6	30.6	20.3	5.5	4.2	5.3	1.4	±2.8 pp	1,266 (1/3)	telephone (rolling)	2.0
Mainstreet Research	September 8, 2021		32.9	32.3	19.0	5.5	1.9	7.9	0.5	±2.3 pp	1,768 (1/3)	IVR (rolling)	0.6
EKOS	September 7, 2021		34.3	31.8	16.4	4.0	3.2	9.5	0.7	±2.8 pp	1,202 (1/3)	IVR (rolling)	2.5
Mainstreet Research	September 7, 2021		33.5	30.0	20.7	5.5	2.2	7.6	0.4	±2.3 pp	1,755 (1/3)	IVR (rolling)	3.5
Nanos Research	September 7, 2021		32.6	31.6	21.1	5.0	4.4	4.3	0.9	±2.8 pp	1,288 (1/3)	telephone (rolling)	1.0
EKOS	September 6, 2021		33.7	30.8	19.2	3.8	3.8	7.9	0.8	±3.0 pp	1,062 (1/3)	IVR (rolling)	2.9
Mainstreet Research	September 6, 2021		33.5	31.1	19.6	6.4	2.4	6.4	0.6	±2.3 pp	1,794 (1/3)	IVR (rolling)	2.4
Leger	September 6, 2021		33	33	21	6	3	3	<1	±1.8 pp	3,002	online	0
Ipsos	September 6, 2021		35	32	21	7	2	2	—N/a	±2.9 pp	1,500	online	3
Angus Reid	September 6, 2021		35	32	20	6	2	5	1	±2.5 pp	1,709	online	3
Abacus Data	September 6, 2021		32	32	21	7	3	3	1	±1.9 pp	2,875	online	0
Earnscliffe/Leger	September 5, 2021		33	33	21	6	3	4	1	—N/a	1,521	online	0
EKOS	September 5, 2021		34.1	27.9	20.3	5.6	3.6	7.9	0.7	±3.0 pp	1,053 (1/3)	IVR (rolling)	6.2
Nanos Research	September 5, 2021		32.0	34.1	20.9	4.0	4.5	3.8	0.6	±2.8 pp	1,269 (1/3)	telephone (rolling)	2.1
Mainstreet Research	September 5, 2021		34.0	31.1	18.4	6.2	2.6	6.7	0.9	±2.3 pp	1,857 (1/3)	IVR (rolling)	2.9
EKOS	September 4, 2021		34.5	28.1	20.5	4.8	4.4	6.9	0.8	±2.9 pp	1,158 (1/3)	IVR (rolling)	6.4
Nanos Research	September 4, 2021		34.9	33.4	18.9	4.8	4.2	3.5	0.4	±2.8 pp	1,248 (1/3)	telephone (rolling)	1.5
Mainstreet Research	September 4, 2021		34.6	31.8	17.5	6.3	2.3	6.3	1.3	±2.3 pp	1,842 (1/3)	IVR (rolling)	2.8
Abacus Data	September 4, 2021		33	32	21	7	3	3	1	±1.9 pp	2,692	online	1
EKOS	September 3, 2021		35.0	28.8	19.6	4.9	4.6	6.3	0.8	±2.8 pp	1,274 (1/3)	IVR (rolling)	6.2
Nanos Research	September 3, 2021		35.5	33.0	18.7	4.1	4.4	3.9	0.4	±2.8 pp	1,214 (1/3)	telephone (rolling)	2.5
Mainstreet Research	September 3, 2021		34.3	32.1	18.2	5.6	2.2	6.5	1.2	±2.3 pp	1,820 (1/3)	IVR (rolling)	2.2
	September 2, 2021	TVA French leaders' debate											
EKOS	September 2, 2021		35.8	29.5	19.4	3.9	4.5	5.8	0.9	±2.9 pp	1,161 (1/3)	IVR (rolling)	6.3
Nanos Research	September 2, 2021		35.7	30.7	18.3	5.5	4.5	4.8	0.5	±2.8 pp	1,233 (1/3)	telephone (rolling)	5.0
Mainstreet Research	September 2, 2021		35.9	30.7	18.8	5.1	2.4	5.9	1.3	±2.3 pp	1,792 (1/3)	IVR (rolling)	5.2
EKOS	September 1, 2021		35.5	30.7	18.8	4.7	3.7	5.8	0.8	±2.9 pp	1,152 (1/3)	IVR (rolling)	4.8
Nanos Research	September 1, 2021		34.2	30.5	20.1	6.0	4.0	4.8	0.3	±2.8 pp	1,270 (1/3)	telephone (rolling)	3.7
Mainstreet Research	September 1, 2021		36.0	30.9	18.7	4.8	2.6	5.8	1.3	±2.3 pp	1,757 (1/3)	IVR (rolling)	5.1
Campaign Research	September 1, 2021		33	30	22	6	4	4	1	±2 pp	3,011	online	3
EKOS	August 31, 2021		36.0	30.7	18.9	5.3	3.2	5.2	0.7	±2.9 pp	1,122 (1/3)	IVR (rolling)	5.3
Nanos Research	August 31, 2021		33.7	31.0	20.3	6.8	3.5	4.1	0.6	±2.8 pp	1,275 (1/3)	telephone (rolling)	2.7
Mainstreet Research	August 31, 2021		37.1	29.2	19.1	4.7	2.8	5.7	1.3	±2.3 pp	1,703 (1/3)	IVR (rolling)	7.9
EKOS	August 30, 2021		35.9	31.3	18.0	5.8	3.2	5.0	0.7	±3.2 pp	942 (1/3)	IVR (rolling)	4.6
Research Co.	August 30, 2021		32	33	22	6	4	3	<1	±3.1 pp	1,000	online	1
Nanos Research	August 30, 2021		32.5	33.2	19.2	6.4	4.6	3.3	0.7	±2.8 pp	1,308 (1/3)	telephone (rolling)	0.7
Mainstreet Research	August 30, 2021		36.9	29.2	18.8	5.7	2.7	5.7	1.0	±2.3 pp	1,763 (1/3)	IVR (rolling)	7.7
Ipsos	August 30, 2021		32	31	23	7	4	1	2	±2.9 pp	1,501	online	1
Leger	August 30, 2021		34	30	24	7	2	3	1	±2.18 pp	2,005	online	4
Innovative Research	August 30, 2021		29	32	23	8	4	4	1	—N/a	2,806	online	3
Earnscliffe/Leger	August 29, 2021		34	30	24	7	3	2	1	—N/a	1,544	online	4
Angus Reid	August 29, 2021		33	30	21	7	3	4	2	±2.5 pp	1,639	online	3
Nanos Research	August 29, 2021		32.7	31.3	20.0	5.8	5.9	3.6	0.6	±2.8 pp	1,267 (1/3)	telephone (rolling)	1.4
Mainstreet Research	August 29, 2021		37.6	28.5	19.3	6.3	2.5	5.1	0.6	±2.3 pp	1,767 (1/3)	IVR (rolling)	9.1
EKOS	August 29, 2021		36.8	29.4	19.3	5.6	3.2	5.0	0.7	±2.8 pp	1,232 (1/4)	IVR (rolling)	7.4
Abacus Data	August 29, 2021		32	33	22	8	2	3	1	±2.2 pp	2,000	online	1
Nanos Research	August 28, 2021		33.2	31.1	19.9	5.5	5.7	4.2	0.4	±2.8 pp	1,248 (1/3)	telephone (rolling)	2.1
Mainstreet Research	August 28, 2021		37.8	28.3	19.4	6.9	2.2	4.9	0.5	±2.3 pp	1,759 (1/3)	IVR (rolling)	9.5
EKOS	August 28, 2021		36.7	29.1	17.7	5.5	3.7	6.5	0.7	±2.9 pp	1,166 (1/4)	IVR (rolling)	7.6
Nanos Research	August 27, 2021		33.3	30.8	21.7	5.3	4.9	3.8	0.3	±2.8 pp	1,243 (1/3)	telephone (rolling)	2.5
Mainstreet Research	August 27, 2021		37.4	29.3	19.6	6.2	2.4	4.5	0.6	±2.38 pp	1,684 (1/3)	IVR (rolling)	8.1
EKOS	August 27, 2021		34.8	28.5	19.8	5.5	3.8	6.8	0.8	±2.6 pp	1,426 (1/4)	IVR (rolling)	6.3
Nanos Research	August 26, 2021		33.6	33.4	19.9	5.3	4.6	3.1	0.2	±2.8 pp	1,200 (1/3)	telephone (rolling)	0.2
Mainstreet Research	August 26, 2021		36.8	31.4	18.5	5.4	2.6	4.3	1.0	±2.43 pp	1,619 (1/3)	IVR (rolling)	5.4
EKOS	August 26, 2021		34.5	29.0	20.3	5.1	4.2	6.3	0.6	±2.6 pp	1,424 (1/4)	IVR (rolling)	5.5
Nanos Research	August 25, 2021		34.4	33.6	18.9	5.3	4.3	3.1	0.3	±2.8 pp	1,288 (1/3)	telephone (rolling)	0.8
Mainstreet Research	August 25, 2021		34.7	31.8	19.1	5.4	3.1	4.6	1.3	±2.6 pp	1,549 (1/3)	IVR (rolling)	2.9
EKOS	August 25, 2021		32.8	29.4	20.7	6.0	3.8	6.7	0.7	±2.7 pp	1,352 (1/4)	IVR (rolling)	3.4
Nanos Research	August 24, 2021		32.7	35.9	16.8	5.6	4.8	3.7	0.5	±2.8 pp	1,261 (1/3)	telephone (rolling)	3.2
Mainstreet Research	August 24, 2021		33.7	31.2	19.0	6.0	3.1	5.8	1.2	±2.6 pp	1,417 (1/3)	IVR (rolling)	2.5
EKOS	August 24, 2021		32.2	31.4	20.5	5.7	3.5	5.7	0.9	±2.8 pp	1,233 (1/4)	IVR (rolling)	0.8
Nanos Research	August 23, 2021		33.2	33.5	18.9	5.4	4.7	3.6	0.7	±2.8 pp	1,205 (1/3)	telephone (rolling)	0.3
Mainstreet Research	August 23, 2021		32.3	30.0	19.0	7.0	3.3	7.4	0.9	±2.6 pp	1,369 (1/3)	IVR (rolling)	2.3
EKOS	August 23, 2021		32.8	32.0	19.6	6.2	3.5	5.0	0.8	±2.8 pp	1,192 (1/4)	IVR (rolling)	0.8
Ipsos	August 23, 2021		32	33	21	6	5	2	1	±3.5 pp	1,500	online	1
Angus Reid	August 23, 2021		31	33	22	7	3	3	1	±2.5 pp	1,692	online	2
Earnscliffe/Leger	August 22, 2021		30	33	21	7	4	3	1	—N/a	1,527	online	3
Leger	August 22, 2021		31	33	21	7	4	3	1	±2.2 pp	2,002	online	2
Nanos Research	August 22, 2021		31.4	32.5	20.8	6.1	5.1	3.3	0.8	±2.8 pp	1,200 (1/3)	telephone (rolling)	1.1
Mainstreet Research	August 22, 2021		31.7	32.4	18.2	5.9	3.3	6.6	1.0	±2.6 pp	1,467 (1/3)	IVR (rolling)	0.7
EKOS	August 22, 2021		31.7	32.9	17.0	6.9	4.3	6.3	0.9	±2.8 pp	1,207 (1/4)	IVR (rolling)	1.2
Abacus Data	August 22, 2021		29	33	23	6	3	4	2	±2.2 pp	2,000	online	4
Nanos Research	August 21, 2021		32.4	34.3	19.3	6.3	4.5	2.4	0.8	±2.8 pp	1,209 (1/3)	telephone (rolling)	1.9
Mainstreet Research	August 21, 2021		30.9	34.0	19.7	5.9	3.4	5.1	1.0	±2.6 pp	1,425 (1/3)	IVR (rolling)	3.1
EKOS	August 21, 2021		32.8	32.4	16.6	6.1	5.2	6.1	0.8	±2.7 pp	1,293 (1/4)	IVR (rolling)	0.4
Nanos Research	August 20, 2021		32.3	34.2	20.2	6.1	4.3	2.1	0.9	±2.8 pp	1,200	telephone (rolling)	1.9
EKOS	August 20, 2021		32.9	31.4	18.3	6.2	4.9	5.7	0.6	±2.6 pp	1,444 (1/4)	IVR (rolling)	1.5
Mainstreet Research	August 20, 2021		32.6	33.9	19.3	4.9	3.7	4.4	1.3	±2.6 pp	1,449 (1/4)	IVR (rolling)	1.3
EKOS	August 19, 2021		31.9	32.5	19.2	5.7	4.9	5.2	0.7	±2.6 pp	1,426 (1/4)	IVR (rolling)	0.6
Mainstreet Research	August 19, 2021		33.1	33.4	19.8	5.0	3.6	4.0	1.1	±2.6 pp	1,433 (1/4)	IVR (rolling)	0.3
Counsel	August 18, 2021		28.5	30.3	21.7	7.8	4.8	4.3	2.6	±1.7 pp	3,499	online	1.8
EKOS	August 18, 2021		32.0	33.3	20.1	5.5	4.5	3.9	0.7	±2.7 pp	1,281 (1/4)	IVR (rolling)	1.3
Mainstreet Research	August 18, 2021	Twitter	33.0	33.6	18.4	5.5	4.0	4.5	1.1	±2.59 pp	1,571 (1/4)	IVR (rolling)	0.6
EKOS	August 17, 2021		30.6	34.3	21.0	5.4	4.2	3.7	0.8	±3.2 pp	913 (1/3)	IVR (rolling)	3.7
Mainstreet Research	August 17, 2021	Twitter	31.7	33.8	18.9	6.1	3.9	4.5	1.1	±2.7 pp	1,385 (1/3)	IVR (rolling)	2.1
Angus Reid	August 17, 2021		30	36	20	6	4	4	1	±2.5 pp	1,614	online	6
EKOS	August 16, 2021		29.4	33.7	20.5	5.4	5.7	4.2	1.1	±3.4 pp	840 (1/3)	IVR (rolling)	4.3
Mainstreet Research	August 16, 2021	Twitter	30	33	20	6	4	5	—N/a	±2.7 pp	1,372 (1/3)	IVR (rolling)	3
Ipsos	August 16, 2021		31	36	20	6	5	1	1	±2.5 pp	2,001	online/telephone	5
Innovative Research	August 16, 2021		26	38	21	6	4	3	1	—N/a	1,412	online	12
Abacus Data	August 16, 2021		28	33	22	7	5	3	1	±2.6 pp	1,500	online	5
Forum Research	August 15, 2021		31	28	19	7	8	5	3	±3 pp	1,203	IVR	3
Earnscliffe/Leger	August 15, 2021		29	35	20	7	6	2	2	—N/a	1,515	online	6
EKOS	August 15, 2021		30.3	34.8	17.4	4.2	6.9	5.1	1.2	±3.4 pp	856	IVR (rolling)	4.5
Leger	August 15, 2021		30	35	20	7	5	2	1	±2.18 pp	2,007	online	5
Mainstreet Research	August 15, 2021		30.1	33.1	19.1	5.9	3.9	5.6	2.2	±2.7 pp	1,331	IVR (rolling)	3.0
Polling firm	Last date of polling	Link							Others	Margin of error	Sample size	Polling method	Lead
Polling firm	Last date of polling	Link	CPC	LPC	NDP	BQ	GPC	PPC	Others	Margin of error	Sample size	Polling method	Lead

=== Pre-campaign period ===
Evolution of voting intentions according to polls conducted during the pre-campaign period of the 2021 Canadian federal election, graphed from the data in the table below. Trendlines are 25-poll local regressions, with polls weighted by proximity in time and a logarithmic function of sample size. 95% confidence ribbons represent uncertainty about the trendlines, not the likelihood that actual election results would fall within the intervals.

Polling firm	Last date of polling	Link	CPC	LPC	NDP	BQ	GPC	PPC	Others (Note: Support for other parties may include the People's Party of Canada depending on the poll.)	Margin of error	Sample size	Polling method	Lead
	August 15, 2021	A snap federal election was called for September 20, 2021											
Nanos Research	August 13, 2021		28.4	33.4	20.7	6.3	7.9	1.9	—N/a	±3.1 pp	1,000 (1/4)	telephone (rolling)	5.0
Leger	August 12, 2021		30	35	19	7	5	3	1	±2.4 pp	1,615	online	5
Mainstreet Research	August 11, 2021		29.2	34.6	17.9	5.7	5.3	—N/a	7.3	±3.3 pp	909	IVR	5.4
Innovative Research	August 11, 2021		25	40	17	7	6	—N/a	5	—N/a	1,282	online	15
Abacus Data	August 11, 2021		28	37	20	5	5	4	2	±1.8 pp	3,000	online	9
Angus Reid	August 10, 2021		31	36	19	7	3	—N/a	5	±2 pp	1,615	online	5
EKOS	August 10, 2021		27.7	36.3	18.6	5.3	6.8	4.6	0.7	±2.6 pp	1,482	IVR	8.6
Nanos Research	August 6, 2021		27.3	37.0	19.0	5.8	7.0	2.2	—N/a	±3.1 pp	1,000 (1/4)	telephone (rolling)	9.7
Innovative Research	August 4, 2021		25	39	19	7	6	3	1	—N/a	1,953	online	14
Angus Reid	August 3, 2021		30	35	19	7	3	—N/a	6	±2.5 pp	1,605	online	5
Abacus Data	August 2, 2021		25	37	20	8	6	—N/a	—N/a	±2.2 pp	2,000	online	12
Leger	August 1, 2021		29	36	20	7	4	3	2	±2.15 pp	2,079	online	7
Nanos Research	July 30, 2021		25.5	38.8	19.5	5.9	6.4	2.6	—N/a	±3.1 pp	1,000 (1/4)	telephone (rolling)	13.3
EKOS	July 28, 2021		28.6	39.0	17.9	—N/a	4.2	—N/a	—N/a	±3 pp	1,067	IVR	10.4
Angus Reid	July 27, 2021		30	33	21	7	4	—N/a	5	±2 pp	1,606	online	3
Mainstreet Research	July 26, 2021		31.7	34.4	16.2	5.1	4.7	—N/a	7.9	±2.7 pp	1,299	IVR	2.7
Nanos Research	July 23, 2021		25.0	37.3	21.4	6.0	5.5	3.5	—N/a	±3.1 pp	1,000 (1/4)	telephone (rolling)	12.3
Innovative Research	July 21, 2021		27	41	17	6	5	3	1	—N/a	834	online	14
EKOS	July 21, 2021		27.7	35.2	18.5	5.6	5.2	4.5	3.2	±2.2 pp	1,934	IVR	7.5
Ipsos	July 20, 2021		30	36	20	7	3	2	2	±3.5 pp	1,000	online	6
Angus Reid	July 16, 2021		31	33	20	7	3	4	2	±2.0 pp	1,625	online	2
Nanos Research	July 16, 2021		23.6	39.3	21.7	4.8	6.8	3.0	—N/a	±3.1 pp	1,000 (1/4)	telephone (rolling)	15.7
Nanos Research	July 9, 2021		23.9	37.8	21.3	—N/a	6.5	—N/a	—N/a	±3.1 pp	1,000 (1/4)	telephone (rolling)	13.9
Leger	July 4, 2021		30	33	19	7	5	4	2	±2.52 pp	1,518	online	3
Nanos Research	July 2, 2021		23.6	38.1	20.4	5.1	7.5	4.3	—N/a	±3.1 pp	1,000 (1/4)	telephone (rolling)	14.5
Abacus Data	June 30, 2021		25	37	20	7	6	3	1	±2.6 pp	1,500	online	12
Nanos Research	June 25, 2021		24.7	37.1	19.3	5.8	7.9	4.1	—N/a	±3.1 pp	1,000 (1/4)	telephone (rolling)	12.4
Ipsos	June 22, 2021		26	38	20	8	7	1	1	±2.9 pp	1,501	online/telephone	12
Abacus Data	June 21, 2021		27	37	18	9	5	3	1	±2.2 pp	2,070	online	10
Leger	June 20, 2021		30	34	20	8	5	—N/a	4	±2.49 pp	1,542	online	4
Nanos Research	June 18, 2021		25.4	37.4	18.2	7.0	6.5	4.2	—N/a	±3.1 pp	1,000 (1/4)	telephone (rolling)	12.0
Abacus Data	June 16, 2021		29	34	21	8	6	1	1	±2.6 pp	1,500	online	5
Research Co.	June 14, 2021		30	38	20	5	5	1	1	±3.1 pp	1,000	online	8
Mainstreet Research	June 14, 2021		27.3	37.7	17.2	5.0	5.9	—N/a	6.9	±2.7 pp	1,291	IVR	10.4
EKOS	June 14, 2021		26.2	35.0	17.3	6.6	8.3	3.9	2.7	±2.6 pp	1,412	IVR	8.8
Nanos Research	June 11, 2021		26.4	37.5	17.5	7.4	7.0	3.6	—N/a	±3.1 pp	1,000 (1/4)	telephone (rolling)	11.1
Innovative Research	June 8, 2021		26	37	17	7	8	—N/a	5	—N/a	1,043	online	11
Angus Reid	June 7, 2021		30	33	21	6	4	—N/a	5	±2.0 pp	4,948	online	3
Leger	June 6, 2021		29	32	22	6	6	—N/a	5	±2.5 pp	1,539	online	3
Counsel	June 4, 2021		27.6	31.9	17.9	7.7	6.9	4.2	3.7	±1.7 pp	3,175	online	4.3
Nanos Research	June 4, 2021		27.3	38.0	17.1	6.6	6.1	3.9	—N/a	±3.1 pp	1,000 (1/4)	telephone (rolling)	10.7
Innovative Research	May 31, 2021		27	38	15	8	8	4	1	—N/a	2,579	online	11
Abacus Data	May 28, 2021		31	34	17	7	7	2	2	±2.1 pp	2,000	online	3
Nanos Research	May 28, 2021		27.3	38.2	17.0	7.7	6.1	3.1	—N/a	±3.1 pp	1,000 (1/4)	telephone (rolling)	10.9
EKOS	May 27, 2021	Twitter	27.8	35.4	17.9	5.6	7.0	4.0	3.0	±1.7 pp	1,948	IVR	7.6
Leger	May 23, 2021		30	34	19	7	7	—N/a	3	±2.43 pp	1,624	online	4
Mainstreet Research	May 23, 2021		31.4	37.2	13.3	5.2	6.9	—N/a	6.0	±2.7 pp	1,332	IVR	5.8
Nanos Research	May 21, 2021		28.7	36.9	16.1	7.2	7.0	3.6	—N/a	±3.1 pp	1,000 (1/4)	telephone (rolling)	8.2
Angus Reid	May 17, 2021		32	34	18	7	5	—N/a	4	±2.5 pp	1,601	online	2
Leger	May 16, 2021		31	32	19	7	8	—N/a	2	±2.5 pp	1,516	online	1
Ipsos	May 14, 2021		29	38	21	6	5	1	1	±3.5 pp	1,001	online	9
Nanos Research	May 14, 2021		28.4	36.9	16.7	7.5	6.3	3.5	—N/a	±3.1 pp	1,000 (1/4)	telephone (rolling)	8.5
Abacus Data	May 12, 2021		32	34	17	6	7	3	1	±2.6 pp	1,500	online	2
Leger	May 9, 2021		30	33	19	7	7	—N/a	4	±2.51 pp	1,529	online	3
Nanos Research	May 7, 2021		29.5	35.2	16.6	8.5	6.8	2.8	—N/a	±3.1 pp	1,000 (1/4)	telephone (rolling)	5.7
EKOS	May 6, 2021		26.1	36.0	19.7	4.0	7.1	4.9	2.2	±2.3 pp	1,808	IVR	9.9
Innovative Research	May 5, 2021		27	40	18	4	7	3	1	—N/a	2,738	online	13
Nanos Research	April 30, 2021		31.1	35.2	16.5	7.3	7.2	2.0	—N/a	±3.1 pp	1,000 (1/4)	telephone (rolling)	4.1
EKOS	April 28, 2021		29.7	34.6	16.9	—N/a	7.4	—N/a	—N/a	±1.8 pp	2,902	IVR	4.9
Leger	April 25, 2021		28	34	20	7	7	—N/a	4	±2.48 pp	1,548	online	6
Angus Reid	April 25, 2021		32	34	20	7	5	—N/a	5	±2.2 pp	2,008	online	2
Abacus Data	April 25, 2021		29	36	17	7	7	2	1	±2.1 pp	2,201	online	7
Nanos Research	April 23, 2021		28.8	36.3	18.1	7.2	7.2	1.9	—N/a	±3.1 pp	1,000 (1/4)	telephone (rolling)	7.5
Leger	April 21, 2021		30	35	19	6	6	—N/a	5	±2.5 pp	1,504	online	5
Ipsos	April 21, 2021		27	38	19	7	7	—N/a	1	±3.5 pp	1,000	online	11
Abacus Data	April 21, 2021	Twitter	28	39	16	7	7	—N/a	—N/a	—N/a	1,900	online	11
Mainstreet Research	April 18, 2021		29.6	36.8	14.9	5.8	6.6	—N/a	6.2	±2.7 pp	1,246	IVR	7.2
Nanos Research	April 16, 2021		29.0	36.1	18.5	6.8	7.4	1.7	—N/a	±3.1 pp	1,000 (1/4)	telephone (rolling)	7.1
Abacus Data	April 14, 2021		29	37	19	6	6	2	2	±2.1 pp	1,981	online	8
Innovative Research	April 13, 2021		27	39	17	4	8	4	1	—N/a	2,390	online	12
Stratcom	April 13, 2021		30.2	33.1	15.9	6.4	7.4	—N/a	7.1	±1.8 pp	6,537	IVR	2.9
Leger	April 11, 2021		30	35	18	7	7	—N/a	3	±2.53 pp	1,504	online	5
Ipsos	April 9, 2021		30	40	13	9	5	—N/a	3	±3.5 pp	1,001	online	10
Nanos Research	April 9, 2021		29.2	37.6	18.9	5.9	7.0	1.2	—N/a	±3.1 pp	1,000 (1/4)	telephone (rolling)	8.4
Campaign Research	April 8, 2021		33	34	17	7	7	—N/a	2	±2 pp	2,880	online	1
EKOS	April 6, 2021		30.4	32.0	16.3	—N/a	8.3	—N/a	—N/a	±2.3 pp	1,734	IVR	1.6
Nanos Research	April 2, 2021		27.0	39.2	18.0	5.6	8.0	1.5	—N/a	±3.1 pp	1,000 (1/4)	telephone (rolling)	12.2
Abacus Data	March 30, 2021		30	38	17	7	6	1	1	±2.1 pp	2,000	online	8
Leger	March 28, 2021		28	35	22	7	6	—N/a	2	±2.51 pp	1,523	online	7
Nanos Research	March 26, 2021		27.4	38.7	17.4	5.8	7.9	2.0	—N/a	±3.1 pp	1,000 (1/4)	telephone (rolling)	11.3
Mainstreet Research	March 22, 2021		34	37	10	8	6	—N/a	5	±2.23 pp	1,939	IVR	3
Nanos Research	March 19, 2021		27.7	38.0	17.0	5.9	8.0	2.6	—N/a	±3.1 pp	1,000 (1/4)	telephone (rolling)	10.3
Abacus Data	March 17, 2021		29	33	19	7	8	3	1	±2.1 pp	2,000	online	4
Research Co.	March 15, 2021		28	37	20	7	6	1	1	±3.1 pp	1,000	online	9
Leger	March 14, 2021		31	36	19	6	5	—N/a	4	±2.52 pp	1,512	online	5
Nanos Research	March 12, 2021		27.6	36.7	17.0	5.6	8.5	3.7	—N/a	±3.1 pp	1,000 (1/4)	telephone (rolling)	9.1
Abacus Data	March 5, 2021		30	34	18	8	7	2	1	±2.1 pp	2,000	online	4
Nanos Research	March 5, 2021		29.7	34.8	16.9	6.2	7.4	4.1	—N/a	±3.1 pp	1,000 (1/4)	telephone (rolling)	5.1
Ipsos	March 3, 2021		28	35	16	7	10	1	2	±3.5 pp	1,000	online	7
Angus Reid	March 3, 2021		31	35	19	6	4	2	3	±1.4 pp	5,004	online	4
Leger	February 28, 2021		28	35	23	7	6	—N/a	2	±2.50 pp	1,532	online	7
Nanos Research	February 26, 2021		29.4	35.0	16.5	6.2	7.2	4.4	—N/a	±3.1 pp	1,000 (1/4)	telephone (rolling)	5.6
Mainstreet Research	February 24, 2021		31	36	15	6	7	—N/a	5	±2.55 pp	1,476	IVR	5
Angus Reid	February 19, 2021		31	34	20	7	5	2	2	±2.2 pp	1,987	online	3
Nanos Research	February 19, 2021		29.0	35.2	16.8	6.8	7.2	4.3	—N/a	±3.1 pp	1,000 (1/4)	telephone (rolling)	6.2
EKOS	February 16, 2021		31.4	32.9	14.9	—N/a	8.6	—N/a	—N/a	±2.43 pp	1,623	IVR	1.5
Leger	February 14, 2021		29	36	20	6	7	—N/a	3	±2.50 pp	1,535	online	7
Nanos Research	February 12, 2021		30.3	34.2	17.0	7.5	6.7	3.3	—N/a	±3.1 pp	1,000 (1/4)	telephone (rolling)	3.9
Ipsos	February 10, 2021		30	33	20	8	8	—N/a	2	±3.5 pp	1,000	online	3
Nanos Research	February 5, 2021		28.9	35.9	16.4	7.4	7.4	3.1	—N/a	±3.1 pp	1,000 (1/4)	telephone (rolling)	7.0
EKOS	February 3, 2021		28.1	36.5	14.5	—N/a	9.3	—N/a	—N/a	±4.1 pp	548	online	8.4
Abacus Data	February 3, 2021		31	32	18	8	7	2	1	±1.6 pp	3,930	online	1
Innovative Research	February 1, 2021		28	38	15	7	8	—N/a	4	—N/a	4,449	online	10
Leger	January 31, 2021		28	37	22	7	5	—N/a	2	±2.48 pp	1,559	online	9
Campaign Research	January 30, 2021		30	34	19	6	8	—N/a	3	±2 pp	2,413	online	4
Nanos Research	January 29, 2021		30.3	35.0	15.5	8.5	7.4	2.5	—N/a	±3.1 pp	1,000 (1/4)	telephone (rolling)	4.7
EKOS	January 27, 2021		30.9	34.3	15.0	5.7	7.7	3.7	2.7	±0.8 pp	8,575	IVR (rolling)	3.4
Angus Reid	January 24, 2021		30	35	20	6	5	1	3	±2.5 pp	1,559	online	5
Nanos Research	January 22, 2021		28.8	36.3	15.9	8.1	7.8	2.2	—N/a	±3.1 pp	1,000 (1/4)	telephone (rolling)	7.5
Mainstreet Research	January 20, 2021		31.9	39.3	14.4	5.2	5.2	2.4	1.6	±1.8 pp	3,132	IVR	7.4
Leger	January 17, 2021		29	36	21	7	6	—N/a	2	±2.53 pp	1,516	online	7
Nanos Research	January 15, 2021		27.4	38.7	15.7	8.0	7.5	2.0	—N/a	±3.1 pp	1,000 (1/4)	telephone (rolling)	11.3
Abacus Data	January 12, 2021		31	35	17	8	6	1	1	±2.2 pp	2,000	online	4
EKOS	January 12, 2021		31.3	34.5	15.0	—N/a	7.6	—N/a	—N/a	±1.36 pp	5,155	IVR	3.2
Nanos Research	January 8, 2021		27.3	40.2	16.5	6.7	7.4	1.2	—N/a	±3.1 pp	1,000 (1/4)	telephone (rolling)	12.9
Ipsos	January 6, 2021		29	36	19	6	8	—N/a	2	±3.5 pp	1,000	online	7
Leger	January 3, 2021		30	35	20	7	6	—N/a	2	±2.53 pp	1,506	online	5
Nanos Research	January 1, 2021		25.8	40.4	18.2	6.4	7.3	1.5	—N/a	±3.1 pp	1,000 (1/4)	telephone (rolling)	14.6
Nanos Research	December 25, 2020		26.8	39.9	18.0	6.5	6.9	1.4	—N/a	±3.1 pp	1,000 (1/4)	telephone (rolling)	13.1
Pollara	December 23, 2020		29	38	18	7	6	—N/a	—N/a	±2.8 pp	1,200	online	9
Abacus Data	December 18, 2020		32	35	17	7	7	—N/a	—N/a	±2.1 pp	2,200	online	3
Nanos Research	December 18, 2020		26.2	38.1	20.0	6.3	7.0	1.5	—N/a	±3.1 pp	1,000 (1/4)	telephone (rolling)	11.9
Mainstreet Research	December 17, 2020		33.2	37.9	13.1	4.9	6.7	2.3	1.9	±2.7 pp	1,286	IVR	4.7
Research Co.	December 14, 2020		31	37	20	7	3	1	1	±3.1 pp	1,000	online	6
Ipsos	December 14, 2020		32	35	18	7	7	—N/a	1	±3.5 pp	1,000	online	3
Leger	December 13, 2020		29	35	23	7	5	—N/a	2	±2.50 pp	1,528	online	6
Nanos Research	December 11, 2020		26.4	36.8	21.1	7.0	6.3	1.3	—N/a	±3.1 pp	1,000 (1/4)	telephone (rolling)	10.4
Nanos Research	December 4, 2020		26.6	36.0	20.0	7.0	7.9	1.1	—N/a	±3.1 pp	1,000 (1/4)	telephone (rolling)	9.4
Campaign Research	December 3, 2020		32	35	19	5	6	—N/a	—N/a	—N/a	1,956	online	3
EKOS	December 2, 2020		30.2	36.3	14.6	—N/a	8.8	—N/a	—N/a	±1.71 pp	3,269	IVR	6.1
Angus Reid	November 30, 2020		33	34	19	6	4	1	2	±1.4 pp	5,003	online	1
Leger	November 29, 2020		30	34	20	7	7	—N/a	2	±2.51 pp	1,516	online	4
Nanos Research	November 27, 2020		26.5	35.7	19.9	6.0	9.4	1.2	—N/a	±3.1 pp	1,000 (1/4)	telephone (rolling)	9.2
Mainstreet Research	November 26, 2020		31.7	39.0	12.3	5.1	6.7	3.3	1.9	±2.7 pp	1,341	IVR	7.3
EKOS	November 26, 2020		31.3	35.0	13.9	6.9	6.8	3.8	2.3	±1.4 pp	5,240	IVR	3.7
Delphi Polling	November 25, 2020		32	38	16	6	6	1	1	—N/a	1,000	online	6
Abacus Data	November 24, 2020		30	36	16	7	5	3	2	±1.85 pp	2,912	online	6
Ipsos	November 23, 2020		31	36	17	8	7	—N/a	1	±3.5 pp	1,001	online	5
Nanos Research	November 20, 2020		26.7	35.9	19.6	5.6	10.0	1.3	—N/a	±3.1 pp	1,000 (1/4)	telephone (rolling)	9.2
Leger	November 15, 2020		31	35	18	8	6	—N/a	2	±2.51 pp	1,522	online	4
Nanos Research	November 13, 2020		26.4	35.9	19.8	5.4	10.7	1.3	—N/a	±3.1 pp	1,000 (1/4)	telephone (rolling)	9.5
Abacus Data	November 12, 2020		30	38	15	8	6	2	2	±2.5 pp	1,664	online	8
Angus Reid	November 9, 2020		33	35	18	7	5	—N/a	2	±2.4 pp	1,602	online	2
Leger	November 8, 2020		28	36	21	7	5	—N/a	3	±2.50 pp	1,534	online	8
Nanos Research	November 6, 2020		28.9	37.6	18.5	4.9	8.5	1.0	—N/a	±3.1 pp	1,000 (1/4)	telephone (rolling)	8.7
Leger	November 1, 2020		31	34	21	7	6	—N/a	2	±2.52 pp	1,516	online	3
Nanos Research	October 30, 2020		27.9	39.5	16.9	5.6	8.2	1.1	—N/a	±3.1 pp	1,000 (1/4)	telephone (rolling)	11.6
Ipsos	October 26, 2020		32	38	17	6	7	—N/a	2	±3.5 pp	1,000	online	6
Leger	October 25, 2020		30	37	18	8	5	—N/a	2	±2.51 pp	1,523	online	7
Nanos Research	October 23, 2020		29.4	38.6	15.6	6.0	8.2	1.2	—N/a	±3.1 pp	1,000 (1/4)	telephone (rolling)	9.2
Mainstreet Research	October 21, 2020		34.0	35.8	15.0	5.4	5.0	3.4	1.4	±2.7 pp	1,328	IVR	1.8
EKOS	October 19, 2020	Twitter	31.4	35.2	13.7	5.7	8.7	4	2	±2.6 pp	1,416	IVR	3.8
Leger	October 18, 2020		29	36	18	8	6	—N/a	2	±2.52 pp	1,512	online	7
Nanos Research	October 16, 2020		32.5	38.5	13.4	6.0	7.6	1.4	—N/a	±3.1 pp	1,000 (1/4)	telephone (rolling)	6.0
Leger	October 11, 2020		29	37	21	7	6	—N/a	1	±2.50 pp	1,539	online	8
Nanos Research	October 9, 2020		33.2	35.3	14.9	6.5	7.9	1.2	—N/a	±3.1 pp	1,000 (1/4)	telephone (rolling)	2.1
Innovative Research	October 6, 2020		31	37	16	6	5	3	1	—N/a	2,771	online	6
Leger	October 4, 2020		32	36	20	7	4	—N/a	1	±2.51 pp	1,523	online	4
Nanos Research	October 2, 2020		33.5	34.1	16.6	6.6	6.8	1.8	—N/a	±3.1 pp	1,000 (1/4)	telephone (rolling)	0.6
	October 3, 2020	Annamie Paul is elected leader of the Green Party											
Ipsos	October 1, 2020		31	36	18	7	6	—N/a	1	±3.5 pp	1,000	online	5
Abacus Data	September 28, 2020		30	35	17	6	7	3	2	±2.0 pp	2,440	online	5
Leger	September 27, 2020		30	40	17	8	5	—N/a	1	±2.52 pp	1,514	online	10
Nanos Research	September 25, 2020		34.2	34.1	16.7	6.6	5.9	1.8	—N/a	±3.1 pp	1,000 (1/4)	telephone(rolling)	0.1
Mainstreet Research	September 24, 2020		34.6	37.1	15.2	4.8	4.6	2.2	1.6	±2.7 pp	1,307	IVR	2.5
Abacus Data	September 21, 2020		32	35	17	6	8	2	1	±2.6 pp	1,500	online	3
Leger	September 20, 2020		30	35	19	8	6	—N/a	2	±2.50 pp	1,538	online	5
Nanos Research	September 18, 2020		33.2	35.0	17.4	6.0	6.1	1.5	—N/a	±3.1 pp	1,000 (1/4)	telephone (rolling)	1.8
Campaign Research	September 15, 2020		30	40	15	6	7	—N/a	2	±2 pp	2,389	online	10
Innovative Research	September 15, 2020		29	39	17	6	7	2	1	—N/a	2,374	online	10
Ipsos	September 14, 2020		32	33	20	6	8	—N/a	1	±3.5 pp	1,000	online	1
Research Co.	September 13, 2020		32	38	17	8	3	1	1	±3.1 pp	1,000	online	6
Leger	September 13, 2020		31	35	18	7	6	—N/a	3	±2.50 pp	1,539	online	4
Nanos Research	September 11, 2020		30.1	35.8	19.1	6.8	6.0	1.5	—N/a	±3.1 pp	1,000 (1/4)	telephone (rolling)	5.7
Leger	September 6, 2020		32	34	19	7	6	—N/a	1	±2.51 pp	1,529	online	2
Nanos Research	September 4, 2020		31.1	33.2	19.2	7.8	7.6	0.9	—N/a	±3.1 pp	1,000 (1/4)	telephone (rolling)	2.1
Abacus Data	September 3, 2020		31	33	18	7	7	3	2	±2.1 pp	2,289	online	2
Angus Reid	September 1, 2020		35	35	17	7	4	1	1	±1.5 pp	5,005	online	0
Innovative Research	September 1, 2020		28	38	16	7	7	3	1	—N/a	2,308	online (rolling)	10
Leger	August 30, 2020		29	35	21	8	5	—N/a	2	±2.51 pp	1,521	online	6
Nanos Research	August 28, 2020		30.5	34.3	19.5	7.6	7.1	0.9	—N/a	±3.1 pp	1,000 (1/4)	telephone (rolling)	3.8
	August 24, 2020	Erin O'Toole is elected leader of the Conservative Party											
Leger	August 23, 2020		30	38	18	7	6	—N/a	2	±2.52 pp	1,516	online	8
Nanos Research	August 21, 2020		30.0	34.4	19.7	7.5	7.1	1.1	—N/a	±3.1 pp	1,000 (1/4)	telephone (rolling)	4.4
Abacus Data	August 19, 2020		30	36	18	6	5	4	2	±2.6 pp	1,500	online	6
Ipsos	August 18, 2020		32	35	18	7	7	—N/a	2	±2.5 pp	2,000	online	3
Innovative Research	August 18, 2020		28	40	16	7	6	3	1	—N/a	1,934	online	12
Leger	August 16, 2020		32	35	18	8	6	—N/a	2	±2.52 pp	1,510	online	3
Nanos Research	August 14, 2020		31.5	33.5	17.9	6.4	8.6	1.6	—N/a	±3.1 pp	1,000 (1/4)	telephone (rolling)	2.0
Campaign Research	August 13, 2020		33	30	18	7	8	—N/a	4	±2 pp	2,013	online	3
Mainstreet Research	August 12, 2020		28.9	41.3	15.6	5.5	5.2	2.1	1.5	±2.5 pp	1,594	IVR	12.4
Leger	August 9, 2020		29	36	15	8	8	—N/a	3	±2.52 pp	1,513	online	7
Nanos Research	August 7, 2020		30.1	36.1	17.6	6.4	7.4	2.0	—N/a	±3.1 pp	1,000 (1/4)	telephone (rolling)	6.0
Leger	August 2, 2020		31	33	20	8	6	—N/a	2	±2.5 pp	1,531	online	2
Nanos Research	July 31, 2020		29.7	34.3	17.4	6.8	8.3	2.8	—N/a	±3.1 pp	1,000 (1/4)	telephone (rolling)	4.6
Abacus Data	July 29, 2020		30	34	17	8	6	2	3	±2.6 pp	1,500	online	4
Leger	July 26, 2020		29	35	20	9	6	—N/a	1	±2.52 pp	1,517	online	6
Nanos Research	July 24, 2020		29.9	33.3	16.9	6.9	9.3	3.1	—N/a	±3.1 pp	1,000 (1/4)	telephone (rolling)	3.4
EKOS	July 22, 2020		30.0	34.7	15.2	6.5	7.6	3.5	2.5	±2.5 pp	1,505	IVR	4.7
Innovative Research	July 20, 2020		28	40	14	7	7	3	1	—N/a	2,599	online	12
Leger	July 19, 2020		28	39	17	7	7	—N/a	2	±2.51 pp	1,524	online	11
Nanos Research	July 17, 2020		28.9	34.9	16.9	7.1	8.8	2.8	—N/a	±3.1 pp	1,000 (1/4)	telephone (rolling)	6.0
EKOS	July 16, 2020		29.5	33.2	18.2	6.6	7.6	2.9	2.1	±3.7 pp	694	IVR	3.7
Abacus Data	July 16, 2020		31	36	16	7	7	2	1	±2.6 pp	1,500	online	5
Leger	July 12, 2020		26	38	19	8	7	—N/a	2	±2.51 pp	1,523	online	12
Nanos Research	July 10, 2020		28.9	35.9	15.6	6.7	9.3	2.7	—N/a	±3.1 pp	1,000 (1/4)	telephone (rolling)	7.0
Leger	July 5, 2020		25	39	20	8	5	—N/a	2	±2.52 pp	1,517	online	14
Nanos Research	July 3, 2020		27.8	36.3	16.4	6.1	10.1	2.5	—N/a	±3.1 pp	1,000 (1/4)	telephone (rolling)	8.5
Leger	June 28, 2020		28	40	17	7	6	—N/a	2	±2.51 pp	1,524	online	12
Mainstreet Research	June 26, 2020		27.4	43.2	14.1	5.7	4.8	2.9	1.8	±2.7 pp	1,283	IVR	15.8
Nanos Research	June 26, 2020		27.0	38.4	14.8	6.5	9.3	3.2	—N/a	±3.1 pp	1,000 (1/4)	telephone (rolling)	11.4
Innovative Research	June 23, 2020		27	41	15	6	8	—N/a	3	—N/a	2,115	online	14
Leger	June 21, 2020		28	39	19	7	5	—N/a	2	±2.51 pp	1,521	online	11
Abacus Data	June 21, 2020		29	40	16	7	6	2	1	±1.8 pp	2,979	online	11
Nanos Research	June 19, 2020		26.1	38.2	14.1	7.5	9.5	3.8	—N/a	±3.1 pp	1,000 (1/4)	telephone (rolling)	12.1
EKOS	June 16, 2020		29.9	40.5	12.7	5.1	6.5	3.5	1.8	±1.8 pp	3,006	IVR	10.6
Leger	June 14, 2020		27	40	16	7	7	—N/a	3	±2.51 pp	1,527	online	13
Nanos Research	June 12, 2020		25.7	36.8	16.3	7.0	9.3	4.4	—N/a	±3.1 pp	1,000 (1/4)	telephone (rolling)	11.1
Abacus Data	June 11, 2020	Twitter	29	39	19	6	5	—N/a	—N/a	—N/a	1,780	online	10
Leger	June 7, 2020		25	46	15	7	6	—N/a	1	±2.51 pp	1,523	online	21
Nanos Research	June 5, 2020		25.5	35.8	16.7	8.1	8.3	4.7	—N/a	±3.1 pp	1,000 (1/4)	telephone (rolling)	10.3
Innovative Research	June 1, 2020		28	42	12	7	7	—N/a	4	—N/a	2,246	online	14
Leger	May 31, 2020		27	40	18	7	7	—N/a	2	±2.50 pp	1,536	online	13
Abacus Data	May 29, 2020	Twitter	29	39	15	7	7	—N/a	—N/a	—N/a	1,800	online	10
Leger	May 25, 2020		27	41	15	7	6	—N/a	2	±2.52 pp	1,510	online	14
Angus Reid	May 24, 2020		31	37	17	7	5	—N/a	3	±1.4 pp	5,001	online	6
Nanos Research	May 22, 2020		26.2	35.3	19.3	6.6	7.5	4.6	—N/a	±3.1 pp	1,000 (1/4)	telephone (rolling)	9.1
Leger	May 17, 2020		25	44	15	7	7	—N/a	2	±2.52 pp	1,513	online	19
Abacus Data	May 17, 2020		31	39	16	7	6	—N/a	—N/a	±2.3 pp	1,800	online	8
Nanos Research	May 15, 2020		26.3	36.7	18.4	6.7	7.2	4.1	—N/a	±3.1 pp	1,000 (1/4)	telephone (rolling)	10.4
Leger	May 10, 2020		28	41	17	7	6	—N/a	1	±2.51 pp	1,526	online	13
Nanos Research	May 8, 2020		26.1	36.9	19.2	6.1	8.0	3.2	—N/a	±3.1 pp	1,000 (1/4)	telephone (rolling)	10.8
Mainstreet Research	May 7, 2020		29.4	43.3	11.5	5.8	5.9	3.0	1.1	±2.6 pp	1,404	IVR	13.9
EKOS	May 7, 2020		28.3	42.7	10.6	6.7	6.7	3.3	1.7	±1.4 pp	5,276	IVR	14.4
Innovative Research	May 5, 2020		28	41	13	6	7	—N/a	3	—N/a	2,699	online	13
Research Co.	May 3, 2020		30	39	17	5	7	1	1	±3.1 pp	1,000	online	9
Leger	May 3, 2020		25	44	15	7	6	—N/a	2	±2.51 pp	1,526	online	19
Nanos Research	May 1, 2020		25.8	36.9	19.0	5.8	8.4	3.6	—N/a	±3.1 pp	1,000 (1/4)	telephone (rolling)	11.1
Leger	April 26, 2020		28	43	14	7	6	—N/a	2	±2.51 pp	1,515	online	15
Abacus Data	April 24, 2020	Twitter	30	38	16	8	6	—N/a	—N/a	—N/a	2,481	online	8
Nanos Research	April 24, 2020		26.2	38.2	17.0	6.9	8.0	3.4	—N/a	±3.1 pp	1,000 (1/4)	telephone (rolling)	12.0
Leger	April 19, 2020		29	42	14	8	5	—N/a	2	±2.53 pp	1,504	online	13
Angus Reid	April 17, 2020		33	36	17	8	4	—N/a	3	±2.2 pp	1,912	online	3
Nanos Research	April 17, 2020		26.4	38.3	17.4	7.2	7.0	2.8	—N/a	±3.1 pp	1,000 (1/4)	telephone (rolling)	11.9
Leger	April 12, 2020		28	39	18	6	8	—N/a	2	±2.52 pp	1,508	online	11
Nanos Research	April 10, 2020		28.4	38.1	15.7	8.1	6.7	2.0	—N/a	±3.1 pp	1,000 (1/4)	telephone (rolling)	9.7
Nanos Research	April 3, 2020		29.1	38.9	14.8	8.4	6.5	1.1	—N/a	±3.1 pp	1,000 (1/4)	telephone (rolling)	9.8
Innovative Research	April 2, 2020	(Note: Percent voting intentions given in the report have been adjusted to reflect only decided/leaning voters for consistency among poll results in the table.)	27	40	15	8	7	2	1	—N/a	2,059	online	13
Nanos Research	March 27, 2020		30.9	36.1	16.6	7.0	7.0	0.8	—N/a	±3.1 pp	1,000 (1/4)	telephone (rolling)	5.2
EKOS	March 26, 2020		28.6	40.4	12.2	8.6	5.9	2.2	2.1	±2.0 pp	2,304	IVR	11.8
Nanos Research	March 20, 2020		32.5	34.8	17.4	6.0	7.0	1.3	—N/a	±3.1 pp	1,000 (1/4)	telephone (rolling)	2.3
Mainstreet Research	March 17, 2020		32.2	38.6	11.1	8.8	5.7	1.7	1.9	±2.4 pp	1,665	IVR	6.4
Nanos Research	March 13, 2020		29.5	37.0	17.6	5.9	7.4	1.8	—N/a	±3.1 pp	1,000 (1/4)	telephone (rolling)	7.5
Nanos Research	March 6, 2020		32.4	34.8	17.1	5.8	7.4	1.8	—N/a	±3.1 pp	1,000 (1/4)	telephone (rolling)	2.4
Leger	March 2, 2020		30	32	20	8	8	—N/a	2	±2.50 pp	1,540	online	2
Angus Reid	February 28, 2020		34	26	21	9	7	—N/a	3	±1.4 pp	5,043	online	8
Nanos Research	February 28, 2020		35.1	35.3	15.0	5.9	6.5	1.6	—N/a	±3.1 pp	1,000 (1/4)	telephone (rolling)	0.2
Campaign Research	February 26, 2020		30	30	19	8	11	—N/a	3	±2.5 pp	1,606	online	0
Nanos Research	February 21, 2020		36.2	33.0	15.4	6.8	6.6	1.4	—N/a	±3.1 pp	1,000 (1/4)	telephone (rolling)	3.2
Nanos Research	February 14, 2020		36.1	32.7	15.5	7.1	7.0	1.1	—N/a	±3.1 pp	1,000 (1/4)	telephone (rolling)	3.4
Nanos Research	February 7, 2020		35.5	33.4	13.7	7.8	8.0	1.0	—N/a	±3.1 pp	1,000 (1/4)	telephone (rolling)	2.1
Nanos Research	January 31, 2020		33.1	33.2	16.4	7.7	7.9	1.1	—N/a	±3.1 pp	1,000 (1/4)	telephone (rolling)	0.1
Leger	January 30, 2020		32	34	19	7	7	—N/a	1	±2.53 pp	1,501	online	2
Nanos Research	January 24, 2020		31.0	33.8	16.7	8.3	8.9	0.9	—N/a	±3.1 pp	1,000 (1/4)	telephone (rolling)	2.8
Leger	January 21, 2020		32	31	19	8	8	—N/a	2	±2.49 pp	1,552	online	1
Abacus Data	January 17, 2020		30	34	17	6	8	3	2	±2.5 pp	1,500	online	4
Mainstreet Research	January 17, 2020		32.4	39.8	10.6	6.6	5.4	2.8	2.4	±2.55 pp	1,470	IVR	7.4
Nanos Research	January 17, 2020		30.8	34.1	16.4	8.1	8.6	1.2	—N/a	±3.1 pp	1,000 (1/4)	telephone (rolling)	3.3
Nanos Research	January 10, 2020		31.5	32.2	17.8	8.1	8.1	1.7	—N/a	±3.1 pp	1,000 (1/4)	telephone (rolling)	0.7
Leger	January 7, 2020		31	34	18	7	8	—N/a	2	±2.49 pp	1,554	online	3
Nanos Research	January 3, 2020		31.3	33.7	17.0	7.1	8.8	1.4	—N/a	±3.1 pp	1,000 (1/4)	telephone (rolling)	2.4
Nanos Research	December 27, 2019		31.4	34.7	16.4	6.3	8.8	1.7	—N/a	±3.1 pp	1,000 (1/4)	telephone (rolling)	3.3
Nanos Research	December 20, 2019		29.6	34.7	17.7	6.0	9.8	1.4	—N/a	±3.1 pp	1,000 (1/4)	telephone (rolling)	5.1
Abacus Data	December 16, 2019		30	33	18	7	8	2	2	±2.1 pp	1,500	online	3
Angus Reid	December 15, 2019		33	30	19	8	7	—N/a	3	±2.0 pp	2,011	online	3
Nanos Research	December 13, 2019		30.5	33.8	18.7	5.0	10.2	0.9	—N/a	±3.1 pp	1,000 (1/4)	telephone (rolling)	3.3
	December 12, 2019	Andrew Scheer announces his intention to resign as the leader of the Conservative Party											
EKOS	December 10, 2019		29.6	31.1	16.8	5.8	9.8	4.2	2.7	±2.0 pp	2,339	IVR	1.5
Nanos Research	December 6, 2019		31.0	33.6	17.5	6.7	9.8	0.6	—N/a	±3.1 pp	1,000 (1/4)	telephone (rolling)	2.6
Nanos Research	November 29, 2019		31.3	34.1	17.1	6.4	9.5	0.8	—N/a	±3.1 pp	1,000 (1/4)	telephone (rolling)	2.8
Leger	November 25, 2019		30	32	19	7	7	3	1	±1.78 pp	3,040	online	2
Nanos Research	November 22, 2019		30.9	33.7	17.2	6.8	9.3	1.4	—N/a	±3.1 pp	1,000 (1/4)	telephone (rolling)	2.8
Nanos Research	November 15, 2019		30.8	32.8	19.0	7.6	7.3	1.9	—N/a	±3.1 pp	1,000 (1/4)	telephone (rolling)	2.0
Nanos Research	November 8, 2019		31.3	31.8	19.9	6.9	7.6	2.1	—N/a	±3.1 pp	1,000 (1/4)	telephone (rolling)	0.5
	November 4, 2019	Jo-Ann Roberts is named interim leader of the Green Party											
Nanos Research	November 1, 2019		32.5	31.1	19.0	6.7	8.5	1.8	—N/a	±3.1 pp	1,000 (1/4)	telephone (rolling)	1.4
Nanos Research	October 25, 2019		32.5	31.7	20.8	7.2	6.0	1.5	—N/a	±3.1 pp	1,000	telephone (rolling)	0.8
2019 election (Note: Party columns are ordered from largest to smallest share of the popular vote in the 2019 election, not according to the number of seats won.)	October 21, 2019	HTML	34.3	33.1	16.0	7.6	6.5	1.6	0.9	—N/a	18,170,880	—N/a	1.2
Polling firm	Last date of polling	Link							Others	Margin of error	Sample size	Polling method	Lead
Polling firm	Last date of polling	Link	CPC	LPC	NDP	BQ	GPC	PPC	Others	Margin of error	Sample size	Polling method	Lead

== Regional polls ==
A number of polling firms survey federal voting intentions on a regional or provincial level:

=== Atlantic Canada ===
Polling firm	Last date of polling	Link	LPC	CPC	NDP	GPC	PPC	Others	Margin of error	Sample size	Polling method	Lead
Narrative Research	May 17, 2020		60	21	10	7	1	—N/a	±2.5 pp	1,500	telephone	39

==== New Brunswick ====
Polling firm	Last date of polling	Link	LPC	CPC	NDP	GPC	PPC	Other	Margin of error	Sample size	Polling method	Lead
Narrative Research	August 20, 2021		44	24	18	10	4	—N/a	±5.6 pp	308	telephone	20

==== Newfoundland and Labrador ====
Polling firm	Last date of polling	Link	LPC	CPC	NDP	GPC	PPC	Others	Margin of error	Sample size	Polling method	Lead
Narrative Research	August 29, 2021		52	25	24	<1	1	—N/a	±5.4 pp	333	telephone	27

==== Nova Scotia ====
Polling firm	Last date of polling	Link	LPC	CPC	NDP	GPC	PPC	Other	Margin of error	Sample size	Polling method	Lead
Narrative Research	August 22, 2021		33	36	28	1	1	—N/a	±5.3 pp	341	telephone	3

==== Prince Edward Island ====
Polling firm	Last date of polling	Link	LPC	CPC	NDP	GPC	PPC	Others	Margin of error	Sample size	Polling method	Lead
Narrative Research	August 25, 2021		39	35	13	12	1	—N/a	±6.2 pp	247	telephone	4
MQO Research	March 10, 2020		38	41	9	11	0	—N/a	±4.9 pp	400	telephone	3

=== Central Canada ===
==== Quebec ====
Polling firm	Last date of polling	Link	LPC	CPC	NDP	BQ	GPC	PPC	Others	Margin of error	Sample size	Polling method	Lead
Leger	September 1, 2021		33	20	13	28	3	2	1	±1.8 pp	3,102	online	5
Leger	December 13, 2020		33	21	11	30	4	—N/a	1	±3.1 pp	1,004	online	3
Leger	September 3, 2020		30	20	14	30	5	—N/a	1	±3.1 pp	1,000	online	0

==== Ontario ====
Polling firm	Last date of polling	Link	LPC	CPC	NDP	GPC	PPC	Others	Margin of error	Sample size	Polling method	Lead
Campaign Research	September 9, 2021		37	33	22	4	3	—N/a	±2 pp	1,565	online	4
Pollara	November 16, 2020		46	28	18	6	2	1	±2.1 pp	2,129	online	18

===== Greater Toronto Area =====
Polling firm	Last date of polling	Link	LPC	CPC	NDP	GPC	PPC	Others	Margin of error	Sample size	Polling method	Lead
Forum Research	September 10, 2021	PDF	39	33	15	3	10	1	±4 pp	493	IVR	6
Nanos Research	August 29, 2021		44	33	17	4	4	—N/a	±4.4 pp	502	telephone	11
Mainstreet Research	August 21, 2021		43	29	20	5	3	—N/a	±4.2 pp	532	telephone	14
Forum Research	August 15, 2021	PDF	36	35	17	3	6	2	±4 pp	502	IVR	1

=== Western Canada ===
==== Manitoba ====
Polling firm	Last date of polling	Link	LPC	CPC	NDP	GPC	PPC	Others	Margin of error	Sample size	Polling method	Lead
Leger	September 8, 2021		30	38	22	3	4	–	±4.0 pp	600	online	8
Probe Research	June 11, 2021		29	32	28	7	4	–	±3.1 pp	1,000	online/phone/IVR	3
Probe Research	March 26, 2021		29	37	25	6	4	–	±3.1 pp	1,000	online/phone/IVR	8
Probe Research	December 4, 2020		32	37	24	5	–	–	±3.1 pp	1,000	online/phone/IVR	5
Probe Research	September 17, 2020		33	40	21	5	–	–	±3.1 pp	1,000	online/phone/IVR	7
Probe Research	June 11, 2020		36	33	22	5	–	–	±3.1 pp	1,000	online/phone/IVR	1

==== Alberta ====
Polling firm	Last date of polling	Link	LPC	CPC	NDP	GPC	PPC	Others	Margin of error	Sample size	Polling method	Lead
Janet Brown	April 10, 2021		24	53	17	2	2	0	±2.8 pp	1,200	Online/phone	29

==== British Columbia ====
Polling firm	Last date of polling	Link	LPC	CPC	NDP	GPC	PPC	Others	Margin of error	Sample size	Polling method	Lead
Insights West	September 16, 2021		22	34	33	7	4	–	±2.8 pp	1,201	online	1
Leger	September 12, 2021		30	31	29	–	–	–	±3.1 pp	861	online	1
Insights West	September 4, 2021		19	33	35	8	–	5	±3.1 pp	1,003	online	2
Leger	August 22, 2021		27	25	25	5	–	–	±3.1 pp	1,002	online	2
Research Co.	August 9, 2021		37	23	29	9	2	–	±3.5 pp	800	online	8

== Leadership polls ==
Aside from conducting the usual opinion surveys on general party preferences, polling firms also survey public opinion on which political party leader would make the best prime minister:

=== September 2020 – September 2021 ===
Polling firm	Last date of polling	Link	Justin Trudeau	Erin O'Toole	Jagmeet Singh	Yves-François Blanchet	Annamie Paul	Maxime Bernier	Unsure	Margin of error	Lead
Research Co.	September 13, 2021		34	26	18	–	5	2	–	±3.1 pp	7
Leger	September 13, 2021		25	20	22	–	2	4	15	±2.4 pp	3
Nanos Research	September 11, 2021		34.0	26.2	17.7	3.2	2.0	4.7	12.2	±2.8 pp	7.8
Nanos Research	September 8, 2021		28.1	27.5	21.2	3.2	1.7	6.2	12.1	±2.8 pp	0.6
Nanos Research	September 7, 2021		29.9	26.3	21.1	2.9	1.9	4.8	13.0	±2.8 pp	3.6
Nanos Research	September 2, 2021		27.3	31.1	19.6	2.6	2.2	4.4	12.8	±3.1 pp	3.8
Leger	August 30, 2021		23	21	23	–	1	3	15	±2.4 pp	0
Innovative Research	August 30, 2021		34	28	26	4	3	5		—N/a	6
Nanos Research	August 28, 2021		29.7	27.6	19.5	2.3	2.2	4.1	14.5	±3.1 pp	2.1
Nanos Research	August 21, 2021		32.6	26.3	17.9	3.2	2.0	3.6	14.4	±3.1 pp	6.3
Leger	August 16, 2021		27	15	18	–	1	3	17	±2.4 pp	9
Nanos Research	August 13, 2021		35.6	17.9	16.9	4.3	2.6	2.9	20.1	±3.1 pp	17.7
Leger	August 12, 2021		25	15	18	–	2	4	19	±2.4 pp	7
Leger	August 1, 2021		27	11	19	–	1	3	19	±2.52 pp	8
Nanos Research	July 23, 2021		38.9	15.7	17.6	3.5	1.0	3.5	19.9	±3.1 pp	21.3
Nanos Research	July 9, 2021		37.4	14.3	17.6	2.7	1.4	3.0	23.6	±3.1 pp	19.8
Leger	July 4, 2021		22	16	17	–	1	4	20	±2.52 pp	5
Nanos Research	July 2, 2021		35.1	15.7	16.7	3.4	1.7	2.8	24.6	±3.1 pp	18.4
Nanos Research	June 25, 2021		33.3	17.4	15.7	3.7	2.4	3.5	24.1	±3.1 pp	15.9
Ipsos	June 22, 2021		42	23	23	6	5	—N/a	—N/a	±2.9 pp	19
Nanos Research	June 11, 2021		35.1	19.9	13.8	4.2	4.2	4.7	18.1	±3.1 pp	15.2
Nanos Research	May 14, 2021		36.3	20.8	12.6	5.2	5.3	5.2	14.6	±3.1 pp	15.5
Innovative Research	May 5, 2021		44	20	23	2	4	6		—N/a	21
Ipsos	April 9, 2021		42	25	17	8	7	—N/a		±3.5 pp	17
Nanos Research	April 2, 2021		40.1	18.9	13.2	2.3	4.1	2.9	18.5	±3.1 pp	21.2
Nanos Research	March 26, 2021		38.9	19.3	13.7	2.2	4.7	3.2	18.0	±3.1 pp	19.6
Research Co.	March 15, 2021		40	15	12	3	2	2	25	±3.1 pp	25
Nanos Research	March 12, 2021		36.7	22.0	14.4	3.7	5.6	3.4	14.2	±3.1 pp	14.7
Nanos Research	February 26, 2021		34.0	24.5	15.2	4.2	4.6	4.1	14.2	±3.1 pp	9.5
Nanos Research	February 5, 2021		38.1	24.7	13.5	5.4	4.6	4.1	9.6	±3.1 pp	13.4
Nanos Research	January 15, 2021		38.5	23.9	13.3	4.6	4.2	3.2	12.3	±3.1 pp	14.6
Nanos Research	January 1, 2021		39.3	20.3	13.1	3.2	3.9	2.4	17.7	±3.1 pp	19.0
Nanos Research	December 18, 2020		38.2	21.1	13.2	3.6	2.2	2.2	19.6	±3.1 pp	17.1
Research Co.	December 14, 2020		39	22	13	3	2	2		±3.1 pp	17
Nanos Research	December 11, 2020		37.5	19.7	13.5	3.9	3.2	2.3	19.9	±3.1 pp	17.8
Nanos Research	November 20, 2020		38.5	20.3	14.5	3.4	1.8	2.0	19.5	±3.1 pp	18.2
Nanos Research	October 30, 2020		39.0	20.1	12.7	2.8	2.5	1.9	21.0	±3.1 pp	18.9
Nanos Research	October 23, 2020		37.7	21.6	12.6	2.9	2.7	2.1	20.5	±3.1 pp	16.1
Nanos Research	October 16, 2020		38.5	23.0	11.1	1.9	2.9	2.5	20.1	±3.1 pp	15.0
Nanos Research	October 9, 2020		37.1	22.5	11.6	2.8	4.0	2.1	19.7	±3.1 pp	14.6
Nanos Research	September 25, 2020		35.6	22.8	13.2	3.1	3.3	2.1	19.9	±3.1 pp	12.8
Nanos Research	September 4, 2020		34.4	20.2	15.2	4.2	4.0	1.5	20.5	±3.1 pp	14.2

=== October 2019 – August 2020 ===
Polling firm	Last date of polling	Link	Justin Trudeau	Andrew Scheer	Jagmeet Singh	Yves-François Blanchet	Elizabeth May	Maxime Bernier	Unsure	Margin of error	Lead
Nanos Research	August 21, 2020		33.9	18.6	14.3	4.7	5.4	1.8	21.4	±3.1 pp	15.3
Innovative Research	August 18, 2020		47	21	22	–	6	5		—N/a	26
Nanos Research	August 7, 2020		32.6	20.7	12.5	5.2	6.7	3.1	19.2	±3.1 pp	11.9
Nanos Research	July 17, 2020		35.6	19.7	14.9	6.7	6.4	4.1	12.7	±3.1 pp	15.9
Nanos Research	June 26, 2020		40.2	18.0	13.7	4.7	7.4	2.7	13.2	±3.1 pp	22.2
Nanos Research	June 12, 2020		39.1	16.9	14.4	5.2	7.3	3.7	13.3	±3.1 pp	22.2
Nanos Research	May 29, 2020		38.8	15.5	14.4	6.1	5.8	4.8	13.2	±3.1 pp	23.3
Nanos Research	May 15, 2020		37.5	17.2	14.5	7.0	6.2	4.2	13.2	±3.1 pp	20.3
Nanos Research	May 8, 2020		38.0	17.0	14.3	7.0	7.5	4.0	12.0	±3.1 pp	21.0
Nanos Research	May 1, 2020		37.1	17.8	15.5	6.7	7.6	3.9	11.5	±3.1 pp	19.3
Nanos Research	April 24, 2020		38.0	17.3	15.7	6.6	7.0	4.3	11.2	±3.1 pp	20.7
Nanos Research	April 17, 2020		37.4	16.3	15.5	6.2	6.2	3.7	14.8	±3.1 pp	21.1
Nanos Research	April 10, 2020		37.6	17.1	15.2	5.7	4.8	1.1	16.5	±3.1 pp	20.5
Nanos Research	April 3, 2020		35.4	17.8	14.1	5.4	5.4	2.1	19.8	±3.1 pp	17.6
Nanos Research	March 27, 2020		31.9	19.7	13.2	4.3	5.8	1.8	23.3	±3.1 pp	12.2
Nanos Research	March 20, 2020		30.7	21.4	12.8	3.8	6.2	2.2	22.9	±3.1 pp	9.3
Nanos Research	March 13, 2020		32.3	19.2	12.2	3.8	6.9	2.5	23.1	±3.1 pp	13.1
Nanos Research	March 6, 2020		32.6	20.6	12.3	3.8	6.1	2.1	22.6	±3.1 pp	12.0
Nanos Research	February 28, 2020		31.9	19.7	13.2	4.3	5.8	1.1	23.3	±3.1 pp	12.2
Nanos Research	February 14, 2020		34.0	21.0	12.4	3.4	5.3	1.5	22.3	±3.1 pp	13.0
Nanos Research	February 7, 2020		34.5	20.6	12.9	4.2	4.9	1.8	21.2	±3.1 pp	13.9
Nanos Research	January 31, 2020		33.3	20.1	13.2	5.1	5.1	2.2	21.0	±3.1 pp	13.2
Nanos Research	January 24, 2020		33.3	19.8	13.4	4.8	6.1	1.9	20.6	±3.1 pp	13.5
Nanos Research	January 17, 2020		32.8	19.6	13.0	4.9	6.2	2.5	21.1	±3.1 pp	13.2
Nanos Research	January 10, 2020		31.0	20.9	14.4	4.2	6.8	2.0	20.7	±3.1 pp	10.1
Nanos Research	January 3, 2020		32.2	21.1	15.1	3.3	6.4	1.7	20.1	±3.1 pp	11.1
Nanos Research	December 27, 2019		34.4	21.1	14.4	3.1	5.3	2.2	19.4	±3.1 pp	13.3
Nanos Research	December 20, 2019		36.0	21.0	15.9	2.8	6.4	1.7	16.2	±3.1 pp	15.0
Nanos Research	December 13, 2019		35.8	21.9	16.1	2.6	7.0	1.5	15.3	±3.1 pp	13.9
Nanos Research	December 6, 2019		36.6	22.0	15.4	3.1	7.0	1.4	14.6	±3.1 pp	14.6
Nanos Research	November 29, 2019		38.2	21.5	15.1	2.7	7.4	1.1	14.0	±3.1 pp	16.7
Nanos Research	November 22, 2019		35.1	22.0	15.4	3.1	7.0	2.1	15.3	±3.1 pp	13.1
Nanos Research	November 15, 2019		32.3	23.9	17.8	3.9	5.8	1.8	13.5	±3.1 pp	8.4
Nanos Research	November 8, 2019		31.1	24.9	19.0	3.4	6.2	2.0	13.5	±3.1 pp	6.2
Nanos Research	November 1, 2019		30.0	27.0	17.3	3.4	7.2	1.6	13.6	±3.1 pp	3.0

== See also ==
- Opinion polling for the 2021 Canadian federal election by constituency
- Opinion polling for the 2019 Canadian federal election
- Opinion polling for the 2015 Canadian federal election
- Opinion polling for the 2011 Canadian federal election
- Opinion polling for the 2008 Canadian federal election
- Opinion polling for the 2006 Canadian federal election
