= Opinion polling for the 2006 Canadian federal election =

Opinion polling in the Canadian federal election of 2006 (held on 23 January 2006) showed a long period of variable support for the governing Liberal Party of Canada and opposition Conservative Party of Canada. Prior to and throughout much of the campaign, the Liberals held a small lead over the Conservatives; as of early January 2006, the Conservatives had taken the lead. This was confirmed on election day when the Conservatives won a plurality of votes and seats, being empowered to form a minority government in the 39th Canadian parliament.

== Summary ==
In the leadup to the 2006 federal election, several opinion polls were commissioned to gauge the voting intentions of Canadians, particularly in the wake of Jean Brault's testimony at the Gomery Commission on 7 April 2005. The results of these polls showed a dip in support for the Liberals, which encouraged the Conservatives to seek an early election by tabling a non-confidence motion. However, Liberal support recovered following an agreement with the New Democratic Party (NDP) to support some changes to the federal budget and a number of incidents involving Conservative Member of Parliament (MP) Gurmant Grewal that hurt the Conservatives. Consistently since the Brault testimony, the polls have indicated that an election would result in an increase in the number of seats for the Bloc Québécois and NDP, and cyclical gains and losses for the Conservatives inversely to the Liberals.

In November 2005, the first report by Justice John Gomery was released to the public; subsequently, the poll numbers for the Liberals again dropped. Just days later, a new poll (Strategic Counsel: 6 November 2005) showed the Liberals were already bouncing back. On 28 November 2005, the minority Liberal government succumbed to another Conservative non-confidence motion supported by the three opposition parties and the writs for an election were dropped. The Conservatives achieved near parity but, early in the campaign, again fell back behind the Liberals. Renewed accusations of corruption and impropriety at the end of 2005 – amid Royal Canadian Mounted Police (RCMP) criminal probes concerning possible government leaks regarding income trust tax changes and advertising sponsorships – led to an upswing of Conservative support again and gave them a lead over the Liberals, portending a possible change in government.

Polling figures for the NDP increased slightly, while Bloc figures experienced a slight dip; figures for the Green Party did not change appreciably throughout the campaign.

== Poll results ==

The dates listed are normally the date the survey was concluded. Most news and political affairs sources use the convention of using the last date that the poll was conducted in order to establish the inclusion/exclusion of current events.

Polling firm	Last date of polling	Link	LPC	CPC	NDP	BQ	GPC	Margin of error	Sample size	Polling method	Lead
Election	23 January 2006		30.2	36.3	17.5	10.5	4.5	N/A	14,817,159		6.1
Strategic Counsel	22 January 2006	PDF	27	37	19	11	6	± 2%	2,500		10
Nanos Research	22 January 2006	PDF	30.1	36.4	17.4	10.6	5.6	± 3.1%	1,200 (1/3)	Telephone (rolling)	6.3
Ipsos-Reid	22 January 2006	HTML	27	38	19	12	4	± 1.1%	9,648		11
Nanos Research	21 January 2006	PDF	28.1	37.0	17.7	11.3	6.0	± 3.1%	1,200 (1/3)	Telephone (rolling)	8.9
Strategic Counsel	21 January 2006	PDF	27	37	18	11	6	± 2.2%	2,000		10
Nanos Research	20 January 2006	PDF	29.4	36.2	17.3	11.0	6.1	± 3.1%	1,200 (1/3)	Telephone (rolling)	6.8
EKOS	20 January 2006	PDF	26.9	37.1	19.5	11.5	4.6				10.2
EKOS	20 January 2006	PDF	24.4	38.4	19.8	11.9	5.4				14
Ipsos-Reid	19 January 2006	PDF	26	38	19	11	5				12
EKOS	19 January 2006	PDF	27.0	37.1	19.7	11.2	4.5				10.1
Strategic Counsel	19 January 2006	PDF	28	38	17	11	7				10
Nanos Research	19 January 2006	PDF	29.0	35.5	18.8	11.1	5.6	± 2.9%	1,200 (1/3)	Telephone (rolling)	6.5
EKOS^{[3]}	19 January 2006	PDF	27.3	37.4	20.8	10.1	3.9				9.9
Strategic Counsel	18 January 2006	PDF	28	37	16	12	7				9
Nanos Research	18 January 2006	PDF	30.7	37.0	16.6	10.7	4.9				6.3
EKOS^{[3]}	18 January 2006	PDF	29.3	35.1	18.0	12.6	4.4				5.8
Leger Marketing	17 January 2006	PDF	29	38	17	11	—				9
Strategic Counsel	17 January 2006	PDF	25	41	17	12	5				16
Nanos Research	17 January 2006	PDF	31.5	36.9	17.6	10.0	4.0				5.4
EKOS	17 January 2006	PDF	27.2	36.9	19.6	11.0	4.8				9.7
Strategic Counsel	16 January 2006	PDF	24	42	17	12	5				18
Nanos Research	16 January 2006	PDF	30	37	18	10	4				7
EKOS^{[3]}	16 January 2006	PDF	29.6	35.8	19.4	11.6	3.4				6.2
Decima Research	15 January 2006	PDF	27	37	18	11	—	± 3.1%	1017	telephone	10
Ipsos-Reid	15 January 2006	PDF	26	38	19	12	5				12
Strategic Counsel	15 January 2006	PDF	27	40	16	11	6				13
Nanos Research	15 January 2006	PDF	29	37	18	11	5				8
EKOS	15 January 2006	PDF	27.2	38.6	18.6	10.6	4.4	± 3.2	968	Telephone	11.4
Nanos Research	14 January 2006	PDF	30	38	17	10	6				8
Strategic Counsel	14 January 2006	PDF	27	40	16	11	6				13
Nanos Research	13 January 2006	PDF	29	38	16	11	7				9
Strategic Counsel	12 January 2006	PDF	28	38	16	11	6				10
Ipsos-Reid	12 January 2006	HTML	29	37	18	10	5				8
Nanos Research	12 January 2006	PDF	31	40	14	10	6	± 3.1	1,200 (1/3)	Telephone (rolling)	9
EKOS	12 January 2006	PDF	28.3	37.6	18.1	11.6	3.7	± 2.0	2,045		9.3
EKOS^{[3]}	12 January 2006	PDF	27.4	38.1	18.1	11.5	4.5				10.7
Strategic Counsel	11 January 2006	PDF	27	39	16	12	6				12
Nanos Research	11 January 2006	PDF	29	38	16	12	5	± 3.1	1,200 (1/3)	Telephone (rolling)	9
EKOS^{[3]}	11 January 2006	PDF	28.8	36.3	17.9	13.3	2.8				7.5
Strategic Counsel	10 January 2006	PDF	28	39	16	12		1,500			11
Nanos Research	10 January 2006	PDF	30	39	16	12	4	± 3.1	1,200 (1/3)	Telephone (rolling)	9
EKOS^{[3]}	10 January 2006	PDF	29.9	37.1	17.6	11.6	3.2				7.2
Strategic Counsel	9 January 2006	PDF	28	38	16	12	6				10
Nanos Research	9 January 2006	PDF	31	35	17	13	5	± 3.1	1,200 (1/3)	Telephone (rolling)	4
EKOS	9 January 2006	PDF	26.8	39.1	16.2	12.6	5.4				12.3
Ipsos-Reid	8 January 2006	PDF	26	37	18	13	5				11
Decima Research	8 January 2006	PDF	27	36	20	11	5				9
Nanos Research	8 January 2006	PDF	31	34	17	11	6	± 3.1	1,200 (1/3)	Telephone (rolling)	3
Strategic Counsel	8 January 2006	PDF	29	37	15	13	6	± 2.5	1,500		8
Nanos Research	7 January 2006	PDF	32	34	17	11	6	± 3.1	1,200 (1/3)	Telephone (rolling)	2
Nanos Research	6 January 2006	PDF	32	35	17	10	6	± 3.1	1,200 (1/3)	Telephone (rolling)	3
Ipsos-Reid	5 January 2006	PDF	31	35	18	10	5	± 2.2	2,004		4
EKOS	5 January 2006	PDF	30.8	36.0	17.5	10.6	4.7	± 2.2	1,968		5.2
Strategic Counsel	5 January 2006	PDF	31	33	17	13	6				2
Nanos Research	5 January 2006	PDF	33	34	17	11	5	± 3.2	1,200 (1/3)	Telephone (rolling)	1
Leger Marketing	4 January 2006	PDF	32	34	16	11	5				2
Strategic Counsel	4 January 2006	PDF	32	32	17	13	6				0
Nanos Research	4 January 2006	PDF	33	35	15	12	5	± 3.2	1,200 (1/3)	Telephone (rolling)	2
EKOS	4 January 2006	PDF	30.4	36.2	17.9	10.4	4.7	± 2.7	1,386		5.8
Strategic Counsel	3 January 2006	HTML	32	32	17	13	6	± 2.5	1,500		0
Nanos Research	3 January 2006	PDF	33	36	15	13	4	± 3.1	1,200 (1/3)	Telephone (rolling)	3
Strategic Counsel	31 December 2005	PDF	33	31	17	14	6				2
Nanos Research	30 December 2005	PDF	35	35	14	13	4	± 3.1	1,200 (1/3)	Telephone (rolling)	0
Ipsos-Reid	30 December 2005	PDF	32	33	18	12	5	± 3.1	1,000	Telephone	1
Decima Research	30 December 2005	PDF	32	30	18	14					2
Nanos Research	29 December 2005	PDF	35	34	14	13	5	± 3.1	1,200 (1/3)	Telephone (rolling)	1
Nanos Research	28 December 2005	PDF	38	32	14	13	4	± 3.1	1,200 (1/3)	Telephone (rolling)	6
Nanos Research	23 December 2005	PDF	38	31	15	12	5	± 3.1	1,200 (1/3)	Telephone (rolling)	7
Ipsos-Reid	22 December 2005	PDF	33	32	16	13	5	± 3.1	1,000	Telephone	1
Strategic Counsel	22 December 2005	PDF	36	29	17	13	5				7
Nanos Research	22 December 2005	PDF	39	29	15	12	5				10
Environics	21 December 2005	HTML	35	30	17	12	5	± 3.1	1,010		5
Strategic Counsel	21 December 2005	PDF	33	30	18	14	5				3
Leger Marketing	21 December 2005	PDF	36	28	17	12	5				8
Nanos Research	21 December 2005	PDF	37	29	15	12	6				8
Strategic Counsel	20 December 2005	PDF	34	30	16	15	5				4
Nanos Research	20 December 2005	PDF	37	31	14	13	6				6
Strategic Counsel	19 December 2005	PDF	33	29	17	15	6				4
Nanos Research	19 December 2005	PDF	37	29	16	13	5				8
Strategic Counsel	18 December 2005	PDF	34	29	19	13	5				5
Pollara	19 December 2005	HTML	37	34	17	10					3
Nanos Research	18 December 2005	PDF	38	29	16	12	4				9
Nanos Research	17 December 2005	PDF	38	30	15	13	4				8
Nanos Research	16 December 2005	PDF	39	31	14	12	5				8
Strategic Counsel	15 December 2005	PDF	34	30	18	13	5				4
Nanos Research	15 December 2005	PDF	39	33	12	12	5				6
Strategic Counsel	14 December 2005	PDF	34	30	17	14	5				4
Nanos Research	14 December 2005	PDF	39	32	12	12	5				7
Leger Marketing	13 December 2005	PDF	35	29	17	12	6				6
Strategic Counsel	13 December 2005	PDF	34	29	17	14	6				5
Nanos Research	13 December 2005	PDF	38	31	14	12	5				7
Strategic Counsel	12 December 2005	PDF	33	31	17	13	6				2
Nanos Research	12 December 2005	PDF	38	30	13	14	5				8
Ipsos-Reid	11 December 2005	PDF	36	27	17	14	5				9
Pollara	11 December 2005	HTML	38	30	15	12					8
Strategic Counsel	11 December 2005	PDF	34	30	16	14	6				4
Nanos Research	11 December 2005	PDF	39	31	14	13	4				8
Strategic Counsel	10 December 2005	PDF	35	30	15	14	6				5
Nanos Research	10 December 2005	PDF	39	32	14	13	4				7
Decima Research	9 December 2005	PDF	36	27	20	13	4				9
Nanos Research	9 December 2005	PDF	39	30	15	11	4				9
Strategic Counsel	8 December 2005	PDF	36	28	16	14	6				8
Nanos Research	8 December 2005	PDF	41	26	18	11	4				15
Ipsos-Reid	8 December 2005	PDF	34	30	15	14	5				4
Leger Marketing	7 December 2005	PDF	39	27	16	12	5				12
Strategic Counsel	7 December 2005	PDF	36	30	15	14	5				6
Nanos Research	7 December 2005	PDF	40	26	18	11	4				14
Strategic Counsel	6 December 2005	PDF	35	29	16	13	6				6
Nanos Research	6 December 2005	PDF	40	28	17	11	4				12
Decima Research	5 December 2005		34	26	20	14	—				8
Strategic Counsel	5 December 2005	PDF	35	29	16	14	6				6
Nanos Research	5 December 2005	PDF	38	30	16	12	5				8
Strategic Counsel	4 December 2005	PDF	35	29	16	14	6				6
Nanos Research	4 December 2005	PDF	37	30	16	13	5				7
Strategic Counsel	3 December 2005	HTML	34	30	16	14	6				4
Nanos Research	3 December 2005	PDF	38	29	15	14	5				9
Nanos Research	2 December 2005	PDF	36	31	14	14	5				5
Ipsos-Reid	1 December 2005	PDF	33	31	17	14	5				2
Strategic Counsel	1 December 2005	HTML	35	30	16	14	6				5
Nanos Research	1 December 2005	PDF	37	29	15	14	5				8
EKOS	1 December 2005	PDF	34.1	27.4	18.4	14.0	6.0				6.7
Strategic Counsel	30 November 2005	PDF	35	30	17	14	5				5
Ipsos-Reid	28 November 2005	HTML	31	31	18	15	5				0
Decima Research	28 November 2005		36	28	19	12	—				8
Strategic Counsel	27 November 2005	PDF	35	29	17	14	5				6
Pollara	27 November 2005	HTML	36	31	16	14	—				5
Environics	25 November 2005		35	30	20	14	1				5
EKOS	24 November 2005	PDF	38.7	29.4	16.9	10.6	3.0				9.3
Ipsos-Reid	24 November 2005	HTML	34	30	16	15	5				4
Ipsos-Reid	15 November 2005		36	27	16	13	6				9
Decima Research	14 November 2005	PDF	33	26	22	13	—				7
Pollara	13 November 2005		36	28	20	—					8
Nanos Research	13 November 2005	PDF	34	28	20	14	4				6
Ipsos-Reid	10 November 2005	PDF	34	28	19	14	4				6
EKOS	9 November 2005	PDF	33.0	27.9	20.9	13.1	4.9				5.1
Leger Marketing	8 November 2005	PDF	34	26	18	11	7				8
Decima Research	7 November 2005	PDF	33	30	20	14	—				3
Strategic Counsel	6 November 2005		35	28	16	13	8				7
Strategic Counsel	3 November 2005		28	31	20	13	7				3
Ipsos-Reid	2 November 2005		31	30	19	13					1
Nanos Research	27 October 2005	PDF	40	28	15	12	4				12
Ipsos-Reid	27 October 2005		38	26	18	11	5				12
Pollara	17 October 2005		38	30	17	—	—				8
Decima Research	17 October 2005	PDF	35	29	17	13	—				6
Environics	16 October 2005		38	27	20	10	—				11
Strategic Counsel	13 October 2005	PDF	38	25	15	14	—				13
Pollara	2 October 2005		36	30	19	11	—				6
Ipsos-Reid	29 September 2005	PDF	37	27	17	14	4				10
Decima Research	26 September 2005	PDF	36	29	17	13	—				7
Praxicus	23 September 2005		33	29	20	—	—				4
Strategic Counsel	13 September 2005		35	28	17	13	7				7
Leger Marketing	11 September 2005	PDF	40	24	15	13	5				16
Ipsos-Reid	22 August 2005		36	28	17	11	6				8
Strategic Counsel	15 August 2005		36	28	17	—	—				8
Nanos Research	8 August 2005	PDF	39	25	19	13	—				14
Environics	28 July 2005	HTML	34	31	20	11	—				3
Decima Research	25 July 2005	PDF	39	24	19	14	—				15
Pollara	18 July 2005		38	27	15	13	—				11
Strategic Counsel	16 July 2005		35	26	19	13	7				9
Pollara	28 June 2005		36	29	18	11	—				7
Ipsos-Reid	28 June 2005		35	27	18	13	6				8
Decima Research	20 June 2005	PDF	37	25	20	13	—				12
Ipsos-Reid	20 June 2005		34	29	16	12	6				5
Strategic Counsel	11 June 2005		34	26	19	13	9				8
Pollara	6 June 2005		38	27	19	13	—				11
Decima Research	5 June 2005	PDF	37	23	21	13	—				14
Decima Research	22 May 2005	PDF	36	27	21	13	—				9
Leger Marketing	22 May 2005	PDF	38	27	17	12	4	± 2.6%	1,509		11
Ipsos-Reid	20 May 2005		34	28	17	—	6				6
Strategic Counsel	18 May 2005		33	30	19	12	6				3
COMPAS	17 May 2005	PDF	29	38	17	13	—				9
EKOS	17 May 2005	PDF	34.7	28.3	18.4	12.6	5.6				6.4
Environics	17 May 2005		33	31	22	10	—				2
Decima Research	15 May 2005	PDF	32	31	19	14	—				1
Ipsos-Reid	14 May 2005		27	31	19	13	6				4
Strategic Counsel	10 May 2005		27	31	20	14	7				4
Decima Research	8 May 2005	PDF	37	28	18	12	—				9
Ipsos-Reid	7 May 2005		32	31	16	12	5				1
Nanos Research	5 May 2005		36.1	29.5	17.9	12.2	4.3				6.6
Pollara	4 May 2005		31	36	17	15	—				5
Decima Research	2 May 2005	PDF	32	29	20	15	—				3
Ipsos-Reid	28 April 2005	PDF	30	33	17	12	5	±3.1%	1000	Telephone	3
EKOS	28 April 2005	PDF	32.5	30.5	19.0	12.0	5.5				2
GPC P.A.	28 April 2005		33	30	13	13	10				3
Strategic Counsel	28 April 2005		30	28	18	16	10				2
Ipsos-Reid	24 April 2005	PDF	31	34	18	11	5	±3.1%	1000	Telephone	3
Decima Research	24 April 2005	PDF	27	32	21	15	—				5
Ipsos-Reid	21 April 2005	PDF	30	35	18	12	5	±3.1%	1000	Telephone	5
Pollara	21 April 2005		31	35	18	12	—				4
Nanos Research	18 April 2005		31.6	37.9	14.9	11.9	3.8				6.3
Decima Research	17 April 2005	PDF	28	35	18	14	—				7
Ipsos-Reid	14 April 2005	PDF	27	36	15	10	7	±3.1%	1000	Telephone	9
COMPAS	14 April 2005		30	34	18	15	1				4
Environics	14 April 2005		27	33	24	11	2				6
Environics	12 April 2005		36	30	19	11	4				6
Leger Marketing	11 April 2005	PDF	31	34	18	13	—	± 2.5%	1,504	Telephone	3
Ipsos-Reid	10 April 2005	PDF	27	30	19	12	7	±3.1%	1000	Telephone	3
Decima Research	10 April 2005	PDF	31	32	19	14	—				1
EKOS	9 April 2005	PDF	25.0	36.2	20.5	12.6	5.0				11.2
Ipsos-Reid	7 April 2005	PDF	34	30	15	10	7	±3.1%	1000	Telephone	4
Last election	28 June 2004	HTML	36.7	29.6	15.7	12.4	4.3				7.1

1. Strategic Counsel polls from 27 November onwards are multi-day polls. Each new poll removes approximately 1/3 of the data that is the oldest, and replaces it with new data from that day.
2. Nanos polls from December onwards are 3-day polls. Each new poll removes the 1/3 of the data that is the oldest, and replaces it with new data from that day.
3. Various EKOS polls contain results from a single night of polling only. They have fewer respondents than most other polls and, thus, EKOS notes that they are not as credible; however, they are intended to provide a general indication of daily polling trends.
4. This Compas poll was taken over the course of a single day.
5. Polling for this data mostly occurred before Jean Brault's Gomery Inquiry testimony was released.

NB: The margin of error in these surveys is typically between 2.5 and 3.5 percentage points, 19 times out of 20. See the links for actual error values associated with particular surveys. Because these figures are national percentages, they may not reflect the expected number of seats won by each party. Indeed, the sample size in many polls is not sufficient to give a statistically accurate prediction in individual ridings, and hence the expected number of seats.

All polling companies rely on cooperation from individuals contacted over the phone. The major companies claim a typical response rate is between 20 and 35 percent.

== Seat predictions ==
Several websites, polling firms and notable Canadians devised various method of projecting the final election result. Included below are those cited in Andrew Coyne's blog.

Projector	Conservative	Liberal	NDP	BQ	Other
Final Results HTML	124	103	29	51	1
ElectionPrediction.org	118	104	29	56	1
democraticSPACE.com	128	94	29	56	1
UBC Election Stock market	127	93	33	54	1
jord.ca	135	72	38	62	1
Loblaw Election Pool	136	89	26	57	0
Laurier University	140	78	33	56	1
Andrew Coyne	140	81	31	54	2
TrendLines Federal & Provincial Riding Projections	140	75	35	57	1
ElectionPolls	141	79	30	58	1
PinnacleSports.com	146	74	31	57	0
Ipsos-Reid	148–152	62–66	34–38	56–60	-

== See also ==
- 2006 Canadian federal election
- Opinion polling in the Canadian federal election, 2008
- Opinion polling in the Canadian federal election, 2011
- Opinion polling in the Canadian federal election, 2015
