= Opinion polling for the 2011 Canadian federal election =

This article provides a list of scientific, nationwide public opinion polls that were conducted leading up to the 2011 Canadian federal election.

== Graphical summary ==
Graph of polling from the 2008 election to the 2011 election

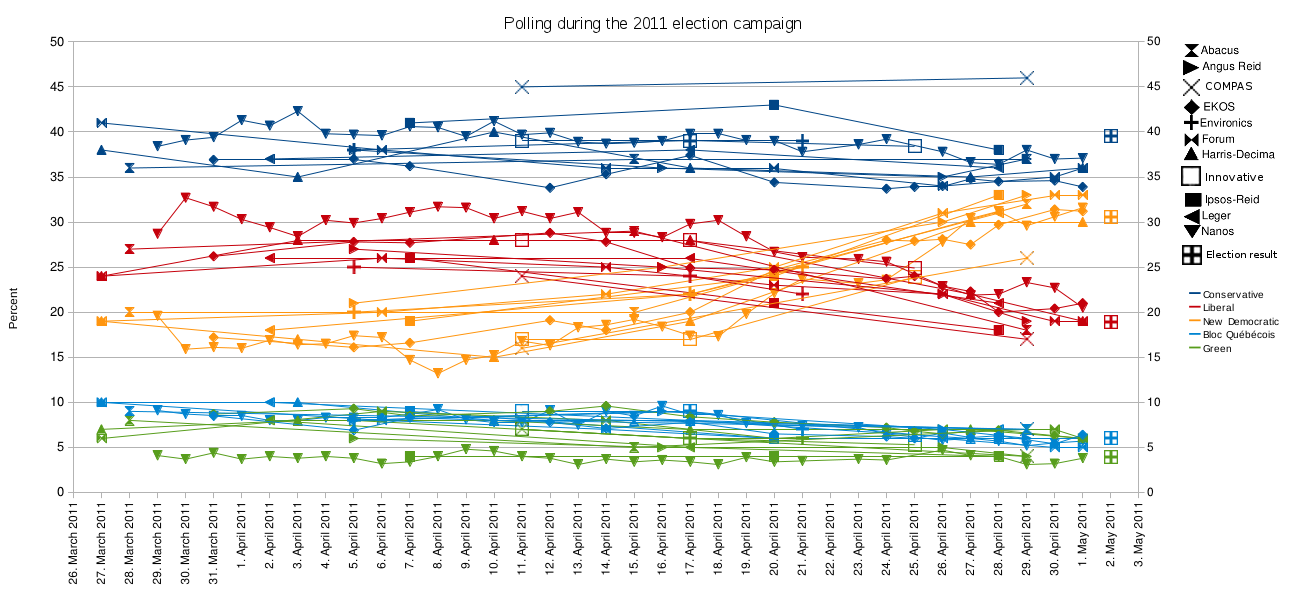
Graph of polling during the 2011 election showing trends by polling firm and party

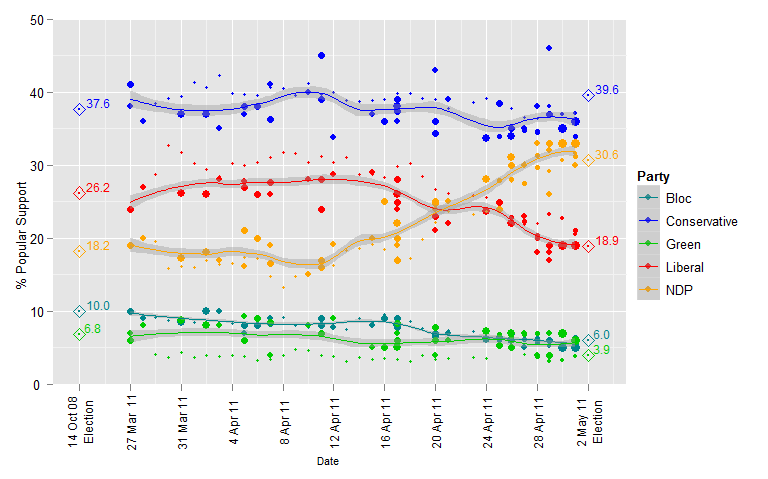
Graph of polling during the 2011 election showing average trend line and margin of error

== Campaign period ==
Polling firm	Last day of survey	Source	CPC	LPC	NDP	BQ	GPC	Other	Type	ME	Lead
Election results	May 2, 2011		39.6	18.9	30.6	6.0	3.9	0.9	—	—	9
Forum Research	May 1, 2011		36	19	33	5	6		Phone (IVR)	±1.6	3
EKOS Research Associates (Note: Based on a three-day rolling sample. To update the tracking, a new day of interviewing is added and the oldest day dropped.)	May 1, 2011		33.9	21.0	31.2	6.4	6.0	1.5	Phone (IVR)	±1.8	2.7
Nanos Research	May 1, 2011		37.1	20.5	31.6	5.7	3.8	1.4	Phone	±3.0	5.5
Harris-Decima	May 1, 2011		36	19	30	6	6		Phone	±3.1	6.1
EKOS Research Associates	April 30, 2011		34.6	20.4	31.4	5.4	6.3	1.8	Phone (IVR)	±1.8	3.2
Forum Research	April 30, 2011	2	35	19	33	5	7		Phone (IVR)	±1.6	2
Nanos Research	April 30, 2011		37.0	22.7	30.6	5.5	3.2		Phone	±3.0	6.4
Abacus Data	April 29, 2011		37	18	32	7	7		Online	±3.2	5
COMPAS	April 29, 2011		46	17	26	7	4		Phone	±3.6	20
Nanos Research	April 29, 2011		38.0	23.3	29.6	5.2	3.1		Phone	±3.0	8.4
Angus Reid Public Opinion	April 29, 2011		37	19	33	6	4		Online	±2.2	4
Leger Marketing	April 28, 2011		36	21	31	7	4		Online	±1.7	5
Ipsos Reid	April 28, 2011		38	18	33	6	4		Phone	±3.1	5
EKOS Research Associates	April 28, 2011		34.5	20.0	29.7	6.3	6.9	2.7	Phone (IVR)	±1.8	4.8
Nanos Research	April 28, 2011		36.4	22.0	31.2	5.7	4.0		Phone	±3.1	5.2
Harris-Decima	April 27, 2011		35	22	30	5	7		Phone	±3.1	5
EKOS Research Associates	April 27, 2011		34.8	22.3	27.5	6.1	6.8	2.5	Phone (IVR)	±1.9	7.3
Nanos Research	April 27, 2011		36.6	21.9	30.4	6.0	4.1		Phone	±3.1	6.2
EKOS Research Associates	April 26, 2011		34.0	22.9	28.1	6.6	6.5	1.9	Phone (IVR)	±1.9	5.9
Forum Research	April 26, 2011		34	22	31	6	7		Phone (IVR)	±1.8	3
Nanos Research	April 26, 2011		37.8	22.9	27.8	5.8	4.7		Phone	±3.1	10
Angus Reid Public Opinion	April 26, 2011		35	22	30	7	5	1	Online	±2.2	5
EKOS Research Associates	April 25, 2011		33.9	24.0	27.9	6.0	6.8	1.4	Phone (IVR)	±2.0	6
Innovative Research Group	April 25, 2011		38.4	24.9	23.9	6.4	5.3		Phone	±2.49	13.5
EKOS Research Associates	April 24, 2011		33.7	23.7	28.0	6.2	7.2	1.2	Phone (IVR)	±1.9	5
Nanos Research	April 24, 2011		39.2	25.6	23.6	6.5	3.6		Phone	±3.1	13.6
Nanos Research	April 23, 2011		38.6	25.9	23.2	7.2	3.7		Phone	±3.1	12.7
Environics	April 21, 2011		39	22	25	7	6	1	Phone	±3.2	14
Nanos Research	April 21, 2011		37.8	26.1	23.7	7.4	3.5		Phone	±3.1	11.7
Ipsos Reid	April 20, 2011		43	21	24	6	4		Phone	±3.1	19
Forum Research	April 20, 2011		36	23	25	6	6		Phone (IVR)	±2.2	11
Nanos Research	April 20, 2011		39.0	26.7	22.1	7.5	3.4		Phone	±3.1	12.3
EKOS Research Associates	April 20, 2011		34.4	24.7	24.7	6.5	7.8	1.9	Phone (IVR)	±2.2	9.7
Nanos Research	April 19, 2011		39.1	28.4	19.8	7.7	3.9		Phone	±3.1	10.7
Nanos Research	April 18, 2011		39.8	30.2	17.3	8.6	3.1		Phone	±3.1	9.6
Innovative Research Group	April 17, 2011		39	28	17	9	6	1	Phone	±2.25	11
Environics	April 17, 2011		39	24	22	9	6	1	Phone	±3.2	15
EKOS Research Associates	April 17, 2011		37.4	24.9	20.0	7.8	8.4	1.5	Phone (IVR)	±2.2	12.5
Harris-Decima	April 17, 2011		36	28	19	8	7		Phone	±3.1	8
Nanos Research	April 17, 2011		39.8	29.8	17.4	8.6	3.4		Phone	±3.1	10
Leger Marketing	April 17, 2011		38	26	22	8	5		Online	±1.7	12
Angus Reid Public Opinion	April 16, 2011		36	25	25	9	5		Online	±2.2	11
Nanos Research	April 16, 2011		39.0	28.3	18.4	9.6	3.6		Phone	±3.1	10.7
Abacus Data	April 15, 2011		37	29	20	8	5		Online	±3.2	8
Nanos Research	April 15, 2011		38.8	28.8	19.2	8.5	3.4		Phone	±3.1	10
Forum Research	April 14, 2011		36	25	22	7	8		Phone	±2.2	11
EKOS Research Associates	April 14, 2011		35.3	27.8	18.0	7.1	9.6	2.1	Phone (IVR)	±2.8	7.5
Nanos Research	April 14, 2011		38.7	28.8	18.6	9.0	3.7		Phone	±3.1	9.9
Nanos Research	April 13, 2011		38.9	31.1	18.3	7.5	3.1		Phone	±3.1	7.8
EKOS Research Associates	April 12, 2011		33.8	28.8	19.1	7.8	9.0	1.5	Phone (IVR)	±2.9	5
Nanos Research	April 12, 2011		39.9	30.4	16.3	9.1	3.8		Phone	±3.1	9.5
COMPAS	April 11, 2011		45	24	16	8	7		Phone	±2.1	21
Innovative Research Group	April 11, 2011		39	28	17	9	7		Online	±2.16	11
Nanos Research	April 11, 2011		39.7	31.2	16.8	7.8	4.0		Phone	±3.1	8.5
Harris-Decima	April 10, 2011		40	28	15	8	8		Phone	±3.1	12
Nanos Research	April 10, 2011		41.2	30.4	15.2	7.8	4.6		Phone	±3.1	10.8
Nanos Research	April 9, 2011		39.5	31.6	14.7	8.1	4.8		Phone	±3.1	7.9
TNS Canada	April 8, 2011		36	25	18	9	9		Phone	±3.1	11
Nanos Research	April 8, 2011		40.5	31.7	13.2	9.2	4.0		Phone	±3.1	8.8
Ipsos Reid	April 7, 2011		41	26	19	9	4		Phone	±3.1	15
EKOS Research Associates	April 7, 2011		36.2	27.7	16.6	8.3	8.5	2.8	Phone (IVR)	±2.1	8.5
Nanos Research	April 7, 2011		40.6	31.1	14.7	8.7	3.4		Phone	±3.1	9.5
Forum Research	April 6, 2011		38	26	20	8	9		Phone	±2.2	12
Nanos Research	April 6, 2011		39.6	30.4	17.2	8.3	3.2		Phone	±3.1	9.2
Environics	April 5, 2011		38	25	20	8	8		Phone	±3.1	13
Angus Reid Public Opinion	April 5, 2011		38	27	21	8	6		Online	±2.2	11
EKOS Research Associates	April 5, 2011		37.0	27.8	16.1	6.9	9.3	2.9	Phone (IVR)	±3.0	9.2
Nanos Research	April 5, 2011		39.7	29.9	17.4	8.3	3.8		Phone	±3.1	9.8
Nanos Research	April 4, 2011		39.8	30.2	16.5	8.3	4.0		Phone	±3.1	9.6
Harris-Decima	April 3, 2011		35	28	17	10	8		Phone	±3.1	7
Nanos Research	April 3, 2011		42.3	28.4	16.4	8.0	3.8		Phone	±3.1	13.9
Leger Marketing	April 2, 2011		37	26	18	10	8		Online	±1.7	11
Nanos Research	April 2, 2011		40.7	29.4	16.9	8.0	4.0		Phone	±3.1	11.3
Nanos Research	April 1, 2011		41.3	30.3	16.0	8.5	3.7		Phone	±3.1	11
EKOS Research Associates	March 31, 2011		36.9	26.2	17.2	8.5	8.7	2.5	Phone (IVR)	±1.9	10.7
Nanos Research	March 31, 2011		39.4	31.7	16.1	8.5	4.4		Phone	±3.2	7.7
Nanos Research	March 30, 2011		39.1	32.7	15.9	8.7	3.7		Phone	±3.2	6.4
Nanos Research	March 29, 2011		38.4	28.7	19.6	9.1	4.1		Phone	±3.2	9.7
Abacus Data	March 28, 2011		36	27	20	9	8		Online	±3.2	9
Harris-Decima	March 27, 2011		38	24	19	10	7		Phone	±3.1	14
Forum Research	March 27, 2011		41	24	19	10	6		Phone	±2.2	17

== Pre-campaign period ==
Polling firm	Last day of survey	Source	CPC	LPC	NDP	BQ	GPC	ME
Angus Reid Public Opinion	March 24, 2011		39	25	19	10	7	±2 pp
Leger Marketing	March 24, 2011		39	23	19	9	7	±1.7 pp
EKOS Research Associates	March 24, 2011		35.3	28.1	14.2	9.7	10.6	±2.0 pp (c-95%)
Ipsos Reid	March 23, 2011		43	24	16	10	6	±3.1 pp (c-95%)
Harris-Decima	March 20, 2011		34	28	17	10	9	±2.2 pp (c-95%)
EKOS Research Associates	March 16, 2011		34.1	25.7	16.4	10.2	10.4	±2.8 pp
Nanos Research	March 15, 2011		38.6	27.6	19.9	10.1	3.8	±3.2 pp
Leger Marketing	March 10, 2011		36	23	18	10	10	±2.1 pp
Ipsos Reid	March 9, 2011		40	27	16	11	5	±3.1 pp (c-95%)
Angus Reid Public Opinion	March 9, 2011		39	23	17	9	9	±3.1 pp
EKOS Research Associates	March 8, 2011		35.2	27.8	14.9	8.8	10.1	±2.0 pp
Harris-Decima	February 27, 2011		36	28	15	9	9	±2.2 pp (c-95%)
Ipsos Reid	February 27, 2011		43	27	13	10	5	±3.1 pp (c-95%)
Abacus Data	February 23, 2011		38	23	19	11	8	±3.1 pp (c-95%)
EKOS Research Associates	February 22, 2011		32.4	27.3	14.8	10.5	11.9	±2.0 pp
Angus Reid Public Opinion	February 18, 2011		39	26	18	9	6	±1.2 pp
Nanos Research	February 14, 2011		39.7	26.6	18.9	9.9	4.9	±3.4 pp
Harris-Decima	February 13, 2011		37	27	14	10	10	±3.1 pp (c=95%)
Ipsos Reid	February 10, 2011		39	25	18	9	10	±3.1 pp
EKOS Research Associates	February 9, 2011		37.3	24.8	14.2	9.9	10.7	±2.4 pp
Ipsos Reid	February 2, 2011		34	29	16	11	10	±3.1 pp
EKOS Research Associates	January 26, 2011		35.4	27.9	14.8	9.7	9.8	±1.4 pp (c=95%)
Abacus Data	January 24, 2011		35	27	18	10	9	±3.0 pp (c=95%)
Pollara	January 24, 2011		35	28	19	10	8	not stated
Harris-Decima	January 16, 2011		36	28	15	9	9	±2.2 pp (c=95%)
EKOS Research Associates	January 12, 2011		34.5	27.3	14.8	9.8	10.3	±1.7 pp (c=95%)
Angus Reid Public Opinion	January 9, 2011		34	28	17	11	8	±3.1 pp
EKOS Research Associates	December 15, 2010		32.0	26.5	17.1	10.6	10.9	±2.0 pp (c=95%)
Harris-Decima	December 13, 2010		31	29	15	9	11	±2.2 pp (c=95%)
Ipsos Reid	December 9, 2010		39	29	12	10	9	±3.1 pp
Angus Reid Public Opinion	December 7, 2010		38	26	18	10	7	±3.1 pp
EKOS Research Associates	December 7, 2010		33.7	29.2	14.4	9.8	10.4	±2.7 pp (c=95%)
Abacus Data	December 6, 2010		35	24	20	10	10	±3.1 pp (c=95%)
Nanos Research	December 5, 2010		38.1	31.2	17.2	10.2	3.2	±3.6 pp (c=95%)
EKOS Research Associates	November 30, 2010		32.6	27.4	15.8	9.9	10.9	±2.2 pp (c=95%)
EKOS Research Associates	November 23, 2010		33.3	27.1	16.6	9.5	9.5	±2.2 pp (c=95%)
EKOS Research Associates	November 16, 2010		32.4	28.7	16.3	9.9	9.8	±2.5 pp (c=95%)
EKOS Research Associates	November 9, 2010		29.4	28.6	19.3	9.3	10.7	±2.3 pp (c=95%)
Nanos Research	November 5, 2010		37.1	31.6	15.4	10.8	5.2	±3.4 pp (c=95%)
Ipsos Reid	November 4, 2010		35	29	16	8	11	±3.1 pp (c=95%)
Abacus Data	November 1, 2010		33	25	21	10	10	±3.1 pp (c=95%)
Harris-Decima	October 31, 2010		33	28	17	9	10	±2.2 pp (c=95%)
Angus Reid Public Opinion	October 26, 2010		37	26	19	10	6	±3.1 pp (c=95%)
EKOS Research Associates	October 26, 2010		33.9	27.8	15.1	9.3	11.6	±3.0 pp (c=95%)
EKOS Research Associates	October 19, 2010		30.9	29.4	13.9	11.2	11.6	±2.5 pp (c=95%)
Harris-Decima	October 17, 2010		32	30	14	10	10	±2.2 pp (c=95%)
EKOS Research Associates	October 12, 2010		34.4	27.8	15.8	9.3	10.4	±2.5 pp (c=95%)
Nanos Research	October 6, 2010		36.6	32.4	16.3	9.8	4.9	±3.4 pp (c=95%)
EKOS Research Associates	October 5, 2010		31.8	27.6	16.5	9.7	11.2	±2.0 pp (c=95%)
Angus Reid Public Opinion	September 28, 2010		34	26	18	10	11	±3.1 pp (c=95%)
EKOS Research Associates	September 28, 2010		33.1	29.9	13.5	10.1	10.9	±2.3 pp (c=95%)
Ipsos Reid	September 23, 2010		35	29	12	11	12	±3.1 pp (c=95%)
EKOS Research Associates	September 21, 2010		31.7	29.3	14.6	9.7	11.8	±2.5 pp (c=95%)
Harris-Decima	September 19, 2010		33	30	14	10	11	±2.2 pp (c=95%)
EKOS Research Associates	September 14, 2010		32.4	28.9	16.6	8.9	10.7	±2.3 pp (c=95%)
Ipsos Reid	September 12, 2010		34	31	16	10	9	±3.1 pp (c=95%)
Environics	September 10, 2010		35	31	16	9	7	±2.3 pp (c=95%)
EKOS Research Associates	September 7, 2010		32.1	28.5	15.2	9.5	12.5	±2.3 pp (c=95%)
Nanos Research	September 3, 2010		33.3	32.8	15.6	12.1	6.2	±3.4 pp (c=95%)
EKOS Research Associates	August 31, 2010		29.4	29.1	15.7	10.9	13	±2.7 pp (c=95%)
EKOS Research Associates	August 24, 2010		31.1	27.6	16.9	11.2	10.7	±2.5 pp (c=95%)
Harris-Decima	August 22, 2010		33	30	16	9	10	±2.2 pp (c=95%)
EKOS Research Associates	August 17, 2010		32.5	27.9	17.4	9.2	10.3	±1.8 pp (c=95%)
Angus Reid Public Opinion	August 11, 2010		33	29	19	10	9	±3.1 pp (c=95%)
EKOS Research Associates	August 10, 2010		32.2	27.7	15.4	9.5	12.3	±2.1 pp (c=95%)
Ipsos Reid	August 9, 2010		34	31	15	9	9	payment required
Harris-Decima	August 9, 2010		34	28	15	9	12	±2.2 pp (c=95%)
Leger Marketing	August 4, 2010		37	28	16	9	8	±2.5 pp (c=95%)
EKOS Research Associates	August 3, 2010		29.7	28.5	17.4	10.4	11.1	±2.5 pp (c=95%)
EKOS Research Associates	July 27, 2010		33.2	25.2	17.4	10.1	11.1	±2.6 pp (c=95%)
Harris-Decima	July 25, 2010		31	26	18	10	12	±2.2 pp (c=95%)
EKOS Research Associates	July 20, 2010		32.4	25.5	18.4	10.0	10.1	±3.1 pp (c=95%)
EKOS Research Associates	July 13, 2010		31.6	27.5	14.7	10.1	13.3	±2.6 pp (c=95%)
Angus Reid Public Opinion	July 8, 2010		36	27	20	10	7	±2.2 pp (c=95%)
Ipsos Reid	July 8, 2010		35	29	15	11	10	payment required
Environics	July 8, 2010		35	32	15	9	6	±2.2 pp (c=95%)
EKOS Research Associates	July 6, 2010		32.1	25.8	17.5	9.7	12.2	±1.7 pp (c=95%)
EKOS Research Associates	June 21, 2010		31	27.7	16.5	9.3	13	±2.4 pp (c=95%)
Harris-Decima	June 20, 2010		34	27	17	11	10	±2.2 pp (c=95%)
EKOS Research Associates	June 15, 2010		30.5	26.3	17.4	10.5	12.3	±2.4 pp (c=95%)
Ipsos Reid	June 10, 2010		35	27	16	10	11	±3.1 pp
EKOS Research Associates	June 8, 2010		31.4	26.8	16.6	8.9	12.6	2.3
Nanos Research	June 3, 2010		35.6	29.2	20.7	9.4	5.1	3.6
EKOS Research Associates	June 1, 2010		31.7	26.2	17.4	10.3	11.5	2.0
Leger Marketing	May 27, 2010		37	25	17	11	8	2.7
Angus Reid Public Opinion	May 27, 2010		35	27	19	9	8	2.2
Environics	May 26, 2010		36	30	15	10	7	2.2
EKOS Research Associates	May 25, 2010		33.9	25.7	16.4	9.4	11.9	2.1
Harris-Decima	May 23, 2010		36	27	16	8	11	2.2
EKOS Research Associates	May 18, 2010		34.4	25.1	15.3	10.6	12	1.9
Harris-Decima	May 16, 2010		32	28	17	10	11	2.2
EKOS Research Associates	May 11, 2010		33.6	27.1	16.9	9.3	10.6	1.9
Ipsos Reid	May 6, 2010		35	29	16	10	9	payment required
EKOS Research Associates	May 4, 2010		33.1	26.1	16	10.2	11.5	2.1
Nanos Research	May 3, 2010		37.2	33.2	16.2	9.6	3.8	3.1
Angus Reid Public Opinion	April 29, 2010		35	28	19	11	7	3.1
Leger Marketing	April 29, 2010		36	25	20	9	8	2.5
EKOS Research Associates	April 27, 2010		31.9	26.6	17.6	9.7	10.9	2.2
Harris-Decima	April 25, 2010		29	27	20	11	12	2.2
Ipsos Reid	April 22, 2010		35	29	16	9	10	payment required
EKOS Research Associates	April 20, 2010		31.7	27.1	16.3	9.5	12.6	2.3
EKOS Research Associates	April 13, 2010		31.4	29	16.4	8.8	11.1	2.7
Ipsos Reid	April 8, 2010		37	27	15	10	10	3.1
EKOS Research Associates	April 6, 2010		33.6	27.3	15.9	9.6	11.7	3.3
Harris-Decima	April 5, 2010		32	29	17	9	11	
EKOS Research Associates	March 30, 2010		32.2	27	16	9	12.7	2.1
Angus Reid Public Opinion	March 26, 2010		35	29	20	9	7	3.1
EKOS Research Associates	March 23, 2010		33.3	27.7	15.9	9.8	10.4	1.8
Ipsos Reid	March 18, 2010		34	28	18	9	10	
EKOS Research Associates	March 16, 2010		33.1	28.9	15.7	9.2	10.8	2.0
Nanos Research	March 11, 2010		34.7	34.6	17.8	7.7	5.2	3.5
EKOS Research Associates	March 9, 2010		31.9	29.6	16	9.1	11	2.0
Harris-Decima	March 7, 2010		33	29	16	10	11	
EKOS Research Associates	March 2, 2010		32.4	29.4	15.2	9.4	10.5	1.9
Harris-Decima	February 28, 2010		31	31	16	8	12	2.2
Angus Reid Public Opinion	February 26, 2010		33	29	20	9	9	3.1
Environics	February 24, 2010		31	30	16	9	13	3.1
EKOS Research Associates	February 23, 2010		33.4	30.3	15.8	8.2	10.4	1.8
Ipsos Reid	February 22, 2010		37	29	16	9	7	
EKOS Research Associates	February 16, 2010		31.2	29.0	16.5	8.8	11.8	1.6
Harris-Decima	February 14, 2010		32	30	16	10	10	
Angus Reid Public Opinion	February 13, 2010		34	30	18	9	8	2.2
Environics	February 9, 2010		33	37	13	8	9	3.2
EKOS Research Associates	February 9, 2010		31.0	29.0	15.5	10.3	11.3	1.8
Nanos Research	February 4, 2010		35.6	33.9	16.4	8.5	5.6	3.5
EKOS Research Associates	February 2, 2010		31.0	31.9	15.4	8.4	10.9	1.68
Harris-Decima	January 31, 2010		32	32	15	10	9	
Angus Reid Public Opinion	January 26, 2010		33	29	19	10	7	3.1
EKOS Research Associates	January 26, 2010		31.1	31.6	14.6	9.1	11	1.7
Harris-Decima	January 24, 2010		32	31	15	10	10	3.1
Ipsos Reid	January 21, 2010		34	31	17	9	8	
EKOS Research Associates	January 19, 2010		31.5	30.9	14.9	9.1	11.5	1.8
Angus Reid Public Opinion	January 13, 2010		34	28	19	9	8	3.0
EKOS Research Associates	January 12, 2010		30.9	29.3	15.3	10.2	11.9	1.6
Harris-Decima	January 10, 2010		34	30	16	9	9	
Strategic Counsel	January 8, 2010		31	30	18	9	10	
Angus Reid Public Opinion	January 6, 2010		36	29	17	10	8	
EKOS Research Associates	January 5, 2010		33.1	27.8	16.0	9.8	13.4	
EKOS Research Associates	December 15, 2009		35.9	26.7	17.0	9.2	11.2	
Nanos Research	December 13, 2009		39.5	30.2	18.7	7.7	4	
Angus Reid Public Opinion	December 10, 2009		36	29	16	11	6	
EKOS Research Associates	December 8, 2009		35.6	26.5	16.7	9.9	11.3	
EKOS Research Associates	November 24, 2009		36.9	27.1	15.3	9.4	11.4	
Ipsos Reid	November 19, 2009		37	24	19	9	10	
Angus Reid Public Opinion	November 16, 2009		38	23	17	11	10	
Nanos Research	November 10, 2009		38	28.8	17.9	9.3	5.9	
EKOS Research Associates	November 10, 2009		36.6	26.6	16.8	8.8	11.2	
EKOS Research Associates	November 3, 2009		37.4	26.8	16.3	9.4	10.0	
EKOS Research Associates	October 27, 2009		38.4	26.8	16.7	8.2	9.9	
Angus Reid Strategies	October 24, 2009		40	26	17	9	7	
Ipsos Reid	October 22, 2009		40	25	13	11	11	
Environics	October 21, 2009		38	26	16	8	10	
EKOS Research Associates	October 20, 2009		38.3	27.1	14.5	9.0	11.0	
Nanos Research	October 18, 2009		39.8	30	16.6	8.9	4.6	
Angus Reid Strategies	October 14, 2009		41	27	16	8	6	
EKOS Research Associates	October 13, 2009		40.7	25.5	14.3	9.1	10.5	
Harris-Decima	October 12, 2009		35	28	15	10	10	
Ipsos Reid	October 8, 2009		39	29	13	10	8	
EKOS Research Associates	October 6, 2009		39.7	25.7	15.2	9.7	9.7	
Strategic Counsel	October 4, 2009		41	28	14	9	9	
Angus Reid Strategies	September 30, 2009		37	27	17	11	6	
EKOS Research Associates	September 29, 2009		36.0	29.7	13.9	9.8	10.5	
Angus Reid Strategies	September 24, 2009		37	29	16	9	8	
EKOS Research Associates	September 22, 2009		37.0	29.9	13.8	9.1	10.2	
EKOS Research Associates	September 15, 2009		35.1	29.9	16.5	9.6	9.0	
Angus Reid Strategies	September 13, 2009		36	29	17	10	7	
Harris-Decima	September 13, 2009		34	30	15	9	10	
Ipsos Reid	September 13, 2009		39	30	12	9	8	
EKOS Research Associates	September 8, 2009		34.2	30.8	14.8	10	10.1	
Harris-Decima	September 6, 2009		34	31	15	8	10	
Strategic Counsel	September 6, 2009		35	30	14	12	9	
Nanos Research	September 2, 2009		37.5	33.4	14.8	9.7	4.6	
Angus Reid Strategies	September 2, 2009		33	32	19	9	7	
EKOS Research Associates	September 1, 2009		32.6	32.6	16.5	8.3	9.9	
Pollara	September 1, 2009		36	36	16	8	3	
Angus Reid Strategies	August 26, 2009		34	30	18	8	9	
EKOS Research Associates	August 25, 2009		32.6	30.9	15.7	9.5	11.3	
Harris-Decima	August 24, 2009		31	32	16	9	11	
Ipsos Reid	August 24, 2009		39	28	14	8	10	
EKOS Research Associates	August 18, 2009		32.0	30.2	17.3	8.7	11.0	
EKOS Research Associates	August 11, 2009		32.7	31.0	16.5	9.0	10.1	
EKOS Research Associates	August 4, 2009		34.9	31.9	13.8	8.6	10.8	
Nanos Research	August 2, 2009		31.3	33.8	18.7	9.2	7.0	
Angus Reid Strategies	July 28, 2009		33	34	16	10	7	
EKOS Research Associates	July 28, 2009		32.5	34.1	14.5	8.6	10.4	
EKOS Research Associates	July 21, 2009		32.8	32.5	14.8	8.4	11.5	
Angus Reid Strategies	July 17, 2009		33	30	18	11	6	
EKOS Research Associates	July 14, 2009		34.1	32.4	15.2	8.7	9.6	
EKOS Research Associates	July 7, 2009		31.8	32.2	16.0	9.3	10.7	
Angus Reid Strategies	July 3, 2009		36	30	16	10	7	
EKOS Research Associates	June 29, 2009		31.0	32.2	16.2	9.0	11.5	
EKOS Research Associates	June 23, 2009		34.8	32.6	14.3	9.0	9.3	
Nanos Research	June 21, 2009		32.2	36.3	16.8	9.8	4.8	
Angus Reid Strategies	June 18, 2009		32	31	18	11	7	
EKOS Research Associates	June 16, 2009		32.4	33.7	16.3	8.4	9.0	
EKOS Research Associates	June 9, 2009		30.3	35.0	15.1	9.2	10.4	
Harris-Decima	June 8, 2009		31	35	15	9	8	
Strategic Counsel	June 7, 2009		30	34	16	9	11	
Ipsos Reid	June 4, 2009		33	36	12	9	9	
Nanos Research	June 1, 2009		31.8	37.2	15.7	8.0	7.4	
Angus Reid Strategies	May 29, 2009		31	33	17	9	7	
EKOS Research Associates	May 28, 2009		32.3	33.5	15.1	8.7	10.4	
Ipsos Reid	May 24, 2009		35	33	14	9	8	
Strategic Counsel	May 10, 2009		30	35	16	9	11	
Harris-Decima	May 3, 2009		29	34	15	9	11	
Nanos Research	April 30, 2009		33	36	15	9	7	
Ipsos Reid	April 30, 2009		33	36	13	9	8	
Angus Reid Strategies	April 22, 2009		33	33	15	10	6	
Harris-Decima	April 19, 2009		29	32	16	9	11	
EKOS Research Associates	April 13, 2009		30.2	36.7	15.5	9.4	8.1	
Strategic Counsel	April 5, 2009		32	34	15	10	9	
Leger Marketing	March 23, 2009		34	35	14	9	6	
Nanos Research	March 18, 2009		33	36	13	10	8	
Angus Reid Strategies	March 11, 2009		35	31	16	10	7	
Harris-Decima	March 8, 2009		32	33	14	9	10	
Strategic Counsel	March 8, 2009		35	31	16	9	10	
Ipsos Reid	March 5, 2009		37	33	12	10	8	
Harris-Decima	February 15, 2009		33	33	15	10	7	
Strategic Counsel	February 8, 2009		32	33	17	5	13	
Harris-Decima	February 8, 2009		33	31	15	10	10	
Ipsos Reid	February 7, 2009		37	31	14	10	7	
Nanos Research	February 3, 2009		34	33	16	10	7	
Angus Reid Strategies	January 27, 2009		38	29	18	8	6	
EKOS Research Associates	January 17, 2009		36.2	32.6	14.3	7.9	9.1	
Angus Reid Strategies	January 15, 2009		39	30	17	9	5	
Strategic Counsel	January 14, 2009		36	29	18	8	8	
Ipsos Reid	January 8, 2009		39	28	15	9	9	
Nanos Research	January 7, 2009		33	34	19	7	7	
COMPAS	December 23, 2008		43	30	13	6	8	
Angus Reid Strategies	December 12, 2008		37	31	15	9	8	
Ipsos Reid	December 11, 2008		45	26	12	10	7	
Angus Reid Strategies	December 6, 2008		42	22	18	10	7	
Praxicus Public Strategies	December 4, 2008		47	24	14	8	8	
COMPAS	December 4, 2008		51	20	10	8	6	
EKOS Research Associates	December 4, 2008		42.2	23.6	15.0	10.2	9.0	
Strategic Counsel	December 3, 2008		45	24	14	10	8	
Ipsos Reid	December 3, 2008		46	23	13	9	8	
EKOS Research Associates	December 3, 2008		44.0	24.1	14.5	9.2	8.1	
Nanos Research	November 15, 2008		32	30	20	9	10	
Election 2008	October 14, 2008		37.6	26.2	18.2	10.0	6.8	

== Leadership polls ==
Aside from conducting the usual opinion surveys on general party preferences, polling firms also survey public opinion on who would make the best prime minister:

Polling firm	Last day of survey	Source	Stephen Harper	Michael Ignatieff	Jack Layton	Gilles Duceppe	Elizabeth May
Angus Reid Public Opinion	April 29, 2011		31	11	29	3	1
Ipsos Reid	April 28, 2011		42	13	45	-	-
Angus Reid Public Opinion	April 16, 2011		28	13	27	3	3
Angus Reid Public Opinion	April 5, 2011		30	14	21	3	3
Ipsos Reid	March 26, 2011		49	17	34	-	-

== See also ==
- Opinion polling in the Canadian federal election, 2006
- Opinion polling in the Canadian federal election, 2008
- Opinion polling in the Canadian federal election, 2015
