= Opinion polling for the 2011 Canadian federal election by constituency =

Various polling organisations have been conducting opinion polling in specific ridings in the lead up to the 2011 Canadian general election. The results of publicised opinion polling for individual constituencies are detailed in this article.

Opinion polls have been conducted from the months following the previous general election held in October 2008, and have increased in frequency leading up to the general election.

Given the expense of polling individual constituencies, constituencies are usually only polled if they are of some particular interest, e.g. they are thought to be marginal or facing an impending by-election. The constituencies polled are not necessarily representative of a national average swing. Under the first-past-the-post electoral system the true marginal seats, by definition, will be decisive as to the outcome of the election.

A total of 20 polls in 17 ridings across 2 provinces were conducted.

== Constituency polls ==
=== British Columbia ===
==== Saanich—Gulf Islands ====
Polling Firm	Last Date of Polling	Link	Cons.	Liberal	NDP	Green	Other	Margin of Error^{[1]}	Sample Size^{[2]}	Polling Method^{[3]}
Oracle	April 19, 2011	HTML	38	9	9	45	0	±4.9 pp	389	IVR
2008 Election	October 14, 2008	HTML	43	39	6	10	1	±0.0 pp	64,639	Election

=== Quebec ===
==== Beauport—Limoilou ====
Polling Firm	Last Date of Polling	Link	Cons.	Liberal	NDP	BQ	Green	Other	Margin of Error^{[1]}	Sample Size^{[2]}	Polling Method^{[3]}
CROP	April 27, 2011	HTML	27	5	36	30	2	0	±4.9 pp	400	IVR
2008 Election	October 14, 2008	HTML	37	14	12	33	3	1	±0.0 pp	49,794	Election

==== Charlesbourg—Haute-Saint-Charles ====
Polling Firm	Last Date of Polling	Link	Cons.	Liberal	NDP	BQ	Green	Other	Margin of Error^{[1]}	Sample Size^{[2]}	Polling Method^{[3]}
CROP	April 27, 2011	HTML	31	9	35	22	3	0	±4.9 pp	400	IVR
2008 Election	October 14, 2008	HTML	41	14	13	29	2	0	±0.0 pp	50,791	Election

==== Chicoutimi—Le Fjord ====
Polling Firm	Last Date of Polling	Link	Cons.	Liberal	NDP	BQ	Green	Other	Margin of Error^{[1]}	Sample Size^{[2]}	Polling Method^{[3]}
CROP	April 27, 2011	HTML	18	9	27	43	3	0	±4.9 pp	400	IVR
Segma Research	April 21, 2011	HTML	29	11	23	35	3	0	±4.6 pp	432	IVR
2008 Election	October 14, 2008	HTML	35	13	8	41	2	0	±0.0 pp	48,533	Election

==== Gaspésie—Les Îles-de-la-Madeleine ====
Polling Firm	Last Date of Polling	Link	Cons.	Liberal	NDP	BQ	Green	Other	Margin of Error^{[1]}	Sample Size^{[2]}	Polling Method^{[3]}
Segma Research	April 13, 2011	HTML	14	19	11	48	6	0	±4.9 pp	435	IVR
2008 Election	October 14, 2008	HTML	23	27	7	40	3	0	±0.0 pp	36,940	Election

==== Haute-Gaspésie—La Mitis—Matane—Matapédia ====
Polling Firm	Last Date of Polling	Link	Cons.	Liberal	NDP	BQ	Green	Other	Margin of Error^{[1]}	Sample Size^{[2]}	Polling Method^{[3]}
Segma Research	April 13, 2011	HTML	15	24	5	49	5	0	±4.9 pp	435	IVR
2008 Election	October 14, 2008	HTML	18	36	5	38	4	1	±0.0 pp	32,268	Election

==== Hull—Aylmer ====
Polling Firm	Last Date of Polling	Link	Cons.	Liberal	NDP	BQ	Green	Other	Margin of Error^{[1]}	Sample Size^{[2]}	Polling Method^{[3]}
Segma Research	April 23, 2011	HTML	11	29	42	13	2	0	±4.4 pp	500	IVR
2008 Election	October 14, 2008	HTML	15	37	20	22	5	0	±0.0 pp	52,707	Election

==== Jonquière—Alma ====
Polling Firm	Last Date of Polling	Link	Cons.	Liberal	NDP	BQ	Green	Other	Margin of Error^{[1]}	Sample Size^{[2]}	Polling Method^{[3]}
CROP	April 27, 2011	HTML	34	4	32	25	3	0	±4.9 pp	400	IVR
Segma Research	April 21, 2011	HTML	36	5	30	26	3	0	±4.6 pp	432	IVR
2008 Election	October 14, 2008	HTML	53	5	5	38	0	0	±0.0 pp	51,395	Election

==== Lévis—Bellechasse ====
Polling Firm	Last Date of Polling	Link	Cons.	Liberal	NDP	BQ	Green	Other	Margin of Error^{[1]}	Sample Size^{[2]}	Polling Method^{[3]}
Segma Research	April 16, 2011	HTML	38	5	23	26	6	0	±5.7 pp	300	IVR
2008 Election	October 14, 2008	HTML	46	15	11	25	3	0	±0.0 pp	54,849	Election

==== Lotbinière—Chutes-de-la-Chaudière ====
Polling Firm	Last Date of Polling	Link	Cons.	Liberal	NDP	BQ	Green	Other	Margin of Error^{[1]}	Sample Size^{[2]}	Polling Method^{[3]}
Segma Research	April 16, 2011	HTML	35	12	23	29	1	0	±5.7 pp	300	IVR
2008 Election	October 14, 2008	HTML	47	13	13	25	2	0	±0.0 pp	52,732	Election

==== Louis-Hébert ====
Polling Firm	Last Date of Polling	Link	Cons.	Liberal	NDP	BQ	Green	Other	Margin of Error^{[1]}	Sample Size^{[2]}	Polling Method^{[3]}
CROP	April 27, 2011	HTML	22	13	32	30	3	0	±4.9 pp	400	IVR
2008 Election	October 14, 2008	HTML	28	24	9	36	2	0	±0.0 pp	58,529	Election

==== Louis-Saint-Laurent ====
Polling Firm	Last Date of Polling	Link	Cons.	Liberal	NDP	BQ	Green	Other	Margin of Error^{[1]}	Sample Size^{[2]}	Polling Method^{[3]}
CROP	April 27, 2011	HTML	37	8	37	17	1	0	±4.9 pp	400	IVR
2008 Election	October 14, 2008	HTML	47	13	10	27	3	0	±0.0 pp	50,966	Election

==== Portneuf—Jacques-Cartier ====
Polling Firm	Last Date of Polling	Link	Cons.	Liberal	NDP	BQ	Green	Other	Margin of Error^{[1]}	Sample Size^{[2]}	Polling Method^{[3]}
CROP	April 27, 2011	HTML	0	8	31	28	3	29	±4.9 pp	400	IVR
2008 Election	October 14, 2008	HTML	0	16	13	32	3	36	±0.0 pp	46,095	Election

==== Québec ====
Polling Firm	Last Date of Polling	Link	Cons.	Liberal	NDP	BQ	Green	Other	Margin of Error^{[1]}	Sample Size^{[2]}	Polling Method^{[3]}
CROP	April 27, 2011	HTML	15	10	34	34	6	0	±4.9 pp	400	IVR
2008 Election	October 14, 2008	HTML	26	18	12	42	3	0	±0.0 pp	51,067	Election

==== Richmond—Arthabaska ====
Polling Firm	Last Date of Polling	Link	Cons.	Liberal	NDP	BQ	Green	Other	Margin of Error^{[1]}	Sample Size^{[2]}	Polling Method^{[3]}
Cara Telecom	April 21, 2011	HTML	21	6	20	47	6	0	±4.8 pp	420	IVR
2008 Election	October 14, 2008	HTML	29	13	9	46	3	1	±0.0 pp	52,692	Election

==== Roberval—Lac-Saint-Jean ====
Polling Firm	Last Date of Polling	Link	Cons.	Liberal	NDP	BQ	Green	Other	Margin of Error^{[1]}	Sample Size^{[2]}	Polling Method^{[3]}
CROP	April 27, 2011	HTML	47	4	27	20	2	0	±4.9 pp	400	IVR
Segma Research	April 21, 2011	HTML	54	5	11	28	2	0	±4.6 pp	432	IVR
2008 Election	October 14, 2008	HTML	44	10	5	40	2	0	±0.0 pp	37,307	Election

==== Trois-Rivières ====
Polling Firm	Last Date of Polling	Link	Cons.	Liberal	NDP	BQ	Green	Other	Margin of Error^{[1]}	Sample Size^{[2]}	Polling Method^{[3]}
CROP	April 27, 2011	HTML	17	8	42	28	5	0	±4.9 pp	400	IVR
2008 Election	October 14, 2008	HTML	24	18	9	45	3	0	±0.0 pp	39,579	Election

== See also ==
- Opinion polling in the Canadian federal election, 2011

== Notes ==
Notes

^{1} In cases when linked poll details distinguish between the margin of error associated with the total sample of respondents (including undecided and non-voters) and that of the subsample of decided/leaning voters, the latter is included in the table. Also not included is the margin of error created by rounding to the nearest whole number or any margin of error from methodological sources. Most online polls—because of their opt-in method of recruiting panellists which results in a non-random sample—cannot have a margin of error. In such cases, shown is what the margin of error would be for a survey using a random probability-based sample of equivalent size.
^{2} Refers to the total sample size, including undecided and non-voters.
^{3} "Telephone" refers to traditional telephone polls conducted by live interviewers; "IVR" refers to automated Interactive Voice Response polls conducted by telephone; "online" refers to polls conducted exclusively over the internet; "telephone/online" refers to polls which combine results from both telephone and online surveys, or for which respondents are initially recruited by telephone and then asked to complete an online survey.
