= Compas (polling company) =

Canadian polling company

COMPAS is a Canadian polling company.
