= Abacus Data =

Canadian polling and market research firm

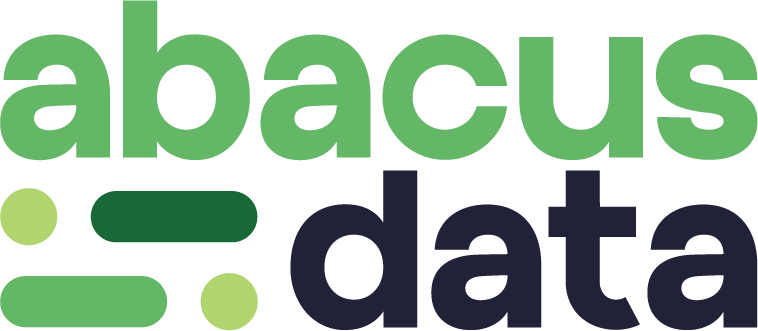
- Type: Private
- Industry: Public opinion research Strategic communications advice Human resources and organizational research Market research Generational research Public affairs Charitable giving and philanthropy Non-profits and associations
- Founded: July 2010
- Founder: David Coletto
- Headquarters: Ottawa, Ontario, Canada
- Key people: David Coletto (CEO); Ihor Korbabicz (president)
- Website: www.abacusdata.ca

Abacus Data is a Canadian polling and market research firm based in Ottawa, Ontario.

== History ==
It was founded in August 2010, soon after its founder and chairman David Coletto graduated from the University of Calgary with a PhD in political science.

The company's surveys and political opinion polls are sometimes cited in Canadian news media, including The Globe and Mail, the National Post, the Toronto Star, and Sun Media newspapers.

In 2013, Bruce Anderson joined Abacus Data as chairman. He stepped down at the end of 2022, and David Coletto took over as chairman.

During the COVID-19 pandemic, Abacus Data led the Faster Together initiative to conduct market research about vaccine hesitancy and to promote acceptance of COVID-19 vaccines.

In August 2026 Abacus Data acquired Probe Research, looking to expand their research into the Canadian Prairies.
