= Pollara =

Canadian public opinion and market research firm

Pollara Strategic Insights is a Canadian public opinion and market research firm. Founded as Insight Canada Research in 1985 by Chairman Michael Marzolini, the company name was changed in 1997 to Pollara. In 2007, the company was re-branded as Pollara Strategic Insights, although it is still commonly referred to as Pollara.

Pollara is a full-service research firm active in all sectors and disciplines. It provides custom quantitative and qualitative research as well as a suite of proprietary research models and syndicated studies.

Pollara was the pollster to the Liberal Party of Canada in its majority government winning election campaigns in 1993, 1997 and 2000.

Pollara has been frequently cited by Canadian media on the public opinions of Canadians with regard to socioeconomic, healthcare, mental health, foreign affairs and political issues for decades.

Pollara is a member of the Canadian Research Insights Council (CRIC).
