= Opinion polling for the 2025 Canadian federal election =

This table provides a list of scientific, nationwide public opinion polls conducted from the 2021 Canadian federal election leading up to the 2025 Canadian federal election.

== National polls ==
=== Campaign period ===
The campaign period for the April 28, 2025 election started after the election was called on March 23, 2025.

Evolution of voting intentions according to polls conducted during the 2025 Canadian federal election campaign period, graphed from the data in the tables below. Trendlines are 30-poll local regressions, with polls weighted by proximity in time and a logarithmic function of sample size. 95% confidence ribbons represent uncertainty about the trendlines, not the likelihood that actual election results would fall within the intervals.

Polling firm	Last date of polling (Note: Polls that share the same last date of polling are ordered from earliest (below) to latest 37 (above) first date of polling. Polls that have identical field dates are placed in the order in which they were released/published (earliest below, latest above).)	Link	CPC	LPC	NDP	BQ	PPC	GPC	Others (Note: Support for other parties may include the People's Party of Canada depending on the poll.)	Margin of error (Note: In cases when linked poll details distinguish between the margin of error associated with the total sample of respondents (including undecided and non-voters) and that of the subsample of decided/leaning voters, the former is included in the table. Also not included is the margin of error created by rounding to the nearest whole number or any margin of error from methodological sources. Most online polls (because of their opt-in method of recruiting panelists which results in a non-random sample) cannot have a margin of error. In such cases, shown is what the margin of error would be for a survey using a random probability-based sample of equivalent size.)	Sample size (Note: Refers to the total, "raw" sample size, including undecided and non-voters, and before demographic weighting is applied. Fractions in parentheses apply to rolling polls (see below) and indicate the proportion of the sample that is independent from the previous poll in the series.)	Polling method (Note: "Telephone" refers to traditional telephone polls conducted by live interviewers; "IVR" refers to automated Interactive Voice Response polls conducted by telephone; "online" refers to polls conducted exclusively over the internet; "telephone/online" refers to polls which combine results from both telephone and online surveys, or for which respondents are initially recruited by telephone and then asked to complete an online survey. "Rolling" polls contain overlapping data from one poll to the next.)	Lead
2025 election	April 28, 2025		41.3	43.8	6.3	6.3	0.7	1.2	0.4	—N/a	19,597,674	—N/a	2.5
Liaison Strategies	April 27, 2025		41	43	7	6	1	1	1	±3.09 pp	1,000	IVR	2
Forum Research	April 27, 2025		39	43	8	6	1	2	1	±4.0 pp	1,153	IVR	4
Nanos Research	April 27, 2025		39.9	42.6	7.8	6.4	1.1	1.9	—N/a	±3.4 pp	863	telephone	2.7
Research Co.	April 27, 2025		39	44	7	6	1	2	1	±3.1 pp	1,019	online	5
Mainstreet Research	April 27, 2025		41	44	6	6	1	1	1	±2.2 pp	2,000 (1/3)	IVR (rolling)	3
Abacus Data	April 27, 2025		39	41	10	6	3	1	0	±2.0 pp	2,500	online	2
Ekos	April 27, 2025		37.5	43.6	9.2	4.4	2	2	1	±2.3 pp	1,805 (0.01/1)	telephone/online	6.1
Pallas Data	April 26, 2025		38.8	43.2	7.3	6.4	0.9	2.3	1.0	±2.7 pp	1,294	IVR	4.4
Liaison Strategies	April 26, 2025		41	44	6	6	1	1	1	±2.53 pp	1,500 (1/3)	IVR (rolling)	3
Nanos Research	April 26, 2025		38.9	43.0	8.0	6.1	1.1	2.8	0.1	±2.4 pp	1,698 (1/2)	telephone (rolling)	4.1
Mainstreet Research	April 26, 2025		43	44	5	5	1	1	1	±2.4 pp	1,669 (1/3)	IVR (rolling)	1
Innovative Research	April 26, 2025		37	41	11	6	2	3	0	—N/a	1,587	online	4
MQO Research	April 26, 2025		38	43	10	5	1	3	0	±2.1 pp	2,236	online	5
Angus Reid	April 26, 2025		40	44	6	7	—N/a	1	1	±2 pp	2,820	online	4
Ekos	April 26, 2025		38.1	43.5	8.5	4.6	1.8	2.1	1.4	±2.2 pp	1,918	IVR	5.4
Ipsos	April 26, 2025		38	42	9	6	1	2	1	±2.4 pp	2,500	telephone/online	4
Liaison Strategies	April 25, 2025		40	44	7	6	1	2	1	±2.53 pp	1,500 (1/3)	IVR (rolling)	4
Mainstreet Research	April 25, 2025		40	45	7	6	1	1	1	±2.6 pp	1,405 (1/3)	IVR (rolling)	5
Nanos Research	April 25, 2025		38.6	41.9	9.4	6.0	1.3	2.9	0.0	±2.7 pp	1,291 (1/3)	telephone (rolling)	3.3
Leger	April 25, 2025		39	43	8	6	1	2	1	±2.53 pp	1,502 (4/5)	online	4
YouGov (MRP)	April 25, 2025		39	42	10	5	2	2	1	—N/a	5,964 (3/20)	—N/a	3
Pollara	April 24, 2025		38	41	10	6	2	2	1	±2.0 pp	2,382	telephone/online	3
Liaison Strategies	April 24, 2025		39	44	8	6	1	2	1	±2.53 pp	1,500 (1/3)	IVR (rolling)	5
Nanos Research	April 24, 2025		38.4	42.7	8.3	5.9	1.4	3.2	0.0	±2.7 pp	1,302 (1/3)	telephone (rolling)	4.3
Mainstreet Research	April 24, 2025		41	43	7	6	1	1	1	±2.7 pp	1,365 (1/3)	IVR (rolling)	2
Liaison Strategies	April 23, 2025		38	43	8	6	1	2	1	±2.53 pp	1,500 (1/3)	IVR (rolling)	5
Nanos Research	April 23, 2025		39.3	42.9	7.2	6.0	1.4	3.0	0.1	±2.7 pp	1,307 (1/3)	telephone (rolling)	3.6
Mainstreet Research	April 23, 2025		40	43	9	5	1	2	1	±2.6 pp	1,425 (1/3)	IVR (rolling)	3
Innovative Research	April 23, 2025		38	38	12	7	—N/a	3	2	—N/a	1,584	online	0
Focaldata	April 23, 2025		37.5	40.5	10.7	6.5	2.4	2.1	0.2	—N/a	2,826	online	3.0
Cardinal Research	April 23, 2025		39	44	7	7	—N/a	2	1	±2 pp	4,057	IVR	5
Liaison Strategies	April 22, 2025		39	42	8	6	1	2	1	±2.53 pp	1,500 (1/3)	IVR (rolling)	3
Nanos Research	April 22, 2025		38.5	44.1	7.7	5.4	0.9	3.4	0.1	±2.7 pp	1,313 (1/3)	telephone (rolling)	5.6
Mainstreet Research	April 22, 2025		41	42	6	6	2	2	2	±2.6 pp	1,410 (1/3)	IVR (rolling)	1
YouGov (MRP)	April 22, 2025		38	42	10	6	2	2	1	—N/a	6,077	—N/a	4
Pallas Data	April 21, 2025		37.9	42.5	8.5	5.5	2.1	2.5	1.0	±2.7 pp	1,306	IVR	4.6
Liaison Strategies	April 21, 2025		37	43	9	6	2	2	1	±2.53 pp	1,500 (1/3)	IVR (rolling)	6
Nanos Research	April 21, 2025		37.1	42.6	10.4	5.9	0.8	3.1	0.1	±2.7 pp	1,308 (1/3)	telephone (rolling)	5.5
Mainstreet Research	April 21, 2025		40	40	7	6	2	2	1	±2.5 pp	1,485 (1/3)	IVR (rolling)	0
Abacus Data	April 21, 2025		37	40	11	7	2	2	0	±2.3 pp	2,000	online	3
Leger	April 21, 2025		39	43	8	6	2	2	1	±2.45 pp	1,603	online	4
Innovative Research	April 21, 2025		41	36	11	7	—N/a	3	3	—N/a	1,305 (0.3/1)	online	5
Angus Reid	April 21, 2025		39	44	7	7	—N/a	2	1	±1.5 pp	2,459	online	5
Research Co.	April 20, 2025		38	43	8	6	1	2	1	±3.1 pp	1,006	online	5
Liaison Strategies	April 20, 2025		37	43	9	6	2	2	1	±2.53 pp	1,500 (1/3)	IVR (rolling)	6
Mainstreet Research	April 20, 2025		41	41	6	6	2	2	2	±2.7 pp	1,295 (1/3)	IVR (rolling)	0
Nanos Research	April 20, 2025		36.3	43.7	10.7	5.6	0.8	2.9	0.1	±2.7 pp	1,289 (1/3)	telephone (rolling)	7.4
Ekos	April 20, 2025		40.7	43.4	6.8	4.2	1.3	2.2	1.3	±2.5 pp	1,672 (4/5)	IVR (rolling)	2.7
Innovative Research	April 20, 2025		38	39	11	7	—N/a	3	3	—N/a	2,311	online	1
Kolosowski Strategies	April 19, 2025		42	42	6	6	1	2	1	±3 pp	1,237	online	0
Ipsos	April 19, 2025		38	41	12	5	2	2	0	±3.8 pp	1,001	online	3
MQO Research	April 19, 2025		36	44	10	5	3	3	0	±2 pp	2,383	online	8
Liaison Strategies	April 19, 2025		38	43	8	6	2	1	1	±2.53 pp	1,500 (1/3)	IVR (rolling)	5
Mainstreet Research	April 19, 2025		43	39	6	6	3	2	1	±2.7 pp	1,307 (1/3)	IVR (rolling)	4
Nanos Research	April 19, 2025		37.0	43.2	10.5	5.8	0.8	2.7	0.1	±2.7 pp	1,293 (1/3)	telephone (rolling)	6.2
Pollara	April 19, 2025		36	44	8	7	2	2	1	±2.1 pp	2,195	telephone/online	8
Liaison Strategies	April 18, 2025		39	44	7	6	1	1	1	±2.53 pp	1,500 (1/3)	IVR (rolling)	5
Mainstreet Research	April 18, 2025		43	41	5	5	3	2	1	±2.9 pp	1,124 (1/3)	IVR (rolling)	2
	April 17, 2025	Leaders' Debates Commission English debate											
Liaison Strategies	April 17, 2025		39	44	7	6	2	1	1	±2.53 pp	1,500 (1/3)	IVR (rolling)	5
Nanos Research	April 17, 2025		37.1	45.4	8.3	5.6	0.7	2.9	0.1	±2.7 pp	1,316 (1/3)	telephone (rolling)	8.3
Mainstreet Research	April 17, 2025		41	42	7	6	2	2	1	±2.7 pp	1,332 (1/3)	IVR (rolling)	1
	April 16, 2025	Leaders' Debates Commission French debate											
Ekos	April 16, 2025		34.8	44.5	10.1	4.5	2.4	3.4	0.4	±2.8 pp	1,210 (0.01/1)	telephone/online	9.7
JL Partners	April 16, 2025		37	39	10	7	3	2	0	±3.4 pp	1,000	online	2
Liaison Strategies	April 16, 2025		41	44	6	6	2	1	1	±2.53 pp	1,500 (1/3)	IVR (rolling)	3
Nanos Research	April 16, 2025		38.8	43.5	8.7	5.6	0.9	2.3	0.1	±2.7 pp	1,351 (1/3)	telephone (rolling)	4.7
Mainstreet Research	April 16, 2025		40	44	7	5	2	2	1	±2.7 pp	1,326 (1/3)	IVR (rolling)	4
Ekos	April 16, 2025		36.3	45.7	8.8	4.3	1.3	2.8	0.9	±2.3 pp	1,782	IVR	9.4
Abacus Data	April 15, 2025		38	40	11	7	2	2	0	±2.9 pp	1,200	online	2
Liaison Strategies	April 15, 2025		39	46	5	5	2	2	1	±2.53 pp	1,500 (1/3)	IVR (rolling)	7
Nanos Research	April 15, 2025		37.3	44.7	8.3	6.2	1.1	2.2	0.1	±2.7 pp	1,359 (1/3)	telephone (rolling)	7.4
Mainstreet Research	April 15, 2025		42	44	6	4	1	2	1	±2.6 pp	1,376 (1/3)	IVR (rolling)	2
Liaison Strategies	April 14, 2025		39	44	6	5	2	2	1	±2.53 pp	1,500 (1/3)	IVR (rolling)	5
Nanos Research	April 14, 2025		38.8	44.1	8.8	5.5	1.5	1.3	0.1	±2.7 pp	1,367 (1/3)	telephone (rolling)	5.3
Mainstreet Research	April 14, 2025		43	44	5	4	1	2	1	±2.6 pp	1,378 (1/3)	IVR (rolling)	1
Leger	April 14, 2025		38	43	8	6	2	3	1	±1.79 pp	3,005	online	5
Innovative Research	April 14, 2025		35	40	12	6	—N/a	4	3	—N/a	1,455	online	5
Liaison Strategies	April 13, 2025		38	44	7	6	2	3	1	±2.53 pp	1,500 (1/3)	IVR (rolling)	6
Nanos Research	April 13, 2025		37.8	44.8	8.8	5.5	1.1	1.9	0.2	±2.7 pp	1,345 (1/3)	telephone (rolling)	7.0
Mainstreet Research	April 13, 2025		44	42	6	4	1	2	1	±2.6 pp	1,388 (1/3)	text/online (rolling)	2
Angus Reid	April 13, 2025		39	45	7	7	1	1	1	±2 pp	2,216	online	6
Pollara	April 13, 2025		36	44	9	5	3	2	1	±2.1 pp	2,166	telephone/online	8
Pallas Data	April 12, 2025		36.8	45.1	8.8	5.7	1.7	1.1	0.8	±2.7 pp	1,282	IVR	8.3
MQO Research	April 12, 2025		35	44	12	4	1	4	0	±2.3 pp	2,445	online	9
Liaison Strategies	April 12, 2025		37	45	7	6	2	3	1	±2.53 pp	1,500 (1/3)	IVR (rolling)	8
Nanos Research	April 12, 2025		38.6	44.3	8.5	5.2	1.1	2.0	0.3	±2.7 pp	1,300 (1/3)	telephone (rolling)	5.7
Mainstreet Research	April 12, 2025		43	44	6	4	2	1	0	±2.6 pp	1,370 (1/3)	text/online (rolling)	1
Liaison Strategies	April 11, 2025		39	46	6	5	1	2	1	±2.53 pp	1,500 (1/3)	IVR (rolling)	7
Nanos Research	April 11, 2025		37.1	43.3	9.5	5.8	1.1	2.8	0.5	±2.8 pp	1,250 (1/3)	telephone (rolling)	6.2
Mainstreet Research	April 11, 2025		40	45	7	4	2	2	1	±2.6 pp	1,445 (1/3)	text/online (rolling)	5
Ipsos	April 10, 2025		36	42	11	6	1	2	1	±3.8 pp	1,000	online	6
Liaison Strategies	April 10, 2025		39	44	8	5	1	2	1	±2.53 pp	1,500 (1/3)	IVR (rolling)	5
Nanos Research	April 10, 2025		37.8	43.6	8.7	5.6	1.7	2.4	0.3	±2.8 pp	1,233 (1/3)	telephone (rolling)	5.8
Mainstreet Research	April 10, 2025		40	45	6	5	2	2	1	±2.5 pp	1,548 (1/3)	text/online (rolling)	5
Abacus Data	April 10, 2025		38	42	9	6	2	2	1	±2.31 pp	1,800 (1/2)	online	4
Ekos	April 10, 2025		36.3	49.3	6.7	3.8	0.9	2.0	1.1	±2.2 pp	1,995	IVR	13.0
Deltapoll	April 9, 2025		37	41	9	7	2	3	0	—N/a	1,005	online	4
Liaison Strategies	April 9, 2025		40	43	8	5	1	2	1	±2.53 pp	1,500 (1/3)	IVR (rolling)	3
Nanos Research	April 9, 2025		38.1	43.0	8.9	5.7	1.5	2.6	0.3	±2.8 pp	1,238 (1/3)	telephone (rolling)	4.9
Mainstreet Research	April 9, 2025		39	46	6	4	2	1	2	±2.5 pp	1,500 (1/3)	text/online (rolling)	7
Liaison Strategies	April 8, 2025		38	45	8	5	1	2	1	±2.53 pp	1,500 (1/3)	IVR (rolling)	7
Nanos Research	April 8, 2025		38.6	42.8	8.5	6.2	1.3	2.3	0.3	±2.8 pp	1,239 (1/3)	telephone (rolling)	4.2
Mainstreet Research	April 8, 2025		41	44	6	4	2	1	2	±2.7 pp	1,289 (1/3)	text/online (rolling)	3
Abacus Data	April 8, 2025		36	42	11	5	3	2	0	±2.1 pp	1,900	online	6
Liaison Strategies	April 7, 2025		39	45	7	4	1	2	1	±2.53 pp	1,500 (1/3)	IVR (rolling)	6
Nanos Research	April 7, 2025		38.1	42.7	8.1	6.6	1.4	2.8	0.4	±2.8 pp	1,256 (1/3)	telephone (rolling)	4.6
Mainstreet Research	April 7, 2025		40	45	8	2	1	1	2	±2.9 pp	1,148 (1/3)	text/online (rolling)	5
Angus Reid	April 7, 2025		36	46	7	7	1	2	1	±2 pp	2,184	online	10
Innovative Research	April 7, 2025		35	41	12	6	—N/a	3	3	—N/a	1,341	online	6
Empirical Intelligence	April 7, 2025		36	44	12	5	—N/a	3	1	±3.4 pp	1,001	online	8
Research Co.	April 6, 2025		36	44	8	5	2	3	1	±3.1 pp	1,007	online	8
Leger	April 6, 2025		37	44	8	5	1	3	1	±2.43 pp	1,631	online	7
Liaison Strategies	April 6, 2025		39	45	7	4	2	2	1	±2.53 pp	1,500 (1/3)	IVR (rolling)	6
Nanos Research	April 6, 2025		37.7	42.8	7.9	6.7	1.6	2.8	0.4	±2.8 pp	1,264 (1/3)	telephone (rolling)	5.1
Mainstreet Research	April 6, 2025		40	44	8	3	3	2	1	±2.8 pp	1,240 (1/3)	text/online (rolling)	4
MQO Research	April 6, 2025		34	44	11	5	2	4	0	±2.5 pp	1,859	online	10
Pollara	April 6, 2025		36	44	9	6	2	2	1	±2.1 pp	2,132	telephone/online	8
Pallas Data	April 5, 2025		37.8	44.4	8.0	5.9	1.1	1.7	1.0	±2.7 pp	1,320	IVR	6.6
Liaison Strategies	April 5, 2025		39	44	7	4	2	2	2	±2.53 pp	1,500 (1/3)	IVR (rolling)	5
Nanos Research	April 5, 2025		37.0	43.4	8.2	6.0	1.9	3.3	0.2	±2.8 pp	1,270 (1/3)	telephone (rolling)	6.4
Mainstreet Research	April 5, 2025		40	42	8	4	2	2	1	±2.6 pp	1,388 (1/3)	text/online (rolling)	2
Kolosowski Strategies	April 4, 2025		41	39	11	6	1	2	0	±3 pp	1,448	online	2
Liaison Strategies	April 4, 2025		38	46	6	4	2	2	2	±2.53 pp	1,500 (1/3)	IVR (rolling)	8
Nanos Research	April 4, 2025		34.9	45.9	9.2	5.2	1.4	2.9	0.5	±2.8 pp	1,248 (1/3)	telephone (rolling)	11.0
Mainstreet Research	April 4, 2025		40	43	6	6	2	1	1	±2.4 pp	1,625 (1/3)	text/online (rolling)	3
Ipsos	April 3, 2025		34	46	10	6	1	3	0	±3.8 pp	1,000	online	12
Liaison Strategies	April 3, 2025		38	46	6	4	3	2	1	±2.53 pp	1,500 (1/3)	IVR (rolling)	8
Nanos Research	April 3, 2025		35.9	45.5	9.4	5.2	1.4	2.2	0.4	±2.8 pp	1,241 (1/3)	telephone (rolling)	9.6
Mainstreet Research	April 3, 2025		40	43	7	6	2	1	1	±2.4 pp	1,665 (1/3)	text/online (rolling)	3
Abacus Data	April 3, 2025		39	39	11	6	2	3	0	±2.3 pp	1,800	online	0
Ekos	April 3, 2025		34.4	49.0	7.0	4.5	1.2	2.8	1.2	±2.45 pp	1,685 (4/5)	IVR (rolling)	14.6
Liaison Strategies	April 2, 2025		37	45	6	5	3	2	1	±2.53 pp	1,500 (1/3)		8
Nanos Research	April 2, 2025		36.7	45.8	8.8	5.5	1.1	1.7	0.3	±2.8 pp	1,248 (1/3)	telephone (rolling)	9.1
Mainstreet Research	April 2, 2025		40	44	7	6	2	1	0	±2.3 pp	1,756 (1/3)	text/online (rolling)	4
Ekos	April 2, 2025		32.7	47.1	10.2	4.4	2.8	2.1	0.7	±2.59 pp	1,513 (0.01/1)	telephone/online	14.4
Liaison Strategies	April 1, 2025		39	44	6	5	3	2	1	±2.53 pp	1,500 (1/3)	IVR (rolling)	5
Nanos Research	April 1, 2025		37.2	45.1	9.2	5.3	1.1	1.6	0.4	±2.8 pp	1,256 (1/3)	telephone (rolling)	7.9
Mainstreet Research	April 1, 2025		40	43	9	5	2	1	0	±2.4 pp	1,651 (1/3)	text/online (rolling)	3
Pallas Data	March 31, 2025		35.7	44.6	8.5	5.6	2.2	2.8	0.6	±2.8 pp	1,267	IVR	8.9
Liaison Strategies	March 31, 2025		38	44	6	5	3	2	1	±2.53 pp	1,500 (1/3)	IVR (rolling)	6
Nanos Research	March 31, 2025		36.6	44.7	10.1	5.6	1.3	1.6	0.3	±2.8 pp	1,262 (1/3)	telephone (rolling)	8.1
Mainstreet Research	March 31, 2025		41	44	7	5	2	1	0	±2.4 pp	1,628 (1/3)	text/online (rolling)	3
Angus Reid	March 31, 2025		38	46	7	7	1	1	1	±2 pp	2,131	online	8
Innovative Research	March 31, 2025		38	37	12	6	2	3	1	—N/a	1,742	online	1
Leger	March 31, 2025		38	44	7	5	2	3	1	±1.79 pp	3,002	online	6
Liaison Strategies	March 30, 2025		38	43	7	5	3	2	1	±2.53 pp	1,500 (1/3)	IVR (rolling)	5
Nanos Research	March 30, 2025		36.1	43.6	10.5	5.3	1.9	2.4	0.2	±2.8 pp	1,264 (1/3)	telephone (rolling)	7.5
Mainstreet Research	March 30, 2025		40	43	6	5	3	2	1	±2.5 pp	1,589 (1/3)	text/online (rolling)	3
Ekos	March 30, 2025		35.6	47.5	6.3	4.8	2.1	2.4	1.3	±2.5 pp	1,517	IVR	11.9
Pollara	March 30, 2025		35	44	10	5	2	3	1	—N/a	1,734	telephone/online	9
Liaison Strategies	March 29, 2025		38	42	7	6	3	3	1	±2.53 pp	1,500 (1/3)	IVR (rolling)	4
Nanos Research	March 29, 2025		37.0	41.9	10.6	5.3	1.9	2.6	0.7	±2.7 pp	1,285	telephone	4.9
Mainstreet Research	March 29, 2025		40	42	7	5	3	2	1	±2.4 pp	1,704 (1/3)	text/online (rolling)	2
MQO Research	March 29, 2025		34	45	11	4	2	4	1	±2.4 pp	1,938	online	11
Liaison Strategies	March 28, 2025		36	44	8	6	2	3	1	±2.53 pp	1,500 (1/3)	IVR (rolling)	8
Mainstreet Research	March 28, 2025		40	43	6	5	2	2	1	±2.4 pp	1,621 (1/3)	text/online (rolling)	3
Liaison Strategies	March 27, 2025		38	43	7	6	2	2	1	±2.53 pp	1,500 (1/3)	IVR (rolling)	5
Mainstreet Research	March 27, 2025		41	44	7	5	1	2	1	±2.4 pp	1,657 (1/3)	text/online (rolling)	3
Abacus Data	March 27, 2025		39	39	11	5	3	3	0	±2.3 pp	1,800 (1/2)	online	0
Ipsos	March 26, 2025		38	44	9	5	1	2	1	±3.1 pp	1,500	telephone/online	6
Liaison Strategies	March 26, 2025		37	44	6	6	3	2	1	±2.53 pp	1,500 (1/3)	IVR (rolling)	7
Mainstreet Research	March 26, 2025		41	45	6	5	1	1	1	±2.6 pp	1,380 (1/3)	text/online (rolling)	4
Liaison Strategies	March 25, 2025		38	42	7	6	3	2	1	±2.53 pp	1,500 (1/3)	IVR (rolling)	4
Mainstreet Research	March 25, 2025		40	44	7	5	1	2	1	±2.8 pp	1,230 (1/3)	text/online (rolling)	4
Ekos	March 25, 2025		34.6	49.6	7.2	3.9	1.5	1.6	1.6	±2.4 pp	1,621	IVR	15.0
Abacus Data	March 25, 2025		37	38	11	6	3	4	1	±2.2 pp	2,000	online	1
Research Co.	March 24, 2025		37	41	9	7	2	3	1	±3.1 pp	1,003	online	4
Liaison Strategies	March 24, 2025		37	42	7	6	4	3	1	±2.53 pp	1,500 (1/3)	IVR (rolling)	5
Mainstreet Research	March 24, 2025		39	44	7	6	2	2	1	±2.3 pp	1,745 (1/3)	text/online (rolling)	5
Angus Reid	March 24, 2025		38	46	7	6	1	1	0	±2 pp	2,400	online	8

=== Pre-campaign period ===
Evolution of voting intentions according to polls conducted during the pre-campaign period of the 45th Canadian federal election, graphed from the data in the table below. Trendlines are 30-poll local regressions, with polls weighted by proximity in time and a logarithmic function of sample size. 95% confidence ribbons represent uncertainty about the trendlines, not the likelihood that actual election results would fall within the intervals.

Polling firm	Last date of polling	Link	CPC	LPC	NDP	BQ	PPC	GPC	Others	Margin of error	Sample size	Polling method	Lead
	March 23, 2025	A snap election is called for April 28, 2025.											
Leger	March 23, 2025		38	44	6	5	3	3	1	±2.45 pp	1,599	online	6
Liaison Strategies	March 23, 2025		36	40	9	6	3	4	2	±2.53 pp	1,500 (1/3)	IVR (rolling)	4
Mainstreet Research	March 23, 2025		38	44	7	6	3	1	1	±2.4 pp	1,661	text/online	6
Pallas Data	March 22, 2025		37.8	42.3	8.4	7.0	2.1	2.2	0.4	±2.8 pp	1,225	IVR	4.5
Liaison Strategies	March 22, 2025		37	39	9	6	3	4	2	±2.53 pp	1,500 (1/3)	IVR (rolling)	2
Liaison Strategies	March 21, 2025		36	38	10	6	3	4	2	±2.53 pp	1,500 (1/3)	IVR (rolling)	2
Innovative Research	March 21, 2025		34	36	13	7	—N/a	5	4	—N/a	1,548	online	2
Nanos Research	March 21, 2025		36.5	34.1	14.0	7.6	2.1	4.3	—N/a	±3.0 pp	1,100 (1/4)	telephone (rolling)	2.4
Liaison Strategies	March 20, 2025		36	38	11	7	3	4	2	±2.53 pp	1,500 (1/3)	IVR (rolling)	2
Abacus Data	March 20, 2025		39	36	12	6	2	4	0	±2.5 pp	1,500	online	3
Liaison Strategies	March 19, 2025		36	40	9	6	3	4	2	±2.53 pp	1,500 (1/3)	IVR (rolling)	4
Liaison Strategies	March 18, 2025		36	40	10	6	2	4	2	±2.53 pp	1,500 (1/3)	IVR (rolling)	4
Liaison Strategies	March 17, 2025		36	39	10	6	2	4	2	±2.53 pp	1,500 (1/3)	IVR (rolling)	3
Ipsos	March 17, 2025		36	42	10	6	3	2	2	±3.8 pp	1,000	online	6
Leger	March 16, 2025		39	42	9	5	2	3	0	±2.47 pp	1,568	online	3
Liaison Strategies	March 16, 2025		35	37	12	7	2	5	2	±2.53 pp	1,500 (1/3)	IVR (rolling)	2
Angus Reid	March 16, 2025		37	42	9	8	1	2	1	±1.5 pp	4,009	online	5
Liaison Strategies	March 15, 2025		35	38	12	6	2	5	2	±2.53 pp	1,500 (1/3)	IVR (rolling)	3
	March 14, 2025	Mark Carney is sworn in as the prime minister of Canada.											
Liaison Strategies	March 14, 2025		35	39	12	5	2	5	2	±2.53 pp	1,500 (1/3)	IVR (rolling)	4
Nanos Research	March 14, 2025		35.3	34.1	16.0	7.9	1.9	3.8	—N/a	±3.0 pp	1,074 (1/4)	telephone (rolling)	1.2
Innovative Research	March 13, 2025		39	33	13	7	3	4	0	—N/a	1,558	online	6
Liaison Strategies	March 13, 2025		34	38	13	6	2	6	2	±2.53 pp	1,501	IVR	4
Leger	March 13, 2025		37	40	12	6	2	2	1	±2.49 pp	1,504	online	3
Ekos	March 13, 2025		31.8	49.5	8.0	5.0	2.5	2.0	1.1	±3.1 pp	1,025	IVR	17.7
Mainstreet Research	March 13, 2025		39	41	8	6	3	2	2	±3.1 pp	1,016	text/online	2
Abacus Data	March 12, 2025		38	34	15	7	2	4	1	±2.4 pp	1,700	online	4
Ekos	March 11, 2025		33.3	42.3	12.8	4.2	4.0	2.9	0.5	±2.5 pp	1,524	telephone/online	9.0
Leger	March 10, 2025		37	37	11	6	2	5	2	±2.49 pp	1,548	online	0
	March 9, 2025	Mark Carney is elected leader of the Liberal Party.											
Innovative Research	March 9, 2025		41	31	14	6	3	4	1	—N/a	1,695	online	10
Nanos Research	March 7, 2025		35.7	34.7	14.9	7.9	2.1	3.8	—N/a	±3.0 pp	1,052 (1/4)	telephone (rolling)	1.0
Ekos	March 5, 2025		35.5	40.7	12.8	5.3	1.3	3.2	1.3	±2.29 pp	1,980	IVR	5.2
Leger	March 2, 2025		43	30	13	6	2	4	2	±2.49 pp	1,548	online	13
Innovative Research	February 28, 2025		38	31	16	6	3	5	1	—N/a	1,488	online	7
Nanos Research	February 28, 2025		36.5	34.3	15.3	7.7	2.1	3.7	—N/a	±3.1 pp	1,024 (1/4)	telephone (rolling)	2.2
Abacus Data	February 25, 2025		41	29	14	6	3	4	1	±1.8 pp	1,500	online	12
Ipsos	February 24, 2025		36	38	12	6	3	4	1	±3.8 pp	1,000	online	2
Innovative Research	February 24, 2025		39	30	16	6	2	6	0	—N/a	1,789	online	9
Ekos	February 24, 2025		37.0	38.4	11.8	4.2	3.1	4.2	1.4	±2.8 pp	1,239	IVR	1.4
Pollara	February 24, 2025		42	32	11	8	2	4	0	±2.5 pp	1,506	online	10
Leger	February 23, 2025		38	35	14	7	2	4	1	±2.50 pp	1,534	online	3
Nanos Research	February 21, 2025		36.9	33.3	16.0	7.9	1.9	3.5	—N/a	±3.1 pp	1,026 (1/4)	telephone (rolling)	3.6
Leger	February 17, 2025		41	33	11	6	3	3	1	±2.49 pp	1,550	online	8
Innovative Research	February 17, 2025		40	27	16	9	3	4	0	—N/a	2,015	online	13
Nanos Research	February 14, 2025		38.6	31.5	14.9	8.0	2.1	4.4	—N/a	±3.1 pp	1,018 (1/4)	telephone (rolling)	7.1
Mainstreet Research	February 13, 2025		39	36	11	10	2	2	1	±2.9 pp	1,128	text/online	3
Ekos	February 13, 2025		38.8	33.8	15.0	5.0	2.8	3.5	1.1	±2.6 pp	1,468	IVR	5.0
Abacus Data	February 12, 2025		45	25	17	8	3	4	0	—N/a	1,000	online	20
Abacus Data	February 11, 2025		46	27	15	7	3	3	1	—N/a	1,000	online	19
Leger	February 10, 2025		40	31	14	7	2	6	2	±2.46 pp	1,590	online	9
Innovative Research	February 7, 2025		40	27	16	7	3	6	0	—N/a	1,795	online	13
Nanos Research	February 7, 2025		38.3	30.1	16.4	7.8	2.0	4.8	—N/a	±3.1 pp	1,005 (1/4)	telephone (rolling)	8.2
Pallas Data	February 6, 2025		39.6	33.7	11.9	7.2	3.3	2.5	1.8	±2.8 pp	1,241	IVR	5.9
	February 4, 2025	The Green Party concludes its co-leadership vote, with Elizabeth May and Jonathan Pedneault re-elected as co-leaders.											
Ipsos	February 3, 2025		41	28	16	9	3	3	0	±3.8 pp	1,000	online	13
Nanos Research	January 31, 2025		41.6	26.2	17.3	7.3	1.9	5.5	—N/a	±3.1 pp	1,025 (1/4)	telephone (rolling)	15.4
Ekos	January 29, 2025		33.9	32.0	18.0	7.6	3.4	4.9	0.2	±3.1 pp	1,025	telephone/online	1.9
Ekos	January 27, 2025		35.7	32.7	13.1	7.1	4.7	4.9	1.9	±2.6 pp	1,448	IVR	3.0
Leger	January 26, 2025		43	25	16	9	2	4	1	±2.51 pp	1,527	online	18
Abacus Data	January 26, 2025		43	22	18	9	3	5	0	±2.2 pp	2,205	online	21
Nanos Research	January 24, 2025		42.0	24.9	18.0	7.4	1.8	5.6	—N/a	±3.1 pp	1,023 (1/4)	telephone (rolling)	17.1
Ekos	January 21, 2025		38.5	31.7	14.2	7.1	3.1	3.2	2.1	±3.1 pp	1,018	IVR	6.8
Nanos Research	January 17, 2025		45.2	20.8	18.7	7.7	1.9	5.3	—N/a	±3.1 pp	1,040 (1/4)	telephone (rolling)	24.4
Ekos	January 16, 2025		39.0	28.0	17.4	7.4	2.5	4.5	1.2	±3.0 pp	1,036	IVR	11.0
Mainstreet Research	January 15, 2025		45	26	13	8	3	4	2	±2.1 pp	2,205	text/online	19
Abacus Data	January 14, 2025		46	20	19	8	3	4	0	±2.3 pp	1,500	online	26
Leger	January 13, 2025		47	21	17	8	2	4	1	±2.49 pp	1,545	online	26
Nanos Research	January 10, 2025		47.0	19.6	17.9	7.7	2.0	5.2	—N/a	±3.1 pp	1,001 (1/4)	telephone (rolling)	27.4
Relay Strategies	January 8, 2025		45	21	16	9	4	4	—N/a	±3 pp	1,270	online	24
Ekos	January 8, 2025		41.6	25.8	16.7	6.8	2.5	4.8	1.9	±3.2 pp	953	IVR	15.8
Abacus Data	January 7, 2025		47	20	18	8	3	3	0	±2.0 pp	2,500	online	27
Ipsos	January 7, 2025		46	20	17	9	4	2	2	±3.8 pp	1,000	online	26
Pallas Data	January 6, 2025		42.0	25.3	17.6	8.6	1.3	3.5	1.7	±2.7 pp	1,328	IVR	16.7
	January 6, 2025	Justin Trudeau announces his resignation as leader of the Liberal Party and Prime Minister, triggering a leadership election.											
Research Co.	January 5, 2025		47	21	15	10	2	3	1	±3.1 pp	1,002	online	26
Nanos Research	January 3, 2025		45.2	22.5	16.4	7.7	2.8	5.0	—N/a	±3.1 pp	1,021 (1/4)	telephone (rolling)	22.7
Angus Reid	December 30, 2024		45	16	21	11	1	3	2	±2 pp	2,261	online	24
Innovative Research	December 30, 2024		43	22	19	8	3	4	—N/a	—N/a	1,016	online	21
Nanos Research	December 27, 2024		46.6	21.3	16.6	7.6	2.7	5.0	—N/a	±3.1 pp	1,014 (1/4)	telephone (rolling)	25.3
Leger	December 22, 2024		43	20	19	9	3	5	1	±2.51 pp	1,521	online	23
Ipsos	December 20, 2024		45	20	20	7	3	3	2	±3.8 pp	1,001	online	25
Nanos Research	December 20, 2024		43.7	23.8	18.2	6.8	2.6	4.5	—N/a	±3.1 pp	1,032 (1/4)	telephone (rolling)	19.9
Ekos	December 19, 2024		44.4	19.4	18.2	8.5	2.0	4.5	2.9	±3.0 pp	1,061	IVR	25.0
Mainstreet Research	December 18, 2024		48	19	15	8	4	4	2	±2.8 pp	1,227	text/online	29
Abacus Data	December 17, 2024		45	20	18	8	4	4	1	±2.9 pp	1,186	online	25
	December 16, 2024	A federal by-election is held in Cloverdale—Langley City. Conservative Tamara Jansen flips the seat from the Liberal Party.											
Abacus Data	December 16, 2024		44	21	19	7	3	4	1	—N/a	2,595	online	23
Innovative Research	December 15, 2024		42	26	16	8	3	5	—N/a	—N/a	984	online	16
Ekos	December 15, 2024		42	24	19	7	2	5	2	±2.4 pp	1,705	IVR	18
Nanos Research	December 13, 2024		43.3	23.2	20.0	5.9	2.8	4.3	—N/a	±3.1 pp	1,031 (1/4)	telephone (rolling)	20.1
Ipsos	December 10, 2024		44	21	21	7	3	2	2	±3.8 pp	1,001	online	23
Relay Strategies	December 7, 2024		44	21	18	8	4	5	—N/a	±3 pp	1,270	online	23
Nanos Research	December 6, 2024		42.1	23.1	21.2	5.7	2.6	4.8	—N/a	±3.0 pp	1,058 (1/4)	telephone (rolling)	19.0
Angus Reid	December 5, 2024		43	21	20	11	1	4	1	±1.5 pp	4,004	online	22
Abacus Data	December 4, 2024		44	21	20	7	2	5	0	±1.9 pp	2,720	online	23
Leger	December 1, 2024		43	21	19	8	2	5	1	±2.5 pp	1,532	online	22
Nanos Research	November 29, 2024		42.0	23.4	20.6	6.8	2.3	4.4	—N/a	±3.0 pp	1,042 (1/4)	telephone (rolling)	18.6
Ekos	November 28, 2024		39.7	25.5	16.8	6.5	3.4	5.8	2.3	±2.0 pp	2,387 (17/23)	IVR (rolling)	14.2
Mainstreet Research	November 24, 2024		47	17	17	7	4	6	2	±3 pp	1,097	text/online	30
Nanos Research	November 22, 2024		41.4	23.0	20.3	7.3	2.0	5.8	—N/a	±3.1 pp	1,003 (1/4)	telephone (rolling)	18.4
Abacus Data	November 19, 2024		43	21	21	8	3	4	1	±2.3 pp	1,915	online	22
Nanos Research	November 15, 2024		40.3	25.1	19.5	7.8	1.6	5.7	—N/a	±3.0 pp	1,055 (1/4)	telephone (rolling)	15.2
Ekos	November 11, 2024		38.6	28.1	16.5	6.5	3.3	5.3	1.8	±2.8 pp	1,241	IVR (rolling)	10.5
Nanos Research	November 8, 2024		40.9	24.8	19.4	8.9	1.3	4.3	—N/a	±3.1 pp	1,023 (1/4)	telephone (rolling)	16.1
Abacus Data	November 5, 2024		41	22	20	8	4	5	1	±2.3 pp	1,915	online	19
Leger	November 3, 2024		42	26	15	9	2	5	1	±2.49 pp	1,549	online	16
Nanos Research	November 1, 2024		40.3	24.2	20.5	7.6	2.1	5.0	—N/a	±3.1 pp	1,039 (1/4)	telephone (rolling)	16.1
Ekos	October 30, 2024		37.2	24.6	18.4	8.9	3.1	5.7	2.1	±2.7 pp	1,340	IVR	12.6
Angus Reid	October 26, 2024		43	21	20	10	1	4	1	±2 pp	1,627	online	22
Nanos Research	October 25, 2024		38.7	25.8	19.8	7.8	2.2	5.4	—N/a	±3.0 pp	1,047 (1/4)	telephone (rolling)	12.9
Abacus Data	October 22, 2024		44	22	18	8	2	5	1	±2.5 pp	1,500	online	22
Nanos Research	October 18, 2024		38.0	24.5	20.4	7.8	2.7	6.1	—N/a	±3.1 pp	1,037 (1/4)	telephone (rolling)	13.5
Nanos Research	October 11, 2024		38.7	23.2	20.6	7.1	2.6	7.3	—N/a	±3.1 pp	1,009 (1/4)	telephone (rolling)	15.5
Campaign Research	October 10, 2024		41	24	18	8	3	5	1	—N/a	5,018	online	17
Abacus Data	October 10, 2024		43	22	19	8	2	4	1	±2.3 pp	1,900	online	21
Pallas Data	October 5, 2024		43.6	22.4	18.7	8.4	1.7	3.7	1.5	±2.7 pp	1,304	IVR	21.2
Nanos Research	October 4, 2024		40.3	21.8	21.3	7.6	2.0	6.5	—N/a	±3.1 pp	1,009 (1/4)	telephone (rolling)	18.5
Mainstreet Research	September 30, 2024		44	19	20	8	3	3	3	±3 pp	1,091	IVR	24
Leger	September 29, 2024		42	25	17	7	3	5	1	±2.43 pp	1,626	online	17
Nanos Research	September 27, 2024		41.6	21.5	21.6	7.1	1.9	5.7	—N/a	±3.0 pp	1,045 (1/4)	telephone (rolling)	20.0
Abacus Data	September 25, 2024		43	21	19	8	3	5	1	±2.4 pp	1,700	online	22
Ekos	September 23, 2024		40.4	24.8	16.9	7.8	3.2	5.1	1.9	±3.2 pp	967	IVR	15.6
Leger	September 22, 2024		44	24	17	7	2	5	1	±2.48 pp	1,556	online	20
Nanos Research	September 20, 2024		41.9	25.3	21.1	5.8	1.7	3.9	—N/a	±3.0 pp	1,059 (1/4)	telephone (rolling)	16.6
Angus Reid	September 18, 2024		43	21	20	10	1	4	1	±2 pp	3,985	online	22
	September 16, 2024	A federal by-election is held in LaSalle—Émard—Verdun. Louis-Philippe Sauvé of the Bloc Québécois flips the seat from the Liberal Party.											
	September 16, 2024	A federal by-election is held in Elmwood—Transcona. Leila Dance holds the seat for the NDP.											
Relay Strategies	September 16, 2024		42.5	22.5	17.8	7.8	3.9	5.5	—N/a	±2 pp	1,774	online	20
Nanos Research	September 13, 2024		41.6	24.5	22.4	6.5	1.5	3.2	—N/a	±3.0 pp	1,059 (1/4)	telephone (rolling)	17.1
Abacus Data	September 12, 2024		43	22	18	8	3	5	0	±1.8 pp	2,964	online	21
Ipsos	September 10, 2024		45	26	16	7	1	4	0	±3.8 pp	1,000	online	19
Leger	September 8, 2024		45	25	15	8	2	4	1	±2.51 pp	1,521	online	20
Nanos Research	September 6, 2024		38.9	26.7	20.7	6.7	1.9	4.2	0.9	±2.9 pp	1,120 (1/4)	telephone (rolling)	12.2
	September 4, 2024	The NDP ends its supply-and-confidence agreement with the Liberal Party.											
Angus Reid	September 3, 2024		43	21	19	10	1	5	1	±2.5 pp	1,420	online	22
Nanos Research	August 30, 2024		38.9	25.8	20.2	6.9	2.4	4.5	1.3	±2.9 pp	1,117 (1/4)	telephone (rolling)	13.1
Leger	August 25, 2024		43	25	15	6	3	7	1	±2.45 pp	1,602	online	18
Nanos Research	August 23, 2024		39.8	24.7	18.9	7.6	2.3	5.1	1.5	±3.0 pp	1,092 (1/4)	telephone (rolling)	15.1
Ekos	August 19, 2024		38.2	23.7	18.2	8.0	3.6	5.7	2.7	±2.3 pp	1,801	IVR	14.5
Abacus Data	August 18, 2024		42	25	18	7	3	4	0	±2.1 pp	2,300	online	17
Nanos Research	August 16, 2024		40.5	26.2	16.3	7.7	3.0	4.8	1.5	±3.0 pp	1,089 (1/4)	telephone (rolling)	14.3
Research Co.	August 14, 2024		40	25	17	9	2	6	1	±3.1 pp	1,002	online	15
Nanos Research	August 9, 2024		40.7	26.7	16.9	7.3	2.7	4.6	1.1	±3.1 pp	1,036 (1/4)	telephone (rolling)	14.0
Abacus Data	August 7, 2024		43	23	18	7	4	4	0	±2.489 pp	1,550	online	20
Nanos Research	August 2, 2024		41.7	25.4	17.4	7.8	2.6	4.4	0.8	±3.1 pp	1,006 (1/4)	telephone (rolling)	16.3
Ekos	July 31, 2024		41.8	23.5	16.1	7.5	3.2	5.0	2.9	±1.52 pp	4,165 (5/7)	IVR (rolling)	18.3
Leger	July 28, 2024		41	23	20	7	2	5	1	±2.45 pp	1,601	online	18
Nanos Research	July 26, 2024		41.2	25.8	17.4	7.5	3.0	4.5	0.8	±3.1 pp	1,032 (1/4)	telephone (rolling)	15.4
Abacus Data	July 22, 2024		42	23	20	8	3	4	0	±2.191 pp	2,000	online	19
Nanos Research	July 19, 2024		40.8	25.6	17.6	7.9	2.7	4.6	0.8	±3.0 pp	1,061 (1/4)	telephone (rolling)	15.2
Nanos Research	July 12, 2024		42.2	24.9	17.1	8.5	2.3	4.4	0.5	±2.9 pp	1,120 (1/4)	telephone (rolling)	17.3
Mainstreet Research	July 9, 2024		45	23	15	8	2	3	2	±2.8 pp	1,184	IVR	22
Abacus Data	July 9, 2024		43	23	18	8	3	5	1	±2.1 pp	1,989	online	20
Nanos Research	July 5, 2024		41.0	25.7	17.3	8.9	2.6	4.2	0.4	±2.9 pp	1,128 (1/4)	telephone (rolling)	15.3
Nanos Research	June 28, 2024		41.4	26.5	16.5	9.5	1.6	4.2	0.3	±2.9 pp	1,117 (1/4)	telephone (rolling)	14.9
Ekos	June 26, 2024		41	25	17	7	4	4	3	±3.4 pp	818	IVR (rolling)	16
Abacus Data	June 25, 2024		42	23	19	8	3	5	—N/a	±2.248 pp	1,900	online	19
	June 24, 2024	A federal by-election is held in Toronto—St. Paul's. Conservative Don Stewart flips the seat from the Liberal Party.											
Leger	June 23, 2024		41	27	17	7	3	4	1	±2.45 pp	1,607	online	14
Spark Advocacy	June 21, 2024		42	23	17	7	3	4	4	—N/a	2,688	online	19
Nanos Research	June 21, 2024		41.3	26.8	16.8	8.4	2.3	4.2	0.3	±2.9 pp	1,142 (1/4)	telephone (rolling)	14.5
Angus Reid	June 17, 2024		42	21	20	10	2	4	1	±2 pp	3,080	online	21
Ipsos	June 14, 2024		42	24	18	8	4	3	1	±3.8 pp	1,001	online	18
Nanos Research	June 14, 2024		41.3	27.1	17.5	7.8	2.2	4.0	0.1	±3.0 pp	1,103 (1/4)	telephone (rolling)	14.2
Abacus Data	June 13, 2024		42	22	19	8	3	5	1	±2.53 pp	1,550	online	20
Ekos	June 11, 2024		45	21	16	7	3	5	3	±1.8 pp	3,006	IVR	24
Nanos Research	June 7, 2024		40.8	28.5	17.9	6.9	1.9	3.9	0.2	±3.0 pp	1,100 (1/4)	telephone (rolling)	12.3
Nanos Research	May 31, 2024		41.5	26.2	18.2	7.6	2.3	4.0	0.2	±2.9 pp	1,154 (1/4)	online	15.3
Leger	May 26, 2024		42	23	18	6	3	5	1	±2.44 pp	1,620	online	19
Nanos Research	May 24, 2024		41.7	26.3	18.6	7.9	1.3	4.1	0.2	±3.0 pp	1,105 (1/4)	telephone (rolling)	15.4
Abacus Data	May 21, 2024		41	25	18	8	3	4	1	±2.0 pp	2,415	online	16
Nanos Research	May 17, 2024		42.8	25.0	17.1	7.7	2.5	4.5	0.5	±2.9 pp	1,152 (1/4)	telephone (rolling)	17.8
Abacus Data	May 15, 2024		43	24	17	7	3	4	1	±2.0 pp	2,000	online	19
Ipsos	May 13, 2024		44	25	16	8	3	2	1	±3.8 pp	1,000	online	19
Nanos Research	May 10, 2024		43.2	22.8	15.9	10.3	2.5	4.3	1.0	±2.9 pp	1,135 (1/4)	telephone (rolling)	20.4
Relay Strategies	May 9, 2024		45	23	16	7	3	4	2	±3 pp	1,555	online	22
Nanos Research	May 3, 2024		42.4	24.4	16.1	7.4	3.1	5.2	—N/a	±3 pp	1,082 (1/4)	telephone (rolling)	18.0
Mainstreet Research	April 30, 2024		43.2	25.4	15.0	7.0	2.6	3.8	2.9	±2.6 pp	1,392	IVR	17.8
Abacus Data	April 29, 2024		44	23	17	7	4	4	1	±2.6 pp	1,500	online	21
Leger	April 28, 2024		44	23	17	8	2	5	1	±2.44 pp	1,610	online	21
Nanos Research	April 26, 2024		43.6	23.7	16.3	8.3	3.0	4.0	1.1	±3 pp	1,105 (1/4)	telephone (rolling)	19.9
Angus Reid	April 23, 2024		43	23	19	8	1	4	2	±2 pp	3,015	online	20
Ekos	April 22, 2024		36.9	25.9	22.8	6.4	3.1	4.2	0.8	±3.1 pp	1,033	telephone/online	11.0
Innovative Research	April 21, 2024		41	26	17	8	—N/a	5	3	—N/a	1,408	online	15
Nanos Research	April 19, 2024		41.8	23.3	19.1	9.3	3.0	2.7	0.8	±3.1 pp	1,037 (1/4)	telephone (rolling)	18.5
Ipsos	April 18, 2024		43	24	19	8	4	2	1	±3.8 pp	1,000	online	19
Abacus Data	April 16, 2024		43	23	18	7	3	5	1	±2 pp	2,300	online	20
Nanos Research	April 12, 2024		40.0	23.7	20.6	9.1	2.2	3.6	0.8	±3 pp	1,053 (1/4)	telephone (rolling)	16.3
Research Co.	April 10, 2024		38	26	20	10	1	3	1	±3.1 pp	1,001	online	12
Abacus Data	April 9, 2024		44	24	17	6	3	5	1	±2.1 pp	2,000	online	20
Pallas Data	April 8, 2024		41.3	26.4	17.5	7	2.6	4.1	1.0	±2 pp	2,375	IVR	14.9
Nanos Research	April 5, 2024		38.4	25.9	18.9	9.7	1.7	3.8	1.6	±3 pp	1,089 (1/4)	telephone (rolling)	12.5
Nanos Research	March 29, 2024		37.5	25.7	18.7	9.9	2.1	4.7	1.3	±3 pp	1,075 (1/4)	telephone (rolling)	11.8
Leger	March 25, 2024		42	26	17	7	2	4	1	±2.45 pp	1,605	online	16
Nanos Research	March 22, 2024		39.3	24.1	19.8	9.2	1.5	5.0	1.0	±3 pp	1,092 (1/4)	telephone (rolling)	15.2
Abacus Data	March 21, 2024		41	23	19	7	4	4	0	±1.7 pp	3,550	online	18
Ipsos	March 18, 2024		41	23	20	7	3	4	1	±3.8 pp	1,000	online	18
Nanos Research	March 15, 2024		39.2	24.7	20.3	8.2	1.5	5.0	1.1	±3 pp	1,092 (1/4)	telephone (rolling)	14.5
Mainstreet Research	March 9, 2024		45.6	24.9	15.4	6.1	2.1	3.6	2.4	±2.7 pp	1,274	IVR	20.7
Nanos Research	March 8, 2024		40.6	23.3	21.2	7.2	1.7	4.9	1.0	±3.1 pp	1,000 (1/4)	telephone (rolling)	17.3
Abacus Data	March 6, 2024		42	24	18	7	3	4	1	±2.5 pp	1,500	online	18
Angus Reid	March 4, 2024		40	23	21	9	2	4	1	±2 pp	3,908	online	17
	March 4, 2024	A federal by-election is held in Durham. Jamil Jivani holds the seat for the Conservative Party.											
Nanos Research	March 1, 2024		42.8	23.3	21.4	6.2	1.3	4.2	0.7	±3.1 pp	1,000 (1/4)	telephone (rolling)	19.5
Leger	February 25, 2024		41	25	18	7	3	5	1	±2.49 pp	1,590	online	16
Nanos Research	February 23, 2024		40.8	23.4	22.1	6.6	1.4	4.7	1.0	±3.1 pp	1,000 (1/4)	telephone (rolling)	17.4
Abacus Data	February 21, 2024		41	24	19	8	3	5	1	±2.1 pp	2,125	online	17
Nanos Research	February 16, 2024		40.6	23.8	21.9	6.2	1.5	5.1	0.9	±3.1 pp	1,000 (1/4)	telephone (rolling)	16.8
Nanos Research	February 9, 2024		40.2	24.0	20.9	6.9	1.4	5.7	0.9	±3.1 pp	1,000 (1/4)	telephone (rolling)	16.2
Abacus Data	February 7, 2024		43	24	18	8	3	4	0	±2.0 pp	2,398	online	19
Nanos Research	February 2, 2024		40.0	24.7	20.6	7.4	1.3	5.1	—N/a	±3.1 pp	1,000 (1/4)	telephone (rolling)	15.3
Leger	January 28, 2024		40	25	20	8	2	5	1	±2.47 pp	1,579	online	15
Mainstreet Research	January 26, 2024		43	26	16	6	3	4	2	±3.2 pp	947	IVR	17
Nanos Research	January 26, 2024		39.0	27.1	20.4	6.8	1.4	4.7	—N/a	±3.1 pp	1,000 (1/4)	telephone (rolling)	11.9
Abacus Data	January 23, 2024		40	25	20	8	3	5	0	±2.1 pp	2,199	online	15
Ipsos	January 22, 2024		36	27	20	8	3	3	2	±3.8 pp	1,001	online	9
Nanos Research	January 19, 2024		38.7	26.2	21.1	7.6	2.2	3.5	—N/a	±3.1 pp	1,000 (1/4)	telephone (rolling)	12.5
Angus Reid	January 17, 2024		41	24	20	9	1	4	2	±2 pp	1,620	online	17
Nanos Research	January 12, 2024		39.4	27.6	19.6	7.4	2.0	3.3	—N/a	±3.1 pp	1,000 (1/4)	telephone (rolling)	11.8
Abacus Data	January 9, 2024		41	24	18	7	5	4	0	±2.6 pp	1,500	online	17
Nanos Research	January 5, 2024		38.3	26.4	20.5	7.4	2.1	4.2	—N/a	±3.1 pp	1,000 (1/4)	telephone (rolling)	11.9
Nanos Research	December 29, 2023		40.3	26.6	18.1	7.3	1.9	4.8	—N/a	±3.1 pp	1,000 (1/4)	telephone (rolling)	13.7
Spark Advocacy	December 27, 2023		40	26	19	8	5	3	—N/a	±2.0 pp	2,175	online	14
Nanos Research	December 22, 2023		40.6	27.0	18.2	6.9	1.4	5.1	—N/a	±3.1 pp	1,000 (1/4)	telephone (rolling)	13.6
Leger	December 17, 2023		38	28	18	7	2	5	2	±2.43 pp	1,622	online	10
Pallas Data	December 15, 2023		40.5	27.2	16.6	7.1	3.4	4.7	0.4	±2.9 pp	1,177	online	13.3
Nanos Research	December 15, 2023		40.8	24.9	20.4	5.7	1.6	5.6	—N/a	±3.1 pp	1,000 (1/4)	telephone (rolling)	15.9
Abacus Data	December 12, 2023		37	27	19	7	4	5	1	±2.3 pp	1,919	online	10
Mainstreet Research	December 9, 2023		42	24	17	7	3	5	2	±3.3 pp	879	IVR	18
Nanos Research	December 8, 2023		39.8	26.1	20.2	5.6	1.8	5.5	—N/a	±3.1 pp	1,000 (1/4)	telephone (rolling)	13.7
Innovative Research	December 5, 2023		40	24	19	7	4	5	—N/a	—N/a	5,534	online	16
Angus Reid	December 1, 2023		41	24	20	9	1	4	2	±1.5 pp	3,755	online	17
Nanos Research	December 1, 2023		40.4	23.4	21.2	6.3	1.9	5.2	—N/a	±3.1 pp	1,000 (1/4)	telephone (rolling)	17.0
Abacus Data	November 28, 2023		42	23	19	7	3	4	1	±2.0 pp	2,417	online	19
Research Co.	November 27, 2023		38	24	21	9	2	4	1	±3.1 pp	1,000	online	14
Pluriel Research	November 26, 2023		39	25	19	7	—N/a	6	4	±2.6 pp	1,374	online	14
Leger	November 26, 2023		40	26	20	7	2	3	1	±2.51 pp	1,529	online	14
Nanos Research	November 24, 2023		41.0	22.0	22.0	6.1	2.0	5.5	—N/a	±3.1 pp	1,000 (1/4)	telephone (rolling)	19.0
Abacus Data	November 22, 2023		39	24	20	8	4	5	1	±1.7 pp	3,450	online	15
Ipsos	November 17, 2023		40	24	21	8	2	4	1	±3.8 pp	1,000	online	16
Nanos Research	November 17, 2023		39	24	22	6	3	6	—N/a	±3.1 pp	1,000 (1/4)	telephone (rolling)	15
Angus Reid	November 14, 2023		41	27	20	7	1	4	1	±1.5 pp	2,512	online	14
Abacus Data	November 12, 2023		41	25	19	6	4	3	—N/a	±2.3 pp	2,000	online	16
Nanos Research	November 10, 2023		40.3	22.4	20.3	6.7	2.1	7.2	—N/a	±3.1 pp	1,000 (1/4)	telephone (rolling)	17.9
Mainstreet Research	November 6, 2023		41.0	25.8	18.2	6.2	2.9	4.1	1.8	±2.3 pp	1,892	IVR	15.2
Nanos Research	November 3, 2023		40	25	20	6	2	6	—N/a	±3.1 pp	1,000 (1/4)	telephone (rolling)	15
Abacus Data	November 1, 2023		39	26	18	7	4	5	1	±2.1 pp	2,200	online	13
Innovative Research	October 31, 2023		38	24	20	7	4	5	—N/a	—N/a	5,974	online	14
Leger	October 29, 2023		40	26	17	7	3	6	1	±2.4 pp	1,632	online	14
Nanos Research	October 27, 2023		37.7	25.4	19.9	5.5	3.4	7.9	—N/a	±3.1 pp	1,000 (1/4)	telephone (rolling)	12.3
Pallas Data	October 22, 2023		42.5	26.5	16.1	6.8	3.4	3.2	1.6	±2.5 pp	1,484	IVR	16.0
Nanos Research	October 20, 2023		39.5	23.6	19.3	5.0	4.5	7.5	—N/a	±3.1 pp	1,000 (1/4)	telephone (rolling)	15.9
Angus Reid	October 13, 2023		39	28	21	7	1	3	1	±2 pp	1,878	online	11
Nanos Research	October 13, 2023		40	25	19	5	3	7	—N/a	±3.1 pp	1,000 (1/4)	telephone (rolling)	15
Mainstreet Research	October 12, 2023		41	27	17	6	3	3	2	±2.8 pp	1,223	IVR	14
Abacus Data	October 10, 2023		40	26	19	7	—N/a	5	—N/a	±2.2 pp	1,915	online	14
Nanos Research	October 6, 2023		38	26	20	6	3	7	—N/a	±3.1 pp	1,000 (1/4)	telephone (rolling)	12
Abacus Data	October 5, 2023		39	26	18	7	5	4	—N/a	±2.2 pp	1,985	online	13
Nanos Research	September 29, 2023		37.9	26.5	21.2	6.2	2.0	5.7	—N/a	±3.1 pp	1,000 (1/4)	telephone (rolling)	11.4
Leger	September 24, 2023		39	27	18	7	2	4	2	±2.4 pp	1,652	online	12
Ekos	September 24, 2023		42.1	22.9	17.9	6.4	2.9	6.9	0.9	±3.1 pp	1,025	IVR	19.2
Nanos Research	September 22, 2023		35.6	28.6	21.4	7.3	1.7	5.1	—N/a	±3.1 pp	1,000 (1/4)	telephone (rolling)	7.0
Ipsos	September 18, 2023		39	30	17	8	2	3	2	±2.9 pp	1,500	online	9
Nanos Research	September 15, 2023		34.9	28.9	22.2	7.1	1.8	4.7	—N/a	±3.1 pp	1,000 (1/4)	telephone (rolling)	6.0
Abacus Data	September 13, 2023		41	26	18	8	3	3	1	±2.1 pp	2,125	online	15
Pluriel Research	September 8, 2023		37.9	29.1	19.6	6.4	—N/a	4.0	3.0	±3 pp	1,001	online	8.8
Nanos Research	September 8, 2023		34.0	29.0	21.8	7.1	2.6	5.2	—N/a	±3.1 pp	1,000 (1/4)	telephone (rolling)	5.0
Angus Reid	September 6, 2023		39	27	19	8	2	4	0	±1.5 pp	3,400	online	12
Research Co.	September 4, 2023		37	31	17	8	1	3	1	±3.1 pp	1,000	online	6
Abacus Data	September 4, 2023		40	26	19	6	3	4	1	±1.7 pp	3,595	online	14
Nanos Research	September 1, 2023		32	32	21	7	3	6	—N/a	±3.1 pp	1,000 (1/4)	telephone (rolling)	0
Leger	August 27, 2023		38	29	18	8	2	4	1	±2.5 pp	1,597	online	9
Nanos Research	August 25, 2023		33	30	22	7	2	6	—N/a	±3.1 pp	1,000 (1/4)	telephone (rolling)	3
Mainstreet Research	August 23, 2023		41	28	15	7	3	4	3	±2.7 pp	1,280	IVR	13
Abacus Data	August 23, 2023		38	26	19	7	4	4	—N/a	±2.0 pp	2,189	online	12
Nanos Research	August 18, 2023		34.1	29.5	19.8	7.2	2.4	6.8	—N/a	±3.1 pp	1,000 (1/4)	telephone (rolling)	4.6
Pallas Data	August 17, 2023		39.1	29.6	16.6	6.7	2.0	4.7	1.2	±3.1 pp	1,021	IVR	9.5
Angus Reid	August 11, 2023		38	31	18	7	1	5	0	±2 pp	1,606	online	7
Nanos Research	August 11, 2023		35	29	19	7	2	7	—N/a	±3.1 pp	1,000 (1/4)	telephone (rolling)	6
Abacus Data	August 7, 2023		37	28	19	8	3	4	1	±2.0 pp	1,650	online	9
Nanos Research	August 4, 2023		37	27	20	7	3	6	—N/a	±3.1 pp	1,000 (1/4)	telephone (rolling)	10
Nanos Research	July 28, 2023		36	29	17	7	3	5	—N/a	±3.1 pp	1,000 (1/4)	telephone (rolling)	7
Abacus Data	July 25, 2023		38	28	18	7	4	5	1	±2.0 pp	2,486	online	10
	July 24, 2023	A federal by-election is held in Calgary Heritage. Shuvaloy Majumdar holds the seat for the Conservative Party.											
Nanos Research	July 21, 2023		35.4	28.6	19.6	7.1	2.3	5.9	—N/a	±3.1 pp	1,000 (1/4)	telephone (rolling)	6.8
Nanos Research	July 14, 2023		35	29	19	7	2	7	—N/a	±3.1 pp	1,000 (1/4)	telephone (rolling)	6
Leger	July 10, 2023		37	28	17	7	3	5	2	±2.5 pp	1,512	online	9
Mainstreet Research	July 8, 2023		37	30	17	6	3	5	2	±2.8 pp	1,200	IVR	7
Nanos Research	July 7, 2023		37	30	19	7	2	6	—N/a	±3.1 pp	1,000 (1/4)	telephone (rolling)	7
Nanos Research	June 30, 2023		35.8	29.6	18.9	6.4	2.4	6.1	—N/a	±3.1 pp	1,000 (1/4)	telephone (rolling)	6.2
Abacus Data	June 27, 2023		34	29	20	7	5	5	1	±2.0 pp	1,500	online	5
Pollara	June 23, 2023		32	30	21	8	3	5	1	±1.2 pp	7,001	online	2
Nanos Research	June 23, 2023		35	29	20	7	3	6	—N/a	±3.1 pp	1,000 (1/4)	telephone (rolling)	6
Ipsos	June 20, 2023		37	32	16	8	2	3	1	±3.5 pp	1,000	online	5
	June 19, 2023	A federal by-election is held in Notre-Dame-de-Grâce—Westmount. Anna Gainey holds the seat for the Liberal Party.											
	June 19, 2023	A federal by-election is held in Oxford. Arpan Khanna holds the seat for the Conservative Party.											
	June 19, 2023	A federal by-election is held in Portage—Lisgar. Branden Leslie holds the seat for the Conservative Party.											
	June 19, 2023	A federal by-election is held in Winnipeg South Centre. Ben Carr holds the seat for the Liberal Party.											
Nanos Research	June 16, 2023		35	30	21	7	3	5	—N/a	±3.1 pp	1,000 (1/4)	telephone (rolling)	5
Abacus Data	June 11, 2023		35	28	21	7	4	4	1	±2.0 pp	2,000	online	7
Nanos Research	June 9, 2023		32	30	23	6	3	5	—N/a	±3.1 pp	1,000 (1/4)	telephone (rolling)	2
Mainstreet Research	June 8, 2023		35	29	21	5	2	5	3	±3 pp	1,045	IVR	6
Angus Reid	June 3, 2023		37	29	20	8	2	4	0	±1 pp	3,885	online	8
Nanos Research	June 2, 2023		32.4	29.3	23.8	6.8	2.7	3.8	—N/a	±3.1 pp	1,000 (1/4)	telephone (rolling)	3.1
Leger	May 29, 2023		31	33	19	8	2	6	1	±2.51 pp	1,531	online	2
Nanos Research	May 26, 2023		33	28	24	7	3	4	—N/a	±3.1 pp	1,000 (1/4)	telephone (rolling)	5
Nanos Research	May 19, 2023		34	27	24	7	3	5	—N/a	±3.1 pp	1,000 (1/4)	telephone (rolling)	7
Abacus Data	May 12, 2023		33	30	18	7	5	5	1	±2.0 pp	2,500	online	3
Nanos Research	May 12, 2023		36	27	22	7	4	4	—N/a	±3.1 pp	1,000 (1/4)	telephone (rolling)	9
Leger	May 8, 2023		33	32	20	7	2	5	2	±2.51 pp	1,523	online	1
Mainstreet Research	May 6, 2023		36	30	17	6	3	4	2	±2.7 pp	1,272	IVR	6
Nanos Research	May 5, 2023		35.2	27.7	21.7	7.1	3.4	4.3	—N/a	±3.1 pp	1,000 (1/4)	telephone (rolling)	7.5
Abacus Data	May 3, 2023		33	31	19	7	5	4	1	±2.4 pp	1,750	online	2
Nanos Research	April 28, 2023		35	30	20	6	3	5	—N/a	±3.1 pp	1,000 (1/4)	telephone (rolling)	5
Leger	April 23, 2023		36	30	19	7	2	4	1	—N/a	1,515	online	6
Nanos Research	April 21, 2023		34	31	21	6	3	4	—N/a	±3.1 pp	1,000 (1/4)	telephone (rolling)	3
Nanos Research	April 14, 2023		34	31	21	6	3	5	—N/a	±3.1 pp	1,000 (1/4)	telephone (rolling)	3
Leger	April 10, 2023		34	30	21	8	3	3	1	±2.52 pp	1,517	online	4
Nanos Research	April 7, 2023		35.8	30.6	18.1	5.5	3.4	5.3	—N/a	±3.1 pp	1,000 (1/4)	telephone (rolling)	5.2
Nanos Research	March 31, 2023		36	28	20	6	4	5	—N/a	±3.1 pp	1,000 (1/4)	telephone (rolling)	8
Mainstreet Research	March 30, 2023		35.9	28.9	18.1	6.5	1.8	6.8	2.1	±2.8 pp	1,267	IVR	7.0
Nanos Research	March 24, 2023		34.8	28.9	19.0	6.3	4.4	5.3	—N/a	±3.1 pp	1,000 (1/4)	telephone (rolling)	5.9
Abacus Data	March 21, 2023		33	31	18	8	5	4	1	±2.3 pp	1,963	online	2
Nanos Research	March 17, 2023		34	27	20	9	5	5	—N/a	±3.1 pp	1,000 (1/4)	telephone (rolling)	7
Angus Reid	March 13, 2023		35	29	20	8	2	4	1	±1 pp	4,899	online	6
Ekos	March 13, 2023		31.4	28.2	25.0	6.0	3.6	4.8	1.1	±1.6 pp	3,115	telephone/online	3.2
Leger	March 12, 2023		32	33	19	9	2	4	1	±2.49 pp	1,544	online	1
Mainstreet Research	March 10, 2023		36.9	30.8	15.2	6.2	3.3	4.8	2.7	±2.8 pp	1,255	IVR	6.1
Abacus Data	March 10, 2023		34	29	19	7	6	3	1	±2.6 pp	1,500	online	5
Nanos Research	March 10, 2023		32.8	28.4	20.6	8.9	3.5	5.0	—N/a	±3.1 pp	1,000 (1/4)	telephone (rolling)	4.4
Abacus Data	March 4, 2023		36	29	18	8	4	3	2	±2.0 pp	2,600	online	7
Nanos Research	March 3, 2023		34	30	20	9	3	5	—N/a	±3.1 pp	1,000 (3/4)	telephone (rolling)	4
Research Co.	February 27, 2023		33	34	18	8	1	3	1	±3.1 pp	1,000	online	1
Abacus Data	February 18, 2023		37	29	18	7	4	4	1	±1.6 pp	4,000	online	8
Ipsos	February 17, 2023		33	33	18	7	3	4	1	±3.1 pp	1,350	online	0
Leger	February 12, 2023		35	32	18	7	2	4	1	±2.50 pp	1,539	online	3
Nanos Research	February 10, 2023		32.9	33.1	20.5	6.4	2.8	4.1	—N/a	±3.1 pp	1,000 (1/2)	telephone (rolling)	0.2
Pollara	February 6, 2023		32	32	20	8	3	4	1	±1.8 pp	3,850	online	0
Abacus Data	January 30, 2023		37	29	18	7	4	4	1	±2.6 pp	1,500	online	8
Mainstreet Research	January 27, 2023		36.9	33.1	13.6	6.4	2.4	4.8	2.8	±2.8 pp	1,261	IVR	3.8
Nanos Research	January 27, 2023		34	31	19	8	2	5	—N/a	±3.1 pp	1,000 (1/4)	telephone (rolling)	3
Leger	January 22, 2023		34	34	19	7	1	3	1	±2.49 pp	1,554	online	0
Nanos Research	January 20, 2023		35	30	18	9	2	6	—N/a	±3.1 pp	1,000 (1/4)	telephone (rolling)	5
Abacus Data	January 16, 2023		35	31	18	7	5	4	1	±2.2 pp	2,099	online	4
Nanos Research	January 13, 2023		35.6	28.3	20.7	7.4	2.1	5.8	—N/a	±3.1 pp	1,000 (1/4)	telephone (rolling)	7.3
Pollara	January 12, 2023		32	33	21	8	2	4	—N/a	—N/a	3,020	online	1
Nanos Research	January 6, 2023		34	29	22	6	3	6	—N/a	±3.1 pp	1,000 (1/4)	telephone (rolling)	5
Nanos Research	December 30, 2022		34	29	22	6	3	6	—N/a	±3.1 pp	1,000 (1/4)	telephone (rolling)	5
Nanos Research	December 23, 2022		35	29	23	6	2	5	—N/a	±3.1 pp	1,000 (1/4)	telephone (rolling)	6
Pollara	December 20, 2022		33	30	21	8	3	5	—N/a	—N/a	4,020	online	3
Nanos Research	December 16, 2022		35	29	21	6	3	5	—N/a	±3.0 pp	1,000 (1/4)	telephone (rolling)	6
Mainstreet Research	December 15, 2022		36.0	31.3	18.6	5.8	2.9	3.9	1.5	±2.6 pp	1,416	IVR	4.7
	December 12, 2022	A federal by-election is held in Mississauga—Lakeshore. Charles Sousa holds the seat for the Liberal Party.											
Leger	December 11, 2022		33	30	21	7	4	4	2	±2.50 pp	1,526	online	3
Abacus Data	December 10, 2022		36	30	19	6	4	4	1	—N/a	2,500	online	6
Nanos Research	December 9, 2022		33.6	30.3	20.9	5.5	2.6	5.0	—N/a	±3.1 pp	1,000 (1/4)	telephone (rolling)	3.3
Mainstreet Research	December 8, 2022		37.9	33.6	16.4	5.1	2.4	3.6	1.0	±2.8 pp	1,267	IVR	4.3
Nanos Research	December 2, 2022		33	31	22	6	3	5	—N/a	±3.1 pp	1,000 (1/4)	telephone (rolling)	2
Nanos Research	November 25, 2022		30.3	31.0	22.5	7.1	3.4	4.8	—N/a	±3.1 pp	1,000 (1/2)	telephone (rolling)	0.7
Ekos	November 23, 2022		33.6	31.3	18.1	5.1	3.4	6.6	1.9	±3.1 pp	1,034	IVR	2.3
	November 19, 2022	Elizabeth May is elected leader of the Green Party.											
Innovative Research	November 14, 2022		33	32	18	7	2	6	1	—N/a	2,236	online	1
Leger	November 13, 2022		34	32	19	7	2	4	2	±2.50 pp	1,537	online	2
Nanos Research	November 11, 2022		31.3	32.9	20.0	8.1	1.7	5.1	—N/a	±3.1 pp	1,000 (1/2)	telephone (rolling)	1.6
Mainstreet Research	November 7, 2022		37.6	30.3	19.3	3.8	4.1	3.5	1.4	±2.7 pp	1,276	IVR	7.3
Pollara	November 3, 2022		33	31	20	9	3	3	—N/a	—N/a	3,418	online	2
Nanos Research	October 28, 2022		34.4	32.1	16.9	7.9	3.2	4.3	—N/a	±3.1 pp	1,000 (1/4)	telephone (rolling)	2.3
Research Co.	October 26, 2022		35	31	19	8	2	4	1	±3.1 pp	1,000	online	4
Abacus Data	October 26, 2022		34	31	18	6	4	5	1	±2.1 pp	1,500	online	3
Nanos Research	October 21, 2022		36	30	17	8	4	4	—N/a	±3.1 pp	1,000 (1/4)	telephone (rolling)	6
Nanos Research	October 14, 2022		35	34	18	6	3	5	—N/a	±3.1 pp	1,000 (1/4)	telephone (rolling)	1
Leger	October 10, 2022		33	31	21	8	2	3	1	±2.50 pp	1,534	online	2
Nanos Research	October 7, 2022		33	32	21	6	2	5	—N/a	±3.1 pp	1,000 (1/4)	telephone (rolling)	1
Nanos Research	September 30, 2022		33	29	23	6	2	5	—N/a	±3.1 pp	1,000 (1/2)	telephone (rolling)	4
Mainstreet Research	September 22, 2022		40.8	32.7	12.4	5.2	3.4	2.6	2.7	±3.0 pp	1,088	IVR	8.1
Angus Reid	September 22, 2022		37	30	20	7	1	3	1	±2 pp	5,014	online	7
Ipsos	September 21, 2022		35	30	20	7	3	3	2	±3.5 pp	1,000	online	5
Leger	September 18, 2022		34	28	23	8	3	3	1	±2.51 pp	1,522	online	6
Ekos	September 16, 2022		33.7	31.7	20.1	5.9	3.1	5.0	0.5	±3.1 pp	1,005	IVR	2.0
Nanos Research	September 16, 2022		30.7	28.4	26.0	6.0	3.4	4.8	—N/a	±3.00 pp	1,000	telephone (rolling)	2.3
Abacus Data	September 14, 2022		35	30	17	9	4	4	1	±2.2 pp	1,990	online	5
	September 10, 2022	Pierre Poilievre is elected leader of the Conservative Party.											
Abacus Data	August 30, 2022		33	32	19	7	5	3	1	±2.6 pp	1,500	online	1
Nanos Research	August 19, 2022		32.5	33.3	20.1	5.5	2.1	5.6	—N/a	±3.00 pp	1,000 (1/2)	telephone (rolling)	0.8
Leger	August 7, 2022		28	33	21	8	5	4	2	±2.52 pp	1,509	online	5
Nanos Research	August 5, 2022		32.6	29.0	22.7	6.3	1.7	6.8	—N/a	±3.0 pp	1,000	telephone (rolling)	3.6
Abacus Data	July 27, 2022		35	30	19	7	4	4	1	±2.0 pp	2,400	online	5
Mainstreet Research	July 18, 2022		38.3	27.6	18.1	5.9	5.2	2.6	2.3	±2.3 pp	1,749	online	10.7
Abacus Data	July 17, 2022		33	31	19	8	4	4	1	±2.6 pp	1,500	online	2
Leger	July 10, 2022		28	32	21	7	5	4	3	±2.49 pp	1,538	online	4
Nanos Research	July 8, 2022		34.1	30.6	20.8	5.6	2.8	5.4	—N/a	±3.0 pp	1,000 (3/4)	telephone (rolling)	3.5
Abacus Data	June 23, 2022		34	30	18	8	5	4	1	±1.8 pp	3,026	online	4
Ipsos	June 20, 2022		33	32	21	8	2	2	1	±2.5 pp	2,002	online	1
Nanos Research	June 17, 2022		35.5	30.5	19.2	6.1	2.9	5.1	—N/a	±2.9 pp	1,000	telephone (rolling)	5.0
Mainstreet Research	June 16, 2022		25.8	34.0	22.8	7.8	3.1	4.5	2.0	±2.8 pp	1,200	online	8.2
Leger	June 12, 2022		32	30	21	6	4	4	2	±2.5 pp	1,528	online	2
Abacus Data	May 24, 2022		31	31	19	8	5	5	1	±2.6 pp	1,500	online	0
Nanos Research	May 20, 2022		32.5	34.4	19.6	6.1	3.3	4.1	—N/a	±2.9 pp	1,000	telephone (rolling)	1.9
Ekos	May 17, 2022		35.4	29.2	19.9	4.3	4.2	4.5	3	±2.8 pp	1,244	IVR	6.2
Ekos	May 9, 2022		31.4	31.8	20.3	4.8	4.8	5.2	2	±2.1 pp	2,140	IVR	0.4
Abacus Data	May 6, 2022		33	31	19	8	5	3	1	±2.6 pp	1,500	online	2
Mainstreet Research	April 29, 2022		38.4	32.2	16.9	6.7	—N/a	2.8	3.1	±2.7 pp	1,327	IVR	6.2
Nanos Research	April 22, 2022		35.6	30.0	19.6	5.4	3.4	5.5	—N/a	±2.9 pp	1,000 (1/2)	telephone (rolling)	5.6
Leger	April 10, 2022		29	31	21	7	6	4	2	±2.5 pp	1,538	online	2
Abacus Data	April 9, 2022		31	33	18	8	5	4	1	±2.1 pp	2,000	online	2
Nanos Research	April 8, 2022		33	33	18	—N/a	—N/a	—N/a	—N/a	±3.0 pp	1,000 (1/4)	telephone (rolling)	0
Nanos Research	April 1, 2022		31	33	21	—N/a	—N/a	—N/a	—N/a	±3.0 pp	1,000 (1/4)	telephone (rolling)	2
Abacus Data	March 25, 2022		33	31	17	7	6	4	1	±2.6 pp	1,500	online	2
Nanos Research	March 25, 2022		31.3	32.2	21.6	5.9	3.6	4.8	—N/a	±2.9 pp	1,000 (1/2)	telephone (rolling)	0.9
	March 22, 2022	The Liberals and NDP enter into a confidence-and-supply agreement.											
Nanos Research	March 11, 2022		29.3	32.1	22.2	6.4	5.0	4.9	—N/a	±3.0 pp	1,000 (1/2)	telephone (rolling)	2.8
Leger	March 6, 2022		28	33	22	8	5	3	1	±2.5 pp	1,591	online	5
Nanos Research	February 25, 2022		32.2	30.3	17.7	—N/a	5.4	6.8	—N/a	±3.1 pp	1,000 (1/2)	telephone (rolling)	1.9
Abacus Data	February 22, 2022		31	31	20	8	6	3	1	±1.4 pp	5,200	online	0
Ipsos	February 21, 2022		32	32	23	6	4	3	1	±3.5 pp	1,001	online	0
Mainstreet Research	February 17, 2022		38.7	30.6	14.6	6.3	6.2	1.9	1.7	±2.7 pp	1,323	IVR	8.1
Nanos Research	February 11, 2022		31.1	30.6	16.9	7.1	7.1	6.4	—N/a	±3.0 pp	1,000 (1/2)	telephone (rolling)	0.5
Abacus Data	February 8, 2022		30	33	19	8	6	3	1	±2.6 pp	1,500	online	3
Leger	February 6, 2022		29	33	21	8	4	4	0	±2.49 pp	1,546	online	4
	February 2, 2022	Erin O'Toole is removed as leader of the Conservative Party. Candice Bergen is named interim leader.											
Nanos Research	January 28, 2022		30.4	29.9	20.7	—N/a	6.7	5.8	—N/a	±3.1 pp	1,000 (1/4)	telephone (rolling)	0.5
Mainstreet Research	January 23, 2022		29.3	29.4	16.7	5.8	12.7	3.2	2.8	±2.3 pp	1,813	IVR	0.1
Leger	January 23, 2022		31	34	18	7	6	3	2	±2.51 pp	1,525	online	3
Nanos Research	January 21, 2022		29.4	28.4	22.3	5.6	—N/a	7.0	—N/a	±3.1 pp	1,000 (1/4)	telephone (rolling)	1.0
Ekos	January 17, 2022		29.7	30.3	19.5	5.9	9.1	4.5	1	±1.9 pp	2,612	IVR	0.6
Nanos Research	January 14, 2022		28.5	28.2	24.3	6.1	5.3	6.3	—N/a	±3.0 pp	1,000 (1/4)	telephone (rolling)	0.3
Angus Reid	January 12, 2022		29	34	20	5	6	3	2	±2.0 pp	5,002	online	5
Abacus Data	January 12, 2022		30	32	19	8	7	3	1	±2.089 pp	2,200	online	2
Nanos Research	January 7, 2022		29.0	30.6	21.4	6.2	5.7	6.1	—N/a	±3.0 pp	1,000	telephone (rolling)	1.6
Discover by Navigator	January 5, 2022		29	32	22	6	7	4	—N/a	—N/a	2,513	online	3
Ekos	December 21, 2021		25	32	23	4	10	4	2	±3.1 pp	1,015	–	7
Nanos Research	December 10, 2021		30.4	33.3	19.8	6.2	6.7	7.0	—N/a	±3.0 pp	1,000	telephone (rolling)	2.9
Leger	December 5, 2021		29	36	19	7	5	3	1	±2.49 pp	1,547	online	7
Mainstreet Research	November 30, 2021		30.3	33.5	15.7	5.5	10.0	3.2	1.9	±2.36 pp	1,719	IVR	3.2
Abacus Data	November 30, 2021		30	32	20	8	6	3	1	±2.2 pp	2,025	online	2
Angus Reid	November 29, 2021		29	35	20	7	5	2	1	±2 pp	2,005	online	6
	November 27, 2021	Amita Kuttner is named interim leader of the Green Party.											
Ekos	November 21, 2021		26.6	30.4	19.1	5.9	11.4	5.2	1	±3.1 pp	1,006	IVR	3.8
Leger	November 7, 2021		26	35	22	8	5	3	2	±2.48 pp	1,565	online	9
Nanos Research	October 29, 2021		30.1	30.8	21.6	7.4	5.8	3.1	—N/a	±3.1 pp	1,000 (1/4)	telephone (rolling)	0.7
Mainstreet Research	October 24, 2021		33.3	33.8	15.4	5.5	—N/a	3.0	8.9	±2.4 pp	1,711	IVR	0.5
Nanos Research	October 22, 2021		30.8	29.9	23.1	7.3	5.3	2.7	—N/a	±3.1 pp	1,000	telephone (rolling)	0.9
Abacus Data	October 20, 2021		30	33	19	7	6	3	1	±1.9 pp	2,220	online	3
	September 27, 2021	Annamie Paul announces her intention to resign as the leader of the Green Party.											
2021 election	September 20, 2021	HTML	33.7	32.6	17.8	7.6	4.9	2.3	1.1	—N/a	17,042,591	—N/a	1.1

=== Voting intention with LPC-NDP merger/alliance ===
==== Under Justin Trudeau leadership ====
Polling firm	Last date of polling	Link	LPC-NDP	CPC	BQ	GPC	PPC	Others	Margin of error	Sample size	Polling method	Lead
Research Co.	January 5, 2025		31	48	10	6	3	2	± 3.1 pp	1,002	online	17
Research Co.	October 8, 2023		36	42	8	8	2	—N/a	± 3.1 pp	1,000	online	6
Leger	April 23, 2023		41	39	8	6	3	—N/a	± 3.1 pp	1,515	online	2

==== Under Jagmeet Singh leadership ====
Polling firm	Last date of polling	Link	LPC-NDP	CPC	BQ	GPC	PPC	Others	Margin of error	Sample size	Polling method	Lead
Research Co.	January 5, 2025		34	46	10	5	3	2	± 3.1 pp	1,002	online	12
Research Co.	October 8, 2023		36	43	9	7	2	—N/a	± 3.1 pp	1,000	online	7

=== Voting intention with Liberal successor candidates ===
==== Under Mark Carney leadership ====
Polling firm	Last date of polling	Link	CPC	LPC	NDP	BQ	GPC	PPC	Others	Margin of error	Sample size	Polling method	Lead
	March 9, 2025	Mark Carney is elected leader of the Liberal Party.											
Ekos	March 5, 2025		35.3	42.4	10.7	5.5	1	4.1	1	±3.1 pp	1,033	IVR	7.1
Angus Reid	March 3, 2025		40	37	11	9	2	0	1	—N/a	905	online	3
Leger	March 2, 2025		41	33	12	6	2	4	2	±2.49 pp	1,548	online	8
Ekos	February 24, 2025		31.5	42.1	8.2	10.5	3	4	1	±7.1 pp	193	IVR	10.6
Pollara	February 24, 2025		37	37	14	7	3	1	0	±2.5 pp	1,506	online	0
Leger	February 23, 2025		38	40	11	5	3	2	1	±2.50 pp	1,244	online	2
Angus Reid	February 18, 2025		40	37	10	7	4	1	3	—N/a	921	online	3
Leger	February 17, 2025		40	39	9	6	3	2	1	—N/a	1,227	online	1
Mainstreet Research	February 13, 2025		37	40	12	9	2	1	0	±2.9 pp	1,128	text/online	3
Abacus Data	February 11, 2025		45	28	12	10	3	—N/a	2	±3.5 pp	757-852	online	17
Leger	February 10, 2025		37	37	12	6	5	2	2	±2.46 pp	1,590	online	0
Pallas Data	February 6, 2025		38	39	9	7	3	2	2	±2.8 pp	1,241	IVR	1
Angus Reid	January 27, 2025		43	29	13	10	3	1	1	±1.5 pp	1,960	online	14
Angus Reid	December 31, 2024		36	14	18	9	23			±1.5 pp	2,406	online	18

==== Under Chrystia Freeland leadership ====
Polling firm	Last date of polling	Link	CPC	LPC	NDP	BQ	GPC	PPC	Others	Margin of error	Sample size	Polling method	Lead
Angus Reid	March 3, 2025		39	31	13	7	3	3	9	—N/a	884	online	8
Angus Reid	February 18, 2025		40	29	18	8	3	2	6	—N/a	893	online	11
Mainstreet Research	February 13, 2025		40	34	12	9	2	1	2	±2.9 pp	1,128	text/online	6
Abacus Data	February 11, 2025		45	21	20	7	6	—N/a	3	±3.5 pp	757-852	online	24
Leger	February 10, 2025		39	28	15	7	6	3	2	±2.46 pp	1,590	online	11
Pallas Data	February 6, 2025		41	31	13	8	2	3	2	±2.8 pp	1,241	IVR	10
Angus Reid	January 27, 2025		44	24	17	9	3	1	2	±1.5 pp	1,960	online	20
Angus Reid	December 31, 2024		36	21	14	7	21			±1.5 pp	2,406	online	15

==== Under Karina Gould leadership ====
Polling firm	Last date of polling	Link	CPC	LPC	NDP	BQ	GPC	PPC	Others	Margin of error	Sample size	Polling method	Lead
Mainstreet Research	February 13, 2025		40	33	13	10	2	1	2	±2.9 pp	1,128	text/online	7
Pallas Data	February 6, 2025		42	22	17	10	4	3	2	±2.8 pp	1,241	IVR	20

== Regional polls ==
A number of polling firms survey federal voting intentions on a regional or provincial level. Note that this section displays results from stand-alone polls, not subsets of national polls.

=== Atlantic Canada ===
Polling firm	Last date of polling	Link	LPC	CPC	NDP	GPC	PPC	Others	Margin of error	Sample size	Polling method	Lead
Narrative Research	April 22, 2025		66	26	6	1	1	0	± 2.7 pp	1,325	Online	40
Narrative Research	April 13, 2025		65	26	8	1	0	0	± 2.7 pp	1,361	Online	39
Narrative Research	August 18, 2024		32	43	16	6	2	0	± 2.6 pp	1,450	Telephone	11

==== New Brunswick ====
Polling firm	Last date of polling	Link	LPC	CPC	NDP	GPC	PPC	Others	Margin of error	Sample size	Polling method	Lead
Narrative Research	August 18, 2024		32	43	10	10	4	0	± 2.6 pp	400	Telephone	11

==== Nova Scotia ====
Polling firm	Last date of polling	Link	LPC	CPC	NDP	GPC	PPC	Others	Margin of error	Sample size	Polling method	Lead
Abacus Data	March 20, 2025		46	37	12	3	2	1	± 4.1 pp	600	Online	9
Cardinal Research	November 15, 2024		40	37	17	3	1	—N/a	± 3.5 pp	1046	Telephone	3
Narrative Research	August 18, 2024		30	43	21	4	2	0	± 2.6 pp	400	Telephone	13

==== Newfoundland and Labrador ====
Polling firm	Last date of polling	Link	LPC	CPC	NDP	GPC	PPC	Others	Margin of error	Sample size	Polling method	Lead
Narrative Research	August 18, 2024		32	45	19	3	0	0	± 2.6 pp	350	Telephone	13
Abacus Data	September 25, 2023		33	42	23	—N/a	1	1	± 4.5 pp	500	Online	9

==== Prince Edward Island ====
Polling firm	Last date of polling	Link	LPC	CPC	NDP	GPC	PPC	Others	Margin of error	Sample size	Polling method	Lead
Narrative Research	August 18, 2024		35	41	10	13	1	0	± 2.6 pp	300	Telephone	6

=== Central Canada ===
==== Quebec ====
Polling firm	Last date of polling	Link	LPC	CPC	NDP	BQ	GPC	PPC	Others	Margin of error	Sample size	Polling method	Lead
Leger	April 25, 2025		42	24	5	26	2	1	—N/a		893	Online	16
Synopsis	April 11, 2025		42	21	7	27	1	2	—N/a		1,000	Online	15
Leger	March 10, 2025		36	24	8	25	4	2	1	± 3.09pp	1,007	Online	11
Leger	February 2, 2025		29	24	12	29	3	3	1	± 3.07 pp	1,017	Online	0
Leger	January 19, 2025		21	26	7	37	4	2	1	± 3.09 pp	1,003	Online	11
Leger	December 2, 2024		22	22	15	35	4	1	2	± 3.1 pp	1,002	Online	13
Leger	November 11, 2024		22	24	13	35	3	3	0	± 3.08 pp	1,010	Online	11
Leger	October 6, 2024		27	22	11	35	3	1	0	± 3.04 pp	1,041	Online	8
Leger	August 25, 2024		27	23	14	29	5	3	0	± 3.04 pp	1,041	Online	2
Leger	June 3, 2024		26	26	11	31	4	1	1	± 3.08 pp	1,015	Online	5
Leger	April 21, 2024		26	24	10	35	2	2	1	± 3.05 pp	1,026	Online	9
Pallas Data	April 8, 2024		25.3	26.2	9.9	28.6	0.7	2.2	0.6	± 2 pp	700	IVR	2.4
Leger	March 18, 2024		27	23	14	30	3	2	1	± 3.05 pp	1,033	Online	3
Leger	February 6, 2024		28	24	14	29	3	2	1	± 3.05 pp	1,032	Online	1
Leger	December 4, 2023		28	25	10	31	2	2	2	± 3.04 pp	846	Online	3
Pallas Data	September 27, 2023		34	25	7	28	3	2	1	± 2.96 pp	1,095	IVR	6
Leger	September 25, 2023		29	23	13	29	2	1	—N/a	± 3.0 pp	1,046	Online	0
Leger	February 26, 2023		33	15	13	31	4	2	—N/a	± 3.0 pp	1,044	Online	2
Leger	November 6, 2022		34	18	12	30	2	2	—N/a	± 3.1 pp	1,028	Online	4

==== Ontario ====
Polling firm	Last date of polling	Link	LPC	CPC	NDP	GPC	PPC	Others	Margin of error (Note: In cases when linked poll details distinguish between the margin of error associated with the total sample of respondents (including undecided and non-voters) and that of the subsample of decided/leaning voters, the former is included in the table. Also not included is the margin of error created by rounding to the nearest whole number or any margin of error from methodological sources. Most online polls (because of their opt-in method of recruiting panelists which results in a non-random sample) cannot have a margin of error. In such cases, shown is what the margin of error would be for a survey using a random probability-based sample of equivalent size.)	Sample size (Note: Refers to the total, "raw" sample size, including undecided and non-voters, and before demographic weighting is applied. Fractions in parentheses apply to rolling polls (see below) and indicate the proportion of the sample that is independent from the previous poll in the series.)	Polling method (Note: "Telephone" refers to traditional telephone polls conducted by live interviewers; "IVR" refers to automated Interactive Voice Response polls conducted by telephone; "online" refers to polls conducted exclusively over the internet; "telephone/online" refers to polls which combine results from both telephone and online surveys, or for which respondents are initially recruited by telephone and then asked to complete an online survey. "Rolling" polls contain overlapping data from one poll to the next.)	Lead
Campaign Research (Ontario PC internal)	March 26, 2025		48	33	11	4	-	4		1902	online	15
Mainstreet Research	February 17, 2025		41	39	13	2	2	2	± 2.7 pp	1,278 (1/3)	online (rolling)	2
Mainstreet Research	February 16, 2025		42	38	14	2	2	1	± 2.8 pp	1,229 (1/3)	online (rolling)	4
Mainstreet Research	February 15, 2025		41	39	13	2	2	2	± 2.8 pp	1,228 (1/3)	online (rolling)	2
Mainstreet Research	February 14, 2025		43	39	10	2	3	1	± 2.7 pp	1,272 (1/3)	online (rolling)	4
Mainstreet Research	February 13, 2025		43	41	8	3	2	2	± 2.7 pp	1,294 (1/3)	online (rolling)	2
Mainstreet Research	February 12, 2025		43	40	10	2	2	2	± 2.7 pp	1,314 (1/3)	online (rolling)	3
Mainstreet Research	February 11, 2025		43	39	10	2	2	2	± 2.7 pp	1,303 (1/3)	online (rolling)	4
Mainstreet Research	February 10, 2025		45	37	12	2	1	2	± 2.7 pp	1,301 (1/3)	online (rolling)	8
Mainstreet Research	February 9, 2025		43	39	9	5	2	2	± 2.7 pp	1,347 (1/3)	online (rolling)	4
Mainstreet Research	February 8, 2025		42	36	13	4	2	2	± 2.8 pp	1,187 (1/3)	online (rolling)	6
Mainstreet Research	February 7, 2025		44	36	12	4	2	2	± 2.8 pp	1,262 (1/3)	online (rolling)	8
Mainstreet Research	February 6, 2025		42	36	14	3	2	2	± 2.5 pp	1,515 (1/4)	online (rolling)	6
Mainstreet Research	February 5, 2025		42	37	12	4	2	2	± 2.8 pp	1,236 (1/3)	online (rolling)	5
Mainstreet Research	February 4, 2025		42	37	11	4	2	2	± 2.9 pp	1,162 (1/3)	online (rolling)	5
Mainstreet Research	February 3, 2025		43	39	9	4	2	2	± 3.0 pp	1,080 (1/3)	online (rolling)	4
Mainstreet Research	February 2, 2025		42	39	11	3	2	2	± 2.6 pp	1,374 (1/3)	online (rolling)	3
Mainstreet Research	February 1, 2025		41	40	13	3	2	2	± 2.9 pp	1,124 (1/3)	online (rolling)	1
Mainstreet Research	January 31, 2025		39	39	14	3	1	2	± 2.8 pp	1,247 (1/3)	online (rolling)	0
Mainstreet Research	January 30, 2025		40	39	13	5	2	2	± 2.4 pp	1,644 (1/3)	online (rolling)	1
Mainstreet Research	January 26, 2025		40	38	12	4	2	2	± 3.2 pp	936	online	2
Abacus Data	June 25, 2024		27	44	19	5	—N/a	5	± 3.1 pp	1,000	online	17
Abacus Data	May 15, 2024		29	45	17	4	—N/a	5	± 3.1 pp	1,000	online	16

===== City of Toronto =====
Polling firm	Last date of polling	Link	LPC	CPC	NDP	GPC	PPC	Others	Margin of error	Sample size	Polling method	Lead
Liaison Strategies	October 8, 2024		35	34	25	3	3	—N/a	± 3.37 pp	848	IVR	1
Angus Reid	April 23, 2024		32	38	23	4	1	2	± 2 pp	158	online	6
Abacus Data	March 6, 2024		33	41	18	—N/a	—N/a	—N/a	—N/a	958	online	8
Liaison Strategies	January 4, 2024		38	32	22	5	3	—N/a	± 3.39 pp	831	IVR	6
Liaison Strategies	October 4, 2023		40	29	24	4	3	—N/a	± 3.43 pp	817	IVR	11
Abacus Data	February 7, 2023		44	27	18	6	5	1	± 3.1 pp	1,000	online	17

===== Peel Region =====
Polling firm	Last date of polling	Link	LPC	CPC	NDP	GPC	PPC	Others	Margin of error	Sample size	Polling method	Lead
Mainstreet Research	February 4, 2024		36.4	42.3	15.3	3.1	1.6	0.3	± 2.8 pp	1,183	IVR	5.9

===== City of Mississauga =====
Polling firm	Last date of polling	Link	LPC	CPC	NDP	GPC	PPC	Others	Margin of error	Sample size	Polling method	Lead
Mainstreet Research	April 4, 2025		39.2	38	14.0	2.3	1.6	0.1	—N/a	661	IVR	1.2
Liaison Strategies	January 11, 2024		44	36	15	3	5	—N/a	± 3.06 pp	983	IVR	8

=== Western Canada ===
==== Manitoba ====
Polling firm	Last date of polling	Link	LPC	CPC	NDP	GPC	PPC	Others	Margin of error	Sample size	Polling method	Lead
Probe Research	April 14, 2025		43	40	15	1	1	—N/a	± 3.5 pp	800	IVR + online	3
Probe Research	March 16, 2025		44	42	9	2	2	—N/a	± 3.1 pp	1,000	IVR + online	2
Probe Research	February 6, 2025		28	45	22	3	2	—N/a	± 4.0 pp	600	IVR + online	17
Probe Research	December 10, 2024		19	52	24	2	2	—N/a	± 3.1 pp	1,000	IVR + online	28
Probe Research	September 15, 2024		21	50	24	2	3	—N/a	± 3.1 pp	1,000	IVR + online	26
Probe Research	March 18, 2024		23	47	26	2	—N/a	1	± 3.1 pp	1,000	IVR + online	21

==== Saskatchewan ====
Polling firm	Last date of polling	Link	LPC	CPC	NDP	GPC	PPC	Others	Margin of error	Sample size	Polling method	Lead
Rubicon Strategy	April 10, 2025		25	38	11	2.5	2.5	21 (20 undecided)	± 4 pp	747	Online	13

==== Alberta ====
Polling firm	Last date of polling	Link	LPC	CPC	NDP	GPC	PPC	Others	Margin of error	Sample size	Polling method	Lead
Leger	January 26, 2025		14	64	16	3	2	1	± 3.1 pp	1,002	Online	48
Leger	August 5, 2024		14	61	18	3	2	1	± 3.1 pp	1,005	Online	43
Leger	March 24, 2024		14	60	20	3	2	1	± 3.1 pp	1,002	Online	40
Mainstreet Research	May 2, 2023		18	55	13	1	3	1	± 2.5 pp	1,524	Smart IVR	37
Yorkville Strategies	March 9, 2022		18	48	20	4	7	3	± 4 pp	600	Phone	28

==== British Columbia ====
Polling firm	Last date of polling	Link	LPC	CPC	NDP	GPC	PPC	Others	Margin of error (Note: In cases when linked poll details distinguish between the margin of error associated with the total sample of respondents (including undecided and non-voters) and that of the subsample of decided/leaning voters, the former is included in the table. Also not included is the margin of error created by rounding to the nearest whole number or any margin of error from methodological sources. Most online polls (because of their opt-in method of recruiting panelists which results in a non-random sample) cannot have a margin of error. In such cases, shown is what the margin of error would be for a survey using a random probability-based sample of equivalent size.)	Sample size (Note: Refers to the total, "raw" sample size, including undecided and non-voters, and before demographic weighting is applied. Fractions in parentheses apply to rolling polls (see below) and indicate the proportion of the sample that is independent from the previous poll in the series.)	Polling method (Note: "Telephone" refers to traditional telephone polls conducted by live interviewers; "IVR" refers to automated Interactive Voice Response polls conducted by telephone; "online" refers to polls conducted exclusively over the internet; "telephone/online" refers to polls which combine results from both telephone and online surveys, or for which respondents are initially recruited by telephone and then asked to complete an online survey. "Rolling" polls contain overlapping data from one poll to the next.)	Lead
Abacus Data	May 9, 2024		18	44	26	8	—N/a	3	± 3.1 pp	1,000	online	18
Mainstreet Research	April 24, 2024		17.8	55.8	15.8	6.9	—N/a	3.7	± 3.2 pp	962	Smart IVR	38
Mainstreet Research	March 19, 2024		22.8	49.6	19.4	5.8	—N/a	2.4	± 3 pp	1,063	Smart IVR	26.8
Angus Reid	March 6, 2024		21	40	29	9	—N/a	2	± 3 pp	809	online	11

== Leadership polls ==
Aside from conducting the usual opinion surveys on general party preferences, polling firms also survey public opinion on which political party leader would make the best prime minister:

=== March 2025 – April 2025 ===
Campaign Period Leadership Polling for the 2025 Canadian Federal Election, on which political party leader would make the best prime minister (LOESS Trendline included).

Polling firm	Last date of polling	Link	Mark Carney	Pierre Poilievre	Jagmeet Singh	Yves-François Blanchet	Elizabeth May/Jonathan Pedneault (Note: Depending on the pollster, this figure may be solely for May, solely for Pedneault, or a joint rating for both leaders. Some pollsters include separate figures for both May and Pedneault; in such cases, only the rating for May is included.)	Maxime Bernier	Unsure	Margin of error	Lead
Nanos Research	April 27, 2025		51.9	32.1	5.8	3.1	0.9	1.1	3.0	±3.4 pp	19.8
Research Co.	April 27, 2025		45	35	7	3	1	2	7	±3.1 pp	10
Abacus Data	April 27, 2025		40	37	10	—N/a	—N/a	—N/a	8	±2.0 pp	3
Nanos Research	April 26, 2025		48.5	35.2	4.5	2.8	1.1	1.0	4.4	±2.4 pp	13.3
Innovative Research	April 26, 2025		44	37	11	4	3	2	0	—N/a	7
Angus Reid	April 26, 2025		47	31	—N/a	—N/a	—N/a	—N/a	7	±2 pp	16
Nanos Research	April 25, 2025		46.8	34.1	5.8	3.2	1.0	1.1	5.2	±2.7 pp	12.7
Leger	April 25, 2025		40	31	6	—N/a	2	2	9	±2.53 pp	9
Nanos Research	April 24, 2025		46.2	34.7	4.8	3.1	1.2	1.2	5.9	±2.7 pp	11.5
Nanos Research	April 23, 2025		46.3	36.9	4.5	2.5	1.3	1.5	4.8	±2.7 pp	9.4
Innovative Research	April 23, 2025		42	38	10	4	3	3	0	—N/a	4
Nanos Research	April 22, 2025		48.9	35.4	4.0	2.4	1.9	1.2	4.5	±2.7 pp	13.5
Nanos Research	April 21, 2025		47.3	34.5	5.6	3.1	1.9	1.3	4.8	±2.7 pp	12.8
Abacus Data	April 21, 2025		41	35	10	—N/a	—N/a	—N/a	10	±2.3 pp	6
Leger	April 21, 2025		41	31	6	—N/a	2	2	10	±2.45 pp	10
Innovative Research	April 21, 2025		39	40	10	4	3	3	0	—N/a	1
Angus Reid	April 21, 2025		49	31	—N/a	—N/a	—N/a	—N/a	8	±1.5 pp	18
Research Co.	April 20, 2025		45	35	8	3	1	1	7	±3.1 pp	10
Nanos Research	April 20, 2025		47.4	33.2	6.0	3.5	1.7	1.4	5.3	±2.7 pp	14.2
Innovative Research	April 20, 2025		43	37	10	4	3	3	0	—N/a	6
Ipsos	April 19, 2025		41	36	11	5	2	5	0	±3.8 pp	5
MQO Research	April 19, 2025		43	32	8	3	—N/a	—N/a	12	±2 pp	11
Nanos Research	April 19, 2025		45.3	34.3	6.5	3.5	1.2	1.2	6.5	±2.7 pp	11
Nanos Research	April 17, 2025		48.0	33.6	4.9	2.9	1.2	0.9	6.6	±2.7 pp	14.4
Nanos Research	April 16, 2025		47.4	33.9	4.7	2.9	1.2	1.0	7.3	±2.7 pp	13.5
Abacus Data	April 15, 2025		40	34	10	—N/a	2	2	11	±2.9 pp	6
Nanos Research	April 15, 2025		49.4	32.6	4.2	2.8	1.4	1.2	6.2	±2.7 pp	16.8
Nanos Research	April 14, 2025		48.9	33.1	4.2	2.6	1.1	1.7	6.4	±2.7 pp	15.8
Leger	April 14, 2025		38	30	7	—N/a	2	2	11	±1.79 pp	8
Innovative Research	April 14, 2025		44	38	10	2	3	3	0	—N/a	6
Nanos Research	April 13, 2025		49.8	34.3	4.3	2.4	1.3	1.6	4.1	±2.7 pp	15.5
Angus Reid	April 13, 2025		49	30	—N/a	—N/a	—N/a	—N/a	8	±2 pp	19
MQO Research	April 12, 2025		43	30	11	2	—N/a	—N/a	12	±2.3 pp	13
Nanos Research	April 12, 2025		48.7	35.0	4.0	2.7	1.6	1.4	4.2	±2.7 pp	13.7
Nanos Research	April 11, 2025		48.0	34.4	4.7	3.0	2.2	1.2	4.0	±2.8 pp	13.6
Nanos Research	April 10, 2025		47.3	34.4	4.4	2.8	2.1	0.9	4.8	±2.8 pp	12.9
Ipsos	April 10, 2025		41	36	12	5	2	4	0	±3.8 pp	5
Abacus Data	April 10, 2025		43	34	9	—N/a	2	2	10	±2.31 pp	9
Nanos Research	April 9, 2025		46.7	34.5	4.5	3.0	2.1	1.3	4.9	±2.8 pp	12.2
Nanos Research	April 8, 2025		47.4	34.3	4.7	2.8	1.5	1.2	5.5	±2.8 pp	13.1
Abacus Data	April 8, 2025		41	34	9	—N/a	3	3	13	±2.1 pp	7
Nanos Research	April 7, 2025		48.6	33.3	4.6	2.9	1.5	1.9	5.2	±2.8 pp	15.3
Angus Reid	April 7, 2025		50	28	—N/a	—N/a	—N/a	—N/a	9	±2 pp	22
Innovative Research	April 7, 2025		45	36	11	3	3	3	—N/a	—N/a	9
Research Co.	April 6, 2025		43	29	9	4	1	2	12	±3.1 pp	14
Leger	April 6, 2025		37	27	8	—N/a	2	2	13	±2.43 pp	10
Nanos Research	April 6, 2025		49.8	32.1	4.4	2.5	1.5	1.8	5.9	±2.8 pp	17.7
MQO Research	April 6, 2025		42	29	11	2	—N/a	—N/a	12	±2.5 pp	13
Nanos Research	April 5, 2025		50.2	31.0	3.8	3.0	1.9	1.9	5.6	±2.8 pp	19.2
Nanos Research	April 4, 2025		51.6	29.2	4.5	2.8	2.2	1.5	5.8	±2.8 pp	22.4
Ipsos	April 3, 2025		45	32	12	5	3	3	0	±3.8 pp	13
Nanos Research	April 3, 2025		50.9	30.9	4.7	2.8	2.1	1.5	5.0	±2.8 pp	20
Abacus Data	April 3, 2025		38	33	11	—N/a	3	2	12	±2.3 pp	5
Nanos Research	April 2, 2025		50.0	32.8	4.7	2.8	1.9	1.4	5.3	±2.8 pp	17.2
Nanos Research	April 1, 2025		48.7	33.9	5.3	2.6	1.6	1.1	5.4	±2.8 pp	14.8
Nanos Research	March 31, 2025		48.7	34.1	4.5	3.0	1.3	1.6	5.4	±2.8 pp	14.6
Innovative Research	March 31, 2025		33	32	9	3	2	2	14	—N/a	1
Leger	March 31, 2025		37	28	6	—N/a	2	2	14	±1.79 pp	9
Nanos Research	March 30, 2025		47.4	32.7	4.9	2.3	2.1	2.2	6.8	±2.8 pp	14.7
Nanos Research	March 29, 2025		47.7	32.0	4.3	2.2	2.2	2.7	6.4	±2.7 pp	15.7
MQO Research	March 29, 2025		40	30	10	2	—N/a	—N/a	14	±2.4 pp	10
Ipsos	March 26, 2025		44	33	8	3	5	3	4	±3.1 pp	11
Research Co.	March 24, 2025		39	33	9	3	2	2	12	±3.1 pp	6
Angus Reid	March 24, 2025		52	28	—N/a	—N/a	—N/a	—N/a	8	±2 pp	24
Leger	March 23, 2025		39	28	5	—N/a	3	2	14	±2.45 pp	11
Nanos Research	March 21, 2025		33.9	31.8	6.9	4.4	3.3	2.0	17.6	±3.0 pp	2.1
Innovative Research	March 21, 2025		34	27	10	3	3	4	16	—N/a	7
Abacus Data	March 20, 2025		38	34	9	—N/a	2	3	14	±2.5 pp	4
Ipsos	March 17, 2025		42	32	12	4	7	4	—N/a	±3.8 pp	10
Angus Reid	March 16, 2025		41	29	6	—N/a	—N/a	—N/a	—N/a	±1.5 pp	12
Nanos Research	March 14, 2025		30.7	31.4	8.6	5.1	3.1	2.0	19.1	±3.0 pp	0.7
Innovative Research	March 13, 2025		30	30	9	3	4	3	17	—N/a	0

=== November 2022 – March 2025 ===
Polling firm	Last date of polling	Link	Justin Trudeau	Pierre Poilievre	Jagmeet Singh	Yves-François Blanchet	Elizabeth May	Maxime Bernier	Unsure	Margin of error	Lead
Nanos Research	March 7, 2025		29.9	33.1	9.6	4.9	3.3	1.6	17.5	±3.0 pp	3.2
Nanos Research	February 28, 2025		29.5	35.1	9.6	5.4	3.7	1.3	15.5	±3.1 pp	5.6
Nanos Research	February 21, 2025		28.2	35.7	9.4	5.5	3.9	1.4	15.8	±3.1 pp	7.5
Nanos Research	February 14, 2025		25.1	38.0	8.4	5.0	4.9	1.2	17.3	±3.1 pp	12.9
Nanos Research	February 7, 2025		21.4	36.8	10.6	5.5	5.1	1.6	19.1	±3.1 pp	15.4
Nanos Research	January 31, 2025		17.1	38.2	11.8	4.5	5.6	1.4	21.3	±3.1 pp	21.1
Nanos Research	January 24, 2025		16.0	38.0	13.2	4.0	5.6	1.3	21.8	±3.1 pp	22.0
Nanos Research	January 17, 2025		14.0	39.7	14.8	4.6	5.2	1.9	19.9	±3.1 pp	25.7
Nanos Research	January 10, 2025		14.7	41.7	14.6	4.5	4.7	1.8	18.0	±3.1 pp	27.0
Research Co.	January 5, 2025		21	39	12	6	3	2	17	±3.1 pp	18
Nanos Research	January 3, 2025		17.5	40.5	13.9	4.3	4.7	2.6	16.6	±3.1 pp	23.0
Nanos Research	December 27, 2024		17.4	40.0	13.9	4.3	4.2	2.7	17.6	±3.1 pp	22.6
Leger	December 22, 2024		11	31	13	—N/a	4	3	15	±2.51 pp	18
Nanos Research	December 20, 2024		20.0	37.2	15.3	3.5	4.5	2.5	17.0	±3.1 pp	17.2
Nanos Research	December 13, 2024		18.6	36.0	16.5	3.1	4.4	2.6	18.8	±3.0 pp	17.4
Nanos Research	December 6, 2024		19.6	34.6	16.3	3.6	4.7	2.1	19.2	±3.0 pp	15.0
Leger	December 1, 2024		15	31	13	—N/a	3	2	13	±2.5 pp	16
Nanos Research	November 29, 2024		20.0	34.6	17.0	4.0	4.3	2.0	18.1	±3.0 pp	14.6
Nanos Research	November 22, 2024		20.2	35.4	15.1	4.5	5.0	2.0	17.7	±3.1 pp	15.2
Nanos Research	November 15, 2024		21.8	34.7	13.9	5.9	5.7	1.6	16.4	±3.0 pp	12.9
Nanos Research	November 8, 2024		21.9	35.1	14.6	6.2	5.1	1.5	15.7	±3.1 pp	13.2
Leger	November 3, 2024		17	30	11	—N/a	3	2	15	±2.49 pp	13
Nanos Research	November 1, 2024		21.3	35.5	14.6	5.9	6.3	1.7	14.8	±3.1 pp	14.2
Nanos Research	October 25, 2024		21.7	34.1	16.0	5.3	5.8	1.6	15.5	±3.0 pp	12.4
Nanos Research	October 18, 2024		21.6	33.7	17.0	4.8	5.0	1.9	16.0	±3.1 pp	12.1
Nanos Research	October 11, 2024		20.6	34.3	16.2	4.0	5.9	1.9	17.1	±3.1 pp	13.7
Nanos Research	October 4, 2024		19.5	34.8	16.8	4.2	4.8	1.6	18.2	±3.1 pp	15.3
Leger	September 29, 2024		18	31	13	—N/a	4	2	13	±2.43 pp	13
Nanos Research	September 27, 2024		19.4	35.1	18.5	4.0	5.3	1.7	16.0	±3.0 pp	15.7
Nanos Research	September 20, 2024		21.7	34.5	18.0	2.9	4.4	1.5	16.9	±3.0 pp	12.8
Nanos Research	September 13, 2024		20.8	34.5	19.1	4.0	3.7	1.4	16.5	±3.0 pp	13.7
Ipsos	September 9, 2024		26	45	23	6	—N/a	—N/a	—N/a	±3.8 pp	19
Nanos Research	September 6, 2024		23.0	32.7	17.0	4.0	4.8	1.8	16.7	±2.9 pp	9.7
Nanos Research	August 30, 2024		21.6	33.1	16.1	4.8	5.0	2.1	17.2	±2.9 pp	11.5
Nanos Research	August 23, 2024		20.3	33.7	16.1	5.6	5.7	2.2	16.4	±3 pp	13.4
Nanos Research	August 16, 2024		20.6	34.4	14.6	5.0	5.6	2.8	16.9	±3 pp	13.8
Research Co.	August 14, 2024		22	37	14	5	4	2	16	±3.1 pp	15
Nanos Research	August 9, 2024		19.7	34.9	16.1	5.0	5.0	2.2	17.2	±3.1 pp	15.2
Nanos Research	August 2, 2024		21.1	35.1	15.8	4.6	4.4	1.6	17.3	±3.1 pp	14.0
Leger	July 28, 2024		16	29	13	—N/a	4	2	14	±2.45 pp	13
Nanos Research	July 26, 2024		21.9	35.8	15.4	4.1	3.9	1.6	17.4	±3.0 pp	13.9
Nanos Research	July 19, 2024		23.3	35.3	15.0	4.7	4.0	1.5	16.2	±3.0 pp	12.0
Nanos Research	July 12, 2024		23.3	36.4	13.7	5.4	4.5	1.4	15.2	±2.9 pp	13.1
Nanos Research	July 5, 2024		22.0	35.8	14.4	5.9	4.3	2.0	15.6	±2.9 pp	13.8
Nanos Research	June 28, 2024		24.0	35.3	13.4	5.9	4.5	1.7	15.2	±3.0 pp	11.3
Leger	June 23, 2024		19	26	14	—N/a	3	2	14	±2.45 pp	7
Nanos Research	June 21, 2024		24.2	36.0	13.1	5.6	4.0	1.6	15.5	±3.0 pp	11.8
Angus Reid	June 17, 2024		14	33	14	—N/a	—N/a	—N/a	10	±2 pp	19
Ipsos	June 14, 2024		25	44	23	8	—N/a	—N/a	—N/a	±3.8 pp	19
Nanos Research	June 14, 2024		24.4	35.6	13.6	4.7	5.0	1.7	14.9	±3.0 pp	11.2
Nanos Research	June 7, 2024		25.1	36.2	15.0	4.4	5.0	1.4	12.9	±3.0 pp	11.1
Nanos Research	May 31, 2024		23.2	36.5	15.9	5.2	4.6	1.6	13.0	±2.9 pp	13.3
Leger	May 26, 2024		16	28	16	—N/a	3	3	14	±2.44 pp	12
Nanos Research	May 24, 2024		22.0	36.8	16.2	5.8	5.1	1.3	12.8	±3.0 pp	14.8
Nanos Research	May 17, 2024		21.8	38.2	12.9	5.9	4.8	2.2	14.2	±2.9 pp	16.4
Nanos Research	May 10, 2024		21.2	38.0	11.4	5.6	4.7	2.2	16.8	±2.9 pp	16.8
Nanos Research	May 3, 2024		19.8	36.5	11.6	4.2	5.2	2.1	20.6	±3 pp	16.7
Abacus Data	April 29, 2024		21	41	17	—N/a	—N/a	—N/a	21	±2.6 pp	20
Leger	April 28, 2024		16	32	11	—N/a	4	2	14	±2.44 pp	16
Nanos Research	April 26, 2024		19.0	37.1	12.5	4.7	3.9	2.4	20.4	±3 pp	18.1
Angus Reid	April 23, 2024		16	35	13	—N/a	—N/a	—N/a	10	±2 pp	19
Nanos Research	April 19, 2024		18.4	34.9	14.1	4.9	3.3	2.0	22.4	±3.1 pp	16.5
Ipsos	April 18, 2024		23	48	22	—N/a	—N/a	—N/a	—N/a	±3.8 pp	25
Nanos Research	April 12, 2024		19.8	33.9	16.8	5.6	3.7	1.4	18.8	±3 pp	14.1
Research Co.	April 10, 2024		26	32	17	6	3	1	16	±3.1 pp	6
Nanos Research	April 5, 2024		21.1	32.0	17.0	5.9	4.9	2.7	16.5	±3 pp	10.9
Nanos Research	March 29, 2024		21.5	33.4	14.8	6.0	5.3	2.0	17.1	±3 pp	11.9
Leger	March 25, 2024		17	29	17	—N/a	3	1	15	±2.45 pp	12
Nanos Research	March 22, 2024		19.7	33.7	16.9	5.2	4.6	1.7	18.2	±3 pp	14.0
Nanos Research	March 15, 2024		19.9	33.5	16.2	4.6	4.6	1.8	19.4	±3 pp	13.6
Nanos Research	March 8, 2024		18.8	34.9	17.2	4.5	3.8	2.1	18.6	±3.1 pp	16.1
Angus Reid	March 4, 2024		17	31	15	—N/a	—N/a	—N/a	10	±2 pp	14
Nanos Research	March 1, 2024		19.2	36.9	17.0	3.8	2.7	1.7	18.7	±3.1 pp	17.7
Leger	February 25, 2024		17	27	16	—N/a	4	2	14	±2.49 pp	10
Nanos Research	February 23, 2024		18.6	36.3	16.9	3.9	3.7	1.6	19.0	±3.1 pp	17.7
Abacus Data	February 21, 2024		45	55	—N/a	—N/a	—N/a	—N/a	—N/a	±2.1 pp	10
Nanos Research	February 16, 2024		20.3	35.8	15.0	3.9	3.8	1.9	19.3	±3.1 pp	15.5
Nanos Research	February 9, 2024		20.8	36.2	14.5	4.0	4.0	1.9	18.6	±3.1 pp	15.4
Nanos Research	February 2, 2024		20.8	35.1	13.8	4.4	4.3	2.2	19.3	±3.1 pp	14.3
Leger	January 26, 2024		18	27	16	—N/a	3	2	16	±2.47 pp	9
Nanos Research	January 26, 2024		22.8	33.4	14.3	4.1	3.3	2.3	19.8	±3.1 pp	10.6
Abacus Data	January 23, 2024		46	54	—N/a	—N/a	—N/a	—N/a	—N/a	±2.1 pp	8
Ipsos	January 22, 2024		30	40	24	6	—N/a	—N/a	—N/a	±3.8 pp	10
Nanos Research	January 19, 2024		22.4	32.3	15.7	4.6	3.4	1.8	19.8	±3.1 pp	9.9
Nanos Research	January 12, 2024		22.0	31.4	15.6	4.1	4.1	1.6	21.3	±3.1 pp	9.4
Nanos Research	January 5, 2024		21.2	31.4	16.3	3.8	4.2	1.6	21.6	±3.1 pp	10.2
Nanos Research	December 29, 2023		21.4	33.0	15.2	3.3	4.5	1.4	21.2	±3.1 pp	11.6
Nanos Research	December 22, 2023		20.6	34.3	15.4	3.2	4.0	1.8	20.9	±3.1 pp	13.7
Leger	December 17, 2023		20	25	16	—N/a	3	1	15	±2.43 pp	5
Nanos Research	December 15, 2023		20.8	33.4	17.4	3.2	4.2	1.9	19.2	±3.1 pp	12.6
Nanos Research	December 8, 2023		20.9	32.8	16.2	3.5	4.3	1.8	20.5	±3.1 pp	11.9
Innovative Research	December 5, 2023		23	41	21	6	5	4	—N/a	—N/a	18
Angus Reid	December 1, 2023		16	34	13	—N/a	—N/a	—N/a	10	±1.5 pp	18
Nanos Research	December 1, 2023		19.1	33.4	16.8	3.9	4.8	1.9	20.1	±3.1 pp	14.3
Research Co.	November 27, 2023		23	32	18	4	4	2	18	±3.1 pp	9
Leger	November 26, 2023		19	25	17	—N/a	3	2	16	±2.51 pp	6
Nanos Research	November 24, 2023		19.0	34.1	16.2	3.6	5.7	1.7	19.7	±3.1 pp	15.1
Nanos Research	November 17, 2023		19.2	33.1	15.5	4.0	5.0	2.0	21.2	±3.1 pp	13.9
Leger	November 12, 2023		17	27	16	—N/a	2	2	18	±2.44 pp	10
Nanos Research	November 10, 2023		21.2	33.7	16.1	3.8	5.4	1.7	18.0	±3.1 pp	12.6
Nanos Research	November 3, 2023		22.7	34.1	16.0	3.7	4.5	1.8	17.2	±3.1 pp	11.4
Innovative Research	October 31, 2023		24	39	23	5	4	5	—N/a	—N/a	15
Leger	October 29, 2023		18	29	15	—N/a	4	2	17	±2.4 pp	11
Nanos Research	October 27, 2023		23.3	31.5	17.8	3.5	4.6	2.1	17.2	±3.1 pp	8.2
Nanos Research	October 20, 2023		23.0	32.6	16.8	2.9	5.1	2.2	17.4	±3.1 pp	9.6
Angus Reid	October 13, 2023		16	30	15	—N/a	—N/a	—N/a	11	±2 pp	14
Nanos Research	October 13, 2023		23.3	32.9	15.2	3.2	4.7	2.5	18.3	±3.1 pp	9.6
Nanos Research	October 6, 2023		23.5	32.1	15.0	3.4	4.7	2.3	19.0	±3.1 pp	8.6
Nanos Research	September 29, 2023		23.0	32.1	15.6	3.7	4.2	2.0	19.4	±3.1 pp	9.1
Leger	September 24, 2023		20	26	14	—N/a	2	2	17	±2.4 pp	6
Nanos Research	September 22, 2023		23.9	31.3	16.5	3.7	3.9	2.2	18.6	±3.1 pp	7.4
Ipsos	September 18, 2023		31	40	22	6	—N/a	—N/a	—N/a	±2.9 pp	9
Nanos Research	September 15, 2023		24.6	30.7	16.7	3.2	4.1	2.1	18.7	±3.1 pp	6.1
Nanos Research	September 8, 2023		25.4	28.9	16.9	3.2	4.3	2.9	18.4	±3.1 pp	3.5
Angus Reid	September 6, 2023		17	32	15	—N/a	—N/a	—N/a	11	±1.5 pp	15
Research Co.	September 4, 2023		28	28	17	4	3	1	20	±3.1 pp	0
Nanos Research	September 1, 2023		27.7	27.2	15.9	3.5	4.6	2.6	18.6	±3.1 pp	0.5
Nanos Research	August 25, 2023		27.5	27.5	16.1	3.9	5.1	2.4	17.6	±3.1 pp	0
Nanos Research	August 18, 2023		28.2	27.5	16.9	4.3	4.5	2.1	15.9	±3.1 pp	0.7
Nanos Research	August 11, 2023		28.0	27.8	16.3	4.1	5.0	1.5	17.3	±3.1 pp	0.2
Nanos Research	August 4, 2023		27.9	28.6	16.0	4.2	4.3	1.8	17.3	±3.1 pp	0.7
Nanos Research	July 28, 2023		25.9	28.4	15.3	4.4	4.0	2.5	19.5	±3.1 pp	2.5
Nanos Research	July 21, 2023		25.8	26.7	16.5	4.3	4.1	3.2	19.5	±3.1 pp	0.9
Nanos Research	July 14, 2023		26.3	28.2	16.9	3.6	3.7	2.9	18.3	±3.1 pp	1.9
Nanos Research	July 7, 2023		25.8	29.1	17.5	3.4	3.5	2.7	18.0	±3.1 pp	3.3
Nanos Research	June 30, 2023		27.2	28.4	17.8	3.4	3.4	2.4	17.3	±3.1 pp	1.2
Nanos Research	June 23, 2023		27.3	28.0	16.6	3.7	3.4	2.8	18.0	±3.1 pp	0.7
Nanos Research	June 16, 2023		27.1	27.5	17.9	3.5	3.0	2.4	18.5	±3.1 pp	0.4
Nanos Research	June 9, 2023		27.6	25.8	18.5	3.8	3.1	2.6	18.7	±3.1 pp	1.8
Nanos Research	June 2, 2023		26.8	26.6	19.1	3.7	2.5	2.4	18.9	±3.1 pp	0.2
Nanos Research	May 26, 2023		25.9	26.6	20.1	3.9	2.5	2.2	19.0	±3.1 pp	0.7
Nanos Research	May 19, 2023		25.9	27.3	19.1	4.2	2.9	2.2	18.4	±3.1 pp	1.4
Nanos Research	May 12, 2023		24.3	28.6	18.7	4.0	3.4	2.6	18.3	±3.1 pp	4.3
Leger	May 8, 2023		24	19	16	—N/a	3	2	—N/a	±2.51 pp	5
Nanos Research	May 5, 2023		23.9	28.3	18.8	4.5	3.4	2.8	18.3	±3.1 pp	4.4
Nanos Research	April 28, 2023		25.6	28.1	18.1	4.4	3.3	2.8	18.1	±3.1 pp	2.5
Nanos Research	April 21, 2023		25.3	27.5	18.4	3.8	3.4	2.5	19.1	±3.1 pp	2.2
Nanos Research	April 14, 2023		25.9	26.9	18.1	3.7	3.3	2.2	19.8	±3.1 pp	1.0
Leger	April 11, 2023		23	21	17	—N/a	3	3	—N/a	±2.52 pp	2
Nanos Research	April 7, 2023		26.2	28.4	16.0	4.0	3.5	2.8	18.9	±3.1 pp	2.2
Nanos Research	March 31, 2023		25.3	29.4	15.5	4.2	3.7	3.4	18.6	±3.1 pp	4.1
Nanos Research	March 24, 2023		25.9	28.7	16.1	4.4	3.8	3.9	17.2	±3.1 pp	2.8
Nanos Research	March 17, 2023		25.6	29.6	15.1	5.3	4.2	3.9	16.3	±3.1 pp	4.0
Leger	March 12, 2023		24	19	18	—N/a	2	2	—N/a	±2.49 pp	5
Nanos Research	March 10, 2023		27.5	27.3	15.8	5.5	3.9	3.3	16.6	±3.1 pp	0.2
Nanos Research	March 3, 2023		28.4	27	16.2	4.9	4.3	2.6	17.1	±3.1 pp	1.4
Research Co.	February 27, 2023		33	25	15	3	3	1	20	±3.1 pp	8
Nanos Research	February 24, 2023		31.4	26.7	14.2	5.0	4.5	2.2	16.1	±3.1 pp	4.7
Nanos Research	February 17, 2023		32.3	26.1	16.1	3.8	2.9	2.1	16.8	±3.1 pp	6.2
Leger	February 12, 2023		24	21	17	—N/a	3	2	—N/a	±2.5 pp	3
Nanos Research	February 10, 2023		32.8	25.8	15.8	3.6	3.5	2.0	16.3	±3.1 pp	7.0
Nanos Research	February 3, 2023		31.9	26.3	14.6	4.2	4.1	1.8	17.2	±3.1 pp	5.6
Nanos Research	January 27, 2023		30.4	26.3	16.1	4.5	3.8	1.9	17.0	±3.1 pp	4.1
Nanos Research	January 20, 2023		30.2	27.1	15.2	4.7	3.9	2	16.8	±3.1 pp	3.1
Nanos Research	January 13, 2023		30	27.5	16.2	4.2	4.2	2	15.9	±3.1 pp	2.5
Nanos Research	January 6, 2023		30.6	26.6	17.5	3.9	4.1	2.4	14.8	±3.1 pp	4
Nanos Research	December 30, 2022		30.5	27.4	16.8	3.5	3.8	2.2	15.9	±3.1 pp	3.1
Nanos Research	December 23, 2022		30	27	17.6	3.8	3.6	1.8	16.0	±3.1 pp	3
Nanos Research	December 16, 2022		29	27	17.3	4.4	3.6	1.8	16.8	±3.1 pp	2
Nanos Research	December 9, 2022		27.9	27.8	16.4	3.3	2.9	2.6	19.2	±3.1 pp	0.1
Nanos Research	December 2, 2022		29.2	25.8	18.2	2.8	2.7	2	19.3	±3.1 pp	3.4
Nanos Research	November 25, 2022		29.4	25.8	18.4	3.6	2.1	2.5	18.3	±3.1 pp	3.6

=== September 2022 – November 2022 ===
Polling firm	Last date of polling	Link	Justin Trudeau	Pierre Poilievre	Jagmeet Singh	Yves-François Blanchet	Amita Kuttner	Maxime Bernier	Unsure	Margin of error	Lead
Nanos Research	November 18, 2022		30.5	26.1	18.4	3.6	1.5	2.0	18.0	±3.1 pp	4.4
Nanos Research	November 11, 2022		31.0	27.3	18.0	4.1	1.6	1.4	16.6	±3.1 pp	3.7
Nanos Research	November 4, 2022		31.5	28.0	16.5	4.6	1.5	2.1	15.7	±3.1 pp	3.5
Nanos Research	October 28, 2022		30.7	28.9	15.1	4.8	1.6	3.0	15.9	±3.1 pp	1.8
Research Co.	October 26, 2022		30	24	17	4	1	2	21	±3.1 pp	4
Nanos Research	October 21, 2022		29.5	30.0	16.2	5.2	1.2	3.0	15.0	±3.1 pp	0.5
Nanos Research	October 14, 2022		29.8	30.0	14.9	3.7	0.7	2.7	18.1	±3.1 pp	0.2
Nanos Research	October 7, 2022		29.0	27.0	19.4	3.2	1.1	2.6	17.7	±3.1 pp	2.0
Nanos Research	September 30, 2022		28.2	24.8	20.8	2.9	1.1	2.6	19.6	±3.1 pp	3.4
Nanos Research	September 23, 2022		29.2	20.9	19.6	2.5	1.6	3.2	22.9	±3.1 pp	8.3
Ipsos	September 20, 2022		31	35	26	8	N/A	N/A	N/A	N/A	4
Leger	September 18, 2022		24	21	17	N/A	1	3	N/A	N/A	3
Nanos Research	September 16, 2022		27.4	18.4	20.9	2.9	1.6	3.1	25.8	±3.0 pp	6.5

=== February 2022 – September 2022 ===
Polling firm	Last date of polling	Link	Justin Trudeau	Candice Bergen	Jagmeet Singh	Yves-François Blanchet	Amita Kuttner	Maxime Bernier	Unsure	Margin of error	Lead
Nanos Research	September 9, 2022		29.6	19.3	17.4	3.3	1.4	3.2	25.8	±3.0 pp	10.3
Nanos Research	September 2, 2022		31.1	18.8	16.9	3.1	1.4	3.3	25.4	±2.9 pp	12.3
Nanos Research	August 26, 2022		31.1	18.1	17.0	3.5	1.6	3.2	25.6	±2.9 pp	13.0
Nanos Research	August 19, 2022		30.1	19.2	17.1	3.6	2.2	3.4	24.4	±2.9 pp	10.9
Nanos Research	August 12, 2022		28.7	17.8	18.1	2.9	2.5	3.5	26.6	±2.9 pp	10.6
Nanos Research	August 5, 2022		26.7	18.2	19.0	3.6	3.0	3.3	26.2	±3.0 pp	7.7
Nanos Research	July 29, 2022		27.8	17.6	18.9	3.6	2.5	2.7	26.9	±3.0 pp	8.9
Nanos Research	July 22, 2022		27.3	16.6	18.8	3.7	2.3	2.7	28.7	±3.0 pp	8.5
Nanos Research	July 15, 2022		28.1	17.7	18.9	4.0	2.3	2.6	26.4	±3.0 pp	9.2
Nanos Research	July 8, 2022		29.9	18.1	17.5	3.2	2.1	2.4	26.5	±3.0 pp	11.8
Nanos Research	July 1, 2022		30.1	19.5	17.2	3.0	1.6	2.7	25.4	±3.0 pp	10.6
Nanos Research	June 24, 2022		31.0	18.5	16.9	2.9	1.7	3.8	25.3	±3.0 pp	12.5
Nanos Research	June 17, 2022		29.8	18.2	16.9	2.9	1.8	4.6	25.8	±3.0 pp	11.6
Nanos Research	June 10, 2022		29.8	19.3	16.0	3.7	2.1	4.8	24.3	±3.1 pp	10.5
Nanos Research	June 3, 2022		28.8	19.9	16.2	4.4	1.6	4.7	24.5	±3.0 pp	8.9
Nanos Research	May 27, 2022		30.7	20.6	16.5	4.5	1.6	3.9	22.2	±3.0 pp	10.1
Nanos Research	May 20, 2022		31.1	20.5	16.6	4.8	1.7	3.5	21.7	±3.0 pp	10.6
Nanos Research	May 13, 2022		31.9	20.3	17.4	4.4	1.5	2.8	21.7	±3.1 pp	11.6
Nanos Research	May 6, 2022		30.8	20.3	18.5	3.7	1.5	2.6	22.6	±3.1 pp	10.5
Nanos Research	April 29, 2022		29.7	21.5	16.8	4.4	1.6	3.2	22.9	±3.1 pp	8.2
Nanos Research	April 22, 2022		29.7	20.4	17.3	4.7	1.1	3.4	23.3	±3.1 pp	9.3
Nanos Research	April 15, 2022		29.7	19.1	17.4	4.9	1.4	4.2	23.2	±3.1 pp	10.6
Nanos Research	April 8, 2022		31.8	18.5	17.1	4.2	1.9	5.2	21.3	±3.1 pp	13.3
Nanos Research	April 1, 2022		30.0	16.9	19.0	4.1	1.8	4.8	23.3	±3.1 pp	11.0
Nanos Research	March 25, 2022		30.4	17.1	19.5	3.3	1.9	4.5	23.2	±3.1 pp	10.9
Nanos Research	March 18, 2022		30.0	18.5	19.3	3.1	1.2	4.7	23.2	±3.1 pp	10.7
Nanos Research	March 11, 2022		31.0	17.2	19.1	3.5	1.1	5.6	22.4	±3.1 pp	11.9
Nanos Research	March 4, 2022		30.6	18.0	17.5	3.2	1.1	6.1	23.4	±3.1 pp	12.6
Nanos Research	February 25, 2022		29.9	19.2	17.1	3.3	1.2	7.3	22.0	±3.1 pp	10.7
Nanos Research	February 18, 2022		28.6	19.2	16.7	3.4	1.5	8.0	22.5	±3.1 pp	9.4

== Seat projections ==
Ahead of the election, YouGov published a Multilevel Regression with Poststratification (MRP) model for the election. This large-scale poll and methodology enables the projection of seat totals. Below is their central prediction for seat totals.

Polling firm	Last date	Link	LPC	CPC	BQ	NDP	GPC	Others	Margin of error	Sample size	Polling method	Lead
2025 election	April 28, 2025	HTML	169	144	22	7	1	0	—N/a	19,597,674	—N/a	Liberal minority
YouGov (MRP)	April 25, 2025		185	135	18	3	2	0	—N/a	5,694	—N/a	Liberal majority
YouGov (MRP)	April 22, 2025		182	133	23	4	1	0	—N/a	6,077	—N/a	Liberal majority
2021 election	September 20, 2021	HTML	160	119	32	25	2	0	—N/a	17,034,243	—N/a	Liberal minority

== Government approval polls ==
Polling firm	Last date of polling	Link	Approve	Disapprove	Unsure/ Neither	Margin of error	Sample size	Polling method	Net approval
Abacus Data	March 25, 2025		41%	25%	—N/a	±2.0 pp	2,000	Online	+16%
The 30th Canadian Ministry led by prime minister Carney is sworn in
Abacus Data	January 7, 2025		21%	63%	—N/a	±2.0 pp	2,500	Online	–42%
Leger	December 22, 2024		23%	72%	5%	±2.51 pp	1,521	Online	–49%
Abacus Data	December 17, 2024		22%	62%	—N/a	±2.9 pp	1,186	Online	–40%
Abacus Data	December 4, 2024		24%	61%	—N/a	±1.9 pp	2,720	Online	–37%
Leger	December 3, 2024		26%	69%	5%	±2.5 pp	1,532	Online	–43%
Abacus Data	November 19, 2024		25%	61%	—N/a	±2.3 pp	1,915	Online	–36%
Abacus Data	November 5, 2024		25%	62%	—N/a	±2.3 pp	1,915	Online	–37%
Leger	November 3, 2024		27%	68%	4%	±2.49 pp	1,549	Online	–41%
Abacus Data	October 22, 2024		24%	61%	—N/a	±2.5 pp	1,500	Online	–37%
Abacus Data	October 10, 2024		26%	59%	—N/a	±2.3 pp	1,900	Online	–33%
Leger	September 29, 2024		27%	65%	6%	±2.43 pp	1,626	Online	–38%
Abacus Data	September 25, 2024		25%	59%	—N/a	±2.4 pp	1,700	Online	–34%
Leger	August 25, 2024		28%	64%	7%	±2.48 pp	1,556	Online	–36%
Abacus Data	September 12, 2024		24%	62%	—N/a	±1.8 pp	2,964	Online	–38%
Leger	August 25, 2024		28%	65%	5%	±2.45 pp	1,602	Online	–37%
Abacus Data	August 7, 2024		27%	57%	—N/a	±2.489 pp	1,550	Online	–30%
Leger	July 28, 2024		29%	66%	4%	±2.45 pp	1,601	Online	–37%
Abacus Data	July 9, 2024		26%	60%	—N/a	±2.1 pp	1,989	Online	–34%
Leger	June 30, 2024		27%	63%	9%	±2.51 pp	1,521	Online	–36%
Leger	June 23, 2024		29%	65%	4%	±2.45 pp	1,607	Online	–36%
Leger	May 26, 2024		27%	66%	5%	±2.44 pp	1,620	Online	–39%
Leger	April 28, 2024		25%	69%	4%	±2.44 pp	1,610	Online	–44%
Abacus Data	April 16, 2024		25%	57%	—N/a	±2 pp	2,300	Online	–32%
Abacus Data	April 9, 2024		26%	60%	—N/a	±2.1 pp	2,000	Online	–34%
Leger	March 25, 2024		28%	66%	4%	±2.45 pp	1,605	Online	–38%
Abacus Data	March 21, 2024		26%	59%	—N/a	±1.7 pp	3,550	Online	–33%
Abacus Data	March 6, 2024		26%	58%	—N/a	±2.5 pp	1,500	Online	–32%
Leger	February 25, 2024		29%	66%	4%	±2.49 pp	1,590	Online	–37%
Abacus Data	February 21, 2024		24%	59%	18%	±2.0 pp	2,125	Online	–35%
Abacus Data	February 7, 2024		24%	59%	17%	±2.0 pp	2,398	Online	–35%
Leger	January 28, 2024		30%	63%	5%	±2.47 pp	1,579	Online	–33%
Abacus Data	January 23, 2024		28%	58%	14%	±2.1 pp	2,199	Online	–30%
Abacus Data	January 9, 2024		26%	58%	16%	±2.6 pp	1,500	Online	–32%
Leger	December 17, 2023		33%	61%	5%	±2.43 pp	1,622	Online	–28%
Abacus Data	December 12, 2023		28%	56%	16%	±2.3 pp	1,919	Online	–28%
Abacus Data	November 28, 2023		27%	57%	16%	±2.0 pp	2,417	Online	–30%
Leger	November 26, 2023		29%	64%	6%	±2.51 pp	1,529	Online	–35%
Leger	November 12, 2023		30%	63%	7%	±2.44 pp	1,612	Online	–33%
Abacus Data	November 12, 2023		26%	58%	16%	±2.3 pp	2,000	Online	–32%
Leger	October 29, 2023		30%	63%	5%	±2.4 pp	1,632	Online	–33%
Leger	September 27, 2023		33%	60%	5%	±2.4 pp	1,652	Online	–27%
Abacus Data	September 12, 2023		29%	57%	14%	±2.1 pp	2,125	Online	–28%
Abacus Data	September 4, 2023		31%	53%	16%	±1.7 pp	3,595	Online	–22%
Abacus Data	August 7, 2023		31%	54%	15%	±2.0 pp	1,650	Online	–23%
Abacus Data	July 25, 2023		32%	51%	17%	±2.0 pp	2,486	Online	–19%
Abacus Data	May 3, 2023		34%	49%	17%	±2.4 pp	1,750	Online	–15%
Abacus Data	March 21, 2023		33%	49%	18%	±2.3 pp	1,963	Online	–16%
Abacus Data	March 4, 2023		35%	49%	16%	±2.0 pp	2,600	Online	–14%
Abacus Data	February 18, 2023		34%	48%	18%	±1.6 pp	4,000	Online	–14%
Abacus Data	January 30, 2023		34%	49%	17%	±2.6 pp	1,500	Online	–15%
Abacus Data	January 16, 2023		34%	47%	19%	±2.2 pp	2,099	Online	–13%
Abacus Data	October 26, 2022		35%	47%	18%	±2.1 pp	1,500	Online	–12%
Ipsos	September 21, 2022		42%	58%	—N/a	±3.5 pp	1,000	Online	–16%
Abacus Data	September 14, 2022		37%	49%	14%	±2.2 pp	1,990	Online	–12%
Abacus Data	August 30, 2022		36%	49%	15%	±2.6 pp	1,500	Online	–13%
Abacus Data	July 27, 2022		34%	51%	15%	±2.0 pp	2,400	Online	–17%
Abacus Data	July 17, 2022		38%	46%	16%	±2.6 pp	1,500	Online	–8%
Abacus Data	June 23, 2022		38%	45%	17%	±1.8 pp	3,026	Online	–7%
Abacus Data	May 24, 2022		40%	43%	17%	±2.6 pp	1,500	Online	–3%
Abacus Data	May 6, 2022		41%	42%	17%	±2.6 pp	1,500	Online	–1%
Abacus Data	April 9, 2022		41%	44%	15%	±2.1 pp	2,000	Online	–3%
Abacus Data	March 25, 2022		40%	42%	18%	±2.6 pp	1,500	Online	–2%
Abacus Data	February 22, 2022		39%	46%	15%	±1.4 pp	5,200	Online	–7%
Abacus Data	February 8, 2022		38%	45%	16%	±2.6 pp	1,500	Online	–7%
Ipsos	January 17, 2022		49%	51%	—N/a	±3.5 pp	1,001	Online	–2%
Abacus Data	January 12, 2022		44%	40%	16%	±2.1 pp	2,200	Online	+4%
Abacus Data	November 30, 2021		41%	44%	15%	±2.2 pp	2,025	Online	–3%
Ipsos	November 15, 2021		48%	52%	—N/a	±3.5 pp	1,001	Online	–4%
Abacus Data	October 20, 2021		42%	43%	16%	±1.9 pp	2,200	Online	–1%

== See also ==
- Opinion polling for the 2025 Canadian federal election by constituency
