= Opinion polling for the 2015 Canadian federal election =

This table provides a list of scientific, nationwide public opinion polls that were conducted from the 2011 Canadian federal election leading up to the 2015 Canadian federal election, which was held on October 19, 2015. For riding-specific polls see 2015 constituency polls.

== Campaign period ==
Graphical summary

Evolution of voting intentions according to polls conducted during campaign period of the 2015 Canadian federal election, graphed from the data in the table below. Trendlines are local regressions, with polls weighted by proximity in time and a logarithmic function of sample size. 95% confidence ribbons represent uncertainty about the trendlines, not the likelihood that actual election results would fall within the intervals.

Polling firm	Last date of polling^{[1]}	Link	CPC	NDP	LPC	BQ	GPC	Margin of error^{[2]}	Sample size^{[3]}	Polling method^{[4]}	Lead
2015 election	October 19, 2015		31.9	19.7	39.5	4.7	3.4	N/A	17,559,353	N/A	7.6
Nanos Research	October 18, 2015		30.5	19.7	39.1	5.5	4.6	±3.5 pp	800	telephone	8.6
Forum Research	October 18, 2015		30	20	40	6	3	±3 pp	1,373	IVR	10
EKOS	October 18, 2015		31.9	20.4	35.8	4.9	5.6	±2.1 pp	2,122	IVR/telephone – rolling (1/3)	3.9
EKOS	October 17, 2015		32.6	21.0	34.3	5.4	5.4	±2.4 pp	1,621	IVR/telephone – rolling (1/2)	1.7
Ipsos Reid	October 17, 2015		31	22	38	4	4	±2.2 pp	2,503	online/telephone	7
Nanos Research	October 17, 2015		30.5	22.1	37.3	4.6	4.7	±2.2 pp	2,000	telephone – rolling (2/5)	6.8
EKOS	October 16, 2015		33.3	21.9	33.7	4.7	4.1	±2.5 pp	1,537	IVR/telephone – rolling (1/2)	0.4
Nanos Research	October 16, 2015		30.7	22.6	37.0	4.4	4.7	±2.5 pp	1,600	telephone – rolling (1/2)	6.3
Léger Marketing	October 16, 2015		30	22	38	6	4	±2.1 pp	2,086	online	8
Angus Reid	October 16, 2015		31	22	35	5	5	±2.2 pp	2,022	online	4
Mainstreet Research	October 15, 2015		33	21	38	4	5	±1.4 pp	5,546	IVR	5
EKOS	October 15, 2015		32.8	22.7	34.0	3.4	5.1	±2.3 pp	1,813	IVR/telephone – rolling (1/3)	1.2
Nanos Research	October 15, 2015		30.6	23.5	36.5	4.3	4.7	±2.8 pp	1,200	telephone – rolling (1/3)	5.9
Forum Research	October 14, 2015		31	24	37	6	2	±3 pp	1,438	IVR	6
EKOS	October 14, 2015		32.6	22.9	33.5	3.4	5.6	±2.6 pp	1,438	IVR/telephone – rolling (1/3)	0.9
Nanos Research	October 14, 2015		29.4	23.7	37.1	5.0	4.3	±2.8 pp	1,200	telephone – rolling (1/3)	7.7
EKOS	October 13, 2015		29.9	24.1	34.1	3.8	6.4	±2.9 pp	1,179	IVR/telephone – rolling (1/3)	4.2
Nanos Research	October 13, 2015		29.2	24.5	36.1	5.2	4.3	±2.8 pp	1,200	telephone – rolling (1/3)	6.9
Ipsos Reid	October 13, 2015		31	24	37	5	2	±3.0 pp	1,349	online	6
EKOS	October 12, 2015		31.1	20.6	35.6	3.2	7.5	±2.9 pp	1,115	IVR/telephone – rolling (2/3)	4.5
Nanos Research	October 11, 2015		28.9	24.3	35.7	5.7	4.8	±2.8 pp	1,200	telephone – rolling (1/3)	6.8
Innovative Research	October 11, 2015		30	22	38	3	6	±3.1 pp	1,143	telephone	8
EKOS	October 10, 2015		35.5	19.0	33.1	3.3	7.4	±2.6 pp	1,428	IVR/telephone – rolling (2/3)	2.4
Nanos Research	October 10, 2015		29.0	25.0	35.1	5.2	5.1	±2.8 pp	1,200	telephone – rolling (1/3)	6.1
Forum Research	October 9, 2015		31	23	37	5	3	±3 pp	1,427	IVR	6
Nanos Research	October 9, 2015		28.6	24.9	34.8	5.5	5.4	±2.8 pp	1,200	telephone – rolling (1/3)	6.2
Angus Reid	October 9, 2015		33	25	31	6	3	±3 pp	1,083	online	2
EKOS	October 8, 2015		33.7	20.4	33.8	3.5	7.2	±2.4 pp	1,618	IVR/telephone – rolling (1/3)	0.1
Nanos Research	October 8, 2015		31.0	25.0	34.0	5.3	4.2	±2.8 pp	1,200	telephone – rolling (1/3)	3.0
Innovative Research	October 8, 2015		30	24	35	5	5	n.a	3,417	online	5
Mainstreet Research	October 7, 2015		36	20	35	4	5	±1.3 pp	5,630	IVR	1
Léger Marketing	October 7, 2015		30	25	34	6	4	±2.1 pp	2,087	online	4
EKOS	October 7, 2015		32.5	21.1	34.1	3.6	7.3	±2.3 pp	1,753	IVR/telephone – rolling (1/3)	1.6
Nanos Research	October 7, 2015		31.6	24.2	33.5	5.6	4.6	±2.8 pp	1,200	telephone – rolling (1/3)	1.9
Forum Research	October 6, 2015		31	26	35	4	3	±3 pp	1,447	IVR	4
Abacus Data	October 6, 2015		33	24	32	4	5	±2.2 pp	2,000	online	1
EKOS	October 6, 2015		34.1	21.4	32.3	4.0	6.9	±2.3 pp	1,788	IVR/telephone – rolling (1/3)	1.8
Nanos Research	October 6, 2015		32.1	23.0	34.3	5.1	4.6	±2.8 pp	1,200	telephone – rolling (1/3)	2.2
EKOS	October 5, 2015		35.1	22.2	30.9	4.0	6.6	±2.4 pp	1,658	IVR/telephone – rolling	4.2
Nanos Research	October 5, 2015		31.5	23.1	35.0	4.9	4.6	±2.8 pp	1,200	telephone – rolling (1/3)	3.5
Ipsos Reid	October 5, 2015		33	26	32	5	3	±2.9 pp	1,441	online	1
Nanos Research	October 4, 2015		31.0	22.8	35.6	4.8	4.7	±2.8 pp	1,200	telephone – rolling (1/3)	4.6
Nanos Research	October 3, 2015		31.0	24.3	35.3	4.3	4.5	±2.8 pp	1,200	telephone – rolling (1/3)	4.3
Nanos Research	October 2, 2015		30.5	25.1	34.6	4.5	4.8	±2.8 pp	1,200	telephone – rolling (1/3)	4.1
Mainstreet Research	October 1, 2015		37	24	29	4	7	±1.4 pp	5,197	IVR	8
Innovative Research	October 1, 2015		29	29	31	5	6	n.a	1,562	online	2
Nanos Research	October 1, 2015		31.9	25.9	33.5	4.3	3.9	±2.8 pp	1,200	telephone – rolling (1/3)	1.6
Léger Marketing	September 30, 2015		30	26	32	6	6	±2.1 pp	2,107	online	2
Angus Reid	September 30, 2015		34	27	27	6	5	±2.5 pp	2,021	online	7
Nanos Research	September 30, 2015		32.8	26.1	31.7	4.8	4.1	±2.8 pp	1,200	telephone – rolling (1/3)	1.1
Forum Research	September 29, 2015		34	28	27	5	5	±3 pp	1,499	IVR	6
Nanos Research	September 29, 2015		32.1	26.3	32.2	4.6	4.4	±2.8 pp	1,200	telephone – rolling (1/3)	0.1
EKOS	September 29, 2015		33.4	25.6	26.7	5.3	7.8	±1.9 pp	2,609	IVR	6.7
Nanos Research	September 28, 2015		32.6	27.0	31.4	4.4	4.0	±2.8 pp	1,200	telephone – rolling (1/3)	1.2
Ipsos Reid	September 28, 2015		32	27	33	4	4	±3.0 pp	1,354	online	1
Nanos Research	September 27, 2015		33.0	26.9	31.6	4.2	3.6	±2.8 pp	1,200	telephone – rolling (1/3)	1.4
Abacus Data	September 27, 2015		32	27	29	5	5	±1.6 pp	3,814	online	3
Nanos Research	September 26, 2015		31.5	27.6	32.5	4.0	3.7	±2.8 pp	1,200	telephone – rolling (1/3)	1.0
Nanos Research	September 25, 2015		29.6	30.3	31.8	3.1	4.5	±2.8 pp	1,200	telephone – rolling (1/3)	1.5
Nanos Research	September 24, 2015		28.9	31.1	32.3	2.5	4.2	±2.8 pp	1,200	telephone – rolling (1/3)	1.2
Innovative Research	September 24, 2015		31	29	28	3	8	n.a.	2,805	online	2
Forum Research	September 23, 2015		31	28	31	4	4	±3 pp	1,557	IVR	Tie
Nanos Research	September 23, 2015		30.5	30.8	31.5	2.3	3.7	±2.8 pp	1,200	telephone – rolling (1/3)	0.7
Léger Marketing	September 23, 2015		31	29	31	5	5	±2.1 pp	2,115	online	Tie
Innovative Research	September 23, 2015		32	27	30	3	7	±2.5 pp	1,784	telephone	2
Nanos Research	September 22, 2015		31.5	29.1	31.6	2.6	4.2	±2.8 pp	1,200	telephone – rolling (1/3)	0.1
EKOS	September 22, 2015		35.4	24.5	26.3	4.2	7.7	±2.0 pp	2,343	IVR	9.1
Nanos Research	September 21, 2015		31.3	29.4	30.3	3.4	4.6	±2.8 pp	1,200	telephone – rolling (1/3)	1.0
Ipsos Reid	September 21, 2015		27	30	33	5	4	±3.4 pp	1,103	online	3
Nanos Research	September 20, 2015		31.0	29.1	29.4	3.8	5.5	±2.8 pp	1,200	telephone – rolling (1/3)	1.6
Nanos Research	September 19, 2015		30.8	29.1	30.3	3.7	5.1	±2.8 pp	1,200	telephone – rolling (1/3)	0.5
Forum Research	September 18, 2015		33	29	29	4	4	±3 pp	922	IVR	4
Nanos Research	September 18, 2015		30.4	28.9	30.8	3.0	6.0	±2.8 pp	1,200	telephone – rolling (1/3)	0.4
Nanos Research	September 17, 2015		29.1	31.3	31.0	2.3	5.8	±2.8 pp	1,200	telephone – rolling (1/3)	0.3
Nanos Research	September 16, 2015		30.1	30.4	30.9	2.5	5.8	±2.8 pp	1,200	telephone – rolling (1/3)	0.5
Forum Research	September 15, 2015		32	30	28	4	6	±3 pp	1,402	IVR	2
Nanos Research	September 15, 2015		29.0	31.6	30.1	2.8	5.3	±2.8 pp	1,200	telephone – rolling (1/3)	1.5
Environics	September 15, 2015		26	34	29	4	8	±3.6 pp	1,001	telephone	5
EKOS	September 15, 2015		29.6	29.9	27.4	3.7	7.6	±1.9 pp	2,704	IVR	0.3
Nanos Research	September 14, 2015		31.0	30.4	29.6	2.9	4.8	±2.8 pp	1,200	telephone – rolling (1/3)	0.6
Ipsos Reid	September 13, 2015		29	32	31	4	4	±3.6 pp	980	online	1
Nanos Research	September 13, 2015		30.2	31.3	30.3	2.6	4.3	±2.8 pp	1,200	telephone – rolling (1/3)	1.0
Nanos Research	September 12, 2015		31.7	30.8	30.5	2.5	4.1	±2.8 pp	1,200	telephone – rolling (1/3)	0.9
Abacus Data	September 11, 2015		29	31	29	4	6	±2.6 pp	1,500	online	2
Nanos Research	September 11, 2015		30.9	30.1	31.7	2.8	4.0	±2.8 pp	1,200	telephone – rolling (1/3)	0.8
Forum Research	September 10, 2015		28	36	29	3	3	±3 pp	1,308	IVR	7
Nanos Research	September 10, 2015		30.8	29.9	30.9	3.2	4.6	±2.8 pp	1,200	telephone – rolling (1/3)	0.1
Innovative Research	September 10, 2015		28	31	30	4	6	±2.2 pp	2,121	online	1
Nanos Research	September 9, 2015		28.6	30.6	32.1	3.6	4.8	±2.8 pp	1,200	telephone – rolling (1/3)	1.5
Nanos Research	September 8, 2015		25.9	31.2	32.5	3.7	6.1	±2.8 pp	1,200	telephone – rolling (1/3)	1.3
Ipsos Reid	September 8, 2015		29	34	30	3	3	±3.6 pp	949	online	4
EKOS	September 8, 2015		31.8	29.6	26.9	4.6	5.9	±1.9 pp	2,677	IVR	2.2
Nanos Research	September 6, 2015		26.2	32.7	30.8	3.7	6.0	±2.8 pp	1,200	telephone – rolling	1.9
Léger Marketing	September 2, 2015		28	31	30	4	5	±2.1 pp	2,119	online	1
Forum Research	September 1, 2015		24	36	32	4	4	±3 pp	1,384	IVR	4
EKOS	September 1, 2015		29.5	30.2	27.7	4.2	6.4	±1.7 pp	3,243	IVR	0.7
Abacus Data	August 28, 2015		30	31	28	3	7	±2.6 pp	1,500	online	1
Nanos Research	August 28, 2015		28.8	30.8	29.7	4.2	5.4	±3.1 pp	1,000	telephone – rolling (1/4)	1.1
Innovative Research	August 26, 2015		30	32	27	4	6	±1.7 pp	3,274	online	2
Ipsos Reid	August 26, 2015		29	33	30	4	4	±3.5 pp	1,000	online	3
EKOS	August 25, 2015		28.1	33.6	26.7	4.1	5.8	±1.7 pp	3,524	IVR	5.5
Forum Research	August 24, 2015		23	40	30	3	3	±3 pp	1,440	IVR	10
Angus Reid^{[LV]}	August 24, 2015		32	36	23	4	4	±1.2 pp	6,226	online	4
Nanos Research	August 21, 2015		30.1	29.1	29.9	4.7	5.2	±3.1 pp	1,000	telephone – rolling (1/4)	0.2
Forum Research	August 19, 2015		29	34	28	4	4	±3 pp	1,473	IVR	5
Abacus Data	August 17, 2015		29	35	26	3	6	±2.6 pp	1,439	online	6
Nanos Research	August 14, 2015		31.8	29.0	28.7	4.5	5.3	±3.1 pp	1,000	telephone – rolling (1/4)	2.8
Léger Marketing	August 12, 2015		27	33	28	5	6	±2.1 pp	2,095	online	5
Mainstreet Research	August 11, 2015		31	30	29	4	6	±1.35 pp	5,401	IVR	1
Forum Research	August 11, 2015		28	34	27	6	4	±3 pp	1,392	IVR	6
EKOS	August 11, 2015		30.4	31.8	24.2	4.2	7.3	±1.8 pp	3,055	IVR	1.4
Ipsos Reid	August 10, 2015		30.8	33.0	27.8	3.9	4.0	±2.38 pp	2,022	telephone/online	2.2
Nanos Research	August 7, 2015		31.2	30.4	28.6	4.2	5.0	±3.1 pp	1,000	telephone – rolling (1/4)	0.8
Forum Research	August 2, 2015		28	39	25	5	3	±3 pp	1,399	IVR	11

Notes

^{1} In cases when linked poll details distinguish between the margin of error associated with the total sample of respondents (including undecided and non-voters) and that of the subsample of decided/leaning voters, the latter is included in the table. Also not included is the margin of error created by rounding to the nearest whole number or any margin of error from methodological sources. Most online polls—because of their opt-in method of recruiting panellists which results in a non-random sample—cannot have a margin of error. In such cases, shown is what the margin of error would be for a survey using a random probability-based sample of equivalent size.
^{2} Refers to the total sample size, including undecided and non-voters.
^{3} "Telephone" refers to traditional telephone polls conducted by live interviewers; "IVR" refers to automated Interactive Voice Response polls conducted by telephone; "online" refers to polls conducted exclusively over the internet; "telephone/online" refers to polls which combine results from both telephone and online surveys, or for which respondents are initially recruited by telephone and then asked to complete an online survey. "Rolling" polls contain overlapping data from one poll to the next, with the fraction in parentheses indicating the proportion of independent data compared to the previous published poll in the series.
^{LV} Identifies polling firms that explicitly apply a "likely voter" turnout adjustment to their top-line results.

== Pre-campaign period ==
Graphical summary

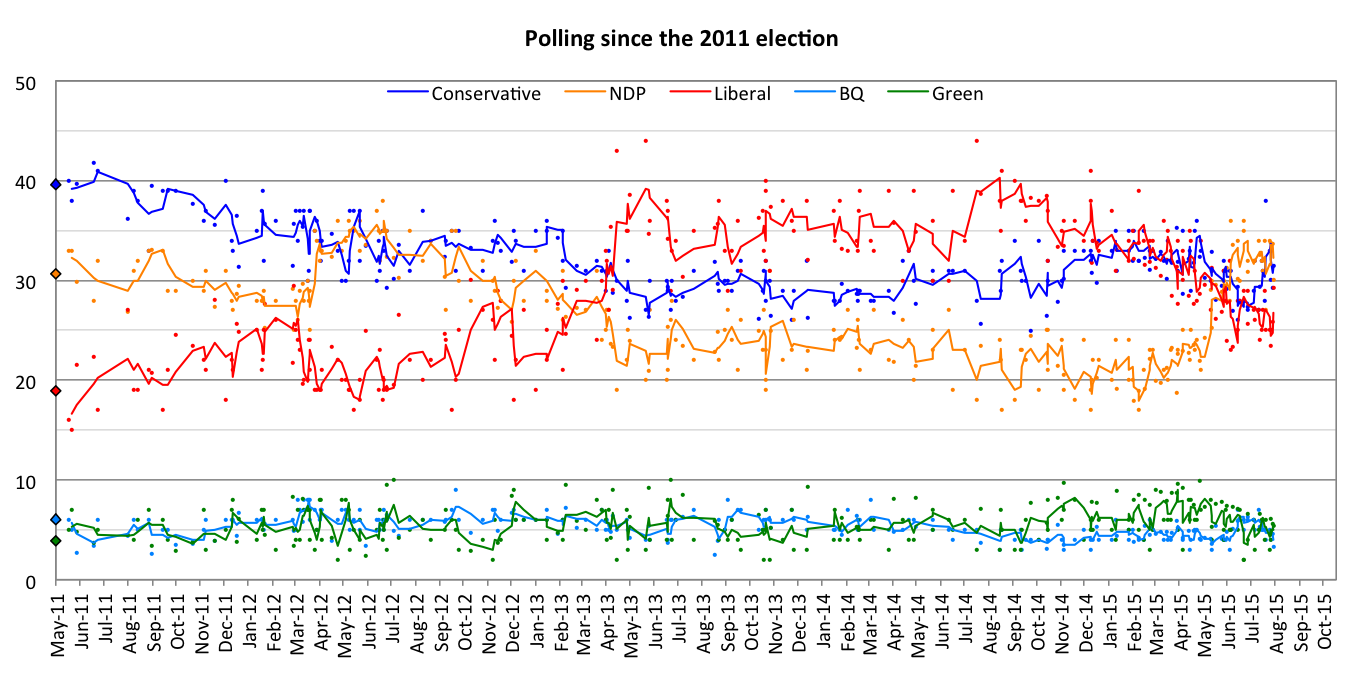
Evolution of voting intentions according to polls conducted during the pre-campaign period of the 2015 Canadian federal election, graphed from the data in the table below. Trendlines are local regressions, with polls weighted by proximity in time and a logarithmic function of sample size. 95% confidence ribbons represent uncertainty about the trendlines, not the likelihood that actual election results would fall within the intervals.

Polling firm	Last date of polling^{[1]}	Link	CPC	NDP	LPC	BQ	GPC	Margin of error^{[2]}	Sample size^{[3]}	Polling method^{[4]}	Lead
Nanos Research	July 31, 2015		31.5	30.1	29.3	3.3	5.4	±3.1 pp	1,000	telephone – rolling (1/2)	1.4
Innovative Research	July 30, 2015		29.3	33.7	25.8	4.6	5.6	±1.9 pp	2,833	online	4.4
Forum Research	July 28, 2015		33	33	25	4	4	±3.0 pp	1,397	IVR	Tie
EKOS	July 28, 2015		30.1	33.8	23.4	4.7	6.1	±2.1 pp	2,247	IVR	3.7
Ipsos Reid	July 27, 2015		33	34	25	5	3	±2.5 pp	1,571	online	1
Mainstreet Research	July 21, 2015		38	27	25	4	6	±1.37 pp	5,147	IVR	11
Forum Research	July 20, 2015		28	34	29	5	4	±3.0 pp	1,208	IVR	6
Nanos Research	July 17, 2015		31	31	27	5	6	±3.1 pp	1,000	telephone – rolling	Tie
Leger Marketing	July 16, 2015		32	32	25	5	6	±2.5 pp	1,545	online	Tie
EKOS	July 14, 2015		29.4	32.6	24.0	5.3	6.6	±2.0 pp	2,538	IVR	3.2
Forum Research	July 13, 2015		27	34	27	7	5	±3.0 pp	1,251	IVR	7
Forum Research	July 7, 2015		32	32	26	5	3	±3.0 pp	1,200	IVR	Tie
Abacus Data	July 6, 2015		29	32	27	6	6	±2.2 pp	2,000	online	3
Forum Research	June 29, 2015		27	32	29	6	4	±3.0 pp	1,221	IVR	3
EKOS	June 28, 2015		27.3	30.9	25.6	6.3	6.6	±2.3 pp	1,752	IVR	3.6
Forum Research	June 23, 2015		28	36	28	5	2	±3.0 pp	1,268	IVR	8
Ipsos Reid	June 23, 2015		28	35	29	6	2	±2.5 pp	2,003	online	6
Environics	June 18, 2015		28	30	28	6	7	±2.4 pp	2,003	telephone	2
Forum Research	June 16, 2015		26	34	28	7	5	±3.0 pp	1,281	IVR	6
EKOS	June 16, 2015		29.4	30.2	25.0	5.9	7.1	±1.6 pp	3,834	IVR	0.8
	June 9, 2015	Bloc Québécois leader Beaulieu steps down and is replaced by former leader Gilles Duceppe									
EKOS	June 9, 2015		26.9	33.6	23.3	5.1	7.3	±2.0 pp	2,491	IVR	6.7
Angus Reid	June 7, 2015		31	36	23	5	5	±1.2 pp	6,005	online	5
Forum Research	June 5, 2015		31	28	32	3	5	±3.0 pp	1,156	IVR	1
EKOS	June 2, 2015		29.2	31.3	23.9	4.8	7.4	±2.1 pp	2,204	IVR	2.1
Abacus Data	May 31, 2015		31	28	28	4	7	±2.6 pp	1,500	online	3
Ipsos Reid	May 29, 2015		31	30	31	4	4	±3.5 pp	1,003	online	Tie
Nanos Research	May 29, 2015		32	30	29	4	5	±3.1 pp	1,000	telephone – rolling (1/2)	2
EKOS	May 26, 2015		29.5	28.9	26.8	4.1	7.8	±1.8 pp	2,934	IVR	0.6
EKOS	May 19, 2015		28.1	29.6	26.1	5.4	7.6	±1.9 pp	2,675	IVR	1.5
Nanos Research	May 14, 2015		32.9	25.2	31.3	3.6	5.3	±3.1 pp	1,000	telephone – rolling	1.6
Forum Research	May 13, 2015		31	30	31	3	4	±3.0 pp	1,286	IVR	Tie
EKOS	May 12, 2015		30.0	29.1	27.0	4.1	8.0	±2.1 pp	2,177	IVR	0.9
EKOS	May 5, 2015		30.3	24.2	29.6	4.2	7.3	±1.8 pp	3,017	IVR	0.7
Leger Marketing	April 30, 2015		33	21	34	4	7	±2.5 pp	1,488	online	1
EKOS	April 28, 2015		32.4	21.9	28.7	4.1	9.9	±1.6 pp	3,757	IVR	3.7
Abacus Data	April 24, 2015		36	24	28	5	6	±2.6 pp	1,500	online	8
Forum Research	April 22, 2015		35	23	31	5	6	±3.0 pp	977	IVR	4
EKOS	April 21, 2015		31.8	23.5	27.6	4.9	7.5	±1.6 pp	3,850	IVR	4.0
Nanos Research	April 17, 2015		29	25	34	4	8	±3.1 pp	1,000	telephone – rolling	5
Forum Research	April 16, 2015		33	22	35	3	6	±3.0 pp	1,365	IVR	2
EKOS	April 14, 2015		32.2	22.7	28.5	4.9	8.0	±1.7 pp	3,399	IVR	3.7
Ipsos Reid	April 7, 2015		35	25	33	4	3	±3.5 pp	1,001	online	2
EKOS	April 7, 2015		28.7	22.9	30.1	4.2	9.2	±1.7 pp	3,306	IVR	1.4
Forum Research	March 31, 2015		31	23	34	5	5	±3.0 pp	1,239	IVR	3
EKOS	March 31, 2015		31.9	22.6	27.6	5.2	9.6	±1.6 pp	3,901	IVR	4.3
Oraclepoll Research	March 30, 2015		35.3	18.7	31.4	5.9	8.7	±1.8 pp	3,040	telephone	3.9
EKOS	March 24, 2015		31.8	23.2	28.5	4.7	8.7	±1.5 pp	4,311	IVR	3.3
Abacus Data	March 22, 2015		32	23	33	4	6	±3.1 pp	1,000	online	1
Leger Marketing	March 18, 2015		34	20	35	4	6	±2.5 pp	1,511	online	1
EKOS	March 17, 2015		30.2	21.2	32.1	4.8	7.9	±1.6 pp	3,832	IVR	1.9
Forum Research	March 14, 2015		32	21	36	4	6	±3.0 pp	1,370	IVR	4
EKOS	March 10, 2015		32.9	19.7	30.5	4.8	8.8	±1.8 pp	2,950	IVR	2.4
EKOS	March 3, 2015		32.2	19.9	31.3	4.6	9.0	±1.7 pp	3,241	IVR	0.9
Nanos Research	February 27, 2015		33	23	34	5	5	±3.1 pp	1,000	telephone – rolling	1
EKOS	February 24, 2015		31.1	22.1	31.9	4.5	7.5	±1.6 pp	3,607	IVR	0.8
Ipsos Reid	February 23, 2015		33	23	34	6	3	±2.2 pp	2,650	online	1
EKOS	February 17, 2015		32.3	19.1	31.6	5.4	8.0	±1.7 pp	3,386	IVR	0.7
Abacus Data	February 16, 2015		35	21	34	4	4	±2.6 pp	1,460	online	1
Forum Research	February 10, 2015		32	17	39	4	5	±3.0 pp	1,018	IVR	7
EKOS	February 10, 2015		32.0	18.9	33.8	4.2	8.5	±1.8 pp	3,005	IVR	1.8
EKOS	February 3, 2015		35.0	17.9	32.2	3.8	8.0	±1.8 pp	2,974	IVR	2.8
Leger Marketing	February 2, 2015		32	20	35	5	6	±2.5 pp	1,507	online	3
Forum Research	January 28, 2015		35	20	34	5	6	±3.0 pp	1,382	IVR	1
Abacus Data	January 28, 2015		33	24	32	4	5	±3.1 pp	1,005	online	1
EKOS	January 13, 2015		31.0	19.1	33.1	4.4	8.9	±1.5 pp	4,412	IVR	2.1
Ipsos Reid	January 11, 2015		35	24	31	6	4	±2.6 pp	1,915	online	4
Forum Research	January 6, 2015		33	20	37	4	5	±2.0 pp	1,741	IVR	4
Abacus Data	December 20, 2014		34	22	33	4	6	±2.6 pp	1,438	online	1
EKOS	December 18, 2014		29.8	20.2	33.8	5.3	7.7	±1.7 pp	2,183	IVR	3.0
Angus Reid	December 13, 2014		34	22	34	4	5	±1.2 pp	6,325	online	Tie
EKOS	December 12, 2014		30.8	20.0	31.8	5.0	7.8	±1.7 pp	3,276	IVR	1
Forum Research	December 11, 2014		33	17	41	3	5	±2.0 pp	1,658	IVR	8
Leger Marketing	December 11, 2014		32	19	38	4	6	±2.5 pp	1,521	online	6
Ipsos Reid	December 1, 2014		33	24	34	5	4	±1.2 pp	8,268	online	1
Forum Research	November 20, 2014		33	18	36	4	8	±3.0 pp	1,500	IVR	3
EKOS	November 6, 2014		30.2	20.5	33.5	3.5	9.7	±2.5 pp	1,561	IVR	3.3
Leger Marketing	November 6, 2014		33	19	36	3	7	±2.5 pp	1,493	online	3
Abacus Data	November 4, 2014		30	24	35	4	6	±2.3 pp	1,850	online	5
EKOS	October 29, 2014		27.8	21.4	33.4	5.5	8.2	±2.4 pp	1,628	IVR	5.6
Abacus Data	October 17, 2014		30	25	32	4	8	±2.8 pp	1,248	online	2
Leger Marketing	October 16, 2014		32	21	37	4	5	±2.5 pp	1,524	online	5
EKOS	October 15, 2014		26.4	25.0	38.5	3.1	5.7	±2.4 pp	1,671	telephone/online	12.1
Forum Research	October 5, 2014		34	19	38	4	4	±2.5 pp	1,504	IVR	4
EKOS	September 25, 2014		24.9	24.4	38.3	4.0	7.7	±2.5 pp	1,549	telephone/online	13.4
Angus Reid	September 19, 2014		30	22	36	4	6	±2.5 pp	1,502	online	6
Abacus Data	September 14, 2014		30	23	38	3	5	±3.1 pp	1,075	online	8
Ipsos Reid	September 12, 2014		31	23	38	5	3	±2.8 pp	1,605	online	7
Forum Research	September 5, 2014		34	18	40	4	3	±3.0 pp	1,267	IVR	6
Forum Research	August 19, 2014		32	17	41	5	5	±2.0 pp	1,798	IVR	9
Abacus Data	August 18, 2014		29	22	35	5	7	±2.5 pp	1,614	online	6
Ipsos Reid	August 17, 2014		31	24	38	3	3	±3.5 pp	1,012	online	7
EKOS	July 23, 2014		25.6	23.4	38.7	3.7	7.1	±1.9 pp	2,620	telephone/online	12.1
Forum Research	July 18, 2014		28	18	44	5	3	±2.0 pp	1,624	IVR	16
Abacus Data	July 3, 2014		31	23	34	5	6	±2.2 pp	2,000	online	3
Forum Research	June 17, 2014		31	19	39	4	5	±2.0 pp	1,683	IVR	8
	June 14, 2014	Mario Beaulieu is elected leader of the Bloc Québécois.									
Angus Reid	June 12, 2014		31	27	30	5	6	±1.2 pp	6,264	online	1
Angus Reid	May 23, 2014		31	25	30	5	7	±3.4 pp	1,503	online	1
Forum Research	May 23, 2014		30	23	36	6	5	±2.0 pp	1,694	IVR	6
EKOS	May 1, 2014		27.6	21.4	34.9	5.3	8.2	±1.6 pp	3,677	IVR	7.3
Forum Research	April 29, 2014		30	20	39	6	4	±2.0 pp	1,572	IVR	9
Ipsos Reid	April 22, 2014		33	24	33	6	4	±3.5 pp	1,014	online	Tie
Angus Reid	April 15, 2014		32	26	30	5	6	±3.4 pp	1,505	online	2
EKOS	April 3, 2014		26.7	21.8	35.8	4.8	8.1	±1.5 pp	4,134	IVR	9.1
Forum Research	March 28, 2014		29	22	39	5	3	±2.0 pp	1,764	IVR	10
Angus Reid	March 9, 2014		28	27	33	5	6	±1.2 pp	6,445	online	5
Abacus Data	March 5, 2014		28	23	34	8	6	±2.8 pp	1,249	online	6
Forum Research	February 19, 2014		29	21	39	6	4	±2.0 pp	1,824	IVR	10
Ipsos Reid	February 18, 2014		29	24	37	5	5	±3.5 pp	1,034	online	8
Angus Reid	February 16, 2014		28	26	33	5	6	±2.5 pp	1,514	online	5
Nanos Research	February 15, 2014		28.7	23.2	34.0	6.4	5.3	±3.4 pp	1,000	telephone	5.3
Ipsos Reid	February 4, 2014		29	27	33	7	4	±3.5 pp	1,001	online	4
EKOS	January 27, 2014		29.7	24.3	33.2	4.5	6.2	±2.5 pp	1,501	telephone/online	3.5
Forum Research	January 25, 2014		28	24	38	5	4	±3.0 pp	1,228	IVR	10
Abacus Data	January 18, 2014		28	24	34	5	7	±2.2 pp	1,996	online	6
Forum Research	January 17, 2014		28	25	37	5	4	±2.0 pp	1,779	IVR	9
	December 26, 2013	Bloc Québécois leader Daniel Paillé steps down for health reasons, and Annie Lessard is named interim leader									
EKOS	December 15, 2013		26.2	22.9	32.1	6.3	9.3	±1.7 pp	3,468	IVR	5.9
Forum Research	December 13, 2013		32	21	38	5	3	±2.0 pp	1,634	IVR	6
Ipsos Reid	November 27, 2013		29	26	35	6	3	±3.5 pp	1,014	online	6
Harris-Decima	November 25, 2013		26	23	36	7	7	±2.2 pp	2,034	telephone	10
Forum Research	November 13, 2013		29	22	38	6	4	±2.0 pp	1,834	IVR	9
EKOS	October 29, 2013		26.4	24.9	37.4	5.2	5.2	±2.6 pp	1,377	telephone/online	11.0
Ipsos Reid	October 28, 2013		30	31	31	6	2	±3.4 pp	1,102	online	Tie
Forum Research	October 23, 2013		28	20	40	6	5	±3.0 pp	1,007	IVR	12
Forum Research	October 22, 2013		30	19	39	7	5	±2.0 pp	1,859	IVR	9
Abacus Data	October 22, 2013		32	23	32	5	7	±2.6 pp	1,459	online	Tie
Ipsos Reid	October 20, 2013		31	27	33	6	2	±3.4 pp	1,042	online	2
Nanos Research	October 18, 2013		29	23	37	5	5	±3.5 pp	1,000	telephone	8
EKOS	October 14, 2013		26.1	24.9	36.3	5.0	6.5	±2.5 pp	1,554	telephone/online	10.2
Ipsos Reid	September 20, 2013		32	26	31	7	3	±3.5 pp	1,035	online	1
Forum Research	September 17, 2013		31	21	36	7	4	±3.0 pp	1,527	IVR	5
Harris-Decima	September 9, 2013		29	24	33	6	6	±2.2 pp	2,020	telephone	4
Abacus Data	September 4, 2013		30	27	29	8	4	±2.5 pp	1,600	online	1
Nanos Research	August 31, 2013		30	25	33	5	5	±3.5 pp	1,000	telephone	3
Forum Research	August 23, 2013		29	22	38	6	4	±3.0 pp	1,189	IVR	9
Nanos Research	August 22, 2013		29.7	24.8	35.7	3.9	5.5	±3.3 pp	1,000	telephone/online	6.0
Nanos Research	August 19, 2013		31.9	22.8	35.3	2.5	5.9	±2.2 pp	2,000	telephone	3.4
Forum Research	July 23, 2013		31	22	35	7	4	±2.0 pp	1,782	IVR	4
EKOS	July 9, 2013		28.4	23.4	30.4	6.3	8.5	±1.8 pp	2,900	IVR	2.0
Environics	June 30, 2013		28	24	34	6	6	±2.4 pp	2,149	telephone	6
Ipsos Reid	June 25, 2013		30	28	33	6	4	±3.3 pp	1,177	online	3
Abacus Data	June 23, 2013		27	26	29	6	10	±3.1 pp	999	online	2
Leger Marketing	June 19, 2013		29	21	37	4	8	±2.5 pp	1,503	online	8
Nanos Research	June 19, 2013		29.4	25.3	34.2	3.7	6.4	±3.5 pp	1,000	telephone/online	4.8
Forum Research	June 18, 2013		30	20	38	6	4	±2.0 pp	1,525	IVR	8
Ipsos Reid	May 28, 2013		30	27	36	4	4	±3.5 pp	1,009	online	6
EKOS	May 26, 2013		26.3	20.9	34.7	5.4	9.2	±1.7 pp	3,318	IVR	8.4
Forum Research	May 22, 2013		27	20	44	4	3	±2.0 pp	1,779	IVR	17
EKOS	May 2, 2013		26.2	23.9	38.6	4.2	6.3	±2.7 pp	1,309	telephone/online	12.4
Ipsos Reid	April 30, 2013		32	25	35	5	3	±3.4 pp	1,059	online	3
Harris-Decima	April 28, 2013		28	22	35	6	7	±2.2 pp	2,008	telephone	7
Forum Research	April 15, 2013		30	19	43	5	2	±2.0 pp	1,764	IVR	13
	April 14, 2013	Justin Trudeau is elected leader of the Liberal Party.									
EKOS	April 10, 2013		28.8	23.3	29.1	6.4	9.0	±1.5 pp	4,568	IVR	0.3
Nanos Research	April 8, 2013		31.3	23.6	35.4	4.8	4.2	±3.3 pp	1,002	telephone/online	4.1
Abacus Data	April 6, 2013		33	27	27	5	7	±2.6 pp	1,511	online	6
Ipsos Reid	April 3, 2013		31	27	32	6	4	±3.4 pp	1,053		1
Forum Research	April 2, 2013		29	25	33	5	6	±3.0 pp	1,310	IVR	4
Leger Marketing	March 28, 2013		31	24	30	7	7	±2.5 pp	1,511	online	1
Abacus Data	March 21, 2013		32	31	24	5	8	±3.1 pp	1,014	online	1
Forum Research	March 7, 2013		31	27	30	6	5	±2.0 pp	1,755	IVR	1
Nanos Research	February 24, 2013		31.5	27.2	29.1	5.2	5.9	±3.7 pp	1,000	telephone	2.4
EKOS	February 10, 2013		29.3	26.3	24.6	7.2	9.5	±1.3 pp	5,947	IVR	3.0
Forum Research	February 6, 2013		32	26	30	6	4	±3.0 pp	1,091	IVR	2
Abacus Data	February 6, 2013		35	31	21	6	6	±2.3 pp	1,832	online	4
Nanos Research	January 31, 2013		34.3	27.1	27.6	4.6	4.7	±3.5 pp	1,000	telephone	6.7
Forum Research	January 17, 2013		36	28	25	7	4	±2.0 pp	1,626	IVR	8
Angus Reid	January 17, 2013		35	29	22	6	6	±2.2 pp	2,028	online	6
Angus Reid	January 3, 2013		35	33	19	6	6	±3.1 pp	1,012	online	2
Forum Research	December 18, 2012		31	28	27	6	6	±2.0 pp	1,355	IVR	3
Abacus Data	December 8, 2012		34	32	22	6	6	±2.6 pp	1,505	online	2
Leger Marketing	December 6, 2012		35	30	18	7	9	±2.5 pp	1,500	online	5
EKOS	December 3, 2012		31.9	25.8	24.4	6.7	8.4	±1.3 pp	5,433	IVR	6.1
Forum Research	November 19, 2012		33	28	28	6	4	±2.0 pp	1,849	IVR	5
Nanos Research	November 15, 2012		33.8	27.2	29.0	4.9	3.7	±3.5 pp	1,004	telephone	4.8
Abacus Data	November 11, 2012		36	29	22	7	6	±3.0 pp	1,068	online	7
Ipsos Reid	November 8, 2012		34	30	26	7	2	±2.5 pp	2,009	telephone/online	4
Forum Research	October 27, 2012		31	32	27	6	4	±2.0 pp	1,735	IVR	1
Nanos Research	October 11, 2012		33.3	27.9	30.1	4.7	2.9	±3.4 pp	1,000	telephone	3.2
Forum Research	September 26, 2012		35	30	25	6	3	±2.0 pp	1,707	IVR	5
Environics	September 23, 2012		31	35	20	9	5	±2.4 pp	2,000	telephone	4
Abacus Data	September 18, 2012		35	35	17	7	6	±2.9 pp	1,208	online	Tie
Harris-Decima	September 10, 2012		34	27	24	6	7	±2.2 pp	2,007	telephone	7
Nanos Research	September 9, 2012		32.4	30.4	24.6	5.8	5.0	±3.4 pp	1,000	telephone	2.0
Forum Research	August 22, 2012		34	34	22	6	4	±2.4 pp	1,720	IVR	Tie
Abacus Data	August 12, 2012		37	32	20	6	6	±2.2 pp	2,099	online	5
Forum Research	July 26, 2012		31	35	22	6	5	±2.4 pp	1,639	IVR	4
Nanos Research	July 12, 2012		33.6	30.3	26.5	4.4	4.2	±3.2 pp	1,200	telephone	3.3
EKOS	July 5, 2012		30.2	32.3	19.5	4.9	10.0	±2.1 pp	2,098	IVR	2.1
Forum Research	June 27, 2012		35	35	19	6	3	±2.9 pp	1,165	IVR	Tie
EKOS	June 26, 2012		29.3	32.4	19.2	6.5	9.5	±2.2 pp	2,049	IVR	3.1
Abacus Data	June 23, 2012		35	35	20	5	6	±3.1 pp	1,008	online	Tie
Environics	June 23, 2012		33	35	19	7	5	±2.4 pp	2,093	telephone	2
Ipsos Reid	June 21, 2012		35	38	18	6	4	±3.1 pp	1,099	online	3
Harris-Decima	June 18, 2012		31	32	23	5	7	±2.2 pp	2,000	telephone	1
Angus Reid	June 16, 2012		34	35	19	6	5	±2.5 pp	1,500	online	1
Forum Research	June 14, 2012		30	37	22	6	5	±2.5 pp	1,529	IVR	7
Nanos Research	May 31, 2012		33.5	33.6	24.9	3.4	2.4	±3.1 pp	1,201	telephone	0.1
Forum Research	May 23, 2012		32	36	20	5	6	±2.3 pp	1,836	IVR	4
Angus Reid	May 23, 2012		37	33	18	7	4	±3.1 pp	1,014	online	4
Abacus Data	May 16, 2012		37	35	17	6	5	±3.1 pp	1,008	online	2
Ipsos Reid	May 10, 2012		37	35	19	5	3	±2.0 pp	2,061	telephone/online	2
Environics	May 9, 2012		32	36	19	6	7	±3.5 pp	1,000	telephone	4
Harris-Decima	May 6, 2012		30	34	20	7	8	±2.2 pp	2,018	telephone	4
Harris-Decima	April 30, 2012		30	33	20	7	8	±3.1 pp	1,006	telephone	3
Forum Research	April 25, 2012		33	36	22	6	2	±2.4 pp	1,744	IVR	3
Nanos Research	April 18, 2012		34.7	32.4	23.3	3.9	4.2	±3.2 pp	1,200	telephone	2.3
Ipsos Reid	April 5, 2012		34	33	21	7	4	±2.0 pp	1,008	telephone	1
Leger Marketing	April 4, 2012		32	33	19	7	8	±2.5 pp	1,506	online	1
Harris-Decima	April 2, 2012		34	32	19	6	8	±2.2 pp	2,003	telephone	2
Forum Research	March 30, 2012		36	34	19	5	5	±2.4 pp	1,675	IVR	2
Forum Research	March 27, 2012		35	35	19	7	3	±2.4 pp	1,638	IVR	Tie
	March 24, 2012	Thomas Mulcair is elected leader of the New Democratic Party.									
Angus Reid	March 21, 2012		37	29	21	8	4	±3.1 pp	1,004	online	8
Innovative Research	March 21, 2012		37	25	24	6	7	±2.8 pp	1,193	online	12
Harris-Decima	March 19, 2012		31	28	24	8	7	±2.2 pp	2,005	telephone	3
Environics	March 18, 2012		30	30	20	8	7	±2.4 pp	2,000	telephone	Tie
Abacus Data	March 13, 2012		37	28	20	8	7	±3.1 pp	1,003	online	9
EKOS	March 11, 2012		35.4	29.7	19.6	5.8	8.1	±2.2 pp	2,011	telephone/online	5.7
Ipsos Reid	March 8, 2012		37	29	23	7	4	±2.0 pp	3,154	telephone/online	8
Leger Marketing	March 5, 2012		34	26	24	8	7	±2.0 pp	2,509	online	8
Forum Research	March 3, 2012		37	28	25	5	4	±2.4 pp	1,675	IVR	9
Nanos Research	February 29, 2012		35.7	25.0	29.5	4.9	3.4	±3.1 pp	1,203	telephone	6.2
EKOS	February 28, 2012		31.5	29.2	21.7	6.0	8.3	±1.6 pp	3,699	IVR	2.3
Forum Research	February 6, 2012		36	28	26	6	3	±2.8 pp	1,210	IVR	8
Nanos Research	January 23, 2012		35.7	25.2	27.6	5.6	4.5	±3.2 pp	1,201	telephone	8.1
Harris-Decima	January 22, 2012		32	29	25	5	7	±2.2 pp	2,000	telephone	3
Angus Reid	January 21, 2012		39	28	22	6	5	±3.1 pp	1,000	online	11
Abacus Data	January 19, 2012		37	28	21	6	7	±3.1 pp	1,000	online	9
Forum Research	January 13, 2012		35	28	25	6	4	±2.8 pp	1,211	IVR	7
EKOS	December 21, 2011		31.4	29.5	24.8	6.7	6.1	±2.2 pp	2,005	telephone/online	1.9
Nanos Research	December 18, 2011		36.5	28.7	25.6	4.4	3.8	±3.3 pp	1,201	telephone	7.8
Forum Research	December 13, 2011		33	27	21	6	8	±2.9 pp	1,160	IVR	6
Harris-Decima	December 12, 2011		34	28	22	6	7	±2.2 pp	2,005	telephone	6
	December 11, 2011	Daniel Paillé is elected leader of the Bloc Québécois at the party's 2011 leadership election.									
Abacus Data	December 4, 2011		40	31	18	6	5	±3.1 pp	1,004	online	9
Nanos Research	November 21, 2011		35.6	27.3	28.1	3.9	3.9	±3.2 pp	1,202	telephone	7.5
Ipsos Reid	November 9, 2011		37	31	21	6	3				6
Harris-Decima	November 6, 2011		36	29	22	5	7	±2.2 pp	2,000	telephone	7
Nanos Research	October 24, 2011		37.7	30.0	23.4	3.6	3.8	±3.2 pp	1,202	telephone	7.7
Nanos Research	October 2, 2011		39.0	29.0	24.5	3.5	2.9	±3.2 pp	1,209	telephone	10.0
Angus Reid	September 21, 2011		39	29	21	5	4	±2.4 pp	1,668	online	10
Leger Marketing	September 15, 2011		39	33	17	5	6	±2.4 pp	1,625	online	6
Nanos Research	September 1, 2011		39.5	33.1	20.7	2.6	3.4	±3.2 pp	1,210	telephone	6.4
Harris-Decima	August 29, 2011		33	33	21	6	7	±2.2 pp	2,026	telephone	Tie
	August 22, 2011	Jack Layton dies of cancer. Turmel assumes the position of Leader of the Opposition.									
Abacus Data	August 15, 2011		38	32	19	5	6	±3.2 pp	1,003	online	6
Angus Reid	August 9, 2011		39	31	19	6	4	±3.1 pp	1,005	online	8
Nanos Research	August 2, 2011		36.2	26.8	27.0	4.4	4.5	±3.1 pp	1,203	telephone	9.2
	July 25, 2011	Jack Layton temporarily steps down as leader of the NDP, due to cancer. Turmel is chosen to act as NDP leader during the leave.									
Abacus Data	June 24, 2011		41	32	17	6	5	±3.2 pp	1,005	online	9
Nanos Research	June 19, 2011		41.8	28.0	22.3	3.4	3.7	±3.1 pp	1,211	telephone	13.8
Nanos Research	May 29, 2011		39.7	29.9	21.5	2.7	4.8	±3.1 pp	1,205	telephone	9.8
	May 25, 2011	Michael Ignatieff resigns as leader of the Liberal Party, and Bob Rae is chosen as interim leader.									
Harris-Decima	May 22, 2011		38	33	15	5	7	±2.2 pp	2,000	telephone	5
Abacus Data	May 19, 2011		40	33	16	6	5	±2.5 pp	1,544	online	7
	May 4, 2011	Gilles Duceppe resigns as leader of the Bloc Québécois and Vivian Barbot is named as interim leader.									
2011 election	May 2, 2011		39.6	30.6	18.9	6.0	3.9				9.0

Notes

^{1} In cases when linked poll details distinguish between the margin of error associated with the total sample of respondents (including undecided and non-voters) and that of the subsample of decided/leaning voters, the latter is included in the table. Also not included is the margin of error created by rounding to the nearest whole number or any margin of error from methodological sources. Most online polls—because of their opt-in method of recruiting panellists which results in a non-random sample—cannot have a margin of error. In such cases, shown is what the margin of error would be for a survey using a random probability-based sample of equivalent size.
^{2} Refers to the total sample size, including undecided and non-voters.
^{3} "Telephone" refers to traditional telephone polls conducted by live interviewers; "IVR" refers to automated Interactive Voice Response polls conducted by telephone; "online" refers to polls conducted exclusively over the internet; "telephone/online" refers to polls which combine results from both telephone and online surveys, or for which respondents are initially recruited by telephone and then asked to complete an online survey. "Rolling" polls contain overlapping data from one poll to the next, with the fraction in parentheses indicating the proportion of independent data compared to the previous published poll in the series.

== Leadership polls ==
Aside from conducting the usual opinion surveys on general party preferences, polling firms also survey public opinion on who would make the best prime minister:

Polling firm	Last date of polling^{[1]}	Link	Stephen Harper	Thomas Mulcair	Justin Trudeau	Elizabeth May	Margin of error^{[1]}
Nanos Research	October 17, 2015		30.1	18.9	35.2	5.3	±2.2 pp
Nanos Research	October 16, 2015		30.2	19.0	35.0	5.3	±2.5 pp
Nanos Research	October 15, 2015		30.0	19.3	34.6	5.6	±2.8 pp
Nanos Research	October 14, 2015		29.2	20.1	33.9	5.8	±2.8 pp
Nanos Research	October 13, 2015		28.8	19.9	33.0	6.4	±2.8 pp
Ipsos Reid	October 13, 2015		32	30	38		±3.0 pp
Nanos Research	October 11, 2015		28.1	20.5	32.3	6.4	±2.8 pp
Nanos Research	October 10, 2015		28.2	22.6	30.2	5.8	±2.8 pp
Forum Research	October 9, 2015		26	22	29	8	±3 pp
Nanos Research	October 9, 2015		28.1	23.1	30.4	5.5	±2.8 pp
Nanos Research	October 8, 2015		30.8	22.8	29.8	4.9	±2.8 pp
Nanos Research	October 7, 2015		32.6	19.9	30.8	4.9	±2.8 pp
Forum Research	October 6, 2015		27	22	28	9	±3 pp
Nanos Research	October 6, 2015		33.2	18.7	30.4	5.8	±2.8 pp
Nanos Research	October 5, 2015		31.7	19.0	30.6	5.1	±2.8 pp
Nanos Research	October 4, 2015		31.1	20.7	30.2	5.4	±2.8 pp
Nanos Research	October 3, 2015		31.7	22.7	29.4	4.6	±2.8 pp
Nanos Research	October 2, 2015		32.6	24.4	27.7	4.8	±2.8 pp
Nanos Research	October 1, 2015		33.2	23.2	28.3	4.4	±2.8 pp
Léger Marketing	September 30, 2015		24	24	23		±2.1 pp
Nanos Research	September 30, 2015		32.9	24.1	27.3	4.3	±2.8 pp
Forum Research	September 29, 2015		29	25	22	9	±3 pp
Nanos Research	September 29, 2015		32.0	23.5	28.0	4.4	±2.8 pp
Nanos Research	September 28, 2015		31.4	24.8	27.4	4.0	±2.8 pp
Ipsos Reid	September 28, 2015		35	34	32		±3.0 pp
Nanos Research	September 27, 2015		32.4	23.7	25.9	4.5	±2.8 pp
Nanos Research	September 26, 2015		31.4	23.0	27.8	4.6	±2.8 pp
Nanos Research	September 25, 2015		30.2	24.4	27.2	5.5	±2.8 pp
Nanos Research	September 24, 2015		29.2	25.6	29.2	4.9	±2.8 pp
Forum Research	September 23, 2015		25	24	25	9	±3 pp
Nanos Research	September 23, 2015		30.1	26.0	28.3	5.1	±2.8 pp
Nanos Research	September 22, 2015		30.2	26.2	27.1	5.8	±2.8 pp
Nanos Research	September 21, 2015		30.3	26.1	27.0	6.1	±2.8 pp
Ipsos Reid	September 21, 2015		30	38	32		±3.4 pp
Nanos Research	September 20, 2015		29.3	25.9	25.3	6.1	±2.8 pp
Nanos Research	September 19, 2015		30.0	25.5	26.6	5.2	±2.8 pp
Forum Research	September 18, 2015		28	24	24	9	±3 pp
Nanos Research	September 18, 2015		29.7	26.3	25.5	6.0	±2.8 pp
Nanos Research	September 17, 2015		30.1	28.6	25.4	5.8	±2.8 pp
Nanos Research	September 16, 2015		31.2	28.1	24.6	6.2	±2.8 pp
Forum Research	September 15, 2015		25	30	19	8	±3 pp
Nanos Research	September 15, 2015		31.0	29.1	24.5	5.7	±2.8 pp
Nanos Research	September 14, 2015		31.6	28.5	24.3	5.9	±2.8 pp
Ipsos Reid	September 13, 2015		32	36	32		±3.6 pp
Nanos Research	September 13, 2015		29.4	29.6	25.6	5.2	±2.8 pp
Nanos Research	September 12, 2015		30.2	28.4	26.3	4.6	±2.8 pp
Nanos Research	September 11, 2015		29.9	27.0	28.3	4.0	±2.8 pp
Forum Research	September 10, 2015		25	31	22	7	±3 pp
Nanos Research	September 10, 2015		30.2	27.3	27.5	4.5	±2.8 pp
Innovative Research	September 10, 2015		23	24	20	6	
Nanos Research	September 9, 2015		28.2	27.7	28.5	4.5	±2.8 pp
Nanos Research	September 8, 2015		25.7	29.4	28.0	5.6	±2.8 pp
Ipsos Reid	September 8, 2015		29	39	32		±3.6 pp
Nanos Research	September 6, 2015		25.3	29.8	28.2	5.2	±2.8 pp
Leger Marketing	September 2, 2015		21	25	21		±2.1 pp
Forum Research	September 1, 2015		24	31	24	8	±3 pp
Nanos Research	August 28, 2015		29	28	22	5	±3.1 pp
Innovative Research	August 26, 2015		24	24	18	5	
Ipsos Reid	August 26, 2015		31	37	32		±3.1 pp
Forum Research	August 24, 2015		22	32	22	8	±3 pp
Angus Reid	August 24, 2015		26	29	18		±1.2 pp
Nanos Research	August 21, 2015		29	27	22	4	±3.1 pp
Forum Research	August 19, 2015		24	29	21	9	±3 pp
Nanos Research	August 14, 2015		30	26	21	4	±3.1 pp
Leger Marketing	August 12, 2015		21	28	20		±2.1 pp
Forum Research	August 11, 2015		25	28	23	7	±3 pp
Nanos Research	August 7, 2015		31	27	21	3	±3.1 pp
Forum Research	August 2, 2015		24	31	22	5	±3 pp
Nanos Research	July 31, 2015		31	28	22	3	±3.1 pp
Innovative Research	July 30, 2015		27	31	19	6	
Forum Research	July 28, 2015		29	30	19	6	±3 pp
Nanos Research	July 24, 2015		30	29	22	3	±3.1 pp
Forum Research	July 20, 2015		25	29	20	6	±3 pp
Nanos Research	July 17, 2015		29	29	23	4	±3.1 pp
Leger Marketing	July 16, 2015		25	27	16		±2.5 pp
Forum Research	July 13, 2015		22	31	21	5	±3 pp
Nanos Research	July 10, 2015		26	28	25	4	±3.1 pp
Forum Research	July 7, 2015		25	27	23	6	±3 pp
Nanos Research	July 3, 2015		27	27	26	4	±3.1 pp
Forum Research	June 29, 2015		25	29	21	7	±3 pp
Nanos Research	June 26, 2015		28	25	27	4	±3.1 pp
Nanos Research	June 19, 2015		27	27	27	3	±3.1 pp
Nanos Research	June 12, 2015		29	28	26	3	±3.1 pp
Angus Reid	June 7, 2015		26	24	19		±1.2 pp
Nanos Research	June 5, 2015		29	25	27	4	±3.1 pp
Nanos Research	May 29, 2015		29	22	27	4	±3.1 pp
Nanos Research	May 22, 2015		32	20	29	5	±3.1 pp
Nanos Research	May 15, 2015		31	20	29	5	±3.1 pp
Nanos Research	May 8, 2015		31	21	28	5	±3.1 pp
Nanos Research	May 1, 2015		31	21	30	5	±3.1 pp
Leger Marketing	April 30, 2015		25	19	23		±2.5 pp
Nanos Research	April 24, 2015		29	21	30	5	±3.1 pp
Nanos Research	April 17, 2015		29	20	31	5	±3.1 pp
Nanos Research	April 10, 2015		31	19	30	4	±3.1 pp
Ipsos Reid	April 7, 2015		38	31	30		±3.1 pp
Nanos Research	April 3, 2015		31	18	29	4	±3.1 pp
Nanos Research	March 27, 2015		31	17	31	4	±3.1 pp
Nanos Research	March 20, 2015		34	16	31	4	±3.1 pp
Leger Marketing	March 18, 2015		25	17	23		±2.5 pp
Nanos Research	March 13, 2015		34	16	30	4	±3.1 pp
Nanos Research	March 6, 2015		34	17	31	4	±3.1 pp
Nanos Research	February 27, 2015		34	17	31	4	±3.1 pp
Nanos Research	February 20, 2015		33	16	31	4	±3.1 pp
Nanos Research	February 13, 2015		33	16	31	4	±3.1 pp
Nanos Research	February 6, 2015		32	17	31	3	±3.1 pp
Leger Marketing	February 2, 2015		25	16	23		±2.5 pp
Nanos Research	January 30, 2015		31	17	31	3	±3.1 pp
Nanos Research	January 23, 2015		31	19	30	4	±3.1 pp
Nanos Research	January 16, 2015		31	18	31	5	±3.1 pp
Nanos Research	January 9, 2015		30	18	31	5	±3.1 pp
Nanos Research	January 2, 2015		33	18	30	4	±3.1 pp
Nanos Research	December 26, 2014		33	18	32	4	±3.1 pp
Nanos Research	December 19, 2014		33	18	31	4	±3.1 pp
Angus Reid	December 13, 2014		30	16	28		±1.2 pp
Nanos Research	December 12, 2014		33	19	31	3	±3.1 pp
Leger Marketing	December 11, 2014		24	16	27		±2.5 pp
Nanos Research	December 5, 2014		32	20	30	4	±3.1 pp
Nanos Research	November 28, 2014		33	20	29	3	±3.1 pp
Nanos Research	November 21, 2014		32	20	29	3	±3.1 pp
Nanos Research	November 14, 2014		32	20	29	3	±3.1 pp
Nanos Research	November 7, 2014		32	20	30	4	±3.1 pp
Leger Marketing	November 6, 2014		26	16	28		±2.5 pp
Nanos Research	October 31, 2014		29	20	32	4	±3.1 pp
Nanos Research	October 24, 2014		29	19	34	5	±3.1 pp
Nanos Research	October 17, 2014		30	18	35	4	±3.1 pp
Leger Marketing	October 16, 2014		23	17	26		±2.5 pp
Nanos Research	October 10, 2014		30	17	35	4	±3.1 pp
Nanos Research	October 3, 2014		28	18	36	4	±3.1 pp
Nanos Research	September 26, 2014		28	18	35	3	±3.1 pp
Angus Reid	September 19, 2014		27	14	27	4	±2.5 pp
Nanos Research	September 19, 2014		28	18	34	5	±3.1 pp
Nanos Research	September 12, 2014		28	17	34	5	±3.1 pp
Nanos Research	September 5, 2014		29	15	34	5	±3.1 pp
Nanos Research	August 29, 2014		28	15	34	6	±3.1 pp
Nanos Research	August 22, 2014		27	16	32	6	±3.1 pp
Forum Research	August 19, 2014		29	15	31	8	±2 pp
Nanos Research	August 15, 2014		26	19	32	6	±3.1 pp
Nanos Research	August 8, 2014		26	19	31	7	±3.1 pp
Nanos Research	August 1, 2014		29	20	29	6	±3.1 pp
Nanos Research	July 25, 2014		30	20	30	5	±3.1 pp
Forum Research	July 18, 2014		27	16	30	7	±2 pp
Nanos Research	July 18, 2014		31	18	31	5	±3.1 pp
Nanos Research	July 11, 2014		31	19	29	5	±3.1 pp
Nanos Research	July 4, 2014		29	18	30	7	±3.1 pp
Nanos Research	June 27, 2014		28	17	31	7	±3.1 pp
Nanos Research	June 20, 2014		30	16	30	6	±3.1 pp
Forum Research	June 17, 2014		28	16	27	8	±2 pp
Nanos Research	June 13, 2014		28	14	33	7	±3.1 pp
Angus Reid	June 12, 2014		27	17	23	5	±1.2 pp
Nanos Research	June 6, 2014		30	14	32	6	±3.1 pp
Nanos Research	May 30, 2014		32	15	30	6	±3.1 pp
Angus Reid	May 23, 2014		27	17	23	4	±3.4 pp
Forum Research	May 23, 2014		26	17	28	8	±2 pp
Nanos Research	May 23, 2014		30	17	30	7	±3.1 pp
Nanos Research	May 16, 2014		31	19	27	6	±3.1 pp
Nanos Research	May 9, 2014		30	19	27	6	±3.1 pp
Nanos Research	May 2, 2014		27	20	27	6	±3.1 pp
Forum Research	April 29, 2014		25	17	30	10	±2 pp
Nanos Research	April 25, 2014		29	19	26	6	±3.1 pp
Nanos Research	April 18, 2014		29	19	27	6	±3.1 pp
Angus Reid	April 15, 2014		27	16	20	4	±3.4 pp
Nanos Research	April 11, 2014		30	20	27	6	±3.1 pp
Nanos Research	April 4, 2014		31	20	28	6	±3.1 pp
Forum Research	March 28, 2014		27	17	29	8	±2 pp
Nanos Research	March 28, 2014		30	18	29	6	±3.1 pp
Nanos Research	March 21, 2014		29	18	31	5	±3.1 pp
Nanos Research	March 14, 2014		27	17	32	6	±3.1 pp
Angus Reid	March 9, 2014		23	17	24	4	±1.2 pp
Nanos Research	March 7, 2014		26	18	31	6	±3.1 pp
Nanos Research	February 28, 2014		25	19	32	5	±3.1 pp
Nanos Research	February 21, 2014		28	19	29	5	±3.1 pp
Forum Research	February 19, 2014		26	16	33	8	±2 pp
Angus Reid	February 16, 2014		32	22	36	9	±2.5 pp
Nanos Research	February 14, 2014		28	19	30	4	±3.1 pp
Nanos Research	February 7, 2014		28	19	29	4	±3.1 pp
Ipsos Reid	February 4, 2014		34	24	42	–	±3.5 pp
Nanos Research	January 31, 2014		29	19	29	4	±3.1 pp
Forum Research	January 25, 2014		24	18	29	7	±3 pp
Nanos Research	January 24, 2014		27	21	29	4	±3.1 pp
Forum Research	January 17, 2014		25	19	29	7	±2 pp
Nanos Research	January 17, 2014		28	21	27	4	±3.1 pp
Nanos Research	January 10, 2014		27	20	29	4	±3.1 pp
Nanos Research	January 3, 2014		27	19	29	5	±3.1 pp
Nanos Research	December 27, 2013		27	18	29	5	±3.1 pp
Nanos Research	December 20, 2013		26	18	30	5	±3.1 pp
Forum Research	December 13, 2013		27	17	29	6	±2 pp
Nanos Research	December 13, 2013		28	18	27	6	±3.1 pp
Nanos Research	December 6, 2013		27	20	26	6	±3.1 pp
Nanos Research	November 29, 2013		27	20	26	5	±3.1 pp
Nanos Research	November 22, 2013		29	20	27	5	±3.1 pp
Nanos Research	November 15, 2013		27	19	29	5	±3.1 pp
Forum Research	November 13, 2013		25	17	27	7	±2 pp
Nanos Research	November 8, 2013		29	17	31	4	±3.1 pp
Nanos Research	November 1, 2013		30	16	32	4	±3.1 pp
Nanos Research	October 25, 2013		30	16	32	5	±3.1 pp
Forum Research	October 23, 2013		25	15	31	9	±3 pp
Forum Research	October 22, 2013		25	13	29	7	±3 pp
Abacus Data	October 22, 2013		24	12	26	4	±2.6 pp
Nanos Research	October 18, 2013		31	16	32	5	±3.1 pp
Nanos Research	October 11, 2013		30	16	33	5	±3.1 pp
Nanos Research	October 4, 2013		29	15	31	5	±3.1 pp
Forum Research	September 17, 2013		27	15	30	6	±3 pp
Harris-Decima	August 25, 2013		29	14	33	–	±3.1 pp
Forum Research	August 23, 2013		24	16	32	9	±3 pp
Leger Marketing	June 19, 2013		23	14	27	6	±2.5 pp
Harris-Decima	April 21, 2013		31	18	33	–	±3.1 pp

== See also ==
- Opinion polling in the Canadian federal election, 2015 by constituency
- Opinion polling in the Canadian federal election, 2006
- Opinion polling in the Canadian federal election, 2008
- Opinion polling in the Canadian federal election, 2011
