= Opinion polling for the 2008 Canadian federal election =

Polls leading up to the 2008 Canadian federal election.

== Polls ==
The dates listed are normally the date the survey was concluded. Most news and political affairs sources use the convention of using the last date that the poll was conducted in order to establish the inclusion/exclusion of current events.

Polling firm	Last date of polling	Source	CPC	LPC	NDP	BQ	GPC
Election 2008	October 14, 2008	HTML	37.6	26.2	18.2	10.0	6.8
Asking Canadians	October 13, 2008	HTML	38.0	22.6	22.6	9.5	7.1
EKOS Research Associates	October 13, 2008	HTML	34.8	26.4	19.4	9.8	9.6
Angus Reid Strategies	October 13, 2008	PDF	37	27	20	9	7
Nanos Research	October 12, 2008	PDF	34.2	26.7	21.4	9.5	8.2
EKOS Research Associates	October 12, 2008	HTML	34	26	18	10	11
Harris-Decima	October 12, 2008	PDF	34	25	19	11	9
Strategic Counsel	October 11, 2008	HTML	33	28	18	10	11
Nanos Research	October 11, 2008	PDF	33	27	22	10	9
Harris-Decima	October 11, 2008	PDF	35	26	18	10	9
EKOS Research Associates	October 11, 2008	HTML	34	27	18	10	11
Strategic Counsel	October 10, 2008	HTML	35	28	19	9	9
Harris-Decima	October 10, 2008	PDF	35	25	18	9	11
Nanos Research	October 10, 2008	PDF	32	28	22	10	8
Angus Reid Strategies	October 10, 2008	PDF	38	28	19	9	6
EKOS Research Associates	October 10, 2008	HTML	34	26	19	10	11
Ipsos Reid	October 9, 2008	HTML	34	29	18	9	8
Segma	October 9, 2008	PDF	35	23	21	10	10
Nanos Research	October 9, 2008	PDF	33	27	22	10	8
Harris-Decima	October 9, 2008	PDF	34	26	18	9	12
EKOS Research Associates	October 9, 2008	HTML	36	24	19	10	11
Nanos Research	October 8, 2008	PDF	33	29	20	10	7
Harris-Decima	October 8, 2008	PDF	32	27	19	8	12
EKOS Research Associates	October 8, 2008	HTML	35	24	20	10	11
Nanos Research	October 7, 2008	PDF	33	29	20	11	7
Angus Reid Strategies	October 7, 2008	PDF	35	27	18	9	10
Harris-Decima	October 7, 2008	PDF	31	27	20	8	12
EKOS Research Associates	October 7, 2008	HTML	34	25	20	10	11
Harris-Decima	October 6, 2008	PDF	31	26	21	8	13
Nanos Research	October 6, 2008	PDF	34	31	18	11	6
EKOS Research Associates	October 6, 2008	HTML	33	26	19	10	12
Harris-Decima	October 5, 2008	PDF	32	25	21	8	12
Nanos Research	October 5, 2008	PDF	34	29	20	11	6
EKOS Research Associates	October 5, 2008	HTML	35	25	19	10	10
Harris-Decima	October 4, 2008	PDF	34	24	20	8	13
Nanos Research	October 4, 2008	PDF	34	30	19	10	7
EKOS Research Associates	October 4, 2008	HTML	36	25	18	10	10
Angus Reid Strategies	October 3, 2008	PDF	40	25	19	11	6
Harris-Decima	October 3, 2008	PDF	35	22	20	9	13
Nanos Research	October 3, 2008	PDF	35	28	19	10	8
EKOS Research Associates	October 3, 2008	HTML	36	25	19	10	10
Ipsos Reid	October 2, 2008	HTML	37	23	19	11	10
Harris-Decima	October 2, 2008	PDF	37	22	18	9	12
Nanos Research	October 2, 2008	PDF	35	30	18	10	9
EKOS Research Associates	October 2, 2008	HTML	36	24	19	10	11
Harris-Decima	October 1, 2008	PDF	36	23	18	9	12
Nanos Research	October 1, 2008	PDF	37	26	19	10	8
EKOS Research Associates	October 1, 2008	HTML	34	25	19	10	11
Harris-Decima	September 30, 2008	PDF	36	24	17	10	11
Nanos Research	September 30, 2008	PDF	36	26	20	10	9
EKOS Research Associates	September 30, 2008	HTML	34	25	20	10	11
Strategic Counsel	September 29, 2008	HTML	39	24	19	10	9
Harris-Decima	September 29, 2008	PDF	36	26	18	9	11
Nanos Research	September 29, 2008	PDF	37	26	20	10	8
EKOS Research Associates	September 29, 2008	HTML	34	27	19	9	10
Harris-Decima	September 28, 2008	PDF	36	26	19	8	9
Nanos Research	September 28, 2008	PDF	36	26	20	9	9
EKOS Research Associates	September 28, 2008	HTML	34	26	20	10	10
Nanos Research	September 27, 2008	PDF	36	27	19	9	9
Harris-Decima	September 27, 2008	PDF	36	25	19	9	9
Nanos Research	September 26, 2008	PDF	39	25	19	8	9
Harris-Decima	September 26, 2008	PDF	38	23	19	9	9
Angus Reid Strategies	September 25, 2008	PDF	40	21	21	10	7
Ipsos Reid	September 25, 2008	HTML	39	23	18	9	11
Nanos Research	September 25, 2008	PDF	39	24	19	9	8
Harris-Decima	September 25, 2008	PDF	37	24	18	9	10
EKOS Research Associates	September 25, 2008	HTML	35	25	20	10	10
Nanos Research	September 24, 2008	PDF	40	25	19	9	8
EKOS Research Associates	September 24, 2008	HTML	36	25	19	10	11
Harris-Decima	September 24, 2008	HTML	36	23	17	9	12
EKOS Research Associates	September 23, 2008	HTML	37	24	19	9	11
Harris-Decima	September 23, 2008	PDF	37	24	16	9	12
Nanos Research	September 23, 2008	PDF	37	26	21	9	7
EKOS Research Associates	September 22, 2008	HTML	36	25	19	8	12
Nanos Research	September 22, 2008	PDF	38	27	21	8	6
Harris-Decima	September 22, 2008	HTML	37	24	17	8	11
EKOS Research Associates	September 21, 2008	HTML	37	24	19	8	12
Nanos Research	September 21, 2008	PDF	35	30	22	7	6
Harris-Decima	September 21, 2008	PDF	38	23	17	8	12
Nanos Research	September 20, 2008	PDF	36	31	20	7	7
Harris-Decima	September 20, 2008	PDF	39	23	17	8	11
Nanos Research	September 19, 2008	PDF	38	29	18	7	7
Harris-Decima	September 19, 2008	PDF	38	23	17	8	12
Angus Reid Strategies	September 18, 2008	PDF	38	24	19	9	10
Ipsos Reid	September 18, 2008	HTML	40	27	15	8	10
EKOS Research Associates	September 18, 2008	HTML	36	25	18	8	13
Nanos Research	September 18, 2008	PDF	39	28	18	7	7
Harris-Decima	September 18, 2008	PDF	38	25	15	8	12
Nanos Research	September 17, 2008	PDF	39	30	18	7	6
Harris-Decima	September 17, 2008	PDF	36	27	16	8	11
EKOS Research Associates	September 17, 2008	HTML	38	24	18	8	12
Nanos Research	September 16, 2008	PDF	38	31	17	7	7
Harris-Decima	September 16, 2008	PDF	38	28	15	8	10
EKOS Research Associates	September 16, 2008	HTML	38	24	19	8	11
Nanos Research	September 15, 2008	PDF	38	31	17	6	8
Harris-Decima	September 15, 2008	PDF	38	27	16	8	10
EKOS Research Associates	September 15, 2008	HTML	38	23	19	9	11
Segma	September 15, 2008	PDF	42	23	16	7	10
Nanos Research	September 14, 2008	PDF	37	31	18	6	9
Harris-Decima	September 14, 2008	PDF	38	27	16	8	9
EKOS Research Associates	September 14, 2008	HTML	35	25	19	9	11
Ipsos Reid	September 13, 2008	HTML	38	29	13	8	11
Harris-Decima	September 13, 2008	PDF	40	26	15	8	9
Nanos Research	September 13, 2008	PDF	38	30	17	6	9
Angus Reid Strategies	September 12, 2008	PDF	39	23	18	9	10
Nanos Research	September 12, 2008	PDF	38	30	15	9	9
EKOS Research Associates	September 11, 2008	HTML	36	26	19	8	11
Ipsos Reid	September 11, 2008	HTML	38	29	13	8	11
Nanos Research	September 11, 2008	HTML	38	31	14	9	9
Harris-Decima	September 11, 2008	HTML	41	26	14	8	9
Nanos Research	September 10, 2008	HTML	37	32	13	9	9
EKOS Research Associates	September 9, 2008	HTML	37	26	19	8	10
Angus Reid Strategies	September 9, 2008	PDF	38	24	21	9	7
Harris-Decima	September 8, 2008	PDF	36	28	15	9	9
Segma	September 6, 2008	PDF	43	25	15	8	7
EKOS Research Associates	September 4, 2008	HTML	38	26	15	10	11
EKOS Research Associates	September 3, 2008	HTML	37	24	19	6	10
Environics	September 2, 2008	HTML	38	28	19	8	7
Strategic Counsel	August 31, 2008	PDF	37	29	17	8	9
Ipsos Reid	August 28, 2008	HTML	34	31	14	-	10
Angus Reid Strategies	August 28, 2008	PDF	36	28	18	9	8
Ipsos Reid	August 28, 2008	HTML	33	31	16	9	10
Nanos Research	August 27, 2008	PDF	33	35	17	8	7
Harris-Decima	August 24, 2008	PDF	33	34	15	7	9
Ipsos Reid	August 14, 2008	HTML	36	30	14	9	10
Harris-Decima	August 10, 2008	PDF	32	33	15	6	13
Ipsos Reid	July 31, 2008	HTML	34	30	14	9	11
Angus Reid Strategies	July 30, 2008	PDF	35	30	17	9	8
Ipsos Reid	July 10, 2008	HTML	33	32	13	11	10
Environics	July 5, 2008	HTML	35	30	17	10	8
Harris-Decima	June 29, 2008	PDF	30	31	16	10	12
Angus Reid Strategies	June 24, 2008	PDF	33	30	19	9	7
Strategic Counsel	June 9, 2008	HTML	32	30	18	10	10
Harris-Decima	June 8, 2008	HTML	32	31	15	6	12
Ipsos-Reid	May 29, 2008	HTML	36	29	14	9	11
Angus Reid Strategies	May 19, 2008	HTML	34	27	18	11	8
Nanos Research	May 11, 2008	PDF	33	34	15	11	8
Strategic Counsel	May 11, 2008	HTML	34	31	16	9	10
Ipsos-Reid	May 8, 2008	HTML	35	32	14	-	9
Ipsos-Reid	May 1, 2008	HTML	34	29	17	-	11
Angus Reid Strategies	April 23, 2008	PDF	33	30	20	8	8
Harris-Decima	April 21, 2008	HTML	32	33	14	-	-
Harris-Decima	April 13, 2008	HTML	30	33	16	9	11
Strategic Counsel	April 13, 2008	HTML	36	30	15	8	10
Ipsos-Reid	April 10, 2008	HTML	35	30	16	-	10
Segma	April 9, 2008	HTML	36	30	15	9	9
Nanos Research	April 9, 2008	PDF	36	36	14	8	6
Environics	April 7, 2008	HTML	35	28	17	13	7
Harris-Decima	April 6, 2008	HTML	31	32	15	9	12
Harris-Decima	March 30, 2008	HTML	32	30	13	9	12
Angus Reid Strategies	March 28, 2008	HTML	36	26	18	9	9
Ipsos-Reid	March 20, 2008	HTML	35	33	13	10	8
Harris-Decima	March 16, 2008	HTML	32	32	17	9	8
Strategic Counsel	March 16, 2008	HTML	38	27	14	10	12
Ipsos-Reid	March 6, 2008	HTML	35	31	15	9	9
Harris-Decima	March 2, 2008	HTML	31	30	17	8	13
Angus Reid Strategies	March 2, 2008	HTML	34	28	18	10	9
Nanos Research	February 20, 2008	PDF	34	34	14	10	8
Angus Reid Strategies	February 18, 2008	HTML	34	31	17	9	8
Harris-Decima	February 17, 2008	PDF	35	33	13	8	9
Strategic Counsel	February 17, 2008	HTML	39	27	12	10	12
Ipsos-Reid	February 14, 2008	HTML	36	29	13	9	10
Léger Marketing	February 10, 2008	PDF	37	32	16	8	7
Nanos Research	February 4, 2008	PDF	31	33	19	10	8
UniMarketing	January 31, 2008	HTML	33	33	18	8	8
Harris-Decima	January 27, 2008	HTML	29	32	16	9	12
Ipsos-Reid	January 24, 2008	HTML	37	29	14	-	10
Strategic Counsel	January 13, 2008	PDF	36	30	14	11	10
Ipsos-Reid	January 10, 2008	HTML	33	35	13	9	9
Harris-Decima	January 6, 2008	PDF	37	30	13	10	9
Environics	January 3, 2008	HTML	36	22	17	13	7
Ipsos-Reid	December 20, 2007	HTML	35	33	15	8	8
Harris-Decima	December 17, 2007	HTML	30	32	15	11	12
Angus Reid Strategies	December 14, 2007	PDF	33	28	17	10	10
Strategic Counsel	December 9, 2007	PDF	32	29	16	10	13
Ipsos-Reid	December 6, 2007	HTML	35	29	16	10	9
Harris-Decima	December 2, 2007	HTML	36	28	17	8	11
Ipsos-Reid	November 22, 2007	HTML	39	29	15	8	8
Harris-Decima	November 19, 2007	PDF	36	28	17	8	9
Strategic Counsel	November 13, 2007	PDF	34	31	16	11	8
Harris-Decima	November 12, 2007	HTML	33	29	17	8	12
Strategic Counsel	November 11, 2007	PDF	32	32	12	11	13
SES Research	November 8, 2007	PDF	35	34	17	9	6
Ipsos-Reid	November 8, 2007	HTML	42	28	15	8	7
Ipsos-Reid	November 1, 2007	HTML	39	28	13	12	7
Harris-Decima	October 29, 2007	HTML	33	29	17	9	10
Ipsos-Reid	October 25, 2007	HTML	39	27	17	9	8
Unimarketing	October 18, 2007	HTML	36	25	19	10	9
Ipsos-Reid	October 18, 2007	HTML	40	27	14	9	8
Angus Reid Strategies	October 17, 2007	HTML	34	29	17	9	9
Environics	October 14, 2007	HTML	33	29	19	7	11
Strategic Counsel	October 14, 2007	HTML	34	29	15	10	12
Ipsos-Reid	October 13, 2007	HTML	40	28	16	8	7
Harris-Decima	October 9, 2007	HTML	35	28	17	8	10
Harris-Decima	October 3, 2007	HTML	33	31	16	7	10
Harris-Decima	September 18, 2007	HTML	32	29	17	5	14
Angus Reid Strategies	August 23, 2007	HTML	33	29	19	9	9
SES Research	August 14, 2007	PDF	36	33	13	10	8
Strategic Counsel	August 12, 2007	PDF	33	33	17	10	8
Ipsos-Reid	July 27, 2007	HTML	34	32	17	8	8
Angus Reid Strategies	July 18, 2007	PDF	33	28	19	9	8
Strategic Counsel	July 15, 2007	HTML	31	31	17	10	10
Environics	June 30, 2007	HTML	37	28	17	7	11
Angus Reid Strategies	June 18, 2007	PDF	34	27	19	10	8
Decima	June 11, 2007	HTML	29	32	18	9	9
Ipsos Reid	May 31, 2007	HTML	34	31	16	10	9
Léger Marketing	May 27, 2007	PDF	37	30	14	8	9
Ipsos Reid	May 24, 2007	HTML	37	31	16	7	9
Angus Reid Strategies	May 23, 2007	HTML	35	28	18	9	9
Decima	May 20, 2007	HTML	33	31	17	8	10
Strategic Counsel	May 17, 2007	HTML	34	31	16	10	9
Ipsos Reid	May 17, 2007	HTML	36	32	14	9	7
Ipsos Reid	May 10, 2007	HTML	31	32	17	9	9
SES Research	May 3, 2007	HTML	32	33	17	9	10
Ipsos Reid	May 3, 2007	HTML	35	34	14	9	7
Decima	April 29, 2007	HTML	30	31	15	9	13
Ipsos Reid	April 26, 2007	HTML	38	31	14	8	8
Strategic Counsel	April 24, 2007	PDF	36	30	13	9	12
Decima Research	April 21, 2007	HTML	30	29	18	8	11
Ipsos Reid	April 19, 2007	HTML	39	29	16	9	7
Decima Research	April 15, 2007	HTML	34	31	15	7	11
Ipsos Reid	April 12, 2007	HTML	38	32	14	8	8
SES Research	April 5, 2007	PDF	36	33	16	10	6
Decima Research	April 5, 2007	HTML	39	30	13	8	8
Environics	April 3, 2007	HTML	36	28	16	8	12
Ipsos Reid	March 28, 2007	HTML	36	31	15	8	9
Angus Reid Strategies	March 28, 2007	PDF	39	22	17	10	11
Decima Research	March 25, 2007	HTML	35	31	13	8	10
Léger Marketing	March 25, 2007	HTML	41	27	14	9	6
Ipsos-Reid	March 22, 2007	HTML	40	29	14	9	7
Strategic Counsel	March 21, 2007	HTML	39	31	13	8	9
Ipsos-Reid	March 15, 2007	HTML	36	34	12	9	8
Strategic Counsel	March 13, 2007	HTML	36	31	15	9	10
Angus Reid Strategies	March 7, 2007	HTML	38	28	15	10	8
Decima Research	March 4, 2007	HTML	35	29	15	7	11
Ipsos-Reid	March 3, 2007	HTML	36	32	15	8	8
Angus Reid Strategies	February 27, 2007	HTML	40	26	15	10	8
Decima Research	February 26, 2007	HTML	36	27	13	8	13
Ipsos-Reid	February 24, 2007	HTML	36	34	13	9	8
Decima Research	February 18, 2007	HTML	32	30	15	9	11
Strategic Counsel	February 18, 2007	HTML	34	29	14	11	12
Decima Research	February 12, 2007	HTML	32	33	15	9	8
SES Research	February 8, 2007	PDF	33	33	17	10	7
Léger Marketing	February 4, 2007	PDF	38	31	14	8	7
Decima Research	January 22, 2007	HTML	32	33	13	13	9
Léger Marketing	January 21, 2007	HTML	35	32	13	8	9
Ipsos-Reid	January 18, 2007	HTML	33	37	13	-	-
Decima Research	January 15, 2007	HTML	32	33	13	10	9
Strategic Counsel	January 14, 2007	HTML	31	35	15	11	8
Environics	December 30, 2006	HTML	34	32	14	8	11
Decima Research	December 30, 2006	HTML	34	31	15	10	8
Ipsos-Reid	December 14, 2006	HTML	34	36	13	10	5
Decima Research	December 13, 2006	HTML	32	35	12	11	7
EKOS	December 9, 2006	HTML	33	40	10	9	8
Ipsos-Reid	December 7, 2006	HTML	32	38	13	11	5
Decima Research	December 3, 2006	PDF	31	35	12	10	11
Strategic Counsel	December 3, 2006	HTML	31	37	14	11	7
Léger Marketing	November 26, 2006	HTML	34	32	15	10	6
Decima Research	November 13, 2006	HTML	31	33	15	10	10
SES Research	November 9, 2006	PDF	34	32	16	13	5
Environics	November 6, 2006	HTML	33	32	19	9	5
Decima Research	November 5, 2006	HTML	31	28	18	10	9
Ipsos-Reid	November 2, 2006	HTML	37	29	19	9	5
Decima Research	October 16, 2006	HTML	32	30	15	11	10
Strategic Counsel	October 15, 2006	HTML	32	32	17	11	9
EKOS	October 12, 2006	HTML	36	31.7	16.2	9.9	6.2
Environics	October 12, 2006		37	28	18	9	7
Strategic Counsel	September 17, 2006	HTML	35	26	19	12	8
EKOS	September 14, 2006	PDF	38.7	28.8	17.0	8.4	7.0
Decima Research	September 4, 2006		34	30	14	11	10
Decima Research	August 28, 2006	PDF	33	28	19	10	8
Ipsos-Reid	August 24, 2006		38	29	17	10	5
SES Research	August 23, 2006	PDF	36	30	18	11	5
Decima Research	August 13, 2006	PDF	36	29	15	10	7
Decima Research	July 31, 2006	PDF	32	31	16	11	8
Strategic Counsel	July 30, 2006	HTML	38	29	15	11	8
Ipsos-Reid	July 27, 2006	HTML	39	27	17	10	7
Decima Research	July 23, 2006	HTML	36	30	17	-	-
Decima Research (without Greens)	July 16, 2006	PDF	36	30	19	11	-
Decima Research (with Greens)	July 16, 2006	PDF	36	29	16	10	8
Strategic Counsel	July 16, 2006	HTML	37	26	18	11	8
Environics	June 23, 2006	HTML	39	25	21	9	4
Decima Research	June 18, 2006	HTML	38	28	19	10	-
Strategic Counsel	June 8, 2006	PDF	36	27	19	9	9
Decima Research	May 28, 2006	PDF	38	29	21	8	-
Ipsos-Reid	May 18, 2006	HTML	43	25	15	9	5
SES Research	May 9, 2006	PDF	38	28	19	9	6
Strategic Counsel	May 3, 2006	HTML	35	31	16	10	9
Decima Research	April 23, 2006	HTML	41	26	19	10	-
Strategic Counsel	April 9, 2006	HTML	39	29	14	11	5
Environics	March 31, 2006	HTML	41	22	21	10	5
Decima Research	March 26, 2006	HTML	39	28	19	11	-
Ipsos-Reid	March 23, 2006	HTML	38	28	19	9	5
Decima Research	March 13, 2006	HTML	37	28	19	10	-
Decima Research	February 27, 2006	HTML	35	28	21	10	-
Ipsos-Reid	February 23, 2006	HTML	39	27	20	8	5
Strategic Counsel	February 21, 2006	HTML	39	28	19	8	-
Decima Research	February 13, 2006	PDF	35	25	24	8	-
SES Research	February 9, 2006	PDF	33	34	18	9	7
Election 2006	January 23, 2006	HTML	36.3	30.2	17.5	10.5	4.5

== Leadership polls ==
Aside from conducting the usual opinion surveys on general party preferences, polling firms also survey public opinion on who would make the best prime minister:

Polling firm	Last date of polling	Source	Stephen Harper	Stéphane Dion	Jack Layton	Gilles Duceppe	Elizabeth May
Nanos Research	October 5, 2008	PDF	33	18	21	3	4
Nanos Research	October 4, 2008	PDF	32	20	19	3	4
Nanos Research	October 3, 2008	PDF	32	17	19	4	4
Nanos Research	October 2, 2008	PDF	32	18	17	5	5
Nanos Research	September 28, 2008	PDF	35	14	18	4	4
Angus Reid Strategies	September 25, 2008	PDF	33	9	18	3	2
Angus Reid Strategies	September 20, 2008	PDF	32	8	19	4	5
Nanos Research	September 18, 2008	PDF	38	14	17	3	3
Nanos Research	September 15, 2008	PDF	36	14	18	3	3
Nanos Research	September 14, 2008	PDF	34	14	18	4	4
Angus Reid Strategies	September 12, 2008	PDF	36	9	16	4	3
Decima Research	September 8, 2008	PDF	43	22	-	-	-
Segma	September 6, 2008	PDF	42	15	16	4	4
EKOS Research Associates	September 4, 2008	HTML	32	12	19	3	5
Angus Reid Strategies	August 28, 2008	PDF	36	13	-	-	-
Nanos Research	August 27, 2008	PDF	36	15	17	5	4
Ipsos-Reid	February 14, 2008	HTML	41	25	18	6	-
Léger Marketing	February 10, 2008	HTML	32	15	18	-	-
Nanos Research	February 8, 2008	PDF	35	14	21	6	8
Nanos Research	January 3, 2008	HTML	42	12	16	5	4
Nanos Research	November 8, 2007	PDF	37	13	17	6	5
Segma	October 18, 2007	HTML	40	10	16	1	4
Angus Reid Strategies	October 17, 2007	PDF	30	10	-	-	-
Environics	October 17, 2007	HTML	37	12	19	5	4
Nanos Research	August 4, 2007	PDF	31	23	18	6	5
Angus Reid Strategies	July 16, 2007	HTML	33	14	-	-	-
Angus Reid Strategies	June 18, 2007	PDF	33	17	-	-	-
Nanos Research	April 5, 2007	HTML	42	17	16	7	4
Ipsos-Reid	February 19, 2007	HTML	46	29	-	-	

Sometimes the information is further broken down, as in this Strategic Counsel poll conducted from February 15 to February 18, 2007:

Leader	Clearest Vision for Canada	Most Decisive Leader	Most Charismatic
Stephen Harper	50	53	35
Stéphane Dion	22	19	20
Jack Layton	20	20	36
Gilles Duceppe	8	8	10

The Strategic Counsel also conducts occasional polls of the overall impression of the party leaders: favourable or not favourable (favourable percentage shown).

Date of Polling	Stephen Harper	Stéphane Dion	Jack Layton	Gilles Duceppe	Elizabeth May
January 13, 2008	58	39	55	62	56
January 14, 2007	54	59	59	63	58

== See also ==
- 2008 Canadian federal election
- Opinion polling in the Canadian federal election, 2006
- Opinion polling in the Canadian federal election, 2011
- Opinion polling in the Canadian federal election, 2015
