= 2014 Toronto mayoral election =

- October 27, 2014
- Opinion polls
- Turnout: 54.7% (▲4.1 pp)
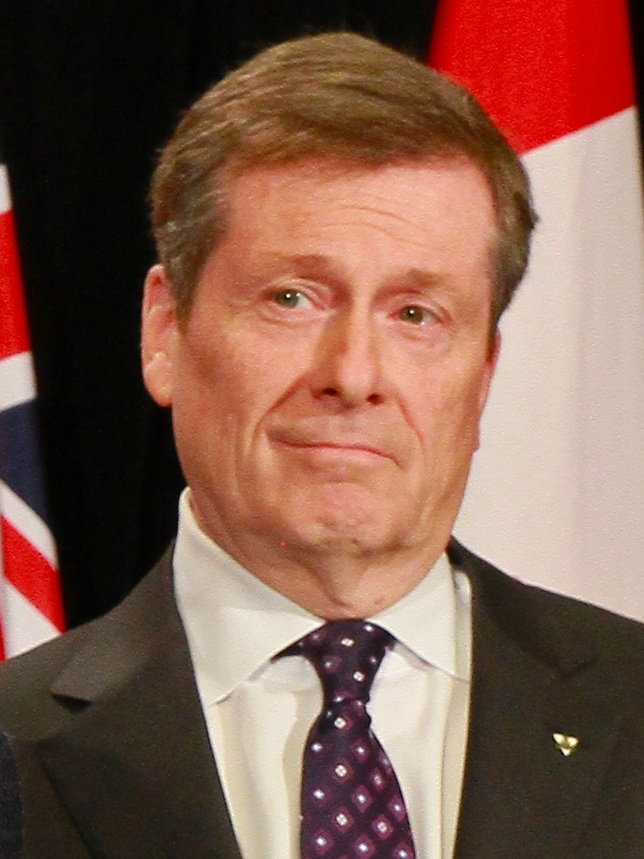

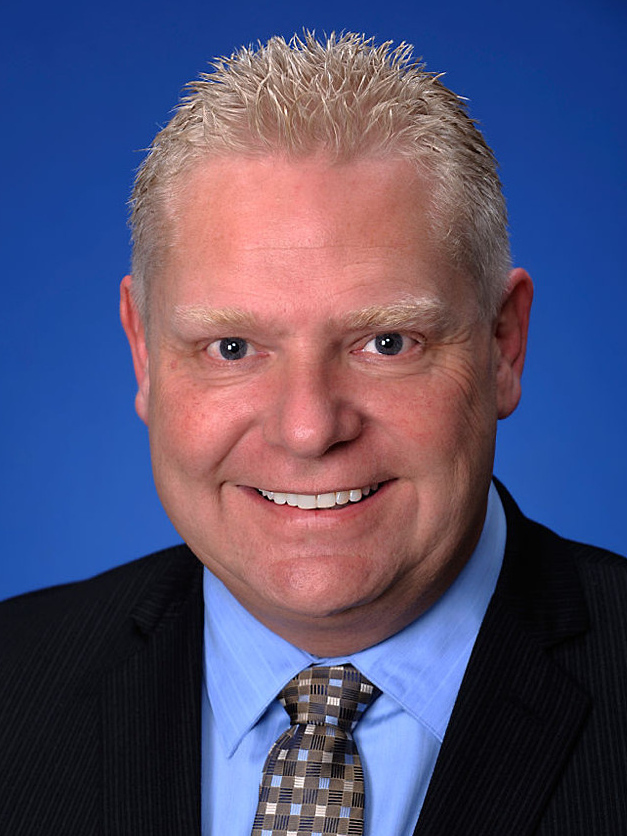

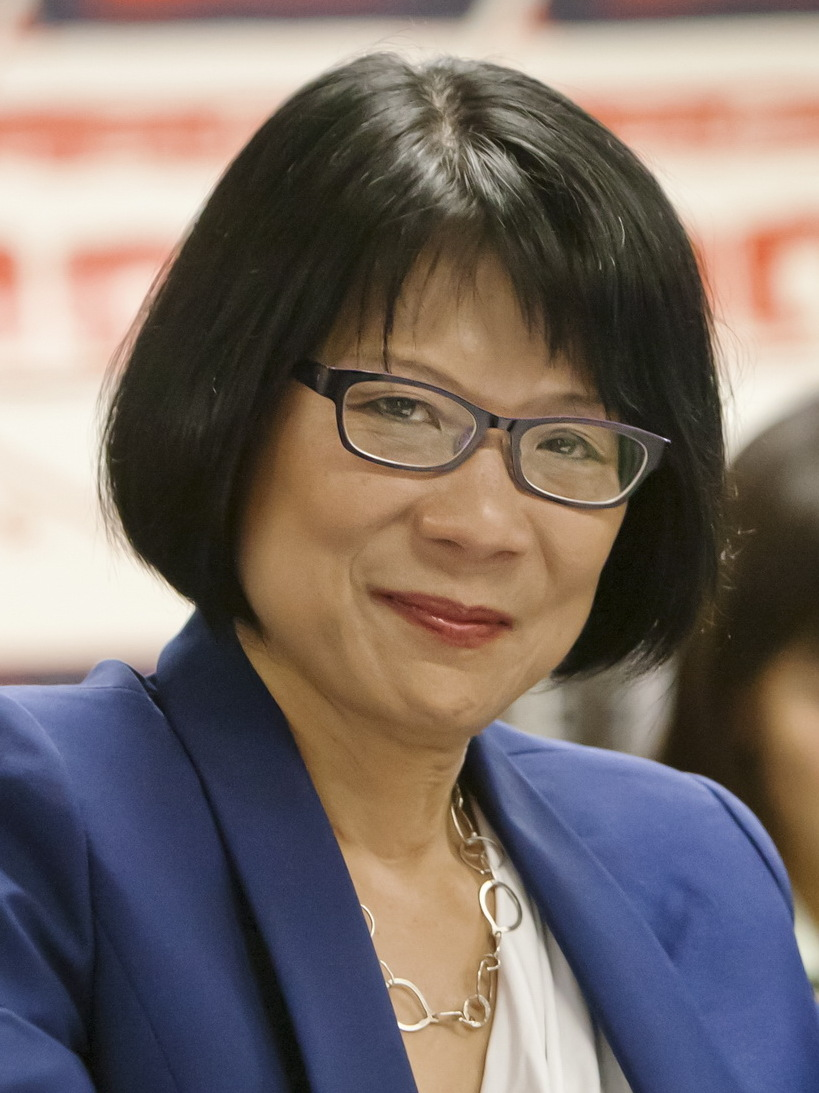
Candidate	John Tory	Doug Ford	Olivia Chow
Popular vote	394,775	330,610	226,879
Percentage	40.3%	33.7%	23.2%
- Results by ward

- Results by polling subdivision
Mayor before election
Rob Ford
Elected mayor
John Tory

A mayoral election was held on October 27, 2014. Incumbent Mayor Rob Ford initially ran for re-election, but dropped out after being diagnosed with a tumour - instead running for city council in Ward 2. Registration of candidates began on January 2, 2014, and ended September 12, 2014, at 2 pm.

The election was won by former Progressive Conservative Party of Ontario leader and 2003 mayoral runner-up John Tory, who defeated Ford's brother, city councillor Doug Ford, and former Trinity—Spadina MP Olivia Chow. More than 980,000 Torontonians cast ballots in this election – a record turnout of around 55 percent.

== Results ==
Official results from the City of Toronto as of October 28, 2014.

Candidate	Number of votes	% of popular vote
John Tory	394,775	40.28
Doug Ford	330,610	33.73
Olivia Chow	226,879	23.15
Ari Goldkind	3,912	0.40
Selina Chan	2,336	0.24
Rocco Di Paola	1,557	0.16
Don Andrews	1,012	0.10
Morgan Baskin	1,009	0.10
Ramnarine Tiwari	1,007	0.10
George Dedopoulos	941	0.10
Said Aly	800	0.08
Robb Johannes	756	0.08
Jonathan Glaister	747	0.08
Monowar Hossain	614	0.06
Mike Gallay	570	0.06
Sam Surendran	569	0.06
Michael Tramov	560	0.06
Kevin Clarke	547	0.06
Matthew Wong	491	0.05
Dewitt Lee	489	0.05
Hïmy Syed	465	0.05
Mark Cidade	453	0.05
Troy Young	411	0.04
Dave McKay	407	0.04
Michael Gordon	388	0.04
Christopher Ball	377	0.04
Ashok Sajnani	368	0.04
Matthew Crack	365	0.04
Frank Burgess	335	0.03
D!ONNE Renée	323	0.03
Michael Tasevski	319	0.03
Mohammad Okhovat	318	0.03
Chinh Huynh	312	0.03
Veerayya Kembhavimath	294	0.03
Jeff Billard	288	0.03
Pat Roberge	273	0.03
Lee Romanov	271	0.03
Radu Popescu	233	0.02
Jon Karsemeyer	232	0.02
Steven Lam	226	0.02
Jonathan Bliguin	207	0.02
Christina Van Eyck	203	0.02
Josh Rachlis	201	0.02
Carlie Ritch	194	0.02
Tibor Steinberger	188	0.02
Klim Khomenko	186	0.02
Leo Gambin	165	0.02
Daniel Walker	162	0.02
Ram Narula	156	0.02
Jamie Shannon	156	0.02
Michael Nicula	145	0.02
Gary McBean	135	0.01
Charles Huang	134	0.01
Russell Saunders	134	0.01
Diana Maxted	117	0.01
Jim Ruel	110	0.01
Erwin Sniedzins	104	0.01
Chai Kalevar	102	0.01
Matt Mernagh	102	0.01
Wally Schwauss	97	0.01
Donovan Searchwell	90	0.01
Ratan Wadhwa	73	0.01
René Viau	69	0.01
Oweka-Arac Ongwen	56	0.01
Jack Weenen	52	0.01
Total	980,177	100.00

== Candidates ==
At the close of nominations on September 12, 2014, 67 candidates were registered as per the City of Toronto website. Eighteen candidates had withdrawn including incumbent mayor Rob Ford. Two of the candidates who withdrew ended up re-registering and subsequently withdrawing again.

=== Registered candidates ===
Registered candidates
Name	Date Registered	Bio and Platform
Said Aly	January 2	
Don Andrews	January 2	Andrews is a perennial candidate and white supremacist, the leader of the neo-Nazi Nationalist Party of Canada.
Christopher Ball	January 2	
Morgan Baskin	February 28	Baskin is a high-school student. She says she thinks she can win by bringing a new voice to municipal politics and vowing to end the divisive politics she says has plagued the city for far too long.
Jeff Billard	January 3	
Jonathan Bliguin	March 26	
Frank Burgess	May 29	
Selina Chan	April 28	Chan would like to legalize, regulate and tax marijuana and prostitution in cooperation with provincial and federal authorities, to reduce taxes elsewhere.
Olivia Chow	March 12	Chow was the New Democratic Member of Parliament for Trinity—Spadina from 2006 until March 2014 when she resigned to enter the mayoral race. She had been a Metro Toronto Councillor and then a Toronto City Councillor from 1991 to 2005.
Mark Cidade	January 2	Cidade registered for the 2010 campaign, but withdrew due to undisclosed health reasons.
Kevin Clarke	May 9	Perennial candidate and leader of the People's Political Party of Ontario.
Matthew Crack	June 26	
George Dedopoulos	January 3	
Rocco Di Paola	February 25	
Doug Ford	September 12	City councillor for Ward 2. Entered the race following his brother's withdrawal.
Mike Gallay	May 26	
Leo Gambin	February 19	
Jonathan Glaister	April 10	
Ari Goldkind	March 17	Goldkind is a criminal lawyer. He is advocating a toll on the Don Valley Parkway and higher property taxes in order to pay for subway expansion.
Michael Gordon	April 4	
Monowar Hossain	January 2	Campaigned for the Toronto District School Board in 2000 and for Mayor of Toronto in 2003, 2006 and 2010. He moved to Canada from India in 1983 due to what he describes as "political issues". He trained as a lawyer, later worked as a security officer, and was studying to be an investment adviser in 2003. Hossain's first mayoral campaign was highlighted by a promise to provide food and housing for Toronto's unemployed to bring them into the workforce. In 2006, he described himself as the "Dealienation Advocate" and said that he would rescue people from "traps" like psychologists and laboratory experimentation.
Charles Huang	January 2	
Chinh Huynh	January 2	
Robb Johannes	January 6	Johannes is a Toronto-based musician and founding member of the band Paint.
Chai Kalevar	August 8	
Jon Karsemeyer	February 14	
Klim Khomenko	May 1	
Steven Lam	June 23	
Dewitt Lee	January 6	
Diana-De Maxted	January 2	Ran for mayor in 2000 and 2006. The founder of the Society Community Association Network (SCAN), which assists low income people and victims of crime and abuse. She campaigned for mayor in 2000, and for Toronto's 31st council ward in a 2001 by-election. When Toronto Police Chief Julian Fantino organized a "meet and greet" for Toronto's gay community in 2001, Maxted presented him with a pair of earrings. She wore a queen's gown, tiara and fairy wings to an all-candidates debate in 2006. Her platform will include advocacy for seniors and disability issues.
Veerayya Kembhavimath	September 12	
Gary McBean	July 25	
Dave McKay	March 25	Under the stage name Sketchy the Clown, Dave McKay has satirized incumbent mayor Rob Ford.
Matt Mernagh	January 2	Mernagh is an author, medical marijuana user and activist.
Ram Narula	August 15	
Michael Nicula	April 2	43-year-old Toronto businessman, founder and leader of the federally registered Party for Accountability, Competency and Transparency. Wants to bring his party's three values to City Hall.
Mohammad Okhovat	September 11	
Oweka-Arac Ongwen	August 28	
Radu Popescu	January 6	
Josh Rachlis	June 9	
D!ONNE Renée	August 15	North York resident, describes herself as an entrepreneur. Kicked out of three mayoral debates that she was not invited to.
Carlie Ritch	March 20	Also known as 'Mizz Barbie Bitch' Ritch is a dominatrix who wants to "whip Toronto into shape."
Pat Roberge	September 5	
Lee Romanov	June 14	
Jim Ruel	July 23	
Ashok Sajnani	March 26	A 70-year-old physician, Sajnani was born in India and is a resident of Rosedale, Toronto.
Russell Saunders	March 21	
Wally Schwauss	September 8	Withdrew on May 22; re-registered on July 4; withdrew again on August 19, and re-registered again on September 8.
Donovan Searchwell	August 1	
Jamie Shannon	June 25	
Erwin Sniedzins	April 9	
Tibor Steinberger	April 10	Steinberger ran for mayor in 2010, receiving 733 votes.
Sam Surendran	February 19	
Himy Syed	July 25	Syed was also a mayoral candidate in 2010. He was the founding editor of Torontowiki.org, former executive director of the Canadian Muslim Civil Liberties Association and described himself as an "Islamic banker". In 2010, Syed advocated "citizen's rights" as part of his platform.
Michael Tasevski	February 24	
Ramnarine Tiwari	February 14	
John Tory	February 24	Former leader of the Progressive Conservative Party of Ontario (2004-2009) and mayoral candidate in 2003; hosted a radio talk show on CFRB but resigned prior to registering as a candidate. Tory has released a campaign launch video in which he states that building a Downtown Relief Line is his top priority.
Michael Tramov	January 2	
Christina Van Eyck	March 17	
René Viau	September 12	
Ratan Wadhwa	May 26	
Daniel Walker	February 19	
Jack Weenen	January 10	
Matthew Wong	February 21	
Troy Young	January 8	

=== Withdrawn ===
- Glenn Boque – withdrew on September 12
- James Dalzell – withdrew on August 7
- Ryan Doherty – withdrew on August 27
- Ryan Emond – withdrew on August 22
- Rob Ford – the incumbent mayor withdrew on September 12 after being hospitalized with an abdominal tumour and registered to run for city councillor in Ward 2. He endorsed his brother Doug Ford for mayor.
- James French – withdrew on September 11
- Norm Gardner – former city councillor and Toronto Police Services chair, withdrew on September 4
- Happy Happy – withdrew on April 16; re-registered on June 12 and then withdrew again on September 12
- Greg Isaacs – withdrew on February 13
- Robin Lawrance – withdrew on June 30
- Jim McMillan – withdrew on June 30
- Waldemar (Wally) Schwauss – withdrew on May 22; re-registered on July 4; withdrew again on August 19, and re-registered again on September 8.
- Brent Smyth – withdrew on September 9
- David Soknacki – withdrew September 10, saying that his support wasn't growing fast enough and it wouldn't be fair to continue asking volunteers to run an unsuccessful campaign
- Karen Stintz – Ward 16 city councillor and former TTC chair withdrew on August 21 without endorsing another candidate.
- Sarah Thomson – withdrew on September 9 and registered to run for city councillor in Ward 20.
- Richard Underhill – withdrew on September 12 and endorsed Olivia Chow

=== Declined to run ===
- Margaret Atwood, a Canadian author. Member of the Green Party. Got into an altercation with Rob Ford in 2011–2012 over closings of several libraries. Stated she's "not running for mayor yet" and later said she would not run.
- Nikki Benz, adult film performer raised in Etobicoke. Announced that she intended to register on National Masturbation Day, May 28, however her expired Ontario driver's licence was not accepted as proof of address and her registration could not be processed.
- Shelley Carroll – Councillor for Ward 33 Don Valley East (2003–present), former Chair of the Budget Committee (2006–2010) and former Toronto District School Board trustee (2000–2003). Carroll registered her candidacy for re-election as Councillor for Ward 33 on February 21, 2014.
- Angela Kennedy, Toronto Catholic School Board Trustee for Ward 11 (2000–present), and former chair of the Board (2009–2010). Stated that she will not run for mayor, as she instead will be seeking the provincial seat of Don Valley East.
- Sheldon Levy, President and Vice Chancellor of Ryerson University (now Toronto Metropolitan University) since 2005, who sparked interest from many when announcing that he was stepping down from that position, after 10 years, in 2015. He consistently denied the rumour that he was running for mayor. Toronto Life magazine calls Levy "The Best Mayor Toronto Never Had".
- Denzil Minnan-Wong – Councillor for Ward 34 Don Valley East; first elected to Toronto City Council in 1997. Chair of the Public Works and Infrastructure Committee, a member of the Executive Committee and a supporter of the Progressive Conservative Party of Ontario. Was rumoured to be considering running for mayor; registered to run for his council position on April 24, 2014.
- Bob Rae, former MP for Toronto Centre (2008–2013), interim leader of the Liberal Party of Canada (2011–2013), and Premier of Ontario (1990–1995), ruled out running for mayor of Toronto when he announced his resignation as an MP on June 19, 2013.
- George Smitherman, former MPP for Toronto Centre (1999–2010), Deputy Premier of Ontario (2007–2010), and 2010 mayoral candidate. Endorsed Olivia Chow.
- Adam Vaughan – Councillor for Ward 20 Trinity—Spadina (2006–2014) and former Citytv/CP24 journalist. Instead, ran and was elected to the House of Commons of Canada in the Trinity—Spadina federal by-election.

== Issues ==
According to Nanos Research opinion poll conducted in July 2014 during the election campaign, the main issues concerning the voters were: public transit, high property taxes, jobs and the local economy and traffic.

=== Public transit ===
Chow's transit strategy focused on buses under the slogan of "Better bus service. Now." Some of the details included "more comfort and dignity" to bus commuters and adding 10% capacity during peak periods. Rob Ford's plan revolved around subway expansion, building 32 km of subway at an estimated cost of $9 billion. Doug Ford's policy mirrors mayor's pro-subway agenda. Tory presented his SmartTrack plan for transit – a 53-kilometre, 22-stop network that would run on existing commuter rail tracks.

=== Property taxes ===
Chow proposed a 1% hike on the levy charged to properties sold for over $2 million. Rob Ford promised to keep property taxes "well below" the rate of inflation. Tory pledged to keep property-tax increases within the rate of inflation.

=== Jobs and economy ===
Chow plans to boost economic opportunities by making Toronto the main trading hub for the Chinese currency in North America and Tory considers the mayor's job to "be the principal sales person and ambassador for the city".

== Debates ==
List of Debates
Date	Hosted by	Participants	Moderator	Ref
February 5	Campus student union of University of Toronto Scarborough campus	R. Ford, Gore, Johannes, Soknacki, and Underhill	Vice-president of the student union	
March 26	Hosted and televised by CityNews	Chow, R. Ford, Soknacki, Stintz and Tory	Gord Martineau	
March 27	Ted Rogers School of Management at Ryerson University	R. Ford, Soknacki, Stintz and Tory	Ralph Lean	
May 27	National Ethnic Press and Media Council of Canada	Baskin, Chow, Lee, Nicula, Sniedzins, Soknacki, Stintz, Thompson and Tory	Tony Ruprecht	
June 3	Humber College	Chow, Soknacki, Stintz and Tory	Sean Mallen	
July 15	Canadian Tamil Congress	Chow, R. Ford, Soknacki, Stintz and Tory	Chris Selley	
July 28	Parkview Hills Community Association of East York	Chow, R. Ford, Soknacki, Stintz and Tory		
August 21	Heritage Toronto at the Cathedral Centre	Chow, Soknacki and Tory		
August 29	The Diversity Advancement Network at the Novotel hotel in North York	Chow, R. Ford, Lee, Renée, Soknacki and Tory		
September 4	Toronto Region Board of Trade and The Globe and Mail	Chow, R. Ford, Soknacki and Tory		
September 9	National Congress of Italian-Canadians at a seniors' facility in North York	Chow, R. Ford and Tory		
September 12	Ontario Home Builders’ Association at the Westin Prince Hotel	Chow and Tory		
September 17	The National Club	Chow and Tory		
September 23	York Memorial Collegiate Institute	Chow, D. Ford and Tory		
September 26	The Empire Club	Chow and Tory		
September 29	ArtsVote at TIFF Bell Lightbox	Baskin, Chow, D. Ford, Goldkind and Tory		
October 1	Joseph J. Piccininni community centre in Corso Italia	Chow, D. Ford, Goldkind and Tory		
October 5	UJA Federation of Greater Toronto and the Centre for Israel and Jewish Affairs at Tanenbaum Community Hebrew Academy of Toronto	Chow, D. Ford, Goldkind and Tory		
October 8	Regent Park	Chow, Goldkind and Tory		
October 8	George Brown College	Chow, D. Ford and Tory		
October 14	Newstalk 1010	Chow, D. Ford and Tory		
October 16	CBC	Chow, D. Ford and Tory	Matt Galloway	

== Opinion polls ==
Graphical Summary

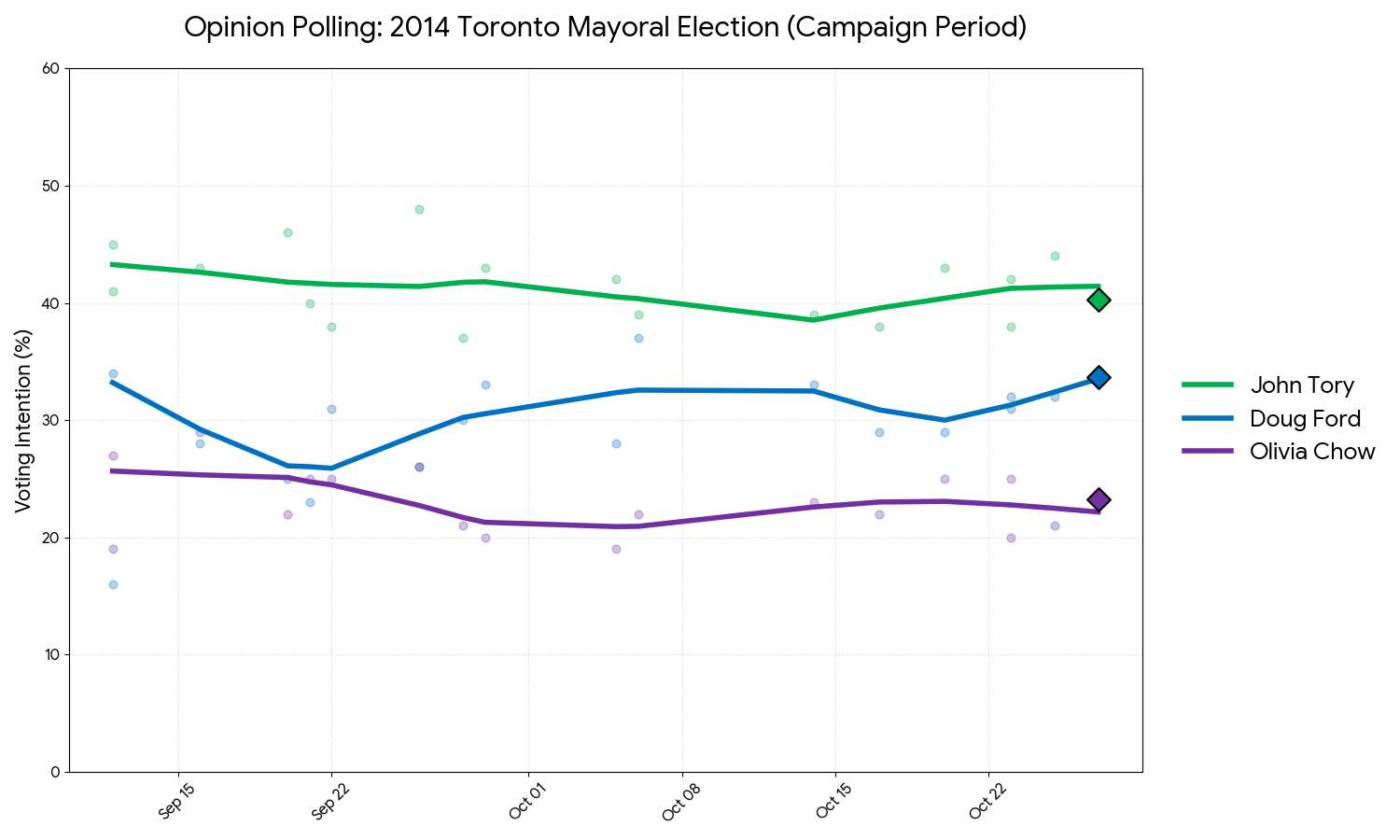
Opinion Polling for the 2014 Toronto Mayoral Election

Polling firm	Last date of polling	Link	Chow	D. Ford	Tory	Other	Don't know/ Wouldn't vote
Forum Research	October 25, 2014	PDF	21	32	44	3	—
Ipsos-Reid	October 23, 2014	PDF	25	31	42	—	—
Mainstreet Technologies	October 23, 2014	Scribd	20	32	38	3	7
Mainstreet Technologies	October 23, 2014	Scribd	22	34	42	3	—
Forum Research	October 20, 2014	PDF	25	29	43	3	—
Mainstreet Technologies	October 17, 2014	Scribd	22	29	38	3	8
Mainstreet Technologies	October 17, 2014	Scribd	24	32	43	3	—
Forum Research	October 14, 2014	PDF	23	33	39	4	—
Forum Research	October 6, 2014	PDF	22	37	39	2	—
Mainstreet Technologies	October 5, 2014	Scribd	19	28	42	—	11
Mainstreet Technologies	October 5, 2014	Scribd	22	31	47	—	—
Forum Research	September 29, 2014	PDF	20	33	43	3	—
Mainstreet Technologies	September 28, 2014	Scribd	21	30	37	—	12
Mainstreet Technologies	September 28, 2014	Scribd	24	34	42	—	—
Ipsos-Reid	September 26, 2014	PDF	26	26	48	—	—
Forum Research	September 22, 2014	PDF	25	31	38	1	4
Forum Research	September 22, 2014	PDF	24	30	38	4 (Goldkind 3)	4
Mainstreet Technologies	September 21, 2014	Scribd	25	23	40	—	11
Mainstreet Technologies	September 21, 2014	Scribd	28	26	46	—	—
Nanos Research	September 20, 2014	PDF	22	25	46	—	8
Nanos Research	September 20, 2014	PDF	24	27	49	—	—
Ipsos-Reid	September 16, 2014	PDF	29	28	43	—	—
Mainstreet Technologies	September 12, 2014	PDF	27	16	45	—	13
Mainstreet Technologies	September 12, 2014	PDF	30	18	51	—	—
Forum Research	September 12, 2014	PDF	19	34	41	3	3

Opinion polls prior to registration deadline
Polling firm	Last date of polling	Link	Chow	R. Ford	Soknacki	Stintz	Tory	Other	Don't know/ Wouldn't vote
Forum Research	September 8, 2014	PDF	—	30	—	—	57	9	4
Forum Research	September 8, 2014	PDF	24	30	—	—	41	2	3
Forum Research	September 8, 2014	PDF	21	28	6	—	40	1	4
Nanos Research	August 31, 2014	PDF	26	28	3	—	42	Thomson 1	—
Nanos Research	August 31, 2014	PDF	21	23	3	—	34	Thomson 1	17
Forum Research	August 26, 2014	PDF	26	31	—	—	36	—	7
Forum Research	August 26, 2014	PDF	23	31	4	—	34	—	7
Forum Research	August 6, 2014	PDF	28	30	—	—	38	—	4
Forum Research	August 6, 2014	PDF	25	27	5	4	35	—	4
Maple Leaf Strategies	July 30, 2014	PDF	31	27	4	4	35	—	—
Maple Leaf Strategies	July 30, 2014	PDF	26	23	3	3	30	—	14
Forum Research	July 21, 2014	PDF	35	27	—	—	32	—	3
Forum Research	July 21, 2014	PDF	29	27	5	5	28	—	4
Nanos Research	July 5, 2014	PDF	33	22	1	4	39	Thomson 2	—
Forum Research	July 2, 2014	PDF	36	26	4	3	27	—	4
Forum Research	July 2, 2014	PDF	36	—	4	4	38	—	18
Forum Research	July 2, 2014	PDF	38	28	—	—	30	—	4
Forum Research	July 2, 2014	PDF	40	—	—	—	42	—	18
Forum Research	June 23, 2014	PDF	34	27	6	3	24	—	6
Forum Research	June 23, 2014	PDF	36	—	8	5	34	—	17
Forum Research	June 23, 2014	PDF	37	28	—	—	29	—	6
Forum Research	June 23, 2014	PDF	42	—	—	—	40	—	17
Forum Research	May 21, 2014	PDF	36	24	3	3	27	—	6
Forum Research	May 21, 2014	PDF	37	—	4	4	26	D. Ford 20	8
Forum Research	May 21, 2014	PDF	39	—	6	4	36	—	15
Forum Research	May 21, 2014	PDF	40	—	5	4	33	Kelly 4	15
Forum Research	May 21, 2014	PDF	36	27	—	—	31	—	6
Forum Research	May 21, 2014	PDF	40	—	—	—	31	D. Ford 21	7
Forum Research	May 1, 2014	PDF	40	25	—	—	29	—	7
Forum Research	May 1, 2014	PDF	34	—	6	6	32	—	22
Forum Research	May 1, 2014	PDF	33	22	5	6	27	—	7
Forum Research	April 14, 2014	HTML	34	27	4	6	24	—	5
Forum Research	April 14, 2014	HTML	36	30	—	—	29	—	5
Forum Research	April 14, 2014	HTML	38	—	5	5	31	—	21
Forum Research	March 27, 2014	PDF	33	32	4	5	21	—	5
Forum Research	March 27, 2014	PDF	34	—	5	7	32	—	22
Forum Research	March 13, 2014	HTML	36	28	2	5	22	—	—
Forum Research	March 13, 2014	HTML	38	28	—	—	25	—	—
Forum Research	February 24, 2014	HTML	31	31	2	6	27	—	—
Forum Research	February 24, 2014	HTML	—	33	5	15	39	—	—
Forum Research	February 24, 2014	HTML	32	32	—	—	33	—	—
Forum Research	February 9, 2014	HTML	35	30	3	6	22	—	—
Forum Research	February 9, 2014	HTML	—	35	16	35	—	—	—
Forum Research	January 22, 2014	PDF	31	30	4	7	24	—	4
Forum Research	January 6, 2014	PDF	30	35	3	5	22	—	5
Forum Research	November 24, 2013	HTML	34	31	3	7	20	Minnan-Wong 4	2
Forum Research	November 24, 2013	HTML	34	31	4	7	22	—	3
Forum Research	November 24, 2013	HTML	—	35	13	40	—	—	12
Ipsos-Reid	November 12, 2013	PDF	—	33	14	52	—	—	—
Ipsos-Reid	November 12, 2013	PDF	—	22	7	30	41	—	—
Ipsos-Reid	November 12, 2013	PDF	44	28	7	22	—	—	—
Ipsos-Reid	November 12, 2013	PDF	36	20	3	13	28	—	—
Forum Research	November 4, 2013	PDF	—	33	8	38	—	—	21
Forum Research	November 4, 2013	PDF	39	29	6	16	—	—	10
Forum Research	November 4, 2013	PDF	—	29	4	22	31	—	14
Forum Research	November 4, 2013	PDF	32	26	2	10	25	—	7
Forum Research	August 29, 2013	PDF	57	33	—	—	—	—	10
Forum Research	August 29, 2013	PDF	—	33	—	—	50	—	17
Forum Research	August 29, 2013	PDF	—	40	—	44	—	—	16
Forum Research	August 29, 2013	PDF	—	39	—	—	—	Minnan-Wong 36	25
Forum Research	August 29, 2013	PDF	39	27	—	5	24	—	4
Forum Research	May 13, 2013	PDF	57	36	—	—	—	—	—
Forum Research	May 13, 2013	PDF	34	35	—	11	—	Vaughan 13	—
Forum Research	May 13, 2013	PDF	—	33	—	—	50	—	—
Forum Research	May 13, 2013	PDF	44	27	—	—	25	—	—
Forum Research	March 21, 2013	PDF	60	33	—	—	—	—	—
Forum Research	March 21, 2013	PDF	43	32	—	—	—	Vaughan 13; Thomson 7	—
Forum Research	March 21, 2013	PDF	47	32	—	—	—	Carrol 8 Thomson 6	—
Forum Research	January 25, 2013	PDF	—	36	—	—	48	—	—
Forum Research	January 25, 2013	PDF	52	40	—	—	—	—	—
Forum Research	January 25, 2013	PDF	—	40	—	49	—	—	—
Forum Research	January 25, 2013	PDF	—	45	—	—	—	Vaughan 43	—
2010 Election	October 25, 2010	HTML	—	47.11	—	—	—	52.89	—

== Endorsements ==
Some of the candidates have been endorsed by the following prominent persons and media outlets:

	Chow	D. Ford	Tory
Toronto Mayor and City Councillors	Joe Mihevc; Gord Perks; Sarah Doucette; Mike Layton; Paula Fletcher; Janet Davis; Pam McConnell	Mayor Rob Ford; Giorgio Mammoliti	John Filion; Jaye Robinson; Chin Lee; Gloria Lindsay Luby; James Maloney; Denzil Minnan-Wong
Media	Torontoist; Now		The Globe and Mail; Toronto Sun; Toronto Star; National Post
Other	Jon Stewart; Deepa Mehta; George Smitherman; Hossein Khosrow Ali Vaziri (aka The Iron Sheik); Toronto & York Region Labour Council; Frances Lankin; MP Elizabeth May, Green Party of Canada leader; Senator Nancy Ruth; Judy Rebick; Michele Landsberg; Naomi Klein; Steve Munro, transit advocate; CUPE Local 416; Unifor; The Elementary Teachers of Toronto	Former MP John Nunziata; Mike Strobel	Charles “Spider” Jones; MPP Brad Duguid; Gordon Chong; Liberal MPP David Zimmer; Conservative MP Bernard Trottier; Liberal MPP Peter Milczyn; Liberal MP Judy Sgro; Liberal MP Arnold Chan; Liberal MP John McKay; Conservative MP and Transport Minister Lisa Raitt; Former Ontario NDP MPP and cabinet minister Zanana Akande
