= Frank Graves (pollster) =

Canadian pollster (born 1952)

- Born: Francis Louis Graves; 1952 (age 73–74)
- Education: Carleton University
- Occupation: Pollster
- Years active: 1980–present
- Organization: Ekos Research Associates

Frank Graves is a Canadian author and applied social researcher. He is the founder and president of Ekos Research Associates.

== Education ==
Graves received a Bachelor of Arts in social anthropology from Carleton University in 1976 and a Master of Arts in sociology from Carleton University in 1977. In 1980, he quit his doctoral studies in sociology and founded Ekos Research Associates using $5,000 he borrowed from his father.

== Career ==
Graves is a contract instructor with the Department of Sociology and Anthropology at Carleton University and serves on the advisory board at Carleton's Sprott School of Business.

== Controversies ==
In April 2010, Graves was criticised for making disparaging remarks against the Conservative Party, such as "If the cranky old men in Alberta don't like it, too bad. Go south and vote for Palin." As he provided polling services to the Canadian Broadcasting Company, a review was carried out, which concluded the matter had been dealt with. Graves later apologized for "incendiary" comments and denied anti-Conservative bias in his polling.

== Awards and recognition ==
In 2024, Graves was awarded an honorary Doctor of Laws from Carleton University.

== Bibliography ==
- Northern Populism: Causes and Consequences of the New Ordered Outlook, University of Calgary School of Public Policy SPP Research Papers, Vol. 13:15 (June 2020), University of Calgary.
- Redesigning Work: A Blueprint for Canada’s Future Well-Being and Prosperity. Graham Lowe and Frank Graves. Canada: Rotman/UTP Publishing, 2016. Print.
- Understanding the New Public Outlook on the Economy and Middle-Class Decline, University of Calgary School of Public Policy SPP Research Papers, Vol. 9:6 (February 2016), University of Calgary.
- The Reinstatement of Progressive Canada, Institute for Research on Public Policy, 11 January 2016
- "Being Canadian Today: Images in a Fractured Mirror", Canada: the State of the Federation 2012, Loleen Berdahl et al. McGill-Queen’s University Press, 2015. Print.
- "Canadian Public Opinion on Taxes", Tax is Not a Four-Letter Word: A Different Take on Taxes in Canada, Alex Himelfarb et al. Waterloo, ON: Wilfrid Laurier University Press, 4 October 2013. Print.
- "Canada-US in Flux: Toward a Big North American Idea", In Canada-U.S. Project (2009): 2-8.
- North America: Mosaic, Community, or Fortress? Published in NORTEAMÉRICA revista académia Year 2, number 2, July–December 2007
- The Shifting Public Outlook on Risk and Security, One Issue, Two Voices (Volume 4 - Threat Perceptions in the United States and Canada), Joint Publication of the Canada Institute and the Woodrow Wilson International Centre for Scholars, October 2005
- Polling on Trial: Lessons from the 2004 Canadian Election, Imprints, December 2004.
- Rethinking Government as if People Mattered: From Reaganomics to "Humanomics". In Leslie A. Pal, ed. How Ottawa Spends 1999-2000: Shape-Shifting: Canadian Governance Toward the 21st Century. Toronto: Oxford University Press, 1999.
- Identity and National Attachment in Contemporary Canada, with Tim Dugas and Patrick Beauchamp. In Harvey Lazar and Tom McIntosh, eds. Canada: The State of the Federation 1998-99 (Vol. 13: How Canadians Connect). Kingston: Institute of Intergovernmental Relations, 1999.
- Canadians and their Public Institutions. Frank L. Graves and Paul Reed. Optimum: The Journal of Public Sector Management, 28:4 (1999), pp. 1–8
- La question du chômage et le caractère distinctif de l’électorat québécois au scrutin fédéral de 1993, with BenoÎt Gauthier and François-Pierre Gingras, Revue québécoise de science politique, no 27, Spring 1996
- The Role of Economics in Evaluating Public Investment in the Arts in Paying for the Arts, published by The Association for Cultural Economics, Editors H.H. Chartrand, W.S. Hendron, and H. Horowitz. Akron, Ohio, 1987
- Towards Practical Rigour: Methodological and Strategic Considerations for Program Evaluation, in Optimum, Bureau of Management Consulting, Vol. 15:4 (1984)
- Functional and Elective Illiteracy in Canada with B. Kinsley, Canadian Journal of Education, Vol. 8:4 (Autumn 1983), pp. 315–331
