= Spider Jones =

Canadian journalist, author and boxer (born 1946)

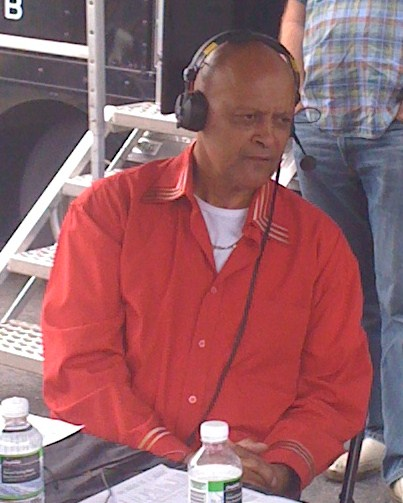
- Born: Charles Jones; April 20, 1946 (age 80); Windsor, Ontario
- Citizenship: Canadian
- Occupation: broadcaster/motivational speaker
- Years active: 1983 to present
- Employer: Spider Jones Motivational Services
- Known for: former amateur boxer
- Height: 6 ft 2 in (188 cm)
- Title: President/CEO
- Awards: Premier Award from the Prov. of Ont., for Outstanding Achievements & Contributions to the Community World Boxing Federation Ring Announcer of the Year The Canadian Crime Victim Award B'Nai Brith Award for Community Service Bob Marley Award for Education Dan McArthur Award for In-depth Investigative Reporting on Guns, Gangs and Crime

Charles "Spider" Jones (born April 20, 1943) is a Canadian journalist, author, and former amateur boxer. He is a former three-time Golden Glove Champion and was inducted into the Canadian Boxing Hall of Fame in 1996.

== Life and career ==
Jones formerly hosted a talk radio show on CFRB 1010 in Toronto.

In 1996, Jones was voted "Boxing Commentator and M.C. of the Year" by the Board of Governors of the World Boxing Federation. In 2020, he received the Order of Ontario award, and in 2023, he was honoured with the Black Business and Professional Association's Harry Jerome Lifetime Achievement Award.

== Books ==
- Out of the Darkness: The Spider Jones Story. ECW Press (November 2003). ISBN 1-55022-603-7
