= Environics =

Canadian public opinion research companies

The Environics brand encompasses several Canadian privately held companies - Environics Research, the Environics Institute for Survey Research, and Proof - that provide public opinion research and strategic communications services.

== Environics Research ==
Environics
- Type: Privately held corporation
- Founded: Toronto, Ontario, Canada (1970)
- Founder: Michael Adams
- Headquarters: Toronto, Ontario, Canada
- Key people: Barry Watson CEO
- Services: Research
- Website: www.environics.ca

Environics Research is a Canadian-owned company that provides consulting and market research services for businesses, governments, and non-profit organizations. It offers research, consulting, and communications services. Its areas of market research include Financial Services, Health & Wellness, Corporate & Public Affairs, and Market Strategy.

Environics studies motivations, attitudes, and behaviours in Canada and the United States. Since 1983, the company has conducted annual surveys of Social Values, interviewing more than 5,000 Canadians and 5,000 Americans each year. These surveys allow researchers to track changes in social values longitudinally.

The company was founded in 1970, its founding president was Michael Adams, and its CEO was Barry Watson. The company's opinion polls results have been used by Canadian news media.

== Proof (formerly Environics Communications) ==
Proof
- Type: Privately held company
- Founded: 1994
- Founder: Bruce MacLellan, CEO
- Headquarters: Toronto, Ontario, Canada
- Services: Integrated Communications Agency
- Website: www.getproof.com

Proof Strategies is a Canadian integrated marketing communications firm, established in 1994 by founder and current CEO Bruce MacLellan. The company's services include public relations, brand strategy and planning, creative & video, government relations, influencer marketing, and paid media, among others. In March 2017, the company released the second annual CanTrust Index, which measured Canadians' trust across a wide range of topics, industries, and sectors.

In March 2018, Environics Communications rebranded as Proof Inc. Proof released the third annual CanTrust Index.

== Environics Institute ==
Environics Institute
- Type: Privately held corporation
- Founded: Toronto, Ontario, Canada (2006)
- Founder: Michael Adams
- Headquarters: Toronto, Ontario, Canada
- Key people: Michael Adams CEO, Andrew Parkin Executive Director,
- Services: Non-profit organization, Research
- Website: www.environicsinstitute.org

The Environics Institute for Survey Research, established in 2006 by Michael Adams, is a non-profit organization that conducts in-depth public opinion and social research on Canadian issues.

Its focus areas include diversity, Indigenous reconciliation, governance, and socio-economic change.

The Institute tracks trends over time and collaborates with public, private, and non-profit sectors.
