= Forum Research =

Canadian polling firm

- Type: Private
- Industry: Market research and analysis
- Founded: 1993
- Founder: Lorne Bozinoff
- Headquarters: Toronto, Ontario, Canada
- Number of locations: 9 branch offices
- Key people: Lorne Bozinoff (President & CEO)
- Services: Enterprise feedback management Customer experience Market and consumer research Retail and branch research Consulting services
- Number of employees: 300
- Subsidiaries: The Forum Poll
- Website: www.forumresearch.com

Forum Research is a Canadian market research and polling firm founded in 1993 by Lorne Bozinoff. Forum Research Inc. is headquartered in Toronto, Ontario, and has offices throughout Canada (Edmonton, Toronto, and Vancouver) and around the world (Houston, Buenos Aires, Dubai, Mumbai, and Shanghai).

== Political polling ==
Forum conducts regular polls on municipal, provincial and federal politics for major Canadian news outlets, including the Toronto Star, National Post and Sun newspaper chain. The firm conducted extensive polls during the 2010 Toronto mayoral election and the 2011 Canadian federal election, in which it was the first to predict through polling the defeat of the Liberal Party in Toronto and Montreal to the New Democratic Party. Forum accurately stated the NDP surge in the 2011 Canadian federal elections, which was later validated by the official election results.

Forum also conducts surveys on other social issues, including recent surveys on gun control, 'gay-centric' schools and abortion.

== Business specialization ==
Forum Research specializes in political polling and customer satisfaction research. Some of the firm's research tools include small and large-scale telephone, interactive telephone, and online polling, focus groups, one-on-one interviews, mail, door-to-door, intercept and personal surveys.

== Affiliates ==
- Access Research
- Service Metrics
- RDDNet
