= Decima Research =

Public opinion and market research company

Decima Research is a public opinion and market research company in Canada. In 2007, it became a subsidiary of Harris Insights & Analytics. The Roper Center at Cornell University recognizes it as a "Historically Contributing Data Provider".

== History ==
Allan Gregg, the head of the firm, left Decima in 1994 and went into semi-retirement following the electoral disaster for the Progressive Conservatives in the 1993 election. Decima conducts polling of the federal political scene in Canada on a regular basis, whether or not an election campaign is in progress.

Decima Research's field work was conducted by Opinion Search, a call centre.
