= Ekos Research Associates =

Canadian research company

Ekos Research Associates Inc.

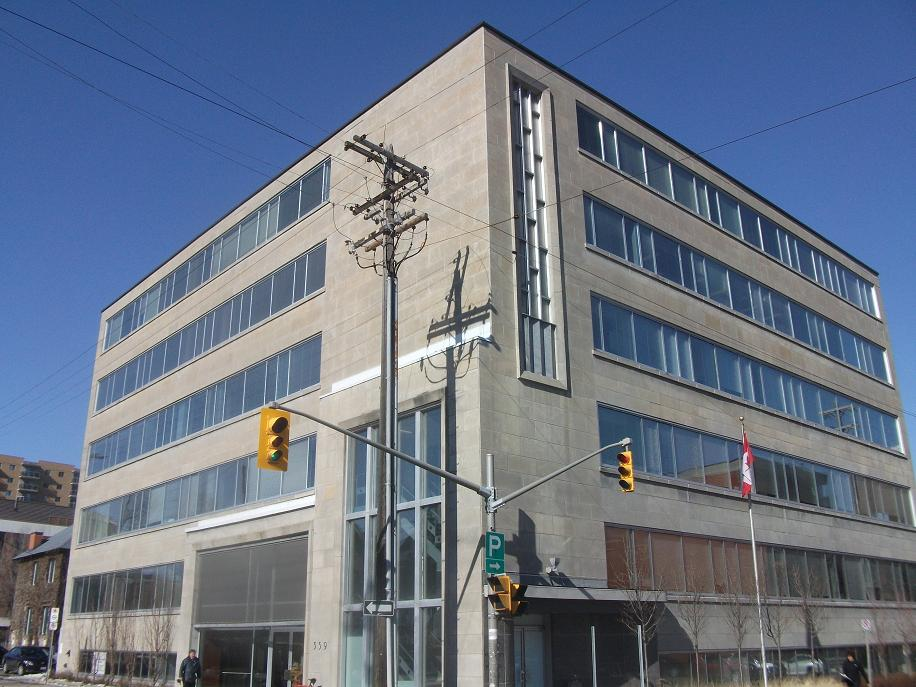
- Ekos Research headquarters, Ottawa, Canada
- Type: Private
- Industry: Public opinion research; Market research; Economic research
- Founded: 1980
- Founder: Frank Graves
- Headquarters: Ottawa, Canada
- Key people: Frank Graves (President)
- Website: www.ekos.com

Ekos Research Associates (commonly known as EKOS) is a Canadian public opinion research and consulting firm founded in 1980 by Frank Graves. The company specializes in public opinion research, market research, program evaluation, and economic research.

== History ==
EKOS Research Associates was established in 1980 by Frank Graves, who continues to serve as the firm's president and chief executive. The company's name is derived from the Greek word "oikos" (οἶκος), meaning "household" or "family".

Throughout the 1980s and 1990s, EKOS established itself as a major player in Canadian public opinion research, securing contracts with various federal government departments. By the early 2000s, the firm had expanded its services to include more comprehensive policy research and strategic consulting.

In 2009, EKOS began a partnership with CBC News to provide exclusive polling data, a relationship that continued intermittently for several years. The firm later established a similar data-sharing arrangement with iPolitics, an online political news outlet.

== Methodology ==
EKOS employs a variety of research methodologies, including traditional telephone surveys (using random digit dialing – RDD), interactive voice response (IVR) technology, and its proprietary hybrid online/telephone research panel, Probit.

EKOS utilizes IVR technology for political polling, which uses automated phone systems rather than live interviewers. This approach offers cost advantages and can reduce social desirability bias, though it may face challenges with response rates among certain demographics. In recent years, EKOS has emphasized its hybrid methodology (Probit), which combines random digit dialing telephone recruitment with online panel participation. This approach aims to provide exhaustive coverage of the population (Internet, landline, cell phone) using probability-based sampling. Mixed-mode methodologies are often employed in the polling industry to address challenges like declining response rates and potential demographic biases associated with single-mode approaches.

In 2018, EKOS introduced refinements to its methodology, including enhanced cell phone sampling and more sophisticated weighting techniques to better represent younger demographics and mobile-only households.

=== Advanced research methodologies ===
EKOS utilizes its Probit panel, described as a hybrid online/telephone research panel constructed using probability-based methods. Recruitment for the panel is conducted randomly via telephone (using random digit dialing for both landline and cell phones), and respondents participate either online or by phone. This hybrid approach aims to provide exhaustive coverage of the Canadian population and support margin of error estimates, unlike non-probability opt-in panels.

For data analysis, EKOS applies multi-variable iterative weighting procedures (such as Random Iterative Method or RIM weighting) to adjust its survey samples. These adjustments typically account for demographic variables including age, gender, region, and educational attainment to ensure the sample's composition reflects population benchmarks, often based on Census data. EKOS has noted that weighting by education can be appropriate when response rates appear correlated with this variable, though acknowledging the complexities involved in comparing survey samples to Census data on education due to measurement and coverage factors.

In its qualitative research, EKOS employs methods such as focus groups, key informant interviews, ethnographic research, and content analysis to gain deeper understanding of public attitudes and motivations. The available sources do not specify whether their content analysis techniques involve computational methods like natural language processing (NLP) or proprietary algorithms.

== Polling accuracy ==
EKOS's accuracy record has been subject to both academic analysis and public scrutiny, particularly following federal and provincial elections.

According to post-election analyses, EKOS's final polls in both the 2019 and 2021 Canadian federal elections were generally within the margin of error for major parties nationally. Some analyses noted a tendency among multiple pollsters, including EKOS, to underestimate Conservative support, particularly in Alberta during the 2019 election.

After the 2015 federal election, where many polling firms underestimated Liberal support, EKOS published a methodology paper detailing adjustments to their weighting procedures to better capture younger voters and mobile-only households.

Analyses from polling aggregator sites like 338Canada have noted that EKOS's provincial polling has shown more variance in accuracy, particularly in Alberta elections where polls historically underestimated conservative support.

Academic research has identified EKOS as having slight "house effects" that historically showed marginally higher Green Party support compared to election results.

== Services ==
EKOS offers a range of research and consulting services, including public opinion polling, policy research and analysis, program evaluation, market research, and economic research.

The firm conducts research across various sectors, including healthcare, national security, democratic institutions, immigration, and social policy.

== International work ==
While primarily focused on Canadian research, EKOS has developed several international research initiatives over the years.

The firm has conducted several cross-border studies comparing Canadian and American public opinion on issues like healthcare, immigration, and trade relations.

Frank Graves has participated in international security research networks, including collaborative work with NATO-affiliated research groups on public attitudes toward security threats and alliance relationships.

Government contract records show EKOS has undertaken evaluations of certain Global Affairs Canada international development programs, particularly in francophone Africa and Latin America.

== Notable research ==
EKOS has conducted numerous high-profile studies on Canadian public opinion, including:

=== Political polling ===
EKOS regularly releases voting intention polls during federal and provincial election campaigns. During the 2021 Canadian federal election, EKOS's final poll projected the Liberal Party would win the most seats, which aligned with the actual election outcome.

=== Social cohesion and polarization ===
Since 2019, EKOS has published research on growing polarization in Canadian society, particularly around issues of immigration, climate change, and economic outlook. This research has identified differing outlooks among voters, which has been cited as a framework for understanding contemporary political divisions in Canada.

=== Economic confidence ===
EKOS frequently tracks Canadian economic confidence, including public perceptions of personal financial situations, job security, and economic outlook.

=== COVID-19 research ===
During the COVID-19 pandemic, EKOS conducted extensive research on Canadians' attitudes toward public health measures, vaccine acceptance, and the economic impacts of the pandemic. This research was frequently cited by media outlets and government agencies.

=== Immigration attitudes ===
The firm has conducted research on Canadian attitudes toward immigration and multiculturalism, noting shifts in public opinion over time.

== Leadership ==
Frank Graves remains the president and founder of EKOS Research Associates. He frequently appears as a commentator in Canadian media discussing public opinion trends. Known for his outspoken commentary and analysis, Graves has been described as an influential figure who has helped shape the discourse around Canadian polling methodologies and public opinion research.

The senior leadership team includes experts in quantitative and qualitative research methodologies and policy analysis.

== Government contracts ==
EKOS has secured numerous contracts with the Government of Canada over the years. According to the federal government's proactive disclosure database, between 2017 and 2023, EKOS was awarded multiple public opinion research contracts from various departments, including Health Canada, Immigration, Refugees and Citizenship Canada, and the Privy Council Office.
