= Nanos Research =

Canadian company

Nanos Research (previously SES Research) is a Canadian public opinion and research company, that was established in 1987 by Nik Nanos.

For the 2004 Federal Election, the company launched a publicly available nightly tracking program, the first of its kind in Canadian election history.
