= Opinion polling for the 2018 Quebec general election =

This table provides a list of scientific, public opinion polls that were conducted from the 2014 Quebec general election leading up to the 2018 Quebec general election, which took place as scheduled on October 1, 2018.

Evolution of voting intentions during the 2018 Quebec general election campaign. Plot generated in R from data in the table below. Trendlines are local regressions, with polls weighted by proximity in time. 95% confidence ribbons represent uncertainty about the regressions, not the likelihood that actual election results would fall within the intervals.

Evolution of voting intentions during the pre-campaign period of the 2018 Quebec general election.

Polling firm	Last date of polling	Link	QLP	PQ	CAQ	QS	Other	Lead	Sample Size	Margin of Error	Method
2018 election	October 1, 2018	HTML	24.8	17.1	37.4	16.1	4.6	12.6	—N/a	—N/a	—N/a
Forum	September 30, 2018	PDF	28	20	33	17	2	5	—N/a	—N/a	IVR
Research Co.	September 30, 2018	HTML	30	18	33	16	3	3	625	3.9%	Online
Angus Reid Institute	September 30, 2018	PDF	25	18	32	20	5	7	635	4%	Online
Ipsos	September 28, 2018	PDF	31	18	32	16	3	1	1250	3.2%	Online/telephone
Mainstreet	September 27, 2018	HTML	29.0	19.5	31.5	16.3	3.6	2.5	1760	2.3%	IVR
Leger	September 27, 2018	PDF	30	19	32	17	2	2	1502	2.7%	Online
Ipsos	September 23, 2018	PDF	30	20	30	16	4	0	1250	3.2%	Online/telephone
Research Co.	September 22, 2018	HTML	30	19	32	16	3	2	601	4.0	Online
Third televised debate (in French, September 20, 2018)
Second televised debate (in English, September 17, 2018)
Leger	September 17, 2018	PDF	30	21	31	14	4	1	3017	1.78%	Online
CROP	September 17, 2018	PDF	37	16	30	14	3	7	1000	—N/a	Online
Forum	September 15, 2018	PDF	22	24	32	19	2	8	1274	3%	IVR
Mainstreet	September 15, 2018	HTML	28.6	21.5	29.1	17.1	3.6	0.5	1665	2.4%	IVR
First televised debate (in French, September 13, 2018)
Leger	September 10, 2018	PDF	29	21	35	11	4	6	1014	3.1%	Online
Mainstreet	September 7, 2018	HTML	27.2	21.1	32.2	15.7	3.8	5.0	2531	1.9%	IVR
Leger	August 28, 2018	PDF	32	19	37	8	4	5	1010	3.1%	Online
Election period officially begins (August 24, 2018)
Forum	August 23, 2018	PDF	22	21	42	13	2	20	965	3%	IVR
Ipsos	August 21, 2018	PDF	29	18	36	11	6	7	1501	2.9%	Online/Telephone
Mainstreet	August 20, 2018	PDF	25.6	17.7	32.1	13.9	10.7	6.5	1647	2.4%	IVR
CROP	August 20, 2018	PDF	36	15	38	10	2	2	1000	3.1%	Online
Leger	August 14, 2018	PDF	30	18	36	10	6	6	2488	2.0%	Online
Mainstreet	July 29, 2018	HTML	29.7	16.5	32.3	11.7	9.8	2.6	1320	2.7%	IVR
CROP	June 19, 2018	PDF	33	14	39	11	3	6	1002	3.1%	Online
Leger	June 10, 2018	PDF	28	19	37	9	7	9	3234	1.7%	Online
Leger	May 8, 2018	PDF	26	22	35	10	6	9	1018	3.1%	Online
Ipsos	May 2, 2018	HTML	32	20	35	8	5	3	2001	2.5%	Online
CROP	April 2018	PDF	35	16	35	12	2	0	1005	—N/a	Online
Mainstreet	April 9, 2018	HTML	29.7	16.2	30.1	12.0	12.0	0.4	1200	2.8%	IVR
Leger	April 8, 2018	PDF	29	21	34	9	7	5	1019	3.1%	Online
CROP	March 2018	PDF	35	14	37	12	2	2	1026	—N/a	Online
Mainstreet	March 1, 2018	HTML	27.8	19.8	32.0	10.8	9.6	4.2	1062	3.1%	IVR
Leger	March 1, 2018	PDF	26	22	37	9	7	11	993	3.1%	Online
Ipsos	February 4, 2018	HTML	30	23	34	8	6	4	1297	4.4%	Online/telephone
Leger	January 24, 2018	PDF	28	20	39	9	4	11	983	3.1%	Online
CROP	January 2018	PDF	36	18	34	9	3	2	1000	—N/a	Online
Mainstreet	January 6, 2018	HTML	31.4	18.1	31.6	14.9	4.0	0.2	965	3.1%	IVR
CROP	December 2017	PDF	36	14	38	10	2	2	1000	—N/a	Online
Mainstreet	December 8, 2017	PDF	29	24	31	15	2	2	1500	2.5%	Telephone
Leger	November 30, 2017	PDF	32	19	36	11	2	4	1010	3.1%	Online
CROP	November 2017	HTML	35	17	35	10	2	0	1000	—N/a	Online
Mainstreet	November 8, 2017	PDF	29	24	29	16	2	0	1500	2.5%	Telephone
Leger	October 25, 2017	PDF	29	20	34	12	5	5	1008	3.1%	Online
CROP	October 2017	HTML	42	13	31	11	2	11	1000	3%	Online
Ipsos	October 17, 2017	HTML	32	24	28	12	4	4	1659	3.3%	Online/Telephone
Mainstreet	October 11, 2017	PDF	29	26	26	16	2	3	1500	2.5%	Telephone
CROP	September 2017	PDF	33	22	29	13	2	4	1002	—N/a	Online
Mainstreet	September 14, 2017	HTML	30	26	26	18	0*	4	1501	2.5%	Telephone
Leger	August 24, 2017	PDF	32	22	28	12	6	4	1003	3.1%	Online
Mainstreet	August 10, 2017	HTML	31	24	28	17	0*	3	1501	2.5%	Telephone
Mainstreet	July 15, 2017	HTML	33	21	28	19	0*	5			
CROP	June 2017	PDF	38	21	25	13	3	13			
Leger	June 21, 2017	PDF	31	22	28	15	4	3			
Mainstreet	June 15, 2017	HTML	33	22	27	18	0*	6			
Leger	June 15, 2017	PDF	30	22	28	13	7	2			
CROP	May 2017	HTML	36	24	28	10	2	8			
Leger	May 18, 2017	PDF	32	23	26	13	6	6			
Mainstreet	May 12, 2017	HTML	31	24	32	14	0*	1			
CROP	April 2017	HTML	37	24	26	9	4	11			
Mainstreet	April 13, 2017	HTML	33	27	26	14	0*	6			
Mainstreet	March 30, 2017	HTML	39	26	23	12	0*	13			
Leger	March 16, 2017	PDF	34	25	22	14	5	9			
Mainstreet	March 13, 2017	HTML	34	31	27	8	0*	3			
Mainstreet	February 13, 2017	HTML	34	31	28	7	0*	3			
Leger	January 19, 2017	PDF	32	29	23	9	7	3			
Mainstreet	January 16, 2017	HTML	35	32	26	7	0*	3			
CROP	January 16, 2017	PDF	35	27	25	11	2	8			
Leger	December 15, 2016	PDF	30	30	26	10	4	0			
CROP	December 12, 2016	PDF	38	25	23	9	5	13			
CROP	November 21, 2016	PDF	36	24	26	11	3	10			
Leger	November 10, 2016	PDF	31	30	25	10	4	1			
CROP	October 17, 2016	PDF	37	30	22	9	2	7			
Leger	September 29, 2016	PDF	35	29	23	10	4	6			
CROP	September 19, 2016	PDF	37	27	26	9	1	10			
Leger	September 1, 2016	PDF	34	29	23	10	4	5			
CROP	August 15, 2016	HTML	35	25	25	12	4	10			
CROP	June 19, 2016	HTML	34	25	24	14	3	9			
Leger	June 8, 2016	PDF	32	30	24	10	4	2			
CROP	May 23, 2016	PDF	34	26	27	11	3	7			
Leger	May 5, 2016	PDF	35	30	21	10	4	5			
CROP	April 18, 2016	HTML	33	26	25	14	3	7			
Leger	March 22, 2016	PDF	33	30	22	10	6	3			
CROP	March 21, 2016	HTML	32	30	24	11	3	2			
CROP	February 15, 2016	PDF	36	31	18	12	3	5			
Leger	February 4, 2016	PDF	36	29	21	10	5	7			
CROP	January 18, 2016	PDF	35	27	19	16	3	8			
CROP	December 14, 2015	PDF	37	30	17	13	3	7			
Leger	November 19, 2015	PDF	35	32	20	10	2	3			
CROP	November 18, 2015	PDF	36	35	16	12	2	1			
CROP	October 18, 2015	PDF	36	33	16	12	3	3			
CROP	September 20, 2015	PDF	37	30	18	13	2	7			
CROP	August 17, 2015	PDF	33	29	23	13	2	4			
CROP	June 16, 2015	HTML	34	34	17	13	2	0			
Leger	June 11, 2015	PDF	36	32	20	10	2	4			
CROP	May 20, 2015	HTML	29	33	20	15	3	4			
Leger	May 17, 2015	PDF	32	34	20	10	3	2			
CROP	April 20, 2015	PDF	34	27	25	12	2	7			
Leger	April 9, 2015	PDF	37	28	21	10	4	9			
CROP	March 15, 2015	HTML	29	27	26	16	2	2			
CROP	February 15, 2015	HTML	37	26	22	11	3	11			
Leger	February 5, 2015	PDF	37	25	25	9	4	12			
CROP	January 19, 2015	PDF	35	26	23	13	4	9			
CROP	December 15, 2014	HTML	35	28	27	10	1	7			
Leger	December 11, 2014	PDF	34	26	26	11	3	8			
CROP	November 17, 2014	HTML	36	23	24	14	3	12			
Leger	November 13, 2014	PDF	36	26	26	10	2	10			
CROP	October 20, 2014	PDF	40	25	23	12	0	15			
Leger	September 25, 2014	PDF	38	21	28	10	3	10			
CROP	September 22, 2014	PDF	35	21	30	13	1	5			
Leger	August 25, 2014	PDF	41	22	23	10	4	18			
CROP	August 18, 2014	PDF	41	18	27	12	2	14			
Leger	June 18, 2014	PDF	40	20	27	9	4	13			
CROP	June 16, 2014	PDF	39	19	29	10	3	10			
Leger	June 5, 2014	PDF	39	20	29	9	3	10			
CROP	May 19, 2014	PDF	41	22	24	10	3	17			
Leger	May 8, 2014	PDF	40	19	27	11	3	13			
CROP	April 21, 2014	PDF	40	22	23	11	3	17			
2014 election	April 7, 2014	HTML	41.52	25.38	23.05	7.63	2.42	16.14			

== Mainstreet ==
"*" = Mainstreet does not mention "Other" nor any other party than the main four, but the total of the main four is 100%, (±1% because of sum of rounding errors). It is not known whether any other parties were allowed in the answer, or whether those answers were excluded, but it is highly unlikely that less than 0.5% of those polled by Mainstreet prefer a party other than the main four. |}

== Polling by language group ==
=== French ===
Voting intentions among French speakers

Timeline of opinion polls
Polling organisation	Last date of polling	Source	Sample size	MoE	CAQ	PLQ	PQ	QS	Other	Lead
Forum	September 30, 2018	PDF			37	19	23	19	1	14
Ipsos	September 28, 2018	PDF			38	19	21	19	4	19
Mainstreet	27 September 2018	PDF			36	20	24	19	2	12
RC	September 22, 2018	PDF			36	18	23	21	2	13
CROP	September 17, 2018	PDF			35	29	18	16	2	6
leger	September 17, 2018	PDF			36	18	26	17	3	10
leger	August 28, 2018	PDF			42	21	23	9	6	19
Ipsos	21 August 2018	PDF			41	21	22	12	5	19
	14 August 2018	PDF			41	20	22	11	5	19
CROP	June 19, 2018	PDF			48	23	16	11	2	25
	June 10, 2018	PDF			44	18	23	10	6	21
	May 8, 2018	PDF			41	16	26	12	5	15
Ipsos	May 2 , 2018	PDF			40	20	24	10	5	16
	March 1, 2018	PDF			42	16	27	11	5	15
	24 January 2018	PDF			46	19	23	9	3	23
Mainstreet	December 8, 2017	PDF			33	23	27	16	2	6
Mainstreet	November 8, 2017	PDF			31	23	27	17	2	4
	November 30, 2017	PDF			43	20	23	12	3	10
	October 25, 2017	PDF			37	21	24	13	3	13
Mainstreet	October 11, 2017	PDF			28	24	30	17	2	2
	September 14, 2017	PDF			27	25	29	19	4	2
	August 24, 2017	PDF			33	22	27	14	4	6
	August 10, 2017	PDF			30	26	27	18		3
	June 21, 2017	PDF			33	22	26	17	2	7
	June 15, 2017	PDF			32	20	27	15	7	5
	12 May 2017	PDF			35	25	26	14	0	9
	March 30, 2017	PDF			26	30	31	14		1
	16 March 2017	PDF			25	22	31	17	6	6
	16 January 2017	PDF			27	26	33	11	2	6
	December 15, 2016	PDF			30	20	36	11	4	6
CROP	12 December 2016	PDF			28	28	29	11	4	1
CROP	November 21, 2016	PDF			31	24	30	13	3	1
	November 10, 2016	PDF			28	19	38	12	3	10
CROP	17 October 2016	PDF			26	27	36	10	1	9
CROP	19 September 2016	PDF			31	25	32	11	1	1
	September 1, 2016	PDF			28	21	36	12	3	8
	May 5, 2016	PDF			25	23	36	12	3	11
	22 March 2016	PDF			25	21	37	12	5	12
CROP	15 February 2016	PDF			21	26	36	13	3	10
	February 4, 2016	PDF			24	25	37	10	4	12
CROP	18 January 2016	PDF			22	24	33	19	2	9
CROP	December 14, 2015	PDF			25	19	38	16	3	13
	November 19, 2015	PDF			23	24	38	12	3	14
CROP	20 September 2015	PDF			20	26	37	15	2	11
CROP	17 August 2015	PDF			25	24	35	14	2	10
CROP	16 June 2015	PDF			19	25	41	13	2	16
	11 June 2015	PDF			23	26	39	11	2	13
CROP	20 May 2015	PDF			23	19	39	16	2	16
	17 May 2015	PDF			23	22	41	10	3	18
CROP	April 20 , 2015	PDF			29	23	33	14	2	4
	April 9, 2015	PDF			24	27	34	12	3	10
CROP	March 15, 2015	PDF			30	18	32	18	1	2
CROP	February 15, 2015	PDF			25	27	32	12	3	5
leger	5 February 2015	PDF			30	25	31	10	3	1
CROP	19 January 2015	PDF			27	26	31	14	2	5
	December 11, 2014	PDF			30	22	31	13	3	1
	November 17, 2014	PDF			27	28	27	15	2	1
	November 13, 2014	PDF			32	23	32	12	2	
CROP	20 October 2014	PDF			28	28	30	14	4	2
	25 September 2014	PDF			33	25	26	12	4	7
CROP	22 September 2014	PDF			36	24	26	13	1	10
	25 August 2014	PDF			28	31	27	11	3	3
CROP	August 18, 2014	PDF			32	31	22	13	2	1
	18 June 2014	PDF			32	29	24	11	3	3
CROP	June 16, 2014	PDF			35	27	24	12	3	8
	June 5, 2014	PDF			34	29	24	10	2	5
	19 May 2014	PDF			30	29	28	12	2	1
	8 May 2014	PDF			33	29	23	12	3	'10
CROP	April 21, 2014	PDF			28	28	27	13	3	

=== English ===
Timeline of opinion polls
Polling organisation	Last date of polling	Source	Sample size	MoE	CAQ	PLQ	PQ	QS	Other	Lead
Forum	September 30, 2018	PDF			17	60	8	11	5	43
Ipsos	September 28, 2018	PDF			12	73	4	8	1	51
Mainstreet	27 September 2018	PDF			13	68	3	7	10	55
RC	September 22, 2018	PDF			13	73	2	8	5	60
CROP	September 17, 2018	PDF			11	70	6	8	4	59
leger	September 17, 2018	PDF			13	70	3	7	5	57
leger	August 28, 2018	PDF			17	69	4	4	6	52
Ipsos	21 August 2018	PDF			17	62	6	6	9	45
Leger	14 August 2018	PDF			18	62	4	4	12	44
CROP	June 19, 2018	PDF			8	68	9	10	5	
Leger	June 10, 2018	PDF			15	62	5	6	13	
Ipsos	May 2 , 2018	PDF			13	74	4	3	7	
Leger	March 1, 2018	PDF			15	66	2	5		
Leger	24 January 2018	PDF			15	61	9	7	9	
Leger	August 24, 2017	PDF			9	69	3	5	14	
Leger	June 21, 2017	PDF			8	68	4	8	12	
Leger	June 15, 2017	PDF			12	65	6	7	10	
Mainstreet	March 30, 2017	PDF			7	87	2	4		
CROP	16 January 2017	PDF			16	68	4	9	2	
Leger	December 15, 2016	PDF			8	72	6	5	9	
CROP	12 December 2016	PDF			5	78	7	4	5	
CROP	November 21, 2016	PDF			6	82	3	6	3	
Leger	November 10, 2016	PDF			12	71	2	5	9	
CROP	17 October 2016	PDF			8	75	8	5	4	
CROP	19 September 2016	PDF			5	86	5	2	2	
Leger	September 1, 2016	PDF			6	77	5	5	6	
Leger	May 5, 2016	PDF			5	78	7	3	7	
Leger	22 March 2016	PDF			11	72	4	4	9	
Leger	February 4, 2016	PDF			10	74	2	8	6	
CROP	18 January 2016	PDF			6	75	6	5	8	
CROP	December 14, 2015	PDF			12	80	1	2	6	
Leger	November 19, 2015	PDF			9	75	10	4	2	
CROP	20 September 2015	PDF			9	77	2	8	4	
CROP	17 August 2015	PDF			13	71	7	9	0	
Leger	11 June 2015	PDF			11	74	5	5	5	
Leger	17 May 2015	PDF			9	70	7	9	4	
Leger	April 9, 2015	PDF			8	76	6	4	6	
Leger	5 February 2015	PDF			8	78	4	5	6	
Leger	December 11, 2014	PDF			9	76	7	4	4	
Leger	November 13, 2014	PDF			5	85	4	5	2	
CROP	20 October 2014	PDF			7	86	3	3	0	
Leger	25 September 2014	PDF			10	82	3	2	3	
CROP	22 September 2014	PDF			6	76	5	12	1	
Leger	25 August 2014	PDF			8	73	5	7	7	
CROP	June 16, 2014	PDF			10	83	1	5	1	
Leger	18 June 2014	PDF			10	79	4	2	5	
Leger	June 5, 2014	PDF			10	77	4	4	6	
Leger	8 May 2014	PDF			7	79	3	8	3	71
CROP	April 21, 2014	PDF			3	86	2	6	2	80
