= Opinion polling for the 2021 Canadian federal election by constituency =

Various polling organizations have been conducting opinion polling in specific ridings in the lead up to the 2021 Canadian federal election. The results of publicized opinion polling for individual constituencies are detailed in this article.

Given the expense of polling individual constituencies, constituencies are usually only polled if they are of some particular interest, e.g. they are thought to be marginal or facing an impending by-election. The constituencies polled are not necessarily representative of a national average swing. Under the first-past-the-post electoral system the true marginal seats, by definition, will be decisive as to the outcome of the election.

== Constituency polls ==
=== Alberta ===
==== Banff—Airdrie ====
Polling Firm	Last Date of Polling	Link	Liberal	Cons.	NDP	Green	PPC	Others	Undecided	Margin of Error^{[1]}	Sample Size^{[2]}	Polling Method^{[3]}
Spadina Strategies	September 14, 2021	HTML	12.9	43.7	11.7	1.3	9.8	13.1	6.7	±5.23 pp	350	IVR

==== Calgary Skyview ====
Polling Firm	Last Date of Polling	Link	Liberal	Cons.	NDP	Green	PPC	Others	Undecided	Margin of Error^{[1]}	Sample Size^{[2]}	Polling Method^{[3]}
Mainstreet Research	August 20, 2021	PDF	37.6	35.4	12.8	2.6	1.3	1.1	9.2	±5.6 pp	303	IVR
2019 Election	October 21, 2019	HTML	28.3	52.5	14.9	1.6	1.2	1.5	N/A	±0.0 pp	50,552	Election

==== Edmonton Centre ====
Polling Firm	Last Date of Polling	Link	Liberal	Cons.	NDP	Green	PPC	Others	Undecided	Margin of Error^{[1]}	Sample Size^{[2]}	Polling Method^{[3]}
Mainstreet Research	August 28, 2021	PDF	40	26	22	2	1	3	6	±5.6 pp	303	IVR
2019 Election	October 21, 2019	HTML	33.0	41.5	20.6	2.6	1.5	0.8	N/A	±0.0 pp	53,092	Election

==== Edmonton Griesbach ====
Polling Firm	Last Date of Polling	Link	Liberal	Cons.	NDP	Green	PPC	Other	Undecided	Margin of Error^{[1]}	Sample Size^{[2]}	Polling Method^{[3]}
Mainstreet Research	September 12, 2021	PDF	19.0	38.4	28.2	1.7	3.9	3.7	5.1	±4.6 pp	454	IVR
2019 Election	October 21, 2019	HTML	17.3	51.4	25.1	2.5	2.3	1.4	N/A	±0.0 pp	46,963	Election

==== Edmonton Mill Woods ====
Polling Firm	Last Date of Polling	Link	Liberal	Cons.	NDP	Green	PPC	Others	Undecided	Margin of Error^{[1]}	Sample Size^{[2]}	Polling Method^{[3]}
Mainstreet Research	September 9, 2021	PDF	37	35.4	14.4	1.4	6.9	1.6	3.3	±5 pp	299	IVR
2019 Election	October 21, 2019	HTML	33.6	50.3	12.1	1.8	1.8	0.4	N/A	±0.0 pp	53,177	Election

=== British Columbia ===
==== Burnaby North—Seymour ====
Polling Firm	Last Date of Polling	Link	Liberal	Cons.	NDP	Green	PPC	Others	Undecided	Margin of Error^{[1]}	Sample Size^{[2]}	Polling Method^{[3]}
Mainstreet Research	September 7, 2021	PDF	28.1	29.6	26	5.2	2.3	0.9	7.9	±5 pp	379	IVR
Mainstreet Research	August 5, 2021	HTML	32.8	22.7	13.2	N/A	N/A	6.2	25.1	±4.1 pp	558	IVR
2019 Election	October 21, 2019	HTML	35.5	19.5	32.3	9.6	2.2	1	N/A	±0.0 pp	50,525	Election

==== Cloverdale—Langley City ====
Polling Firm	Last Date of Polling	Link	Liberal	Cons.	NDP	Green	PPC	Others	Undecided	Margin of Error^{[1]}	Sample Size^{[2]}	Polling Method^{[3]}
Mainstreet Research	September 12, 2021	PDF	28	40	17	3	7	3	2	±5.6 pp	307	IVR

==== Delta ====
Polling Firm	Last Date of Polling	Link	Liberal	Cons.	NDP	Green	PPC	Others	Undecided	Margin of Error^{[1]}	Sample Size^{[2]}	Polling Method^{[3]}
Mainstreet Research	August 30, 2021	PDF	34	36	19	3	3	1	4	±5.6 pp	304	IVR

==== Nanaimo—Ladysmith ====
Polling Firm	Last Date of Polling	Link	Liberal	Cons.	NDP	Green	PPC	Others	Undecided	Margin of Error^{[1]}	Sample Size^{[2]}	Polling Method^{[3]}
Oracle Poll	September 7, 2021	HTML	7.6	21.0	19.0	27.8	1.0	N/A	23.6	±4.4 pp	500	Telephone
2019 Election	October 21, 2019	HTML	13.6	25.9	23.6	34.6	1.5	0.9	N/A	±0.0 pp	53,296	Election

==== Pitt Meadows—Maple Ridge ====
Polling Firm	Last Date of Polling	Link	Liberal	Cons.	NDP	Green	PPC	Others	Undecided	Margin of Error^{[1]}	Sample Size^{[2]}	Polling Method^{[3]}
Mainstreet Research	August 28, 2021	PDF	26	33	28	3	2	2	6	±5.6 pp	306	IVR

==== Port Moody—Coquitlam ====
Polling Firm	Last Date of Polling	Link	Liberal	Cons.	NDP	Green	PPC	Others	Undecided	Margin of Error^{[1]}	Sample Size^{[2]}	Polling Method^{[3]}
Mainstreet Research	September 13, 2021	PDF	24.4	29.0	29.5	3.6	8.9	2.0	2.7	±5.5 pp	320	IVR

==== Surrey Centre ====
Polling Firm	Last Date of Polling	Link	Liberal	Cons.	NDP	Green	PPC	Others	Undecided	Margin of Error^{[1]}	Sample Size^{[2]}	Polling Method^{[3]}
Mainstreet Research	August 4, 2021	PDF	37	22	22	6	5	1	8	±6.3 pp	285	IVR

==== Vancouver Granville ====
Polling Firm	Last Date of Polling	Link	Liberal	Cons.	NDP	Green	PPC	Others	Undecided	Margin of Error^{[1]}	Sample Size^{[2]}	Polling Method^{[3]}
Mainstreet Research	August 15, 2021	PDF	33	25	15	7	3	2	15	±5.9 pp	280	IVR
2019 Election	October 21, 2019	HTML	26.6	21.9	13.1	5.1	0.8	32.6	N/A	±0.0 pp	53,296	Election

==== Vancouver South ====
Polling Firm	Last Date of Polling	Link	Liberal	Cons.	NDP	Green	PPC	Others	Undecided	Margin of Error^{[1]}	Sample Size^{[2]}	Polling Method^{[3]}
Mainstreet Research	August 15, 2021	PDF	39	17	25	4	6	2	8	±6.3 pp	242	IVR

==== West Vancouver—Sunshine Coast—Sea to Sky Country ====
Polling Firm	Last Date of Polling	Link	Liberal	Cons.	NDP	Green	PPC	Others	Undecided	Margin of Error^{[1]}	Sample Size^{[2]}	Polling Method^{[3]}
Mainstreet Research	September 5, 2021	PDF	25.1	42.3	15.1	6.2	5.1	0.7	5.4	±3.8 pp	662	IVR
Mainstreet Research	August 5, 2021	HTML	23.1	27.5	19.4	11.9	N/A	4	14.1	±3.9 pp	624	IVR
2019 Election	October 21, 2019	HTML	34.9	26.7	13.9	22.4	1.6	0.5	N/A	±0.0 pp	64,980	Election

=== Manitoba ===
==== Charleswood—St. James—Assiniboia—Headingley ====
Polling Firm	Last Date of Polling	Link	Liberal	Cons.	NDP	Green	PPC	Other	Undecided	Margin of Error^{[1]}	Sample Size^{[2]}	Polling Method^{[3]}
Mainstreet Research	August 20, 2021	PDF	36.2	37.0	10.8	1.8	3.0	1.4	9.8	± pp	317	IVR
2019 Election	October 21, 2019	HTML	35.5	40.7	14.2	4.7	4.3	0.7	N/A	±0.0 pp	46,228	Election

==== Kildonan—St. Paul ====
Polling Firm	Last Date of Polling	Link	Liberal	Cons.	NDP	Green	PPC	Others	Undecided	Margin of Error^{[1]}	Sample Size^{[2]}	Polling Method^{[3]}
Mainstreet Research	September 14, 2021	PDF	33	30	18	5	7	1	7	±5.5 pp	322	IVR
2019 Election	October 21, 2019	HTML	27.9	44.8	21.2	4.0	1.2	0.9	N/A	±0.0 pp	44,298	Election

==== Winnipeg South ====
Polling Firm	Last Date of Polling	Link	Liberal	Cons.	NDP	Green	PPC	Others	Undecided	Margin of Error^{[1]}	Sample Size^{[2]}	Polling Method^{[3]}
Mainstreet Research	September 8, 2021	PDF	43.4	28.1	16.3	2	3.4	0	6.9	±5 pp	304	IVR
2019 Election	October 21, 2019	HTML	42.1	38.7	13.9	4.3	0.9	N/A	N/A	±0.0 pp	47,889	Election

=== Newfoundland and Labrador ===
==== Bonavista—Burin—Trinity ====
Polling Firm	Last Date of Polling	Link	Liberal	Cons.	NDP	Green	PPC	Others	Undecided	Margin of Error^{[1]}	Sample Size^{[2]}	Polling Method^{[3]}
Mainstreet Research	September 9, 2021	PDF	43.2	30.5	10.5	0.6	3.4	1	10.9	±5 pp	298	IVR
2019 Election	October 21, 2019	HTML	45.7	39.5	12.0	2.9	N/A	N/A	N/A	±0.0 pp	32,179	Election

==== St. John’s East ====
Polling Firm	Last Date of Polling	Link	Liberal	Cons.	NDP	Green	PPC	Others	Undecided	Margin of Error^{[1]}	Sample Size^{[2]}	Polling Method^{[3]}
Mainstreet Research	September 7, 2021	PDF	45.3	15.2	26.7	1.6	2.2	0	9	±5.1 pp	363	IVR
2019 Election	October 21, 2019	HTML	33.2	18.1	46.9	1.8	N/A	N/A	N/A	±0.0 pp	42,940	Election

=== New Brunswick ===
==== Fredericton ====
Polling Firm	Last Date of Polling	Link	Liberal	Cons.	NDP	Green	PPC	Others	Undecided	Margin of Error^{[1]}	Sample Size^{[2]}	Polling Method^{[3]}
Mainstreet Research	September 1, 2021	PDF	40	31	10	5	3	6	5	±5.6 pp	307	IVR

==== Saint John—Rothesay ====
Polling Firm	Last Date of Polling	Link	Liberal	Cons.	NDP	Green	PPC	Others	Undecided	Margin of Error^{[1]}	Sample Size^{[2]}	Polling Method^{[3]}
Mainstreet Research	September 1, 2021	PDF	42	30	13	2	4	1	7	±5.7 pp	300	IVR
2019 Election	October 21, 2019	HTML	37.4	34.0	12.2	10.1	3.1	3.2	N/A	±0.0 pp	42,940	Election

=== Nova Scotia ===
==== Cape Breton—Canso ====
Polling Firm	Last Date of Polling	Link	Liberal	Cons.	NDP	Green	PPC	Others	Undecided	Margin of Error^{[1]}	Sample Size^{[2]}	Polling Method^{[3]}
Mainstreet Research	August 19, 2021	PDF	39.3	37.6	8.2	1.9	3.6	2.3	7.1	±5 pp	301	IVR
2019 Election	October 21, 2019	HTML	38.9	34.5	14.8	7.7	2.2	1.9	N/A	±0.0 pp	42,940	Election

==== Sydney—Victoria ====
Polling Firm	Last Date of Polling	Link	Liberal	Cons.	NDP	Green	PPC	Others	Undecided	Margin of Error^{[1]}	Sample Size^{[2]}	Polling Method^{[3]}
Mainstreet Research	September 7, 2021	PDF	42	29	13	3	3	0	10	±4.7 pp	442	IVR
2019 Election	October 21, 2019	HTML	30.9	27.7	20.1	5.5	N/A	21.3	N/A	±0.0 pp	40,565	Election

==== West Nova ====
Polling Firm	Last Date of Polling	Link	Liberal	Cons.	NDP	Green	PPC	Others	Undecided	Margin of Error^{[1]}	Sample Size^{[2]}	Polling Method^{[3]}
Mainstreet Research	September 14, 2021	PDF	38	34	11	1	11	1	3	±6 pp	262	IVR
2019 Election	October 21, 2019	HTML	36.4	39.3	10.7	12.7	N/A	0.9	N/A	±0.0 pp	46,798	Election

=== Ontario ===
==== Aurora—Oak Ridges—Richmond Hill ====
Polling Firm	Last Date of Polling	Link	Liberal	Cons.	NDP	Green	PPC	Other	Undecided	Margin of Error^{[1]}	Sample Size^{[2]}	Polling Method^{[3]}
Mainstreet Research	August 23, 2021	HTML	47	34	12	2	4	2	N/A	±5 pp	309	IVR
2019 Election	October 21, 2019	HTML	42.4	44.4	7.2	4.1	1.0	1.0	N/A	±0.0 pp	53,109	Election

==== Davenport ====
Polling Firm	Last Date of Polling	Link	Liberal	Cons.	NDP	Green	PPC	Others	Undecided	Margin of Error^{[1]}	Sample Size^{[2]}	Polling Method^{[3]}
Mainstreet Research	September 8, 2021	PDF	46	11	28	6	3	2	5	±5.6 pp	303	IVR

==== Elgin—Middlesex—London ====
Polling Firm	Last Date of Polling	Link	Liberal	Cons.	NDP	Green	PPC	Others	Undecided	Margin of Error^{[1]}	Sample Size^{[2]}	Polling Method^{[3]}
Mainstreet Research	September 11, 2021	PDF	32	36	14	2	10	1	5	±5.1 pp	294	IVR

==== Flamborough—Glanbrook ====
Polling Firm	Last Date of Polling	Link	Liberal	Cons.	NDP	Green	PPC	Others	Undecided	Margin of Error^{[1]}	Sample Size^{[2]}	Polling Method^{[3]}
Mainstreet Research	September 15, 2021	PDF	30	33	16	6	7	0	7	±5.6 pp	303	IVR
2019 Election	October 21, 2019	HTML	36.5	39.2	16.5	6.13	1.5	N/A	N/A	±0.0 pp	62,920	Election

==== Hamilton East—Stoney Creek ====
Polling Firm	Last Date of Polling	Link	Liberal	Cons.	NDP	Green	PPC	Others	Undecided	Margin of Error^{[1]}	Sample Size^{[2]}	Polling Method^{[3]}
Mainstreet Research	August 27, 2021	PDF	28	25	26	5	2	5	10	±5.6 pp	305	IVR

==== Kanata—Carleton ====
Polling Firm	Last Date of Polling	Link	Liberal	Cons.	NDP	Green	PPC	Others	Undecided	Margin of Error^{[1]}	Sample Size^{[2]}	Polling Method^{[3]}
Mainstreet Research	September 8, 2021	PDF	36.3	32.8	18.5	4.5	1.5	0.2	6.2	±5 pp	297	IVR
2019 Election	October 21, 2019	HTML	43	36.5	12.5	6.6	1.4	N/A	N/A	±0.0 pp	66,772	Election

==== King—Vaughan ====
Polling Firm	Last Date of Polling	Link	Liberal	Cons.	NDP	Green	PPC	Others	Undecided	Margin of Error^{[1]}	Sample Size^{[2]}	Polling Method^{[3]}
Mainstreet Research	September 16, 2021	PDF	48.1	38.6	7.4	1.6	3.7	0.2	0.4	±5.6 pp	298	IVR
2019 Election	October 21, 2019	HTML	45	43.2	6.7	3.9	1.1	N/A	N/A	±0.0 pp	64,446	Election

==== Kitchener Centre ====
Polling Firm	Last Date of Polling	Link	Liberal	Cons.	NDP	Green	PPC	Others	Undecided	Margin of Error^{[1]}	Sample Size^{[2]}	Polling Method^{[3]}
Mainstreet Research	September 18, 2021	HTML	34	27	13	20	5	0	N/A	±5.9 pp	287	IVR
Mainstreet Research	August 24, 2021	PDF	27.8	23.4	23.6	11.9	1.2	6.7	5.5	±5.9 pp	280	IVR
Mainstreet Research	August 5, 2021	HTML	25.8	17.9	11.1	14.3	N/A	4	26.8	±4 pp	601	IVR
2019 Election	October 21, 2019	HTML	36.7	23.8	11.3	26	1.9	0.4	N/A	±0.0 pp	55,374	Election

==== Niagara Centre ====
Polling Firm	Last Date of Polling	Link	Liberal	Cons.	NDP	Green	PPC	Others	Undecided	Margin of Error^{[1]}	Sample Size^{[2]}	Polling Method^{[3]}
Mainstreet Research	September 10, 2021	PDF	35	27	17	2	10	1	8	±5 pp	301	IVR

==== Oakville ====
Polling Firm	Last Date of Polling	Link	Liberal	Cons.	NDP	Green	PPC	Others	Undecided	Margin of Error^{[1]}	Sample Size^{[2]}	Polling Method^{[3]}
Mainstreet Research	August 30, 2021	PDF	40	39	11	1	3	1	5	±5.5 pp	314	IVR

==== Ottawa Centre ====
Polling Firm	Last Date of Polling	Link	Liberal	Cons.	NDP	Green	PPC	Others	Undecided	Margin of Error^{[1]}	Sample Size^{[2]}	Polling Method^{[3]}
Mainstreet Research	August 23, 2021	PDF	42	21	28	5	1	1	2	±5.3 pp	344	IVR

==== Parkdale—High Park ====
Polling Firm	Last Date of Polling	Link	Liberal	Cons.	NDP	Green	PPC	Others	Undecided	Margin of Error^{[1]}	Sample Size^{[2]}	Polling Method^{[3]}
Mainstreet Research	August 5, 2021	HTML	34.5	14.3	16.6	8.8	N/A	2.9	23	±4 pp	600	IVR
2019 Election	October 21, 2019	HTML	47.4	13.2	31.5	6.4	1.1	1.1	N/A	±0.0 pp	60,887	Election

==== Peterborough—Kawartha ====
Polling Firm	Last Date of Polling	Link	Liberal	Cons.	NDP	Green	PPC	Others	Undecided	Margin of Error^{[1]}	Sample Size^{[2]}	Polling Method^{[3]}
Mainstreet Research	September 1, 2021	PDF	25.8	37.5	17.9	8.6	3.4	0.9	5.9	±5.7 pp	291	IVR
2019 Election	October 21, 2019	HTML	39.3	34.9	17.1	7.1	1.3	0.5	N/A	±0.0 pp	69,801	Election

==== Spadina—Fort York ====
Polling Firm	Last Date of Polling	Link	Liberal	Cons.	NDP	Green	PPC	Others	Undecided	Margin of Error^{[1]}	Sample Size^{[2]}	Polling Method^{[3]}
Mainstreet Research	August 15, 2021	PDF	47.5	18.9	12	3.7	3.9	3.9	10.1	±4.1 pp	574	IVR
2019 Election	October 21, 2019	HTML	55.8	17.6	20.1	5.2	1.1	1.1	N/A	±0.0 pp	60,887	Election

==== St. Catharines ====
Polling Firm	Last Date of Polling	Link	Liberal	Cons.	NDP	Green	PPC	Others	Undecided	Margin of Error^{[1]}	Sample Size^{[2]}	Polling Method^{[3]}
Mainstreet Research	August 2, 2021	PDF	30	34	21	2	4	3	7	±5.9 pp	273	IVR

==== Toronto Centre ====
Polling Firm	Last Date of Polling	Link	Liberal	Cons.	NDP	Green	PPC	Others	Undecided	Margin of Error^{[1]}	Sample Size^{[2]}	Polling Method^{[3]}
Mainstreet Research	August 5, 2021	HTML	39.9	8.6	9.5	15.5	N/A	2.3	24.3	±4.1 pp	574	IVR
2020 By-election	October 26, 2020	HTML	42	5.7	17	32.7	1.1	1.6	N/A	±0.0 pp	25,205	Election
2019 Election	October 21, 2019	HTML	57.4	12.1	22.3	7.1	N/A	1.2	N/A	±0.0 pp	54,512	Election

==== Windsor—Tecumseh ====
Polling Firm	Last Date of Polling	Link	Liberal	Cons.	NDP	Green	PPC	Others	Undecided	Margin of Error^{[1]}	Sample Size^{[2]}	Polling Method^{[3]}
Mainstreet Research	September 16, 2021	PDF	26.8	18.8	28.1	3.5	16.6	0.8	5.5	±4.9 pp	390	IVR
2019 Election	October 21, 2019	HTML	33.4	27.8	32.3	3.8	2.2	0.3	N/A	±0.0 pp	56,957	Election

=== Prince Edward Island ===
==== Malpeque ====
Polling Firm	Last Date of Polling	Link	Liberal	Cons.	NDP	Green	PPC	Others	Undecided	Margin of Error^{[1]}	Sample Size^{[2]}	Polling Method^{[3]}
Mainstreet Research	August 5, 2021	HTML	36.5	25.3	7	12.1	N/A	0.2	19	±5.9 pp	280	IVR
2019 Election	October 21, 2019	HTML	41.4	25.6	6.5	26.5	N/A	0.4	N/A	±0.0 pp	23,039	Election

=== Quebec ===
==== Abitibi—Témiscamingue ====
Polling Firm	Last Date of Polling	Link	Liberal	Cons.	NDP	Bloc	Green	PPC	Others	Undecided	Margin of Error^{[1]}	Sample Size^{[2]}	Polling Method^{[3]}
SOM	March 29, 2021	HTML	25	9	5.5	20	N/A	N/A	6	35	±5.1 pp	501	IVR
2019 Election	October 21, 2019	HTML	25	15	10	45.5	4	1	0	N/A	±0.0 pp	50,155	Election

==== Beauport—Limoilou ====
Polling Firm	Last Date of Polling	Link	Liberal	Cons.	NDP	Bloc	Green	PPC	Others	Undecided	Margin of Error^{[1]}	Sample Size^{[2]}	Polling Method^{[3]}
Mainstreet Research	September 4, 2021	PDF	26	30	12	19	2	1	5	5	±5.5 pp	313	IVR

==== Berthier—Maskinongé ====
Polling Firm	Last Date of Polling	Link	Liberal	Cons.	NDP	Bloc	Green	PPC	Others	Undecided	Margin of Error^{[1]}	Sample Size^{[2]}	Polling Method^{[3]}
Mainstreet Research	September 10, 2021	PDF	16.7	14.2	14.1	35.1	3.8	7.4	1.3	7.5	±5.6 pp	308	IVR

==== Châteauguay—Lacolle ====
Polling Firm	Last Date of Polling	Link	Liberal	Cons.	NDP	Bloc	Green	PPC	Others	Undecided	Margin of Error^{[1]}	Sample Size^{[2]}	Polling Method^{[3]}
Mainstreet Research	September 4, 2021	PDF	33	17	8	27	6	1	4	5	±5.1 pp	370	IVR

==== Jonquière ====
Polling Firm	Last Date of Polling	Link	Liberal	Cons.	NDP	Bloc	Green	PPC	Others	Undecided	Margin of Error^{[1]}	Sample Size^{[2]}	Polling Method^{[3]}
Mainstreet Research	September 2, 2021	PDF	24.0	27.7	6.6	24.5	4.2	1.5	2.9	8.5	±5.5 pp	314	IVR

==== La Prairie ====
Polling Firm	Last Date of Polling	Link	Liberal	Cons.	NDP	Bloc	Green	PPC	Others	Undecided	Margin of Error^{[1]}	Sample Size^{[2]}	Polling Method^{[3]}
Mainstreet Research	September 11, 2021	PDF	31.0	14.4	5.4	40.8	0.4	2.4	2.3	3.3	±5.2 pp	355	IVR

==== Longueuil—Saint-Hubert ====
Polling Firm	Last Date of Polling	Link	Liberal	Cons.	NDP	Bloc	Green	PPC	Others	Undecided	Margin of Error^{[1]}	Sample Size^{[2]}	Polling Method^{[3]}
Mainstreet Research	August 27, 2021	PDF	42.4	5.1	6.1	34.1	4.0	1.7	0.3	6.4	±5.6 pp	311	IVR
2019 Election	October 21, 2019	HTML	34.2	6.3	8.5	38.5	6.1	1.3	0.4	N/A	±0.0 pp	59,844	Election

==== Pontiac ====
Polling Firm	Last Date of Polling	Link	Liberal	Cons.	NDP	Bloc	Green	PPC	Others	Undecided	Margin of Error^{[1]}	Sample Size^{[2]}	Polling Method^{[3]}
Mainstreet Research	August 19, 2021	PDF	33	24	14	9	2	4	2	12	±4.9 pp	398	IVR
2019 Election	October 21, 2019	HTML	48.9	16.8	10.5	16.1	6.1	1.3	0.4	N/A	±0.0 pp	62,508	Election

==== Rivière-des-Mille-Îles ====
Polling Firm	Last Date of Polling	Link	Liberal	Cons.	NDP	Bloc	Green	PPC	Others	Undecided	Margin of Error^{[1]}	Sample Size^{[2]}	Polling Method^{[3]}
Mainstreet Research	August 31, 2021	PDF	29	17	8	33	3	3	2	5	±4.7 pp	436	IVR

==== Shefford ====
Polling Firm	Last Date of Polling	Link	Liberal	Cons.	NDP	Bloc	Green	PPC	Others	Undecided	Margin of Error^{[1]}	Sample Size^{[2]}	Polling Method^{[3]}
Mainstreet Research	August 29, 2021	PDF	29	19	3	31	5	3	3	6	±5.5 pp	322	IVR

==== Thérèse-De Blainville ====
Polling Firm	Last Date of Polling	Link	Liberal	Cons.	NDP	Bloc	Green	PPC	Others	Undecided	Margin of Error^{[1]}	Sample Size^{[2]}	Polling Method^{[3]}
Mainstreet Research	September 13, 2021	PDF	38.2	10.8	4.6	40.1	1.1	2.8	0.2	2.2	±6.6 pp	221	IVR

==== Trois-Rivières ====
Polling Firm	Last Date of Polling	Link	Liberal	Cons.	NDP	Bloc	Green	PPC	Others	Undecided	Margin of Error^{[1]}	Sample Size^{[2]}	Polling Method^{[3]}
Mainstreet Research	September 15, 2021	PDF	28	32	2	28	1	0	1	7	±5 pp	300	IVR
2019 Election	October 21, 2019	HTML	26	25.2	16.7	28.5	2.5	0.9	0.2	N/A	±0.0 pp	60,538	Election

=== Saskatchewan ===
==== Saskatoon West ====
Polling Firm	Last Date of Polling	Link	Liberal	Cons.	NDP	Green	PPC	Others	Undecided	Margin of Error^{[1]}	Sample Size^{[2]}	Polling Method^{[3]}
Mainstreet Research	August 25, 2021	PDF	19	28.6	28.8	2.4	5.2	1.2	15.5	±5.6 pp	305	IVR
2019 Election	October 21, 2019	HTML	7.3	47.7	40.3	2.7	2.0	N/A	N/A	±0.0 pp	38,985	Election

== See also ==
- Opinion polling for the 2019 Canadian federal election by constituency
- Opinion polling for the 2021 Canadian federal election

== Notes ==
Notes

^{1} In cases when linked poll details distinguish between the margin of error associated with the total sample of respondents (including undecided and non-voters) and that of the subsample of decided/leaning voters, the latter is included in the table. Also not included is the margin of error created by rounding to the nearest whole number or any margin of error from methodological sources. Most online polls—because of their opt-in method of recruiting panellists which results in a non-random sample—cannot have a margin of error. In such cases, shown is what the margin of error would be for a survey using a random probability-based sample of equivalent size.
^{2} Refers to the total sample size, including undecided and non-voters.
^{3} "Telephone" refers to traditional telephone polls conducted by live interviewers; "IVR" refers to automated Interactive Voice Response polls conducted by telephone; "online" refers to polls conducted exclusively over the internet; "telephone/online" refers to polls which combine results from both telephone and online surveys, or for which respondents are initially recruited by telephone and then asked to complete an online survey.
