= Opinion polling for the 2015 Canadian federal election by constituency =

Various polling organizations conducted opinion polling in specific ridings in the lead up to the 2015 Canadian general election. The results of publicised opinion polling for individual constituencies are detailed in this article.

Opinion polls were conducted from the months following the previous general election held in May 2011, and increased in frequency leading up to the general election.

Given the expense of polling individual constituencies, constituencies are usually only polled if they are of some particular interest, e.g. they are thought to be marginal or facing an impending by-election. The constituencies polled are not necessarily representative of a national average swing. Under the first-past-the-post electoral system the true marginal seats, by definition, will be decisive as to the outcome of the election.

A total of 204 polls in 107 ridings across 9 provinces and 1 territory were conducted.

== Constituency polls ==
=== Alberta ===
==== Calgary Centre ====
Polling Firm	Last Date of Polling	Link	Cons.	NDP	Liberal	Green	Other	Margin of Error^{[1]}	Sample Size^{[2]}	Polling Method^{[3]}
Mainstreet Research	October 13, 2015	HTML	38	19	39	6	0	±3.72 pp	688	IVR
Environics	September 20, 2015	HTML	47	11	39	3	0	±4.3 pp	531	IVR
Environics	August 18, 2015	PDF	44	17	32	7	0	±4.3 pp	517	IVR
2012 By-election	November 26, 2012	HTML	37	4	33	26	1	±0.0 pp	27,732	Election
2011 Election	May 2, 2011	HTML	55	15	19	10	0	±0.0 pp	41,452	Election

==== Calgary Confederation ====
Polling Firm	Last Date of Polling	Link	Cons.	NDP	Liberal	Green	Other	Margin of Error^{[1]}	Sample Size^{[2]}	Polling Method^{[3]}
Mainstreet Research	September 14, 2015	HTML	37	19	38	6	0	±3.7 pp	679	IVR
2011 Election	May 2, 2011	HTML	52	16	18	14	0	±0.0 pp	50,770	Election

==== Edmonton Centre ====
Polling Firm	Last Date of Polling	Link	Cons.	NDP	Liberal	Green	Other	Margin of Error^{[1]}	Sample Size^{[2]}	Polling Method^{[3]}
ThinkHQ	October 15, 2015	PDF	36	24	33	4	2	±4.3 pp	517	IVR
Mainstreet Research	October 8, 2015	PDF	31	38	27	3	0	±3.7 pp	701	IVR
Forum Research	September 25, 2015	HTML	40	30	27	4	0	±5.0 pp	524	IVR
Environics	September 16, 2015	PDF	39	35	22	5	0	±4.2 pp	547	IVR
2011 Election	May 2, 2011	HTML	46	26	24	4	1	±0.0 pp	43,093	Election

==== Edmonton Griesbach ====
Polling Firm	Last Date of Polling	Link	Cons.	NDP	Liberal	Green	Other	Margin of Error^{[1]}	Sample Size^{[2]}	Polling Method^{[3]}
Environics	August 16, 2015	PDF	32	48	15	5	0	±4.3 pp	509	IVR
2011 Election	May 2, 2011	HTML	53	37	7	3	0	±0.0 pp	37,766	Election

==== Edmonton Manning ====
Polling Firm	Last Date of Polling	Link	Cons.	NDP	Liberal	Green	Other	Margin of Error^{[1]}	Sample Size^{[2]}	Polling Method^{[3]}
Environics	September 16, 2015	PDF	45	33	18	4	0	±4.3 pp	512	IVR
2011 Election	May 2, 2011	HTML	55	27	9	3	6	±0.0 pp	34,180	Election

==== Edmonton Mill Woods ====
Polling Firm	Last Date of Polling	Link	Cons.	NDP	Liberal	Green	Other	Margin of Error^{[1]}	Sample Size^{[2]}	Polling Method^{[3]}
Mainstreet Research	October 8, 2015	PDF	39	15	39	7	0	±3.73 pp	684	IVR
2011 Election	May 2, 2011	HTML	59	25	12	3	1	±0.0 pp	35,454	Election

==== Edmonton Riverbend ====
Polling Firm	Last Date of Polling	Link	Cons.	NDP	Liberal	Green	Other	Margin of Error^{[1]}	Sample Size^{[2]}	Polling Method^{[3]}
Environics	September 16, 2015	PDF	44	34	18	4	0	±4.3 pp	522	IVR
2011 Election	May 2, 2011	HTML	59	21	15	5	0	±0.0 pp	43,267	Election

==== Edmonton West ====
Polling Firm	Last Date of Polling	Link	Cons.	NDP	Liberal	Green	Other	Margin of Error^{[1]}	Sample Size^{[2]}	Polling Method^{[3]}
Environics	September 16, 2015	PDF	48	19	29	4	0	±3.9 pp	618	IVR
2011 Election	May 2, 2011	HTML	64	19	13	4	0	±0.0 pp	43,267	Election

==== Fort McMurray—Cold Lake ====
Polling Firm	Last Date of Polling	Link	Cons.	NDP	Liberal	Green	Other	Margin of Error^{[1]}	Sample Size^{[2]}	Polling Method^{[3]}
Mainstreet Research	September 10, 2015	HTML	45	15	35	5	0	±4.4 pp	494	IVR
2011 Election	May 2, 2011	HTML	73	13	11	4	0	±0.0 pp	25,650	Election

==== Lethbridge ====
Polling Firm	Last Date of Polling	Link	Cons.	NDP	Liberal	Green	Other	Margin of Error^{[1]}	Sample Size^{[2]}	Polling Method^{[3]}
Mainstreet Research	October 13, 2015	HTML	56	26	13	4	0	±3.81 pp	657	IVR
Environics	September 17, 2015	PDF	48	34	14	5	0	±3.8 pp	639	IVR
2011 Election	May 2, 2011	HTML	52	30	9	5	4	±0.0 pp	41,165	Election

==== St. Albert—Edmonton ====
Polling Firm	Last Date of Polling	Link	Cons.	NDP	Liberal	Green	Other	Margin of Error^{[1]}	Sample Size^{[2]}	Polling Method^{[3]}
Mainstreet Research	October 13, 2015	HTML	43	20	7	2	28	±3.74 pp	681	IVR
Forum Research	September 25, 2015	HTML	38	19	10	4	29	±5.0 pp	490	IVR
Environics	September 17, 2015	PDF	39	20	15	4	22	±3.1 pp	1,030	IVR
2011 Election	May 2, 2011	HTML	64	20	11	5	0	±0.0 pp	42,842	Election

==== Yellowhead ====
Polling Firm	Last Date of Polling	Link	Cons.	NDP	Liberal	Green	Other	Margin of Error^{[1]}	Sample Size^{[2]}	Polling Method^{[3]}
Mainstreet Research	September 10, 2015	HTML	63	15	15	3	3	±4.1 pp	569	IVR
2014 By-election	November 17, 2014	HTML	63	10	20	5	3	±0.0 pp	12,601	Election
Forum Research	November 16, 2014	PDF	51	13	24	0	13	±6.0 pp	311	IVR
Forum Research	November 11, 2014	PDF	62	12	16	0	10	±5.6 pp	360	IVR
2011 Election	May 2, 2011	HTML	78	13	3	5	1	±0.0 pp	40,013	Election

=== British Columbia ===
==== Burnaby North—Seymour ====
Polling Firm	Last Date of Polling	Link	Cons.	NDP	Liberal	Green	Other	Margin of Error^{[1]}	Sample Size^{[2]}	Polling Method^{[3]}
Mainstreet Research	October 10, 2015	HTML	38	26	27	9	0	±3.65 pp	716	IVR
Insights West	October 10, 2015	HTML	33	36	21	9	1	±4.9 pp	400	Telephone
Insights West	September 13, 2015	HTML	33	37	21	9	0	±5.6 pp	301	Telephone
Insights West	May 11, 2015	PDF	20	46	8	25	1	±5.6 pp	301	Telephone
2011 Election	May 2, 2011	HTML	44	35	16	4	1	±0.0 pp	43,290	Election

==== Cariboo—Prince George ====
Polling Firm	Last Date of Polling	Link	Cons.	NDP	Liberal	Green	Other	Margin of Error^{[1]}	Sample Size^{[2]}	Polling Method^{[3]}
Environics	October 11, 2015	PDF	30	36	29	5	0	±4.4 pp	500	IVR
2011 Election	May 2, 2011	HTML	56	30	5	6	2	±0.0 pp	43,239	Election

==== Coquitlam—Port Coquitlam ====
Polling Firm	Last Date of Polling	Link	Cons.	NDP	Liberal	Green	Other	Margin of Error^{[1]}	Sample Size^{[2]}	Polling Method^{[3]}
Environics	October 11, 2015	PDF	31	34	29	6	0	±4.4 pp	504	IVR
2011 Election	May 2, 2011	HTML	56	31	8	4	1	±0.0 pp	40,286	Election

==== Courtenay—Alberni ====
Polling Firm	Last Date of Polling	Link	Cons.	NDP	Liberal	Green	Other	Margin of Error^{[1]}	Sample Size^{[2]}	Polling Method^{[3]}
Insights West	October 10, 2015	HTML	32	34	18	15	1	±4.9 pp	400	Telephone
Mainstreet Research	October 8, 2015	PDF	30	33	20	16	0	±3.76 pp	672	IVR
Insights West	September 13, 2015	HTML	33	39	13	12	3	±5.6 pp	301	Telephone
Insights West	May 11, 2015	PDF	30	42	14	11	3	±5.6 pp	301	Telephone
2011 Election	May 2, 2011	HTML	45	41	7	7	1	±0.0 pp	54,470	Election

==== Cowichan—Malahat—Langford ====
Polling Firm	Last Date of Polling	Link	Cons.	NDP	Liberal	Green	Other	Margin of Error^{[1]}	Sample Size^{[2]}	Polling Method^{[3]}
Insights West	October 5, 2015	HTML	28	35	14	19	4	±4.9 pp	400	Telephone
Insights West	May 11, 2015	PDF	28	41	15	10	5	±5.6 pp	302	Telephone
2011 Election	May 2, 2011	HTML	43	44	6	7	0	±0.0 pp	47,766	Election

==== Esquimalt—Saanich—Sooke ====
Polling Firm	Last Date of Polling	Link	Cons.	NDP	Liberal	Green	Other	Margin of Error^{[1]}	Sample Size^{[2]}	Polling Method^{[3]}
Insights West	October 10, 2015	HTML	19	39	20	21	1	±5.6 pp	300	Telephone
Insights West	September 13, 2015	HTML	20	39	19	19	3	±5.6 pp	300	Telephone
Insights West	May 11, 2015	PDF	17	50	14	16	4	±5.6 pp	301	Telephone
2011 Election	May 2, 2011	HTML	37	39	10	13	0	±0.0 pp	56,652	Election

==== Fleetwood—Port Kells ====
Polling Firm	Last Date of Polling	Link	Cons.	NDP	Liberal	Green	Other	Margin of Error^{[1]}	Sample Size^{[2]}	Polling Method^{[3]}
Mainstreet Research	October 10, 2015	HTML	35	24	35	6	0	±3.8 pp	661	IVR
2011 Election	May 2, 2011	HTML	48	33	16	3	0	±0.0 pp	34,582	Election

==== Kootenay—Columbia ====
Polling Firm	Last Date of Polling	Link	Cons.	NDP	Liberal	Green	Other	Margin of Error^{[1]}	Sample Size^{[2]}	Polling Method^{[3]}
Environics	September 19, 2015	HTML	37	37	15	11	0	±4.3 pp	529	IVR
2011 Election	May 2, 2011	HTML	50	39	3	6	1	±0.0 pp	52,801	Election

==== Nanaimo—Ladysmith ====
Polling Firm	Last Date of Polling	Link	Cons.	NDP	Liberal	Green	Other	Margin of Error^{[1]}	Sample Size^{[2]}	Polling Method^{[3]}
Insights West	October 5, 2015	HTML	26	35	18	21	1	±4.9 pp	400	Telephone
Environics	September 20, 2015	HTML	24	34	17	24	0	±3.7 pp	699	IVR
2011 Election	May 2, 2011	HTML	40	45	7	7	0	±0.0 pp	55,879	Election

==== North Island—Powell River ====
Polling Firm	Last Date of Polling	Link	Cons.	NDP	Liberal	Green	Other	Margin of Error^{[1]}	Sample Size^{[2]}	Polling Method^{[3]}
Environics	September 19, 2015	HTML	27	41	18	14	0	±4.2 pp	556	IVR
2011 Election	May 2, 2011	HTML	46	41	6	5	1	±0.0 pp	50,897	Election

==== North Okanagan—Shuswap ====
Polling Firm	Last Date of Polling	Link	Cons.	NDP	Liberal	Green	Other	Margin of Error^{[1]}	Sample Size^{[2]}	Polling Method^{[3]}
Environics	October 11, 2015	PDF	33	37	22	8	0	±3.6 pp	755	IVR
Mainstreet Research	October 10, 2015	PDF	45	26	24	5	0	±4.1 pp	567	IVR
Oraclepoll Research	October 6, 2015	PDF	38	41	12	9	0	±5.5 pp	312	Telephone
2011 Election	May 2, 2011	HTML	55	26	7	11	0	±0.0 pp	56,921	Election

==== North Vancouver ====
Polling Firm	Last Date of Polling	Link	Cons.	NDP	Liberal	Green	Other	Margin of Error^{[1]}	Sample Size^{[2]}	Polling Method^{[3]}
Insights West	October 10, 2015	HTML	33	11	41	15	0	±4.9 pp	400	Telephone
Insights West	September 13, 2015	HTML	31	14	41	13	1	±5.6 pp	297	Telephone
Insights West	July 7, 2015	PDF	30	24	31	14	1	±5.6 pp	305	Telephone
2011 Election	May 2, 2011	HTML	48	17	30	5	1	±0.0 pp	50,306	Election

==== Pitt Meadows—Maple Ridge ====
Polling Firm	Last Date of Polling	Link	Cons.	NDP	Liberal	Green	Other	Margin of Error^{[1]}	Sample Size^{[2]}	Polling Method^{[3]}
Environics	September 20, 2015	HTML	35	41	19	6	0	±4.2 pp	543	IVR
2011 Election	May 2, 2011	HTML	55	35	6	5	0	±0.0 pp	38,418	Election

==== Port Moody—Coquitlam ====
Polling Firm	Last Date of Polling	Link	Cons.	NDP	Liberal	Green	Other	Margin of Error^{[1]}	Sample Size^{[2]}	Polling Method^{[3]}
Environics	September 20, 2015	HTML	34	41	19	7	0	±4.3 pp	529	IVR
Environics	August 18, 2015	PDF	27	54	14	5	0	±4.3 pp	511	IVR
2011 Election	May 2, 2011	HTML	46	40	9	4	0	±0.0 pp	43,458	Election

==== South Okanagan—West Kootenay ====
Polling Firm	Last Date of Polling	Link	Cons.	NDP	Liberal	Green	Other	Margin of Error^{[1]}	Sample Size^{[2]}	Polling Method^{[3]}
Insights West	October 10, 2015	HTML	31	36	23	8	3	±5.6 pp	301	Telephone
Insights West	September 13, 2015	HTML	33	42	18	4	3	±5.6 pp	303	Telephone
Insights West	July 7, 2015	PDF	25	55	11	6	2	±5.6 pp	302	Telephone
2011 Election	May 2, 2011	HTML	39	45	7	8	1	±0.0 pp	56,652	Election

==== Vancouver Granville ====
Polling Firm	Last Date of Polling	Link	Cons.	NDP	Liberal	Green	Other	Margin of Error^{[1]}	Sample Size^{[2]}	Polling Method^{[3]}
Environics	October 11, 2015	PDF	28	33	35	4	0	±4.4 pp	505	IVR
Mainstreet Research	October 8, 2015	PDF	20	28	44	9	0	±3.8 pp	665	IVR
Environics	September 21, 2015	HTML	29	36	30	6	0	±4.2 pp	541	IVR
Environics	August 18, 2015	PDF	30	36	24	10	0	±4.5 pp	482	IVR
2011 Election	May 2, 2011	HTML	35	24	30	9	1	±0.0 pp	43,654	Election

==== Vancouver South ====
Polling Firm	Last Date of Polling	Link	Cons.	NDP	Liberal	Green	Other	Margin of Error^{[1]}	Sample Size^{[2]}	Polling Method^{[3]}
Insights West	October 10, 2015	HTML	33	19	38	8	1	±5.6 pp	301	Telephone
Insights West	September 13, 2015	HTML	27	22	40	8	3	±5.6 pp	303	Telephone
Insights West	July 7, 2015	PDF	24	30	39	4	3	±5.6 pp	301	Telephone
2011 Election	May 2, 2011	HTML	42	21	34	2	1	±0.0 pp	36,706	Election

==== West Vancouver—Sunshine Coast—Sea to Sky Country ====
Polling Firm	Last Date of Polling	Link	Cons.	NDP	Liberal	Green	Other	Margin of Error^{[1]}	Sample Size^{[2]}	Polling Method^{[3]}
Mainstreet Research	October 10, 2015	HTML	32	15	37	16	0	±3.76 pp	673	IVR
Insights West	October 10, 2015	HTML	31	14	42	13	0	±4.9 pp	403	Telephone
Insights West	September 13, 2015	HTML	30	22	34	11	2	±5.6 pp	302	Telephone
Environics	August 16, 2015	PDF	23	27	30	19	0	±4.1 pp	582	IVR
Insights West	July 7, 2015	PDF	30	26	31	12	1	±5.6 pp	301	Telephone
2011 Election	May 2, 2011	HTML	46	21	24	8	1	±0.0 pp	52,062	Election

=== Manitoba ===
==== Elmwood—Transcona ====
Polling Firm	Last Date of Polling	Link	Cons.	NDP	Liberal	Green	Other	Margin of Error^{[1]}	Sample Size^{[2]}	Polling Method^{[3]}
Environics	September 20, 2015	HTML	39	37	20	4	0	±4.2 pp	552	IVR
Environics	August 16, 2015	PDF	30	39	25	6	0	±4.3 pp	517	IVR
2011 Election	May 2, 2011	HTML	47	45	5	3	0	±0.0 pp	34,287	Election

==== Saint Boniface—Saint Vital ====
Polling Firm	Last Date of Polling	Link	Cons.	NDP	Liberal	Green	Other	Margin of Error^{[1]}	Sample Size^{[2]}	Polling Method^{[3]}
Mainstreet Research	September 21, 2015	HTML	33	25	37	5	0	±3.83 pp	651	IVR
2011 Election	May 2, 2011	HTML	50	16	31	3	0	±0.0 pp	40,418	Election

==== Winnipeg South Centre ====
Polling Firm	Last Date of Polling	Link	Cons.	NDP	Liberal	Green	Other	Margin of Error^{[1]}	Sample Size^{[2]}	Polling Method^{[3]}
Environics	September 20, 2015	HTML	31	23	38	8	0	±4.0 pp	597	IVR
2011 Election	May 2, 2011	HTML	41	18	37	3	1	±0.0 pp	46,619	Election

=== New Brunswick ===
==== Fredericton ====
Polling Firm	Last Date of Polling	Link	Cons.	NDP	Liberal	Green	Other	Margin of Error^{[1]}	Sample Size^{[2]}	Polling Method^{[3]}
Environics	October 4, 2015	HTML	32	14	43	12	0	±3.4 pp	839	IVR
Environics	September 19, 2015	PDF	32	20	37	10	0	±4.1 pp	580	IVR
Environics	August 16, 2015	PDF	29	26	34	12	0	±3.5 pp	799	IVR
2011 Election	May 2, 2011	HTML	47	24	24	4	1	±0.0 pp	38,772	Election

==== Saint John—Rothesay ====
Polling Firm	Last Date of Polling	Link	Cons.	NDP	Liberal	Green	Other	Margin of Error^{[1]}	Sample Size^{[2]}	Polling Method^{[3]}
Mainstreet Research	October 8, 2015	PDF	36	26	34	4	0	±4.33 pp	510	IVR
Environics	September 20, 2015	HTML	38	25	33	4	0	±3.7 pp	623	IVR
2011 Election	May 2, 2011	HTML	50	31	16	3	1	±0.0 pp	35,964	Election

=== Newfoundland and Labrador ===
==== Avalon ====
Polling Firm	Last Date of Polling	Link	Cons.	NDP	Liberal	Green	Other	Margin of Error^{[1]}	Sample Size^{[2]}	Polling Method^{[3]}
Mainstreet Research	September 17, 2015	HTML	14	19	43	4	19	±3.74 pp	679	IVR
2011 Election	May 2, 2011	HTML	37	29	33	1	1	±0.0 pp	35,623	Election

=== Nova Scotia ===
==== Central Nova ====
Polling Firm	Last Date of Polling	Link	Cons.	NDP	Liberal	Green	Other	Margin of Error^{[1]}	Sample Size^{[2]}	Polling Method^{[3]}
Environics	September 20, 2015	HTML	23	20	50	7	0	±4.1 pp	573	IVR
Mainstreet Research	September 17, 2015	HTML	36	26	30	8	0	±3.82 pp	652	IVR
2011 Election	May 2, 2011	HTML	55	27	14	4	0	±0.0 pp	38,878	Election

==== Cumberland—Colchester ====
Polling Firm	Last Date of Polling	Link	Cons.	NDP	Liberal	Green	Other	Margin of Error^{[1]}	Sample Size^{[2]}	Polling Method^{[3]}
Environics	September 20, 2015	HTML	32	7	54	6	0	±3.9 pp	617	IVR
Mainstreet Research	September 17, 2015	HTML	33	12	48	7	0	±3.79 pp	660	IVR
2011 Election	May 2, 2011	HTML	53	22	18	5	1	±0.0 pp	38,878	Election

=== Ontario ===
==== Ajax ====
Polling Firm	Last Date of Polling	Link	Cons.	NDP	Liberal	Green	Other	Margin of Error^{[1]}	Sample Size^{[2]}	Polling Method^{[3]}
Mainstreet Research	September 14, 2015	HTML	39	20	37	4	0	±3.7 pp	690	IVR
Forum Research	September 11, 2015	PDF	35	17	46	2	0	±4.0 pp	425	IVR
2011 Election	May 2, 2011	HTML	44	15	38	3	0	±0.0 pp	44,166	Election

==== Algoma—Manitoulin—Kapuskasing ====
Polling Firm	Last Date of Polling	Link	Cons.	NDP	Liberal	Green	Other	Margin of Error^{[1]}	Sample Size^{[2]}	Polling Method^{[3]}
Oraclepoll Research	October 8, 2015	HTML	30	45	20	5	0	±5.6 pp	300	Telephone
2011 Election	May 2, 2011	HTML	33	50	14	3	0	±0.0 pp	39,174	Election

==== Brampton Centre ====
Polling Firm	Last Date of Polling	Link	Cons.	NDP	Liberal	Green	Other	Margin of Error^{[1]}	Sample Size^{[2]}	Polling Method^{[3]}
Mainstreet Research	October 8, 2015	PDF	40	14	41	5	0	±3.8 pp	653	IVR
Forum Research	October 2, 2015	PDF	39	25	32	4	0	±5.0 pp	456	IVR
Mainstreet Research	January 28, 2014	PDF	40	24	30	6	0	±3.99 pp	598	IVR
2011 Election	May 2, 2011	HTML	46	23	25	4	1	±0.0 pp	34,796	Election

==== Brampton East ====
Polling Firm	Last Date of Polling	Link	Cons.	NDP	Liberal	Green	Other	Margin of Error^{[1]}	Sample Size^{[2]}	Polling Method^{[3]}
Mainstreet Research	September 29, 2015	HTML	35	24	36	5	0	±3.73pp	684	IVR
Mainstreet Research	January 28, 2014	PDF	23	38	36	3	0	±3.98 pp	600	IVR
2011 Election	May 2, 2011	HTML	29	38	31	2	1	±0.0 pp	28,625	Election

==== Brampton North ====
Polling Firm	Last Date of Polling	Link	Cons.	NDP	Liberal	Green	Other	Margin of Error^{[1]}	Sample Size^{[2]}	Polling Method^{[3]}
Mainstreet Research	October 8, 2015	PDF	37	16	46	1	0	±3.7 pp	689	IVR
Forum Research	October 4, 2015	PDF	39	24	34	2	0	±5.0 pp	336	IVR
Mainstreet Research	January 28, 2014	PDF	42	20	33	5	0	±3.99 pp	600	IVR
2011 Election	May 2, 2011	HTML	49	19	28	4	0	±0.0 pp	39,812	Election

==== Brampton South ====
Polling Firm	Last Date of Polling	Link	Cons.	NDP	Liberal	Green	Other	Margin of Error^{[1]}	Sample Size^{[2]}	Polling Method^{[3]}
Mainstreet Research	January 28, 2014	PDF	40	18	39	3	0	±3.99 pp	599	IVR
2011 Election	May 2, 2011	HTML	45	16	35	2	1	±0.0 pp	35,560	Election

==== Brampton West ====
Polling Firm	Last Date of Polling	Link	Cons.	NDP	Liberal	Green	Other	Margin of Error^{[1]}	Sample Size^{[2]}	Polling Method^{[3]}
Mainstreet Research	January 28, 2014	PDF	40	19	38	2	0	±3.99 pp	600	IVR
2011 Election	May 2, 2011	HTML	42	20	36	2	1	±0.0 pp	28,505	Election

==== Brantford—Brant ====
Polling Firm	Last Date of Polling	Link	Cons.	NDP	Liberal	Green	Other	Margin of Error^{[1]}	Sample Size^{[2]}	Polling Method^{[3]}
Environics	September 20, 2015	HTML	39	30	25	6	0	±3.9 pp	622	IVR
2011 Election	May 2, 2011	HTML	48	29	19	3	1	±0.0 pp	55,085	Election

==== Bruce—Grey—Owen Sound ====
Polling Firm	Last Date of Polling	Link	Cons.	NDP	Liberal	Green	Other	Margin of Error^{[1]}	Sample Size^{[2]}	Polling Method^{[3]}
Environics	October 11, 2015	PDF	41	16	40	4	0	±3.2 pp	966	IVR
Environics	September 21, 2015	HTML	43	20	29	9	0	±3.1 pp	1,022	IVR
2011 Election	May 2, 2011	HTML	56	18	16	10	1	±0.0 pp	51,054	Election

==== Cambridge ====
Polling Firm	Last Date of Polling	Link	Cons.	NDP	Liberal	Green	Other	Margin of Error^{[1]}	Sample Size^{[2]}	Polling Method^{[3]}
Environics	September 20, 2015	HTML	43	17	34	6	0	±4.2 pp	552	IVR
2011 Election	May 2, 2011	HTML	53	28	15	4	1	±0.0 pp	44,827	Election

==== Chatham-Kent—Leamington ====
Polling Firm	Last Date of Polling	Link	Cons.	NDP	Liberal	Green	Other	Margin of Error^{[1]}	Sample Size^{[2]}	Polling Method^{[3]}
Mainstreet Research	September 29, 2015	HTML	45	23	27	4	0	±3.88pp	625	IVR
2011 Election	May 2, 2011	HTML	53	27	16	3	0	±0.0 pp	46,376	Election

==== Don Valley West ====
Polling Firm	Last Date of Polling	Link	Cons.	NDP	Liberal	Green	Other	Margin of Error^{[1]}	Sample Size^{[2]}	Polling Method^{[3]}
Mainstreet Research	September 29, 2015	HTML	35	13	47	4	0	±3.72pp	688	IVR
2011 Election	May 2, 2011	HTML	44	11	41	4	0	±0.0 pp	38,984	Election

==== Eglinton—Lawrence ====
Polling Firm	Last Date of Polling	Link	Cons.	NDP	Liberal	Green	Other	Margin of Error^{[1]}	Sample Size^{[2]}	Polling Method^{[3]}
Environics	October 4, 2015	HTML	39	14	44	3	0	±3.4 pp	823	IVR
Forum Research	September 21, 2015	PDF	38	17	44	2	0	±4.0 pp	634	IVR
Environics	September 19, 2015	HTML	35	24	37	4	0	±4.1 pp	565	IVR
Environics	August 16, 2015	PDF	36	25	35	4	0	±4.0 pp	588	IVR
Forum Research	August 5, 2015	HTML	41	20	34	5	1	±4.0 pp	709	IVR
Forum Research	February 13, 2015	HTML	49	13	28	7	0	±4.0 pp	659	IVR
2011 Election	May 2, 2011	HTML	47	12	38	3	0	±0.0 pp	48,389	Election

==== Essex ====
Polling Firm	Last Date of Polling	Link	Cons.	NDP	Liberal	Green	Other	Margin of Error^{[1]}	Sample Size^{[2]}	Polling Method^{[3]}
Environics	October 4, 2015	HTML	38	37	22	4	0	±3.8 pp	655	IVR
2011 Election	May 2, 2011	HTML	48	35	14	2	0	±0.0 pp	50,219	Election

==== Etobicoke Centre ====
Polling Firm	Last Date of Polling	Link	Cons.	NDP	Liberal	Green	Other	Margin of Error^{[1]}	Sample Size^{[2]}	Polling Method^{[3]}
Forum Research	September 11, 2015	PDF	42	11	43	3	1	±3 pp	885	IVR
2011 Election	May 2, 2011	HTML	42	15	41	3	0	±0.0 pp	49,685	Election

==== Etobicoke—Lakeshore ====
Polling Firm	Last Date of Polling	Link	Cons.	NDP	Liberal	Green	Other	Margin of Error^{[1]}	Sample Size^{[2]}	Polling Method^{[3]}
Environics	October 4, 2015	HTML	36	16	43	4	0	±3.8 pp	665	IVR
Environics	September 19, 2015	HTML	38	19	40	3	0	±4.2 pp	537	IVR
Forum Research	September 17, 2015	PDF	33	22	41	4	0	±3 pp	835	IVR
Environics	August 16, 2015	PDF	31	28	36	5	0	±4.2 pp	544	IVR
2011 Election	May 2, 2011	HTML	40	20	35	4	0	±0.0 pp	50,920	Election

==== Flamborough—Glanbrook ====
Polling Firm	Last Date of Polling	Link	Cons.	NDP	Liberal	Green	Other	Margin of Error^{[1]}	Sample Size^{[2]}	Polling Method^{[3]}
Mainstreet Research	October 8, 2015	PDF	48	14	28	9	0	±3.80 pp	659	IVR
2011 Election	May 2, 2011	HTML	55	23	17	4	1	±0.0 pp	45,387	Election

==== Guelph ====
Polling Firm	Last Date of Polling	Link	Cons.	NDP	Liberal	Green	Other	Margin of Error^{[1]}	Sample Size^{[2]}	Polling Method^{[3]}
Environics	September 20, 2015	HTML	25	18	45	12	0	±4.0 pp	601	IVR
Environics	July 13, 2015	HTML	28	38	27	7	0	±4.0 pp	597	IVR
2011 Election	May 2, 2011	HTML	33	17	43	6	1	±0.0 pp	59,218	Election

==== Hamilton West—Ancaster—Dundas ====
Polling Firm	Last Date of Polling	Link	Cons.	NDP	Liberal	Green	Other	Margin of Error^{[1]}	Sample Size^{[2]}	Polling Method^{[3]}
Mainstreet Research	October 8, 2015	PDF	27	16	50	7	0	±3.76 pp	672	IVR
2011 Election	May 2, 2011	HTML	42	28	25	4	1	±0.0 pp	53,119	Election

==== Kanata—Carleton ====
Polling Firm	Last Date of Polling	Link	Cons.	NDP	Liberal	Green	Other	Margin of Error^{[1]}	Sample Size^{[2]}	Polling Method^{[3]}
Environics	October 11, 2015	PDF	39	8	50	3	0	±3.4 pp	861	IVR
Mainstreet Research	October 4, 2015	HTML	45	8	43	4	0	±3.89 pp	630	IVR
Environics	September 20, 2015	HTML	44	13	37	5	0	±4.1 pp	562	IVR
2011 Election	May 2, 2011	HTML	54	15	26	5	0	±0.0 pp	50,802	Election

==== Kenora ====
Polling Firm	Last Date of Polling	Link	Cons.	NDP	Liberal	Green	Other	Margin of Error^{[1]}	Sample Size^{[2]}	Polling Method^{[3]}
Environics	October 5, 2015	HTML	40	29	28	4	0	±3.8 pp	647	IVR
2011 Election	May 2, 2011	HTML	47	28	22	3	1	±0.0 pp	24,586	Election

==== Kingston and the Islands ====
Polling Firm	Last Date of Polling	Link	Cons.	NDP	Liberal	Green	Other	Margin of Error^{[1]}	Sample Size^{[2]}	Polling Method^{[3]}
Environics	July 13, 2015	HTML	23	37	36	5	0	±4.0 pp	563	IVR
2011 Election	May 2, 2011	HTML	34	22	40	4	0	±0.0 pp	56,663	Election

==== Kitchener Centre ====
Polling Firm	Last Date of Polling	Link	Cons.	NDP	Liberal	Green	Other	Margin of Error^{[1]}	Sample Size^{[2]}	Polling Method^{[3]}
Environics	October 11, 2015	PDF	28	22	46	4	0	±3.4 pp	856	IVR
Environics	September 20, 2015	HTML	31	30	33	7	0	±3.8 pp	672	IVR
Environics	August 16, 2015	PDF	29	33	31	7	0	±3.9 pp	625	IVR
2011 Election	May 2, 2011	HTML	40	22	32	5	1	±0.0 pp	46,998	Election

==== London North Centre ====
Polling Firm	Last Date of Polling	Link	Cons.	NDP	Liberal	Green	Other	Margin of Error^{[1]}	Sample Size^{[2]}	Polling Method^{[3]}
Environics	October 4, 2015	HTML	32	15	48	5	0	±3.8 pp	668	IVR
Environics	September 20, 2015	HTML	35	25	35	5	0	±4.2 pp	540	IVR
Environics	August 16, 2015	PDF	32	27	34	6	0	±3.7 pp	700	IVR
2011 Election	May 2, 2011	HTML	37	24	34	4	0	±0.0 pp	53,445	Election

==== London West ====
Polling Firm	Last Date of Polling	Link	Cons.	NDP	Liberal	Green	Other	Margin of Error^{[1]}	Sample Size^{[2]}	Polling Method^{[3]}
Mainstreet Research	October 8, 2015	PDF	33	19	42	6	0	±3.75 pp	678	IVR
Environics	October 4, 2015	HTML	38	20	37	5	0	±2.9 pp	1,132	IVR
2011 Election	May 2, 2011	HTML	45	25	27	3	0	±0.0 pp	58,342	Election

==== Markham—Stouffville ====
Polling Firm	Last Date of Polling	Link	Cons.	NDP	Liberal	Green	Other	Margin of Error^{[1]}	Sample Size^{[2]}	Polling Method^{[3]}
Forum Research	October 3, 2015	PDF	40	6	51	2	0	±5.0 pp	439	IVR
2011 Election	May 2, 2011	HTML	50	17	29	3	1	±0.0 pp	47,183	Election

==== Mississauga Centre ====
Polling Firm	Last Date of Polling	Link	Cons.	NDP	Liberal	Green	Other	Margin of Error^{[1]}	Sample Size^{[2]}	Polling Method^{[3]}
Forum Research	October 4, 2015	PDF	35	16	44	5	0	±5.0 pp	308	IVR
Mainstreet Research	January 28, 2014	PDF	36	20	41	3	0	±3.99 pp	600	IVR
2011 Election	May 2, 2011	HTML	42	19	37	2	0	±0.0 pp	42,677	Election

==== Mississauga East—Cooksville ====
Polling Firm	Last Date of Polling	Link	Cons.	NDP	Liberal	Green	Other	Margin of Error^{[1]}	Sample Size^{[2]}	Polling Method^{[3]}
Mainstreet Research	January 28, 2014	PDF	37	19	41	3	0	±3.99 pp	601	IVR
2011 Election	May 2, 2011	HTML	44	18	36	2	0	±0.0 pp	44,249	Election

==== Mississauga—Erin Mills ====
Polling Firm	Last Date of Polling	Link	Cons.	NDP	Liberal	Green	Other	Margin of Error^{[1]}	Sample Size^{[2]}	Polling Method^{[3]}
Mainstreet Research	January 28, 2014	PDF	41	16	39	4	0	±3.99 pp	600	IVR
2011 Election	May 2, 2011	HTML	47	16	34	3	0	±0.0 pp	46,468	Election

==== Mississauga—Lakeshore ====
Polling Firm	Last Date of Polling	Link	Cons.	NDP	Liberal	Green	Other	Margin of Error^{[1]}	Sample Size^{[2]}	Polling Method^{[3]}
Forum Research	October 4, 2015	PDF	41	12	44	3	0	±4.0 pp	538	IVR
Mainstreet Research	January 28, 2014	PDF	32	24	42	3	0	±3.99 pp	600	IVR
2011 Election	May 2, 2011	HTML	47	13	37	0	0	±0.0 pp	51,746	Election

==== Mississauga—Malton ====
Polling Firm	Last Date of Polling	Link	Cons.	NDP	Liberal	Green	Other	Margin of Error^{[1]}	Sample Size^{[2]}	Polling Method^{[3]}
Forum Research	October 2, 2015	PDF	29	20	44	5	2	±5.0 pp	335	IVR
Mainstreet Research	January 28, 2014	PDF	41	14	41	4	0	±3.99 pp	600	IVR
2011 Election	May 2, 2011	HTML	38	23	37	2	0	±0.0 pp	36,632	Election

==== Mississauga—Streetsville ====
Polling Firm	Last Date of Polling	Link	Cons.	NDP	Liberal	Green	Other	Margin of Error^{[1]}	Sample Size^{[2]}	Polling Method^{[3]}
Mainstreet Research	January 28, 2014	PDF	40	16	40	5	0	±3.99 pp	599	IVR
2011 Election	May 2, 2011	HTML	46	15	35	4	0	±0.0 pp	46,236	Election

==== Nepean ====
Polling Firm	Last Date of Polling	Link	Cons.	NDP	Liberal	Green	Other	Margin of Error^{[1]}	Sample Size^{[2]}	Polling Method^{[3]}
Environics	October 11, 2015	PDF	40	10	47	4	0	±3.2 pp	1,032	IVR
Mainstreet Research	October 4, 2015	HTML	41	13	42	4	0	±3.81 pp	655	IVR
Environics	September 20, 2015	HTML	40	19	34	8	0	±4.1 pp	569	IVR
2011 Election	May 2, 2011	HTML	51	18	27	4	0	±0.0 pp	51,130	Election

==== Niagara Falls ====
Polling Firm	Last Date of Polling	Link	Cons.	NDP	Liberal	Green	Other	Margin of Error^{[1]}	Sample Size^{[2]}	Polling Method^{[3]}
Environics	September 20, 2015	HTML	42	27	25	6	0	±4.2 pp	557	IVR
2011 Election	May 2, 2011	HTML	53	23	19	4	0	±0.0 pp	53,980	Election

==== Nickel Belt ====
Polling Firm	Last Date of Polling	Link	Cons.	NDP	Liberal	Green	Other	Margin of Error^{[1]}	Sample Size^{[2]}	Polling Method^{[3]}
Oraclepoll Research	October 8, 2015	HTML	14	46	35	5	0	±5.6 pp	300	Telephone
2011 Election	May 2, 2011	HTML	28	55	14	3	0	±0.0 pp	44,148	Election

==== Nipissing—Timiskaming ====
Polling Firm	Last Date of Polling	Link	Cons.	NDP	Liberal	Green	Other	Margin of Error^{[1]}	Sample Size^{[2]}	Polling Method^{[3]}
Oraclepoll Research	October 8, 2015	HTML	31	16	47	6	0	±5.6 pp	300	Telephone
2011 Election	May 2, 2011	HTML	36	21	37	6	0	±0.0 pp	39,174	Election

==== Oakville North—Burlington ====
Polling Firm	Last Date of Polling	Link	Cons.	NDP	Liberal	Green	Other	Margin of Error^{[1]}	Sample Size^{[2]}	Polling Method^{[3]}
Forum Research	May 12, 2014	PDF	42	8	45	3	2	±4.0 pp	530	IVR
2011 Election	May 2, 2011	HTML	54	16	27	3	0	±0.0 pp	46,840	Election

==== Orléans ====
Polling Firm	Last Date of Polling	Link	Cons.	NDP	Liberal	Green	Other	Margin of Error^{[1]}	Sample Size^{[2]}	Polling Method^{[3]}
Mainstreet Research	September 29, 2015	HTML	33	19	40	8	0	±3.8pp	660	IVR
Environics	September 20, 2015	HTML	36	11	51	3	0	±4.1 pp	567	IVR
2011 Election	May 2, 2011	HTML	45	14	38	3	0	±0.0 pp	64,007	Election

==== Ottawa Centre ====
Polling Firm	Last Date of Polling	Link	Cons.	NDP	Liberal	Green	Other	Margin of Error^{[1]}	Sample Size^{[2]}	Polling Method^{[3]}
Mainstreet Research	October 4, 2015	HTML	22	42	30	6	0	±3.79 pp	685	IVR
2011 Election	May 2, 2011	HTML	22	52	20	5	1	±0.0 pp	64,689	Election

==== Ottawa West—Nepean ====
Polling Firm	Last Date of Polling	Link	Cons.	NDP	Liberal	Green	Other	Margin of Error^{[1]}	Sample Size^{[2]}	Polling Method^{[3]}
Mainstreet Research	October 4, 2015	HTML	29	20	47	4	0	±3.72 pp	661	IVR
Forum Research	September 25, 2015	PDF	35	15	46	0	4	±3.0pp	1,083	IVR
Environics	September 20, 2015	HTML	35	20	39	5	0	±3.6 pp	747	IVR
2011 Election	May 2, 2011	HTML	45	20	31	4	0	±0.0 pp	56,602	Election

==== Perth Wellington ====
Polling Firm	Last Date of Polling	Link	Cons.	NDP	Liberal	Green	Other	Margin of Error^{[1]}	Sample Size^{[2]}	Polling Method^{[3]}
Mainstreet Research	October 8, 2015	HTML	36	21	35	8	0	±3.8 pp	652	IVR
2011 Election	May 2, 2011	HTML	54	21	18	5	2	±0.0 pp	46,401	Election

==== Peterborough—Kawartha ====
Polling Firm	Last Date of Polling	Link	Cons.	NDP	Liberal	Green	Other	Margin of Error^{[1]}	Sample Size^{[2]}	Polling Method^{[3]}
Environics	October 11, 2015	PDF	34	17	46	3	0	±3.4 pp	859	IVR
Forum Research	September 24, 2015	PDF	34	24	37	4	1	±3.0 pp	1294	IVR
Nanos Research	August 26, 2015	HTML	29	27	41	4	0	±5.7 pp	300	Telephone
2011 Election	May 2, 2011	HTML	50	25	21	4	0	±0.0 pp	57,384	Election

==== Sault Ste. Marie ====
Polling Firm	Last Date of Polling	Link	Cons.	NDP	Liberal	Green	Other	Margin of Error^{[1]}	Sample Size^{[2]}	Polling Method^{[3]}
Oraclepoll Research	October 7, 2015	HTML	36	23	35	6	0	±5.6 pp	300	Telephone
Environics	September 20, 2015	HTML	31	30	34	6	0	±3.9 pp	632	IVR
2011 Election	May 2, 2011	HTML	40	37	20	2	0	±0.0 pp	40,390	Election

==== Scarborough Centre ====
Polling Firm	Last Date of Polling	Link	Cons.	NDP	Liberal	Green	Other	Margin of Error^{[1]}	Sample Size^{[2]}	Polling Method^{[3]}
Forum Research	October 3, 2015	PDF	36	19	43	2	0	±5.0 pp	458	IVR
2011 Election	May 2, 2011	HTML	35	30	32	3	0	±0.0 pp	36,811	Election

==== Scarborough Southwest ====
Polling Firm	Last Date of Polling	Link	Cons.	NDP	Liberal	Green	Other	Margin of Error^{[1]}	Sample Size^{[2]}	Polling Method^{[3]}
Mainstreet Research	September 29, 2015	HTML	21	37	40	3	0	±3.83pp	654	IVR
Forum Research	September 22, 2015	PDF	27	32	35	5	1	±4.0 pp	608	IVR
Forum Research	April 26, 2015	HTML	20	34	42	3	1	±4.0 pp	587	IVR
Forum Research	February 13, 2015	PDF	27	29	39	4	1	±4.0 pp	557	IVR
2011 Election	May 2, 2011	HTML	32	35	29	4	0	±0.0 pp	39,379	Election

==== Spadina—Fort York ====
Polling Firm	Last Date of Polling	Link	Cons.	NDP	Liberal	Green	Other	Margin of Error^{[1]}	Sample Size^{[2]}	Polling Method^{[3]}
Forum Research	October 1, 2015	HTML	17	42	37	5	0	±5.0 pp	461	IVR
Mainstreet Research	September 14, 2015	HTML	13	45	39	3	0	±3.72 pp	671	IVR
Forum Research	August 6, 2015	PDF	10	57	28	4	1	±5.0 pp	345	IVR
Mainstreet Research	June 30, 2015	HTML	14	44	36	6	0	±3.87 pp	606	IVR
2011 Election	May 2, 2011	HTML	21	50	24	4	1	±0.0 pp	36,969	Election

==== Sudbury ====
Polling Firm	Last Date of Polling	Link	Cons.	NDP	Liberal	Green	Other	Margin of Error^{[1]}	Sample Size^{[2]}	Polling Method^{[3]}
Oraclepoll Research	October 10, 2015	HTML	27	38	31	4	0	±4.9 pp	400	Telephone
Mainstreet Research	December 21, 2014	HTML	22	29	46	3	0	±3.98 pp	602	IVR
2011 Election	May 2, 2011	HTML	28	50	18	3	1	±0.0 pp	45,441	Election

==== Timmins-James Bay ====
Polling Firm	Last Date of Polling	Link	Cons.	NDP	Liberal	Green	Other	Margin of Error^{[1]}	Sample Size^{[2]}	Polling Method^{[3]}
Oraclepoll Research	October 8, 2015	HTML	11	62	21	5	0	±5.6 pp	300	Telephone
2011 Election	May 2, 2011	HTML	32	50	16	2	0	±0.0 pp	33,706	Election

==== Toronto Centre ====
Polling Firm	Last Date of Polling	Link	Cons.	NDP	Liberal	Green	Other	Margin of Error^{[1]}	Sample Size^{[2]}	Polling Method^{[3]}
Forum Research	October 1, 2015	HTML	17	37	42	4	0	±4.0 pp	597	IVR
Forum Research	August 28, 2015	PDF	14	41	40	4	1	±4.0 pp	488	IVR
2011 Election	May 2, 2011	HTML	17	36	40	5	1	±0.0 pp	37,350	Election

==== University—Rosedale ====
Polling Firm	Last Date of Polling	Link	Cons.	NDP	Liberal	Green	Other	Margin of Error^{[1]}	Sample Size^{[2]}	Polling Method^{[3]}
Forum Research	September 30, 2015	HTML	20	39	38	3	0	±4.0 pp	604	IVR
Mainstreet Research	September 29, 2015	HTML	15	43	39	3	0	±3.84pp	644	IVR
Forum Research	August 25, 2015	PDF	17	46	32	5	0	±4.0 pp	528	IVR
2011 Election	May 2, 2011	HTML	20	44	31	5	1	±0.0 pp	46,665	Election

==== Waterloo ====
Polling Firm	Last Date of Polling	Link	Cons.	NDP	Liberal	Green	Other	Margin of Error^{[1]}	Sample Size^{[2]}	Polling Method^{[3]}
Environics	September 20, 2015	HTML	31	26	39	3	0	±3.8 pp	658	IVR
2011 Election	May 2, 2011	HTML	41	15	38	5	0	±0.0 pp	53,632	Election

==== Willowdale ====
Polling Firm	Last Date of Polling	Link	Cons.	NDP	Liberal	Green	Other	Margin of Error^{[1]}	Sample Size^{[2]}	Polling Method^{[3]}
Environics	September 20, 2015	HTML	36	15	45	5	0	±4.2 pp	535	IVR
Environics	August 17, 2015	PDF	32	26	37	5	0	±4.3 pp	508	IVR
2011 Election	May 2, 2011	HTML	41	19	39	0	0	±0.0 pp	38,984	Election

==== Windsor West ====
Polling Firm	Last Date of Polling	Link	Cons.	NDP	Liberal	Green	Other	Margin of Error^{[1]}	Sample Size^{[2]}	Polling Method^{[3]}
Mainstreet Research	July 8, 2015	HTML	21	39	37	3	0	±3.97pp	581	IVR
2011 Election	May 2, 2011	HTML	32	54	11	3	0	±0.0 pp	39,745	Election

==== York Centre ====
Polling Firm	Last Date of Polling	Link	Cons.	NDP	Liberal	Green	Other	Margin of Error^{[1]}	Sample Size^{[2]}	Polling Method^{[3]}
Forum Research	October 4, 2015	PDF	40	17	39	3	2	±5.0 pp	387	IVR
2011 Election	May 2, 2011	HTML	49	16	33	2	0	±0.0 pp	35,546	Election

=== Quebec ===
==== Ahuntsic-Cartierville ====
Polling Firm	Last Date of Polling	Link	Cons.	NDP	Liberal	BQ	Green	Other	Margin of Error^{[1]}	Sample Size^{[2]}	Polling Method^{[3]}
Mainstreet Research	September 21, 2015	HTML	13	37	34	13	3	0	±3.7 pp	698	IVR
Mainstreet Research	December 7, 2013	PDF	6	13	45	31	4	0	±3.8 pp	661	IVR
2011 Election	May 2, 2011	HTML	9	30	31	28	1	1	±0.0 pp	48,602	Election

==== Chicoutimi—Le Fjord ====
Polling Firm	Last Date of Polling	Link	Cons.	NDP	Liberal	BQ	Green	Other	Margin of Error^{[1]}	Sample Size^{[2]}	Polling Method^{[3]}
Segma Research	October 12, 2015	HTML	19.7	33.1	22.3	22.1	2.8				
Segma Research	September 19, 2015	HTML	17.0	41.2	18.9	17.8	5.1				
2011 Election	May 2, 2011	HTML	25.6	37.7	5.8	28.9	1.5	0.7	±0.0 pp	43,094	Election

==== Jonquière ====
Polling Firm	Last Date of Polling	Link	Cons.	NDP	Liberal	BQ	Green	Other	Margin of Error^{[1]}	Sample Size^{[2]}	Polling Method^{[3]}
Segma Research	October 12, 2015	HTML	20.3	33.0	23.8	19.2	2.9	0.8			
Segma Research	September 19, 2015	HTML	20.1	37.1	18.0	20.0	4.8				
2011 Election	May 2, 2011	HTML	34	43	3	19	1	0	±0.0 pp	46,657	Election

==== Lac-Saint-Jean ====
Polling Firm	Last Date of Polling	Link	Cons.	NDP	Liberal	BQ	Green	Other	Margin of Error^{[1]}	Sample Size^{[2]}	Polling Method^{[3]}
Segma Research	October 12, 2015	HTML	34.6	29.6	15.8	17.2	2.9	0			
Segma Research	September 19, 2015	HTML	34.7	29.4	10.6	20.6	4.7	0			
2011 Election	May 2, 2011	HTML	42	32	3	21	1	0	±0.0 pp	54,920	Election

==== Laurier—Sainte-Marie ====
Polling Firm	Last Date of Polling	Link	Cons.	NDP	Liberal	BQ	Green	Other	Margin of Error^{[1]}	Sample Size^{[2]}	Polling Method^{[3]}
CROP	August 29, 2015	HTML	2	57	15	20	4	2	±5.0 pp	377	Telephone
Mainstreet Research	December 7, 2013	PDF	6	32	26	36	1	0	±3.82 pp	653	IVR
2011 Election	May 2, 2011	HTML	4	46	11	35	3	1	±0.0 pp	51,102	Election

==== Montarville ====
Polling Firm	Last Date of Polling	Link	Cons.	NDP	Liberal	BQ	Green	Other	Margin of Error^{[1]}	Sample Size^{[2]}	Polling Method^{[3]}
Solutions Logik	September 25, 2015	HTML	9	28	14	46	3	0			
2011 Election	May 2, 2011	HTML	10	45	13	29	2	2	±0.0 pp	52,165	Election

==== Mount Royal ====
Polling Firm	Last Date of Polling	Link	Cons.	NDP	Liberal	BQ	Green	Other	Margin of Error^{[1]}	Sample Size^{[2]}	Polling Method^{[3]}
Mainstreet Research	September 21, 2015	HTML	27	16	50	7	2	0	±3.76 pp	672	IVR
Mainstreet Research	December 7, 2013	PDF	16	15	56	7	6	0	±3.93 pp	618	IVR
2011 Election	May 2, 2011	HTML	36	18	41	3	2	0	±0.0 pp	39,007	Election

==== Notre-Dame-de-Grâce—Westmount ====
Polling Firm	Last Date of Polling	Link	Cons.	NDP	Liberal	BQ	Green	Other	Margin of Error^{[1]}	Sample Size^{[2]}	Polling Method^{[3]}
Mainstreet Research	October 4, 2015	HTML	10	33	40	7	10	0		665	IVR
Mainstreet Research	December 7, 2013	PDF	13	22	52	10	3	0	±3.9 pp	626	IVR
2011 Election	May 2, 2011	HTML	18	35	38	4	4	1	±0.0 pp	44,642	Election

==== Papineau ====
Polling Firm	Last Date of Polling	Link	Cons.	NDP	Liberal	BQ	Green	Other	Margin of Error^{[1]}	Sample Size^{[2]}	Polling Method^{[3]}
Mainstreet Research	September 17, 2015	HTML	11	36	41	12	0	0	±3.49 pp	783	IVR
CROP	September 14, 2015	HTML	5	46	35	10	4	0	±5.06 pp	375	Telephone
Mainstreet Research	December 7, 2013	PDF	5	14	61	20	0	0	±4.13 pp	560	IVR
2011 Election	May 2, 2011	HTML	5	29	38	25	2	1	±0.0 pp	45,887	Election

==== Pontiac ====
Polling Firm	Last Date of Polling	Link	Cons.	NDP	Liberal	BQ	Green	Other	Margin of Error^{[1]}	Sample Size^{[2]}	Polling Method^{[3]}
Mainstreet Research	October 4, 2015	HTML	19	36	34	8	3	0	±3.74 pp	673	IVR
2011 Election	May 2, 2011	HTML	26	47	15	10	2	0	±0.0 pp	35,508	Election

==== Richmond—Arthabaska ====
Polling Firm	Last Date of Polling	Link	Cons.	NDP	Liberal	BQ	Green	Other	Margin of Error^{[1]}	Sample Size^{[2]}	Polling Method^{[3]}
Mainstreet Research	September 21, 2015	HTML	46	35	7	10	2	0	±3.77 pp	668	IVR
2011 Election	May 2, 2011	HTML	25	32	7	34	2	0	±0.0 pp	53,303	Election

=== Saskatchewan ===
==== Regina—Lewvan ====
Polling Firm	Last Date of Polling	Link	Cons.	NDP	Liberal	Green	Other	Margin of Error^{[1]}	Sample Size^{[2]}	Polling Method^{[3]}
Mainstreet Research	September 21, 2015	HTML	40	34	21	5	0	±3.85 pp	639	IVR
2011 Election	May 2, 2011	HTML	44	45	8	3	0	±0.0 pp	38,508	Election

==== Saskatoon—University ====
Polling Firm	Last Date of Polling	Link	Cons.	NDP	Liberal	Green	Other	Margin of Error^{[1]}	Sample Size^{[2]}	Polling Method^{[3]}
Environics	September 20, 2015	HTML	37	37	22	4	0	±3.4 pp	853	IVR
Environics	August 16, 2015	PDF	34	41	22	4	0	±3.7 pp	691	IVR
2011 Election	May 2, 2011	HTML	49	38	10	3	1	±0.0 pp	35,122	Election

==== Saskatoon West ====
Polling Firm	Last Date of Polling	Link	Cons.	NDP	Liberal	Green	Other	Margin of Error^{[1]}	Sample Size^{[2]}	Polling Method^{[3]}
Mainstreet Research	September 21, 2015	HTML	31	36	25	9	0	±3.83 pp	658	IVR
2011 Election	May 2, 2011	HTML	43	51	4	3	0	±0.0 pp	30,459	Election

=== Yukon ===
==== Yukon ====
Polling Firm	Last Date of Polling	Link	Cons.	NDP	Liberal	Green	Other	Margin of Error^{[1]}	Sample Size^{[2]}	Polling Method^{[3]}
Environics	September 21, 2015	HTML	27	29	39	4	0	±4.4 pp	497	IVR
2011 Election	May 2, 2011	HTML	34	14	33	19	0	±0.0 pp	16,057	Election

== See also ==
- Opinion polling in the Canadian federal election, 2015

== Notes ==
Notes

^{1} In cases when linked poll details distinguish between the margin of error associated with the total sample of respondents (including undecided and non-voters) and that of the subsample of decided/leaning voters, the latter is included in the table. Also not included is the margin of error created by rounding to the nearest whole number or any margin of error from methodological sources. Most online polls—because of their opt-in method of recruiting panellists which results in a non-random sample—cannot have a margin of error. In such cases, shown is what the margin of error would be for a survey using a random probability-based sample of equivalent size.
^{2} Refers to the total sample size, including undecided and non-voters.
^{3} "Telephone" refers to traditional telephone polls conducted by live interviewers; "IVR" refers to automated Interactive Voice Response polls conducted by telephone; "online" refers to polls conducted exclusively over the internet; "telephone/online" refers to polls which combine results from both telephone and online surveys, or for which respondents are initially recruited by telephone and then asked to complete an online survey.
^{4} Election Results shown for 2011 are the redistributed results for the 2015 districts. These are fixed until 2023 under the present federal electoral system. About 80% of the 308 districts defined in 2003 changed their borders or are entirely new: 338 districts were defined in 2015.
