= Mainstreet Research =

Market research firm

Mainstreet Research is a Canadian market research and polling firm founded in 2010 by Quito Maggi, who currently serves as its president. Maggi, who ran campaigns within the Liberal parties in Canada, has also co-founded Political Intelligence, a lobbying firm. The company has headquarters in Toronto, and offices in Montreal and Ottawa.

Mainstreet Research conducts regular Canadian national, regional, and municipal public polling and private market and public opinion research. They also have equity in iPolitics, a digital news outlet.

== Polling ==
Mainstreet Research published its first poll on December 9, 2013. Since then, Mainstreet Research (formerly Mainstreet Technologies) has published hundreds of polls across dozens of elections and in between elections on matters of public policy. A summary of the elections covered by Mainstreet can be found below.

- 2015 Alberta General Election
- 2015 Canada General Election
- Opinion polling for the 2015 Canadian federal election by constituency
- 2015 Progressive Conservative Party of Ontario leadership election
- 2016 Manitoba general election
- 2016 Saskatchewan general election
- 2017 Nova Scotia general election
- 2017 British Columbia general election
- 2018 Progressive Conservative Party of Ontario leadership election
- 2018 New Brunswick general election
- 2018 Ontario general election
- 2018 Quebec general election
- 2018 Peel Region municipal elections
- 2018 Toronto mayoral election
- 2019 Manitoba general election
- 2019 Newfoundland and Labrador general election
- 2019 Prince Edward Island general election
- 2019 Alberta general election
- 2019 Canadian federal election
- Opinion polling for the 2019 Canadian federal election by constituency
- 2020 New Brunswick general election
- 2020 Saskatchewan general election
- 2020 British Columbia general election
- 2021 Nova Scotia general election
- 2021 Canadian federal election
- Opinion polling for the 2021 Canadian federal election by constituency
- 2021 Montreal municipal election
- 2022 Ontario general election
- 2022 Quebec general election

== Polling accuracy ==
The polling firm drew criticism for incorrectly calling the 2017 Calgary municipal election in polls conducted for Postmedia. The polls suggested that incumbent Naheed Nenshi was trailing to Bill Smith, a political newcomer, while other pollsters had Nenshi in the lead. A report commissioned after the election by the Market Research and Intelligence Association (MRIA) found that there were flaws in the company's polling methods, one of which resulted in the exclusion of cellphones in polling calls. This led to sampling bias, as younger people tended to have cellphones, but not landlines. It was found that the pollster's attempts to conduct ward-by-ward polling was based on phone numbers linked to postal codes, while cellphones with no such linkage were often dropped. Mainstreet Research president Quito Maggi later admitted to "big, big polling failures", and stated that while the company has implemented recommendations from the report, it would have to work to earn back public trust.

A similar problem was also reported in the company's polls for the 2019 Nanaimo provincial by-election, which mispredicted a win for the BC Liberals over the incumbent BC NDP. Christopher Adams, one of the authors of the report, recommended that such small sample polling be halted until a solution to the sampling problem was found, adding that Mainstreet had done well with larger samples such as with provincial or federal elections. In a comparison of polling results with election results, Mainstreet is ranked an A− in Canada by polling analyst Philippe J. Fournier.
