= Opinion polling for the 2019 Canadian federal election by constituency =

Various polling organizations have been conducting opinion polling in specific ridings in the lead up to the 2019 Canadian federal election. The results of publicized opinion polling for individual constituencies are detailed in this article.

Opinion polls have been conducted from the months following the previous general election held in October 2015, and have increased in frequency leading up to the October 2019 general election.

Given the expense of polling individual constituencies, constituencies are usually only polled if they are of some particular interest, e.g. they are thought to be marginal or facing an impending by-election. The constituencies polled are not necessarily representative of a national average swing. Under the first-past-the-post electoral system the true marginal seats, by definition, will be decisive as to the outcome of the election.

== Constituency polls ==
=== Alberta ===
==== Edmonton Mill Woods ====
Polling Firm	Last Date of Polling	Link	Liberal	Cons.	NDP	Green	PPC	Other	Margin of Error^{[1]}	Sample Size^{[2]}	Polling Method^{[3]}
Mainstreet Research	September 16, 2019	HTML	32.6	40.6	13.5	9.0	3.8	0.7	±3.93 pp	623	IVR
2015 Election	October 19, 2015	HTML	41.2	41.0	12.7	2.2	0	1.1	±0.0 pp	49,744	Election

==== Edmonton Strathcona ====
Polling Firm	Last Date of Polling	Link	Liberal	Cons.	NDP	Green	PPC	Other	Margin of Error^{[1]}	Sample Size^{[2]}	Polling Method^{[3]}
Mainstreet Research	September 20, 2019	HTML	27.7	37.9	23.6	5.8	2.9	2.1	±4.00 pp	623	IVR
2015 Election	October 19, 2015	HTML	20.7	31.2	43.9	2.3	-	0.5	±0.0 pp	55,821	Election

=== British Columbia ===
==== Burnaby South ====
Polling Firm	Last Date of Polling	Link	Liberal	Cons.	NDP	Green	PPC	Other	Margin of Error^{[1]}	Sample Size^{[2]}	Polling Method^{[3]}
2019 By-election	February 25, 2019	HTML	26.02	22.63	38.90	0	10.65	1.80	±0.0 pp	22,746	Election
Mainstreet Research	January 10, 2019	HTML	26.3	22.0	38.8	0	8.7	4.2	±3.6 pp	740	IVR
Mainstreet Research	November 11, 2018	HTML	35.9	29.3	27.2	6.1	1.0	0.5	±5.12 pp	366	IVR
2015 Election	October 19, 2015	HTML	34	27	35	3	0	1	±0.0 pp	46,162	Election

==== Fleetwood—Port Kells ====
Polling Firm	Last Date of Polling	Link	Liberal	Cons.	NDP	Green	PPC	Other	Margin of Error^{[1]}	Sample Size^{[2]}	Polling Method^{[3]}
Mainstreet Research	September 29, 2019	HTML	39.7	38.0	7.2	7.1	5.3	0	±3.83 pp	654	IVR
2015 Election	October 19, 2015	HTML	46	29	21	2	0	0	±0.0 pp	49,302	Election

==== Kamloops—Thompson—Cariboo ====
Polling Firm	Last Date of Polling	Link	Liberal	Cons.	NDP	Green	PPC	Other	Margin of Error^{[1]}	Sample Size^{[2]}	Polling Method^{[3]}
Mainstreet Research	September 25, 2019	HTML	24.4	38.5	10.1	14.6	4.5	0	±3.47 pp	796	IVR
2015 Election	October 19, 2015	HTML	30.4	35.2	30.7	3.5	-	0	±0.0 pp	69,939	Election

==== Vancouver East ====
Polling Firm	Last Date of Polling	Link	Liberal	Cons.	NDP	Green	PPC	Other	Margin of Error^{[1]}	Sample Size^{[2]}	Polling Method^{[3]}
Mainstreet Research	September 29, 2019	HTML	25.3	16.3	37.0	15.9	2.0	-	±3.02 pp	624	IVR
2015 Election	October 19, 2015	HTML	28	11	50	9	-	-	±0.0 pp	59,113	Election

==== Vancouver Granville ====
Polling Firm	Last Date of Polling	Link	Liberal	Cons.	NDP	Green	PPC	Wilson-Raybould	Other	Margin of Error^{[1]}	Sample Size^{[2]}	Polling Method^{[3]}
Mainstreet Research	October 15, 2019	HTML	28.3	22.3	-	-	-	32.8	-	±3.94 pp	620	IVR^{[6]}
Mainstreet Research	September 24, 2019	HTML	30.2	23.3	7.7	6.5	0.9	26.9	-	±4.03 pp	592	IVR^{[6]}
Justason Marketing	September 5, 2019	PDF	27	15	6	12	-	37	-	±5.1 pp	361	IVR
Mainstreet Research	August 28, 2019	Twitter	40.3	18.4	9.2	10.2	3.8	-	17.6	±4.4 pp	493	IVR^{[5]}
Mainstreet Research	August 28, 2019	Twitter	31.9	17.1	7.9	10.4	3.9	28.8	-	±4.4 pp	493	IVR^{[6]}
Mainstreet Research	May 30, 2019	PDF	29.2	19.9	8.4	10.2	0	32.3	0	±4.79 pp	418	IVR
Justason Marketing	April 5, 2019	PDF	24	14	23	0	0	33	7	±7 pp	195	IVR
2015 Election	October 19, 2015	HTML	44	26	27	3	0	0	0	±0.0 pp	54,010	Election

==== Victoria ====
Polling Firm	Last Date of Polling	Link	Liberal	Cons.	NDP	Green	PPC	Other	Margin of Error^{[1]}	Sample Size^{[2]}	Polling Method^{[3]}
Mainstreet Research	August 10, 2019	Twitter	27.1	17.2	22.2	28.3	3.5	0	±4.1 pp	575	IVR
2015 Election	October 19, 2015	HTML	11.8	11.7	42.8	32.9	0	1	±0.0 pp	72,136	Election

=== Manitoba ===
==== Elmwood—Transcona ====
Polling Firm	Last Date of Polling	Link	Liberal	Cons.	NDP	Green	PPC	Other	Margin of Error^{[1]}	Sample Size^{[2]}	Polling Method^{[3]}
Mainstreet Research	September 24, 2019	HTML	26.0	41.0	20.1	8.8	1.6	0	±3.94 pp	617	IVR
2015 Election	October 19, 2015	HTML	29.5	34.0	34.1	2.3	-	-	±0.0 pp	43,268	Election

=== Nova Scotia ===
==== Central Nova ====
Polling Firm	Last Date of Polling	Link	Liberal	Cons.	NDP	Green	PPC	Other	Margin of Error^{[1]}	Sample Size^{[2]}	Polling Method^{[3]}
Mainstreet Research	September 20, 2019	HTML	41.0	38.3	8.7	11.1	0.7	-	±4.46 pp	598	IVR
2015 Election	October 19, 2015	HTML	58.5	25.8	10.2	4.1	0	1.2	±0.0 pp	44,496	Election

==== Cumberland—Colchester ====
Polling Firm	Last Date of Polling	Link	Liberal	Cons.	NDP	Green	PPC	Other	Margin of Error^{[1]}	Sample Size^{[2]}	Polling Method^{[3]}
Mainstreet Research	September 26, 2019	HTML	39.0	35.8	4.5	15.1	1.8	-	±3.47 pp	616	IVR
2015 Election	October 19, 2015	HTML	63	26	5	3	0	0	±0.0 pp	46,510	Election

==== Sackville—Preston—Chezzetcook ====
Polling Firm	Last Date of Polling	Link	Liberal	Cons.	NDP	Green	PPC	Other	Margin of Error^{[1]}	Sample Size^{[2]}	Polling Method^{[3]}
Mainstreet Research	September 14, 2019	HTML	38.9	26.7	14.3	17.1	2.4	0.6	±4.46pp	452	IVR
2015 Election	October 19, 2015	HTML	48	15	34	3	0	0	±0.0 pp	48,451	Election

=== Ontario ===
==== Barrie—Springwater—Oro-Medonte ====
Polling Firm	Last Date of Polling	Link	Liberal	Cons.	NDP	Green	PPC	Other	Margin of Error^{[1]}	Sample Size^{[2]}	Polling Method^{[3]}
Mainstreet Research	September 20, 2019	HTML	31.6	39.7	8.0	15.3	3.7	-	±3.94 pp	620	IVR
2015 Election	October 19, 2015	HTML	41.5	41.7	10.2	5.2	0	0.7	±0.0 pp	50,716	Election

==== Chatham—Kent-Leamington ====
Polling Firm	Last Date of Polling	Link	Liberal	Cons.	NDP	Green	PPC	Other	Margin of Error^{[1]}	Sample Size^{[2]}	Polling Method^{[3]}
Mainstreet Research	September 22, 2019	HTML	34.8	49.4	9.8	2.2	1.7	-	±4.58 pp	458	IVR
2015 Election	October 19, 2015	HTML	37.2	41.7	18.3	2.6	0	0	±0.0 pp	52,234	Election

==== Durham ====
Polling Firm	Last Date of Polling	Link	Liberal	Cons.	NDP	Green	PPC	Other	Margin of Error^{[1]}	Sample Size^{[2]}	Polling Method^{[3]}
Mainstreet Research	September 20, 2019	HTML	35.4	43.1	8.5	6.7	4.3	-	±3.94 pp	620	IVR
2015 Election	October 19, 2015	HTML	35.7	45.1	16.0	2.5	0	0.5	±0.0 pp	64,418	Election

==== Guelph ====
Polling Firm	Last Date of Polling	Link	Liberal	Cons.	NDP	Green	PPC	Other	Margin of Error^{[1]}	Sample Size^{[2]}	Polling Method^{[3]}
Mainstreet Research	September 30, 2019	HTML	44.1	21.9	6.2	23.3	3.8	-	±3.99 pp	630	IVR
2015 Election	October 19, 2015	HTML	49	26	12	11	0	1	±0.0 pp	54,682	Election

==== Kitchener Centre ====
Polling Firm	Last Date of Polling	Link	Liberal	Cons.	NDP	Green	PPC	Other	Margin of Error^{[1]}	Sample Size^{[2]}	Polling Method^{[3]}
Oraclepoll Research	October 8, 2019	PDF	43	23	6	26	2	-	±4.4 pp	500	IVR
2015 Election	October 19, 2015	HTML	48.8	30.4	16.6	3.1	0	1.2	±0.0 pp	52,572	Election

==== Markham—Stouffville ====
Polling Firm	Last Date of Polling	Link	Liberal	Cons.	NDP	Green	Philpott	Other	Margin of Error^{[1]}	Sample Size^{[2]}	Polling Method^{[3]}
Mainstreet Research	May 30, 2019	PDF	38.9	32.2	2.4	5.7	20.8	0	±3.99 pp	601	IVR
2015 Election	October 19, 2015	HTML	49	43	6	2	0	0	±0.0 pp	59,962	Election

==== Milton ====
Polling Firm	Last Date of Polling	Link	Liberal	Cons.	NDP	Green	PPC	Other	Margin of Error^{[1]}	Sample Size^{[2]}	Polling Method^{[3]}
Mainstreet Research	September 30, 2019	HTML	39.8	38.8	4.3	10.3	3.6	0	±4.08 pp	588	IVR
2015 Election	October 19, 2015	HTML	40	45	10	2	-	1	±0.0 pp	49,518	Election

==== Niagara Centre ====
Polling Firm	Last Date of Polling	Link	Liberal	Cons.	NDP	Green	PPC	Other	Margin of Error^{[1]}	Sample Size^{[2]}	Polling Method^{[3]}
Mainstreet Research	July 16, 2019	HTML	43.7	31.3	17.1	5.6	1.2	1.2	±4.46 pp	482	IVR
2015 Election	October 19, 2015	HTML	36	30	32	2	0	1	±0.0 pp	54,682	Election

==== Oakville ====
Polling Firm	Last Date of Polling	Link	Liberal	Cons.	NDP	Green	PPC	Other	Margin of Error^{[1]}	Sample Size^{[2]}	Polling Method^{[3]}
Mainstreet Research	May 30, 2019	HTML	48.3	35.4	3.0	8.3	3.5	0	±3.99 pp	602	IVR
2015 Election	October 19, 2015	HTML	49	42	6	2	0	0.4	±0.0 pp	64,704	Election

==== Ottawa Centre ====
Polling Firm	Last Date of Polling	Link	Liberal	Cons.	NDP	Green	PPC	Other	Margin of Error^{[1]}	Sample Size^{[2]}	Polling Method^{[3]}
Mainstreet Research	September 15, 2019	HTML	45.6	22.7	15.7	11.3	2.7	-	±3.71 pp	699	IVR
2015 Election	October 19, 2015	HTML	42.6	14.4	38.5	2.9	0	1.0	±0.0 pp	75,886	Election

==== Scarborough Centre ====
Polling Firm	Last Date of Polling	Link	Liberal	Cons.	NDP	Green	PPC	Other	Margin of Error^{[1]}	Sample Size^{[2]}	Polling Method^{[3]}
Mainstreet Research	September 29, 2019	HTML	53.2	22.2	4.7	12.7	3.5	3.7	N/A	627	IVR
2015 Election	October 19, 2015	HTML	50.5	32.7	11.6	2.1	0	3.1	±0.0 pp	45,436	Election

==== Simcoe North ====
Polling Firm	Last Date of Polling	Link	Liberal	Cons.	NDP	Green	PPC	Other	Margin of Error^{[1]}	Sample Size^{[2]}	Polling Method^{[3]}
Mainstreet Research	September 20, 2019	HTML	36.1	39.6	5.5	15.3	2.1	1.5	±3.77 pp	674	IVR
2015 Election	October 19, 2015	HTML	39.8	43.5	10.5	4.6	0	1.5	±0.0 pp	57,260	Election

==== Waterloo ====
Polling Firm	Last Date of Polling	Link	Liberal	Cons.	NDP	Green	PPC	Other	Margin of Error^{[1]}	Sample Size^{[2]}	Polling Method^{[3]}
Mainstreet Research	September 20, 2019	HTML	49.5	23.7	8.8	13.5	2.7	-	±4.00 pp	606	IVR
2015 Election	October 19, 2015	HTML	49.7	32.3	14.9	2.9	0	0.2	±0.0 pp	59,849	Election

==== Whitby ====
Polling Firm	Last Date of Polling	Link	Liberal	Cons.	NDP	Green	PPC	Other	Margin of Error^{[1]}	Sample Size^{[2]}	Polling Method^{[3]}
Mainstreet Research	September 22, 2019	HTML	39.7	39.1	6.2	8.7	3.9	0	±3.96 pp	611	IVR
Mainstreet Research	July 19, 2019	HTML	39.7	41	5	10	4	0.4	±4.00 pp	600	IVR
2015 Election	October 19, 2015	HTML	45.0	42.1	10.3	2.2	0	0.4	±0.0 pp	64,516	Election

==== Windsor West ====
Polling Firm	Last Date of Polling	Link	Liberal	Cons.	NDP	Green	PPC	Other	Margin of Error^{[1]}	Sample Size^{[2]}	Polling Method^{[3]}
Mainstreet Research	August 21, 2019	HTML	37.6	21.3	36.3	2.9	1.9	-	±4.53 pp	468	IVR
2015 Election	October 19, 2015	HTML	25.2	20.8	51.3	2.3	0	0.3	±0.0 pp	86,166	Election

=== Prince Edward Island ===
==== Charlottetown ====
Polling Firm	Last Date of Polling	Link	Liberal	Cons.	NDP	Green	PPC	Other	Margin of Error^{[1]}	Sample Size^{[2]}	Polling Method^{[3]}
Mainstreet Research	September 20, 2019	HTML	41.3	28.7	7.4	17.0	1.2	4.3	±3.91 pp	628	IVR
2015 Election	October 19, 2015	HTML	56.2	14.8	23.1	5.7	0	0	±0.0 pp	21,264	Election

=== Quebec ===
==== Beauce ====
Polling Firm	Last Date of Polling	Link	Liberal	Cons.	NDP	Bloc	Green	PPC	Other	Margin of Error^{[1]}	Sample Size^{[2]}	Polling Method^{[3]}
Mainstreet Research	October 9, 2019	HTML	15	31	2	13	4	29	-	±3.9 pp	625	IVR
Mainstreet Research	August 5, 2019	HTML	19.3	33.5	1.9	5.8	3.7	33	1.8	±3.87 pp	640	IVR
Mainstreet Research	November 11, 2018	HTML	13.8	37.9	5.5	4.4	2.0	34.7	1.8	±3.95 pp	616	IVR
2015 Election	October 19, 2015	HTML	22	59	10	7	2	N/A	0	±0.0 pp	56,594	Election

==== Beauport-Limoilou ====
Polling Firm	Last Date of Polling	Link	Liberal	Cons.	NDP	Bloc	Green	PPC	Other	Margin of Error^{[1]}	Sample Size^{[2]}	Polling Method^{[3]}
Mainstreet Research	September 30, 2019	HTML	30	32	6	20	7	3	-	±3.9 pp	623	IVR
2015 Election	October 19, 2015	HTML	25.4	30.6	25.5	14.8	2.4	N/A	1.3	±0.0 pp	51,449	Election

==== Bécancour—Nicolet—Saurel ====
Polling Firm	Last Date of Polling	Link	Liberal	Cons.	NDP	Bloc	Green	PPC	Other	Margin of Error^{[1]}	Sample Size^{[2]}	Polling Method^{[3]}
Mainstreet Research	September 12, 2019	HTML	31.1	20.4	4	37.6	3.1	0.9	-	±3.66 pp	716	IVR
2015 Election	October 19, 2015	HTML	24.3	11.4	22.1	40.0	2.3	N/A	-	±0.0 pp	53,163	Election

==== Beloeil-Chambly ====
Polling Firm	Last Date of Polling	Link	Liberal	Cons.	NDP	Bloc	Green	PPC	Other	Margin of Error^{[1]}	Sample Size^{[2]}	Polling Method^{[3]}
Mainstreet Research	September 29, 2019	HTML	25	9	18	39	6	2	2	±3.97	609	IVR
Mainstreet Research	September 3, 2019	HTML	35	15	8	26	9	-	-	pp	825	IVR
2015 Election	October 19, 2015	HTML	29.3	9.3	31.1	27.7	2.3	N/A	0.4	±0.0 pp	66,438	Election

==== Berthier—Maskinongé ====
Polling Firm	Last Date of Polling	Link	Liberal	Cons.	NDP	Bloc	Green	PPC	Other	Margin of Error^{[1]}	Sample Size^{[2]}	Polling Method^{[3]}
Mainstreet Research	September 26, 2019	HTML	16.1	14.6	35.5	27.8	2.3	1.8	-	±4.00 pp	600	IVR
2015 Election	October 19, 2015	HTML	20.2	10.2	42.1	25.8	1.5	-	-	±0.0 pp	55,250	Election

==== Jonquière ====
Polling Firm	Last Date of Polling	Link	Liberal	Cons.	NDP	Bloc	Green	PPC	Other	Margin of Error^{[1]}	Sample Size^{[2]}	Polling Method^{[3]}
Mainstreet Research	October 9, 2019	HTML	14.9	20.3	24.7	34.2	2.5	2.0	-	±3.89 pp	634	IVR
Mainstreet Research	September 14, 2019	HTML	27	29	13	19	6	3	-	±3.55 pp	674	IVR
2015 Election	October 19, 2015	HTML	28.5	16.9	29.2	23.3	1.4	-	0.8	±0.0 pp	49,002	Election

==== Laurier—Sainte-Marie ====
Polling Firm	Last Date of Polling	Link	Liberal	Cons.	NDP	Bloc	Green	PPC	Other	Margin of Error^{[1]}	Sample Size^{[2]}	Polling Method^{[3]}
Mainstreet Research	October 16, 2019	HTML	35	2	16	40	3	2	-	±3.9 pp	628	IVR
Mainstreet Research	September 3, 2019	HTML	41.0	3.7	12.8	26.8	8.4	4.0	-	±3.95 pp	615	IVR
2015 Election	October 19, 2015	HTML	23	4	38	28	3	-	1	±0.0 pp	66,438	Election

==== Longueuil—Saint-Hubert ====
Polling Firm	Last Date of Polling	Link	Liberal	Cons.	NDP	Bloc	Green	PPC	Other	Margin of Error^{[1]}	Sample Size^{[2]}	Polling Method^{[3]}
Mainstreet Research	September 29, 2019	HTML	35.0	9.0	5.0	28.0	17.0	3.0	-	±4 pp	556	IVR
2015 Election	October 19, 2015	HTML	30.0	8.7	31.2	27.3	2.5	-	0.3	±0.0 pp	59,138	Election

==== Louis-Hébert ====
Polling Firm	Last Date of Polling	Link	Liberal	Cons.	NDP	Bloc	Green	PPC	Other	Margin of Error^{[1]}	Sample Size^{[2]}	Polling Method^{[3]}
Mainstreet Research	September 3, 2019	HTML	40	19	5	19	8	4	-	3.3 pp	864	IVR
2015 Election	October 19, 2015	HTML	34.9	27.2	20.8	14.4	2.5	-	0.2	±0.0 pp	61,744	Election

==== Montmagny—L'Islet—Kamouraska—Rivière-du-Loup ====
Polling Firm	Last Date of Polling	Link	Liberal	Cons.	NDP	Bloc	Green	PPC	Other	Margin of Error^{[1]}	Sample Size^{[2]}	Polling Method^{[3]}
Mainstreet Research	October 5, 2019	HTML	23.6	29.3	8	28.9	6	4	-	±4 pp	586	IVR
2015 Election	October 19, 2015	HTML	28.4	29.0	24.2	16.1	1.7	-	0.6	±0.0 pp	50,020	Election

==== Portneuf—Jacques-Cartier ====
Polling Firm	Last Date of Polling	Link	Liberal	Cons.	NDP	Bloc	Green	PPC	Other	Margin of Error^{[1]}	Sample Size^{[2]}	Polling Method^{[3]}
Mainstreet Research	September 13, 2019	HTML	22	48	4	12	7	4	2	±3.5 pp	625	IVR
2015 Election	October 19, 2015	HTML	21.5	44.0	22.1	10.7	1.8	-	0	±0.0 pp	62,059	Election

==== Québec ====
Polling Firm	Last Date of Polling	Link	Liberal	Cons.	NDP	Bloc	Green	PPC	Other	Margin of Error^{[1]}	Sample Size^{[2]}	Polling Method^{[3]}
Mainstreet Research	October 19, 2019	HTML	39	17	8	27	6					
Mainstreet Research	July 24, 2019	HTML	33.1	25.2	8.1	21.4	7.7	3	1.6	±3.7 pp	684	IVR
2015 Election	October 19, 2015	HTML	29	22	27	19	3	0	1	±0.0 pp	54,687	Election

==== Rosemont-La Petite-Patrie ====
Polling Firm	Last Date of Polling	Link	Liberal	Cons.	NDP	Bloc	Green	PPC	Other	Margin of Error^{[1]}	Sample Size^{[2]}	Polling Method^{[3]}
Mainstreet Research	October 1, 2019	HTML	22	6.1	35.4	26	6.2	2.6	1.6	±3.96 pp	613	IVR
2015 Election	October 19, 2015	HTML	20.7	4.3	49.2	21.1	3.1	0	1.7	±0.0 pp	54,349	Election

== Notes ==
Notes

^{1} In cases when linked poll details distinguish between the margin of error associated with the total sample of respondents (including undecided and non-voters) and that of the subsample of decided/leaning voters, the latter is included in the table. Also not included is the margin of error created by rounding to the nearest whole number or any margin of error from methodological sources. Most online polls—because of their opt-in method of recruiting panellists which results in a non-random sample—cannot have a margin of error. In such cases, shown is what the margin of error would be for a survey using a random probability-based sample of equivalent size.
^{2} Refers to the total sample size, including undecided and non-voters.
^{3} "Telephone" refers to traditional telephone polls conducted by live interviewers; "IVR" refers to automated Interactive Voice Response polls conducted by telephone; "online" refers to polls conducted exclusively over the internet; "telephone/online" refers to polls which combine results from both telephone and online surveys, or for which respondents are initially recruited by telephone and then asked to complete an online survey.
^{4} Election Results shown for 2011 are the redistributed results for the 2015 districts. These are fixed until 2023 under the present federal electoral system. About 80% of the 308 districts defined in 2003 changed their borders or are entirely new: 338 districts were defined in 2015.
^{5} Naming party only.
^{6} Naming candidates.
