= CROP (polling firm) =

CROP Inc. is a Canadian polling and market research firm based in Montreal, Quebec, Canada. The company was founded in 1965 by Yvan Corbeil, who saw a disconnect between Toronto-based polling firms and the realities of Quebec society.

The company's political opinion polls are often cited in Quebec news media.
