= Layton (surname) =

Layton is a surname derived from various place names in England. Two known etymologies stem from place names in Lancashire (in Blackpool) and another in North Yorkshire. The former was named in Old English as ‘settlement by the watercourse’, from Old English lād ‘watercourse’ + tūn ‘enclosure’, ‘settlement’; the latter as ‘leek enclosure’ or ‘herb garden’, from lēac ‘leek’ + tūn. Also often spelled as Leighton.

== People with the family name ==
- Bentley Layton (1941–2025), American religious scholar
- Bob Layton (born 1953), American comic book artist
- Caleb R. Layton (1851–1930), U.S. Representative from Delaware
- Caleb S. Layton (1798–1882), American politician and judge from Delaware
- Chris Layton (born 1955), American drummer
- Christopher Layton (1821–1898), Latter-day Saint church leader
- Daniel J. Layton (1879–1960), Supreme Court Justice of Delaware
- David Layton (1914–2009), British economist and industrial relations specialist
- Eddie Layton (1925–2004), American organist
- Edwin T. Layton (1903–1984), American naval intelligence officer
- Geoffrey Layton (1884–1964), British admiral
- George Layton (born 1942), British actor
- George Layton (footballer) (1865–after 1902), English professional footballer
- Gilbert Layton (1899–1961), Canadian politician
- Graham Layton (1917–1999), British-Pakistani Army officer, businessperson, and philanthropist
- Irving Layton (1912–2006), Canadian poet
- Jack Layton (1950–2011), Canadian politician
- Joe Layton (1931–1994), American director and choreographer
- Julian Layton (born 1904) Jewish banker and diplomat
- Lindy Layton (born 1970), British singer
- Michael John Layton, 2nd Baron Layton (1912–1989), British businessman and politician
- Mike Layton (born 1980), Canadian politician
- Paul Layton (born 1947), English bass guitarist
- Randy Layton, American music producer
- Richard Layton (c. 1500–1544), English cleric active in closure of the monasteries
- Richard Layton (1815–1893), English organist of Stamford, Lincolnshire
- Robert Layton (1925–2002), Canadian politician
- Robyn Layton, Australian lawyer
- Stephen Layton (born 1966), English conductor
- Turner Layton (1894–1978), American songwriter, singer and pianist
- Walter Thomas Layton, 1st Baron Layton (1884–1966), British economist, editor, and newspaper proprietor

== Fictional character ==
- Hershel Layton, fictional detective and professor of archaeology from the Professor Layton series
- Katrielle "Kat" Layton, a fictional detective from the Layton's Mystery Journey game.
- Lucille Layton, Hershel Layton's adoptive mother
- Roland Layton, Hershel Layton's adoptive father

== See also ==
- Leyton (surname)
- Layton (given name)
- Layton (disambiguation)
