= Layton family =

Canadian political family

- Political family
- Current region: Ontario
- Origin: England; Germany
- Titles: Minister of State; Leader of the Opposition; Mayor of Toronto

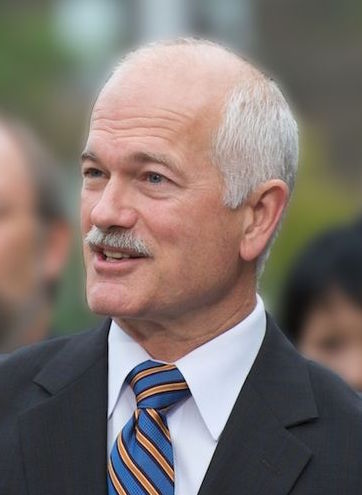
Jack Layton, 2008

The Layton family is a Canadian political family. It includes Jack Layton, who served as the leader of the New Democratic Party. It also includes Olivia Chow, Jack's widow who is Mayor of Toronto since 2023 and served as a city councillor for Metropolitan Toronto and the City of Toronto from 1998 to 2005 and as a member of Parliament for Trinity—Spadina from 2006 to 2014; and Jack's son (and Olivia's step-son) Mike Layton, who served as a city councillor in Toronto for Ward 11 University—Rosedale from 2010 until 2022.

== Notable members ==
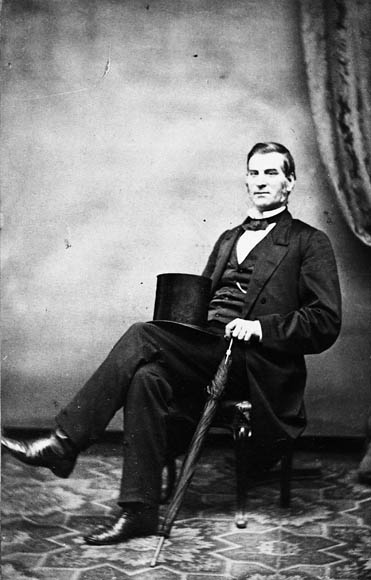
- William Steeves
  William Steeves (May 20, 1814 – December 9, 1873) was a merchant, lumberman, politician and Father of Canadian Confederation.
- Gilbert Layton (November 5, 1899 – May 29, 1961) was a politician and businessman in Quebec, Canada. Gilbert was the father of Robert, the grandfather of Jack, and great-grandfather of Mike.
- Robert Layton PC (December 25, 1925 – May 9, 2002) served as the minister of State from 1984 to 1986. He was Gilbert's son.
- Jack Layton PC MSC (July 18, 1950 – August 22, 2011) was an academic and politician who served as the leader of the New Democratic Party (NDP) from 2003 to 2011 and leader of the Official Opposition in 2011. He previously sat on Toronto City Council, occasionally holding the title of acting mayor or deputy mayor of Toronto during his tenure as city councillor. Layton was the member of Parliament for Toronto—Danforth from 2004 until his death.
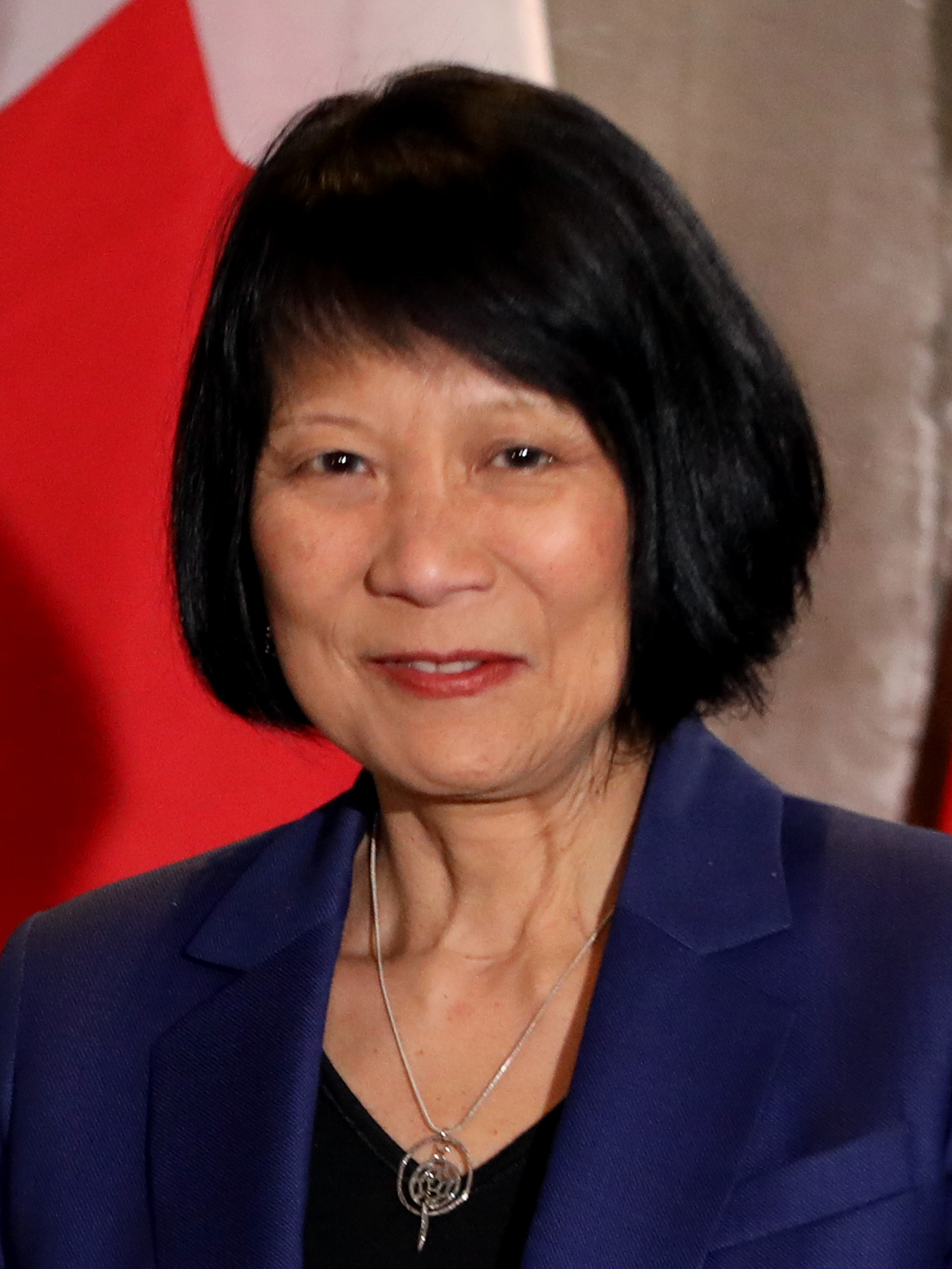
- Olivia Chow, 2024
  Olivia Chow (Chinese: 鄒至蕙; born March 24, 1957) won the by-election to become Mayor of Toronto in 2023. She was previously member of Parliament representing Trinity—Spadina for the federal New Democratic Party from 2006 to 2014. She ran in the 2014 Toronto mayoral election placing third, and served on the Metropolitan Toronto Council from 1991 to the 1998 amalgamation and subsequently on Toronto City Council until 2005, when she ran for MP. She was an elected Toronto Board of Education trustee from 1985 to 1991. She is the widow of Jack, whom she married in 1988.
- Mike Layton (born November 26, 1980) served on Toronto City Council from 2010 until 2022. Layton most recently represented Ward 11 University—Rosedale. He was first elected in the 2010 municipal election in Ward 19 Trinity—Spadina. Layton did not run for re-election in 2022. He is the son of Jack and step-son of Olivia.

Layton family tree

Mary Beck Steeves (1761‑1826)	Henry Steeves (1758‑1826)
Joseph Steeves (1790‑1843)	John Steeves (1782‑1857)
William Steeves (1814‑1873)	Christian Albertson Steeves (1815‑1905)
John Trites Steeves (1859‑1940)
Gilbert Layton (1899‑1961)	John Trites Rowe Steeves (1891‑1969)
Robert Layton (1925‑2002)	Doris Elizabeth Steeves (1926‑2022)
Jack Layton (1950‑2011)	Olivia Chow (b. 1957)
Mike Layton (b. 1980)

== Offices held ==
Minister of state (Canada)

- 1984 to 1986

Leader of the Official Opposition

- 2011

Leader of the New Democratic Party

- 2003 to 2011

Parliamentarian
Member of the House of Commons

- Lachine (Robert)
  - 1984 to 1988
- Lachine—Lac-Saint-Louis (Robert)
  - 1988 to 1993
- Toronto—Danforth
  - 2004 to 2011 (Jack)
- Trinity—Spadina
  - 2006 to 2014 (Olivia)

Senator

- New Brunswick
  - 1867 to 1873

Mayor of Toronto

- 2023 to present

Toronto City Councillor

- 1982 to 1985 (Jack)
- 1988 to 1991 (Jack)
- 1998 to 2005 (Olivia)
- 2010 to 2022 (Mike)

Metropolitan Toronto Councillor

- 1991 to 1998 (Olivia)
- 1985 to 1988 (Jack)
- 1994 to 2004 (Jack)

Toronto District School Board trustee

- 1985 to 1991

== See also ==
- Trudeau family
- Ford family (Canada)
