= Leighton (surname) =

Leighton is an English surname. Notable people with the surname include:

- Alexander Leighton (1587–1644), Scottish physician and pamphleteer
- Alexander H. Leighton (1908–2007), sociologist and psychiatrist
- Amanda Leighton (born 1993), American actress
- Baron Leighton of St Mellons, UK peerage title
- Bernardo Leighton, Chilean Christian Democrat
- Clare Leighton (1898–1989), English-American wood engraver and artist
- David Keller Leighton, Sr. (1922–2013), American Episcopalian bishop
- Dorothea Leighton (1908–1989), American social psychiatrist and a founder of the field of medical anthropology
- Edmund Blair Leighton (1853–1922), English painter
- Edward Leighton (disambiguation), several people
- F. Thomson Leighton, computer scientist and co-founder of Akamai Technologies
- Florence Winsome Leighton (1948–2024), the birth name of British television presenter Wincey Willis
- Frederic Leighton, 1st Baron Leighton (1830–1896), English painter and sculptor
- George N. Leighton (1912–2018), American judge
- Isabel Leighton (1899–1995), American actress and playwright
- Jane Leighton, English healthcare activist and television producer
- Jim Leighton, Scottish footballer
- Kenneth Leighton (1929–1988), British composer
- Laura Leighton (born 1968), US actor
- Michael Leighton (born 1981), Canadian ice hockey goaltender
- Roland Leighton (1895–1915), British poet and soldier who was killed in the First World War, and Vera Brittain's fiancé
- Robert Leighton (author) (1858–1934), British author of historical adventure fiction and books about dogs. Father to Clare Leighton (1898–1989) and Roland Leighton (1985–1915)
- Robert Leighton (bishop) (1611–1684), Scottish preacher, Bishop of Dunblane, Archbishop of Glasgow, & academic
- Robert Leighton (broadcaster) (1956–2008), English broadcaster
- Robert Leighton (cartoonist) (born 1960), American writer, puzzle writer and cartoonist
- Robert Leighton (film editor), British film editor
- Robert B. Leighton (1919–1997), American physicist
- Timothy Leighton (born 1963), British scientist
- Warner E. Leighton, film editor, mainly for Hanna-Barbera
