= Lord Layton =

Lord Layton may refer to:

- Lord Athol Layton (1919–1984), British-Australian boxer-wrestler
- Baron Layton, a British peerage title created in 1947, and held by several successors
  - Walter Thomas Layton, 1st Baron Layton (1884–1966), British economist, editor, newspaperman
  - Michael Layton, 2nd Baron Layton (1912–1989), British businessman and politician

== See also ==
- Sir Geoffrey Layton (1884–1964), British admiral
- Layton (surname)
- Layton (given name)
- Layton (disambiguation)
