= John Leighton =

John Leighton may refer to:

- John Leighton (MP) (15th century), MP for Bedford
- John Leighton (artist) (1822–1912), artist and book cover designer
- John S. Leighton (1835–1916), politician from New Brunswick
- John Leighton (baseball) (1861–1956), Major League Baseball outfielder
- John Leighton (footballer) (1865–1944), Nottingham Forest and England footballer
- John Leighton (curator) (born 1959) British art historian, curator and museum director
- John Leighton (miller), a flour miller in early Sydney; his nickname, 'Jack the Miller', is the origin of the name of the suburb of Millers Point.

== See also ==
- Leighton (disambiguation)
