= Leyton (disambiguation) =

Leyton is a district of east London.

Leyton may also refer to:

- Leyton (UK Parliament constituency)
- Leyton (ward), an electoral ward of the London Borough of Waltham Forest
- Municipal Borough of Leyton, a local government district in southwest Essex, England, from 1873 to 1965
- Leyton F.C., a football club in the district of Leyton
- Leyton (company), a French consultancy firm
- Leyton High School, a public high school in Dalton, Nebraska, United States
- Leyton (surname)

== See also ==
- Lleyton, a given name
- Layton (disambiguation)
- Leighton (disambiguation)
