= Leighton =

Leighton may refer to:

== Places ==
In Australia:

- Leighton, Western Australia, a beachside locality

In the United Kingdom:

- Leighton, Cambridgeshire, a village
- Leighton, Cheshire, a scattered settlement near Crewe
- Leighton, North Yorkshire, a hamlet
  - Leighton Reservoir
- Leighton, Shropshire, a civil parish
- Leighton, a village on the Wirral; see Wirral Hundred § Villages
- Leighton Buzzard, a town in Bedfordshire, England
- Leighton Hall, Lancashire, 18th century country house
- Leighton Hall, Powys, including Leighton Model Farm
- Leighton House, Wiltshire, a country house
- Leighton House Museum, a museum in London
- Leighton Library, an historic library in Dunblane, Scotland
- RSPB Leighton Moss, English nature reserve

In the United States:

- Leighton, Alabama
- Leighton, Iowa
- Leighton Township, Michigan

In Asia:

- Leighton Hill, Hong Kong

== People ==
- Leighton (given name)
- Leighton (surname)
  - Leighton Baronets

== Other uses ==
- CIMIC Group, Australian project development and contracting company until 2015 known as Leighton Holdings
- Leighton Asia, a construction contractor headquartered in Hong Kong
- Leighton Marshalling Yard, former railway yard in Perth, Australia
- Leighton Middle School, a middle school in Leighton Buzzard, England
- Leighton Park School, an independent secondary school in Reading, England

== See also ==
- Leyton (disambiguation)
- Layton (disambiguation)
- Leeton (disambiguation)
