= Lefton =

Lefton is a surname. Notable people with the surname include:

- Lester Lefton (born 1946), American psychologist and academic administrator
- Melissa Lefton (born 1975), American singer-songwriter and comedian

== See also ==
- Leyton (surname)
- Lofton
