= Robert Leighton =

Robert Leighton may refer to:

- Robert Leighton (bishop) (1611–1684), Scottish preacher, Bishop of Dunblane, Archbishop of Glasgow, & academic
- Robert Leighton (author) (1858–1934), British author of historical adventure fiction and books about Dogs
- Robert Leighton (cartoonist) (born 1960), American writer, puzzle writer and cartoonist
- Robert B. Leighton (1919–1997), American physicist
- Robert Leighton (broadcaster) (1956–2008), English broadcaster
- Robert Leighton (film editor), British film editor
- Robert Leighton (MP) (born 1628), MP for Shrewsbury (UK Parliament constituency) 1661–1679
