= Robert Layton (politician) =

Canadian politician

The Honourable Robert Layton PC

Minister of State (Mines)
- In office September 17, 1984 – June 29, 1986
- Prime Minister: Brian Mulroney
- Minister: Pat Carney
- Preceded by: Bill Rompkey
- Succeeded by: Gerald Merrithew (as Minister of State (Forestry and Mines))

Member of Parliament for Lachine—Lac-Saint-Louis (Lachine; 1984–1988)
- In office September 4, 1984 – October 25, 1993
- Preceded by: Roderick Blaker
- Succeeded by: Clifford Lincoln

Personal details
- Born: Robert Edward John Layton; December 25, 1925 Montreal, Quebec, Canada
- Died: May 9, 2002 (aged 76) Toronto, Ontario, Canada
- Resting place: Wyman United Church, Hudson, Quebec, Canada
- Party: Progressive Conservative
- Spouse: Doris Elizabeth Steeves
- Children: 4 including Jack
- Parent: Gilbert Layton (father)
- Education: McGill University
- Occupation: Politician
- Profession: Consulting engineer

Robert Edward John Layton PC (December 25, 1925 – May 9, 2002) was a Canadian politician who served as the minister of State from 1984 to 1986.

== Early career ==
Robert Layton was born in Montreal, the son of Norah Lestelle (née England) and former Quebec cabinet minister Gilbert Layton. He graduated from McGill University in 1947. He spent much of his professional career running an engineering consulting business in Montreal.

He became a political activist for the Liberal Party of Canada, running unsuccessfully in 1972 for the party's nomination for the riding of Vaudreuil.

== Member of Parliament ==
In the 1980s, he joined the Progressive Conservative Party, and was elected to the Parliament of Canada in the 1984 election from the Quebec riding of Lachine, covering suburban communities on the west end of the island of Montreal. He was re-elected in the 1988 election. Layton served as Minister of State for Mines in the federal cabinet of Prime Minister Brian Mulroney from 1984 to 1986, after which he served as National Caucus Chairman until 1993 when he decided to retire from politics after being diagnosed with prostate cancer.

== Personal life ==
Layton married Doris Elizabeth Steeves, a grand-niece of Father of Confederation William Steeves.

Robert Layton had three sons and a daughter. His eldest son, Jack Layton became a leader of the federal New Democratic Party and Leader of the Official Opposition in the House of Commons. He is the grandfather of Toronto City Councillor Mike Layton.

Layton died in Toronto on May 9, 2002.
