= Lleyton =

Lleyton is a male given name. Notable people with the name include:

- Lleyton Brooks (born 2001), Australian soccer footballer
- Lleyton Hewitt (born 1981), Australian tennis player
- Lleyton Roed (born 2002), American ice hockey player

== See also ==
- Leyton (disambiguation)
- Layton (disambiguation)
- Leighton (disambiguation)
