= Layton (given name) =

Layton is a masculine given name which may refer to:

- Layton Freborg (born 1933), American politician
- Layton Kor (1938–2013), American rock climber
- Layton Maxwell (born 1979), Welsh footballer
- Layton Williams (born 1994), English actor

== See also ==
- Layton (surname)
- Layton (disambiguation)
- Lleyton (given name)
- Leighton (given name)
