= Leighton (given name) =

Leighton is a given name. Notable people with the name include:

- Leighton Andrews (born 1957), Welsh academic and politician
- Leighton Aspell (born 1976), Irish jockey
- Leighton Baines (born 1984), English soccer player
- Leighton Baker, New Zealand politician
- Leighton Clarkson (born 2001), English soccer player
- Leighton Coleman (1837–1907), American clergyman
- Leighton I. Davis (1910–1995), American Air Force Lieutenant General
- Leighton Dye (1901–1977), American hurdler
- Leighton Eksteen (born 1994), South African rugby union player
- Leighton Elliott (born 1984), Caymanian soccer player
- Leighton Evans, Welsh philosopher and professor
- Leighton Glynn (born 1982), Irish Gaelic football and hurling player
- Leighton Hodges (born 1975), Welsh rugby union referee
- Leighton A. Hope (1921–1998), American politician
- Leighton James (born 1953), Welsh footballer
- Leighton Jordan (born 1992), American beauty queen
- Leighton Lucas (1903–1982), English composer and conductor
- Leighton McCarthy (1869–1952), Canadian diplomat, lawyer, and politician
- Leighton McGivern (born 1984), English soccer player
- Leighton McIntosh (born 1993), Scottish soccer player
- Leighton Meester (born 1986), American actress, singer, and model
- Leighton Noble (1912–1994), American bandleader and vocalist
- Leighton O'Brien (born 1976), American soccer player
- Leighton Osmun (1880–1928), American author, playwright, and screenwriter
- Leighton Phillips (born 1949), Welsh soccer player
- Leighton Pierce (born 1954), American filmmaker
- Leighton Price (born 1989), New Zealand rugby union player
- Leighton Priestley (born 1951), Jamaican sprinter
- Leighton Rees (1940–2003), Welsh dart player
- Leighton P. Slack (1867–1938), American attorney and judge
- Leighton Swarts, South African cricketer
- Leighton Vander Esch (born 1997), American football player
- Leighton Williams (born 1977), Welsh chess player

== See also ==
- Leighton Buzzard
- Lleyton (given name)
- Layton (given name)
