= Layton =

Layton or The Laytons may refer to:

== Places ==
=== United States ===
- Layton, Florida, a city
- Layton Township, Pottawattamie County, Iowa
- Layton, New Jersey, an unincorporated community
- Layton, Pennsylvania, an unincorporated community
- Layton, Utah, a city

=== England ===
- Layton, Blackpool, a district of the town of Blackpool, Lancashire, England

== American schools ==
- Layton High School, Layton, Utah
- Layton School of Art, a former post-secondary school in Milwaukee, Wisconsin
- Layton Preparatory School, a private preparatory school in Centreville, Delaware

== Transportation ==
- Layton railway station (England), Layton, Lancashire
- Layton station (FrontRunner), a commuter rail station in Layton, Utah
- Layton Bridge, a road bridge (formerly a railroad bridge) in Pennsylvania, United States, on the National Register of Historic Places

== People ==
- Layton (surname)
- Layton (given name)

== Other uses ==
- Baron Layton, a title in the Peerage of the United Kingdom
- Professor Hershel Layton, title character of the Professor Layton series of video games
- The Laytons, a 1948 American sitcom

== See also ==
- Layton House, Laytonsville, Maryland, United States, on the National Register of Historic Places
- Lord Layton (disambiguation)
- Leighton (disambiguation) (may be pronounced 'lay-ton' or 'lie-ton')
- Leyton (disambiguation)
- Lawton (disambiguation)
