= Leeton =

Leeton is the name of more than one place:

- Leeton, Missouri, a town in the United States
- Leeton, New South Wales, a town in the Riverina region of New South Wales, Australia
  - Leeton Shire, the local government area of New South Wales for which Leeton serves as the administrative centre and namesake
