= Leyton (company) =

International consultancy headquartered in Paris, France

- Type: Private
- Industry: Consulting
- Founded: 1997
- Founders: François Gouilliard, Olivier de Beauminy
- Headquarters: Paris, France,
- Number of locations: 17 (2025)
- Area served: Worldwide
- Number of employees: 3,000 (2025)
- Website: www.leyton.com

Leyton is an international consultancy headquartered in Paris, France. The company specialises in supporting the financial, social, and environmental performance of companies.

Leyton’s services include helping businesses access public funding in the form of tax incentives, grants and exemptions, such as R&D tax credits, SR&ED, CIR and Forschungszulage.

== History ==
Leyton was co-founded in Paris in 1997 by François Gouilliard and Olivier de Beauminy.

Leyton’s client portfolio has grown from 500 companies in 2007 to 7,000 in 2018. Today Leyton has more than 50,000 clients worldwide.

In 2025, Leyton launched Leyton CognitX to develop artificial intelligence and automation technology. Leyton's AI voice agent, Adam, was subsequently selected by the French government as part of an open call aimed at finding viable AI technologies for use in the public service.

== Global structure ==
As of January 2025, Leyton employs 3,000 people globally and is based in 17 countries spread across Europe, Africa and North America, including in Germany, Spain, Canada, the USA, France, Italy and the UK.

Leyton’s international footprint includes significant operations in North America and the United Kingdom. In Canada, the firm maintains offices in Montreal, Toronto, Calgary, and Vancouver, specialising in SR&ED tax credits, government grants and other incentives. The U.S. division, with hubs in Boston, Houston, New York City and Phoenix, assists with R&D tax credits, cost segregation, and tariff advisory. In the United Kingdom, the company operates from London, Manchester and Glasgow, specialising in R&D tax credits, capital allowances, energy tax exemptions and patent box.

== Sailing sponsorship ==
In 2018, Leyton began sponsoring sailing teams as part of its commitment to environmental and social causes, supporting races in the Class40, Figaro, Ocean Fifty and IMOCA racing classes.

In 2019, Leyton partnered with British offshore sailor Sam Goodchild.

Leyton co-founded the collective We Sail for People and Planet with cybersecurity firm Advens and TR Racing in 2023 with the goal of “combining sporting performance with social and environmental performance”.

Leyton is currently the official partner of the France SailGP Team, led by Quentin Delapierre.
