= John Leighton (curator) =

Irish curator, art historian and museum director

Sir John Mark Nicholas Leighton
- Born: 22 February 1959 (age 67); Belfast
- Occupation: Museum Director

Sir John Leighton (born 22 February 1959) is a British art historian, curator and museum director. He was (until October 2023 when Anne Lyden took control) Director-General of the National Galleries of Scotland.

== Early life ==
Leighton was born in Belfast in 1959 and educated at Portora Royal School Enniskillen (1970 – 77). He studied Fine Art at the University of Edinburgh and Edinburgh College of Art, graduating in 1982. He undertook postgraduate studies at the Courtauld Institute of Art in London, obtaining an MA in 1983.

== Career ==
Leighton was Curator of 19th-century paintings at the National Gallery in London from 1986 until 1997. He was responsible for numerous exhibitions during this period including Caspar David Friedrich’s Winter Landscapes (1990), Art in the Making: Impressionism (1990), Seurat’s Bathers (1997). He was Director of the Van Gogh Museum in Amsterdam from 1997 until 2006. Leighton has been Director-General of the National Galleries of Scotland since 2006. He was elected a Fellow of the Royal Society of Edinburgh in 2008.

In recognition of his contribution to the arts, he was appointed Chevalier of the Ordre des Arts et des Lettres in 2005, awarded an honorary degree from the University of Edinburgh in 2009 and a knighthood in December 2012. Leighton is a board member of the De Pont Museum of Contemporary Art in Tilburg; chair of the Council of Specialists of the H'ART Museum and a member of the supervisory board of the Rijksmuseum in Amsterdam.

John Leighton has written several books and articles, including: 100 Masterpieces, National Galleries of Scotland, Edinburgh, 2015 Manet and the Sea, with Gloria Groom et al. (Art Institute of Chicago, Philadelphia Museum of Art, Van Gogh Museum, 2003 –2004). The Van Gogh Museum: A portrait, Van Gogh Museum, Amsterdam 2003 Signac 1863 -1935 with Marina Ferretti-Bocquillon et al. (Grand Palais, Paris, Van Gogh Museum, Amsterdam, Metropolitan Museum of Art, New York, 2001). Seurat's Bathers with Richard Thomson (National Gallery, London, 1997) Art in the Making: Impressionism with David Bomford et al.(National Gallery, London, 1990) Caspar David Friedrich 'Winter Landscape’ with Colin J. Bailey (National Gallery, London, 1989) French Paintings from the USSR with Alastair Smith et al. (National Gallery, London, 1988)

== Personal life ==
Leighton is married to Gill Keay; they have one daughter and one son.
