= Jack Layton =

Canadian politician (1950–2011)

The Honourable Jack Layton PC MSC
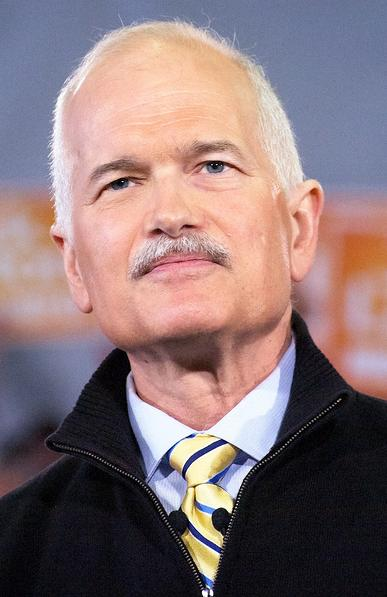
- Layton in 2011

Leader of the Opposition
- In office May 2, 2011 – August 22, 2011
- Preceded by: Michael Ignatieff
- Succeeded by: Nycole Turmel

Leader of the New Democratic Party
- In office January 25, 2003 – August 22, 2011 (Note: Layton was on leave from July 28 to August 22, 2011.)
- Deputy: Bill Blaikie; Libby Davies; Tom Mulcair
- Preceded by: Alexa McDonough
- Succeeded by: Nycole Turmel (interim)

Member of Parliament for Toronto—Danforth
- In office June 28, 2004 – August 22, 2011
- Preceded by: Dennis Mills
- Succeeded by: Craig Scott

Toronto City Councillor
- In office 1994–2003
- Preceded by: Ward established
- Succeeded by: Paula Fletcher
- Constituency: Ward 25 (1994–2000); Ward 30 (2000–2003)
- In office 1982–1991
- Preceded by: Dan Heap
- Succeeded by: Kyle Rae
- Constituency: Ward 6

Personal details
- Born: John Gilbert Layton; July 18, 1950 Montreal, Quebec, Canada
- Died: August 22, 2011 (aged 61) Toronto, Ontario, Canada
- Party: New Democratic
- Spouses: Sally Halford (m. 1969; div. 1983) Olivia Chow (m. 1988)
- Children: 2, including Mike
- Parent: Robert Layton (father)
- Relatives: Layton family
- Education: McGill University (BA); York University (MA, PhD)
- Occupation: Academic

John Gilbert Layton (July 18, 1950 – August 22, 2011) was a Canadian politician and academic who served as the leader of the New Democratic Party (NDP) from 2003 to 2011 and leader of the Official Opposition in 2011. He previously sat on the Toronto City Council, occasionally holding the title of acting mayor or deputy mayor of Toronto during his tenure as city councillor. Layton was the member of Parliament (MP) for Toronto—Danforth from 2004 until his death.

The son of Robert Layton, a Progressive Conservative cabinet minister, Layton was raised in Hudson, Quebec. He rose to prominence in Toronto municipal politics, where he was one of the most prominent left-wing voices on the city and Metropolitan Toronto councils, championing many progressive causes. In 1991, he ran for mayor, losing to June Rowlands. Returning to council, he rose to become head of the Federation of Canadian Municipalities. In 2003, he was elected leader of the NDP on the first ballot of the leadership election.

Under his leadership, support for the NDP increased in each election. The party's popular vote almost doubled in the 2004 election, which almost gave the NDP the balance of power in Paul Martin's minority government. In May 2005, the NDP supported the Liberal budget in exchange for major amendments, in what was promoted as Canada's "first NDP budget". In November of that year, Layton voted with other opposition parties to defeat the Liberal government over the findings of the Gomery Commission. The NDP saw further gains in the 2006 and 2008 elections, in which the party elected 29 and 37 MPs, respectively. His wife, Olivia Chow, was also an MP and has served as the 66th mayor of Toronto since 2023.

In the 2011 election, Layton led the NDP to the most successful result in the party's history, winning 103 seats—making the party the Official Opposition for the first time. Federal support for Layton and the NDP in the election was unprecedented, especially in the province of Quebec, where the party won 59 out of 75 seats.

Layton died on August 22, 2011, after being diagnosed with cancer. Details of the type and spread of the cancer, and the exact cause of death, were not released to the public. Shortly before he died, Layton had nominated Nycole Turmel as interim leader of the NDP and, consequently, of the Official Opposition. Tom Mulcair won the leadership election to succeed him.

== Early life and career ==
John Gilbert Layton was born on July 18, 1950 in Montreal, Quebec, to parents Doris Elizabeth (née Steeves), and Progressive Conservative MP Robert Layton. He was the maternal great-grandnephew of William Steeves, a Father of Confederation, and his grandfather, Gilbert Layton, had served as a minister without portfolio to the government of Quebec's Union Nationale under Premier Maurice Duplessis. Layton was raised in Hudson, a largely Anglophone suburb of Montreal, where he served as the student council president of Hudson High School. He would later credit longtime friend and musician Billy Bryans for having played a role in his student council victory. In his graduating yearbook, Layton wrote as a testament, "I leave to become prime minister."

In 1969, he was appointed as the Quebec Youth Parliament prime minister, holding this position until 1970. That same year, Layton graduated from McGill University with a Bachelor of Arts (BA) with honours in political science and economics, and was a member of the Sigma Chi fraternity. During his time spent at McGill, Layton's view on politics had been greatly influenced by professor, philosopher and mentor Charles Taylor, so much so that he decided to switch his major from science to arts. Moreover, it was on Taylor's advice that he pursued his studies in Toronto, in order to study under the students of political philosopher C. B. Macpherson at York University. Layton followed pacifism and participated in anti-Vietnam War demonstrations.

In a foreword Layton wrote for Canadian Idealism and the Philosophy of Freedom, he explains, "The idealist current holds that human society has the potential to achieve liberty when people work together to form a society in which equality means more than negative liberty, the absolute and protected right to run races against each other to determine winners. Idealists imagine a positive liberty that enables us to build together toward common objectives that fulfil and even surpass our individual goals." Upon reading Canadian Idealism and the Philosophy of Freedom, Layton came to understand himself as part of the intellectual tradition of Canadian idealists.

In 1970, Layton joined the New Democratic Party, and would later cite his influence being from Tommy Douglas voicing opposition to the imposition of the War Measures Act during the 1970 October Crisis. He also moved to Toronto to attend York University, where he received his Master of Arts (MA) in political science in 1972; he would also later receive his Doctor of Philosophy (PhD) in political science there in 1983 under the supervision of David Bell. (Note: Sources state that he received his MA in either 1971 or 1972, and his PhD in either 1983 or 1984. According to York University, he received his MA in 1972 and his PhD in 1983.) In 1974, Layton began his academic career as an educator at Ryerson Polytechnical Institute (now Toronto Metropolitan University), where he taught political science. He also spent time working at York and, from 1978 to 1994, worked at the University of Toronto as an adjunct professor. He also became a prominent activist for a variety of causes. He wrote several books, including Homelessness: The Making and Unmaking of a Crisis and a book on general public policy, Speaking Out.

== Municipal politics ==
While at York and Ryerson, Layton developed close ties with a number of Toronto political figures including John Sewell and David Crombie. He was first elected to Toronto City Council during the 1982 municipal election, in a surprise upset against incumbent Gordon Chong as an underdog. Layton quickly became one of the council's most outspoken members and a leading figure on the left. He was one of the most vocal opponents of the massive SkyDome project, and an early advocate for rights for AIDS patients. In 1984, Layton was fined for trespassing after distributing leaflets at the Toronto Eaton Centre during a strike by Eaton's employees, but the charge was later dismissed on free speech grounds. He was also one of the few opponents of Toronto's bid to host the 1996 Summer Olympics. In 1985, Layton moved to the Metropolitan Toronto Council, in the first direct elections for members of that body. During the 1988 municipal elections, Layton swapped roles with his ally Dale Martin, with Martin moving to Metro and Layton returning to Toronto City Council. Layton won comfortably against former high school teacher Lois MacMillan-Walker. The election was a major victory for Layton as the reformist coalition of which he was the de facto head gained control of city council, the first time in city history a coalition of New Democrats and independents controlled council.

On July 9, 1988, he married Hong Kong-born Toronto District School Board trustee Olivia Chow in a ceremony on Algonquin Island. Their whitewater rafting honeymoon plans had to be abandoned, however, when days before the wedding Layton collided with a newspaper box while bicycling. Chow later joined Layton on the Toronto City Council. She has been a candidate for the federal New Democrats five times, first winning her seat the third time in a close race against Tony Ianno in the 2006 Canadian election, and re-elected in 2008 and 2011. Chow resigned from federal politics in 2014 to run for mayor of Toronto; she placed third. Chow would later be elected mayor in the 2023 mayoral by-election.

Layton and Chow were also the subject of some dispute when a June 14, 1990, Toronto Star article by Tom Kerr accused them of unfairly living in a housing cooperative subsidized by the federal government, despite their high income. Layton and Chow had both lived in the Hazelburn co-op since 1985, and lived together in an $800 per month three-bedroom apartment after their marriage in 1988. By 1990, their combined annual income was $120,000, and in March of that year they began voluntarily paying an additional $325 per month to offset their share of the co-op's Canada Mortgage and Housing Corporation subsidy, the only members of the co-op to do so. In response to the article, the co-op's board argued that having mixed-income tenants was crucial to the success of co-ops, and that the laws deliberately set aside apartments for those willing to pay market rates, such as Layton and Chow. During the late 1980s and early 1990s they maintained approximately 30% of their units as low income units and provided the rest at what they considered market rent. In June 1990, the city solicitor cleared the couple of any wrongdoing, and later that month, Layton and Chow left the co-op and bought a house in Toronto's Chinatown together with Chow's mother, a move they said had been planned for some time. Former Toronto mayor John Sewell later wrote in NOW that rival Toronto city councillor Tom Jakobek had given the story to Tom Kerr.

Originally known for coming to council meetings in blue jeans with unkempt hair, Layton worked to change his image to run for mayor in the 1991 civic election. He also started wearing contact lenses, abandoning his glasses, and traded in his blue jeans for suits. In February 1991, Layton became the first official NDP candidate for the mayoralty, pitting him against centrist incumbent Art Eggleton. In a move that surprised many, Eggleton elected not to run again.

Layton was opposed by three right-of-centre candidates: Susan Fish, June Rowlands, and Betty Disero. Right-wing support soon coalesced around former city councillor Rowlands, preventing the internal divisions Layton needed to win office. Layton was also hurt by the growing unpopularity of the provincial NDP government of Bob Rae, and by his earlier opposition to Toronto's Olympic bid. Bid organizer Paul Henderson accused Layton and his allies of costing Toronto the event. Despite this, October polls showed Layton only four points behind Rowlands, with 36% support. However, on October 17, Fish, a former provincial Progressive Conservative cabinet minister who had only 19% support, pulled out of the race, and many of her supporters moved to Rowlands. Layton lost the November 12 election by a considerable margin. However, in the same election Olivia Chow easily won a seat on city council.

In November 1991, Layton co-founded the White Ribbon Campaign of men working to end male violence against women. Layton returned to academia and also founded the Green Catalyst Group Inc., an environmental consulting business. In 1993, he ran for the House of Commons in the riding of Rosedale for the NDP, but finished fourth in the generally Liberal riding. In 1994, he returned to Metropolitan Toronto Council, succeeding Roger Hollander in the Don River ward, and he resumed his high-profile role in local politics; following the "megacity" merger of Metropolitan Toronto into the current city of Toronto, he was again re-elected to Toronto City Council, serving alongside Pam McConnell in a two-member ward. He remained on Toronto City Council until pursuing the leadership of the federal New Democrats. He also came to national attention as the leader of the Federation of Canadian Municipalities. Federally, he ran again in the 1997 election, this time in the neighbouring riding of Toronto—Danforth, but lost to incumbent Dennis Mills by a wide margin. In June 1999, as chair of Toronto's environmental task force, the Toronto Atmospheric Fund, he was instrumental in the preliminary phases of the WindShare wind power cooperative in Toronto through the Toronto Renewable Energy Co-operative.

== Leader of the New Democratic Party ==
Layton was elected leader of the NDP at the party's leadership convention in Toronto, on January 25, 2003. Layton won on the first ballot with 53.5% of the vote, defeating Bill Blaikie, Lorne Nystrom, Joe Comartin and Pierre Ducasse. His campaign was focused on the need to reinvigorate the party, and was prominently endorsed by former NDP leader Ed Broadbent.

Layton did not seek election to the House of Commons by running in a by-election, as is the tradition among new party leaders without a seat. Instead, he waited until the 2004 federal election to contest the riding of Toronto—Danforth against Liberal Dennis Mills. With no seat in the House of Commons, he appointed the runner-up, longtime Winnipeg-area MP Bill Blaikie, as parliamentary leader. Although he had no parliamentary seat, Layton was noted for drawing considerable attention from the Canadian mass media. Much of his rhetoric involved attacking the policies of then Canadian Prime Minister Paul Martin as conservative, and arguing the ideology of the Liberal Party of Canada had shifted in a more right wing direction. Another focus of Layton's leadership was to focus the party's efforts on Quebec, one of the party's weaker provinces. One of his opponents in the leadership race, Pierre Ducasse, was the first Québécois to run for leader of the NDP. After the race, Layton appointed Ducasse as his Quebec lieutenant and party spokesperson.

The result of Layton's efforts was a strong increase in the party's support. By the end of 2003, the party was polling higher than both the Canadian Alliance or the Progressive Conservatives and it was even suggested that the next election could see the NDP in place as Official Opposition.

=== 2004 election ===
During the 2004 Canadian federal election, controversy erupted over Layton's accusation that Liberal Prime Minister Paul Martin was responsible for the deaths of homeless people because he failed to provide funding for affordable housing. While rates of homelessness and homeless deaths increased during the eleven years of Liberal government, the link to Martin's decisions was indirect as affordable housing is a mainly provincial jurisdiction. Layton's charge was defended by some, including the Ottawa Citizen, but most attacked it as inaccurate and negative campaigning. Moreover, the controversy consumed the campaign, overshadowing policy announcements over the next week.

Further controversy followed as Layton suggested the removal of the Clarity Act, considered by some to be vital to keeping Quebec in Canada and by others as undemocratic, and promised to recognize any declaration of independence by Quebec after a referendum. This position was not part of the NDP's official party policy, leading some high-profile party members, such as NDP House Leader Bill Blaikie and former NDP leader Alexa McDonough, to publicly indicate that they did not share Layton's views. His position on the Clarity Act was reversed in the 2006 election to one of support.

Layton also continued his effort to improve his party's standing in Quebec. The NDP ran French-language ads in the province and Layton, who spoke colloquial Québécois French, appeared in them. As early as his leadership campaign, Layton advocated for electoral reform, calling for a referendum to replace the first-past-the-post system with proportional representation. He threatened to use the NDP's clout in the event of a minority government. However, it was dismissed out of hand by the Liberal and Bloc Québécois leaders, as they tend to be favoured by the first-past-the-post system, normally being allocated a greater proportion of seats than the proportion of votes cast for them. Historically, the NDP's popular vote does not translate into a proportional number of seats because of scattered support. This was most opposed by the Bloc Québécois, who usually had the lowest popular vote but nonetheless won many seats because their support was concentrated in Quebec. Despite these problems, Layton led the NDP to a 15% popular vote, its highest in 16 years. However, it only won 19 seats in the House of Commons, two less than the 21 won under Alexa McDonough in 1997, and far short of the 40 that Layton predicted on the eve of the election. However, some potential NDP voters may have voted Liberal to prevent a possible Conservative win. Olivia Chow and several other prominent Toronto NDP candidates lost tight races and Layton won his own seat against incumbent Liberal Dennis Mills by a much narrower margin than early polls indicated.

=== 38th Canadian Parliament ===
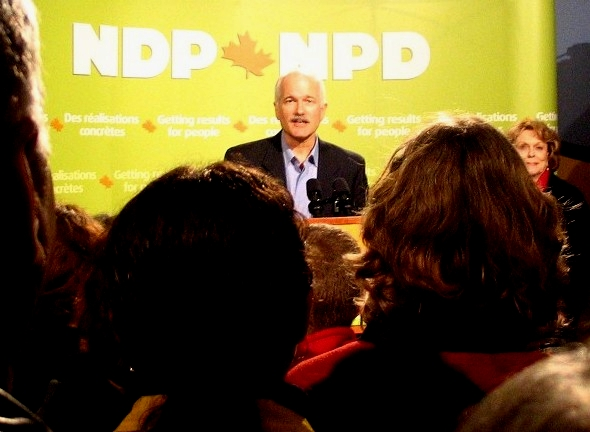
Layton speaks at an NDP rally in Courtenay, British Columbia, in 2006

With the ruling Liberal Party being reduced to a minority government, revelations of the sponsorship scandal damaging its popularity to the point where both the Conservative Party and the Bloc Québécois were pressing their advantage for a snap election, the prime minister approached the NDP for its support. Layton demanded the cancellation of proposed corporate tax cuts and called for an increase in social spending. The ensuing compromise in the NDP's favour was protested by the other opposition parties who used it as a pretext to force a non-confidence vote. On May 19, two such votes were defeated and Layton's amendments went on to be passed on its final reading vote on June 23. As a result of this political coup and his apparent civil behaviour in a spitefully raucous parliament, many political analysts noted that Layton gained increased credibility as an effective leader of an important party, becoming the major second choice leader in many political polls – for example, polling second in Quebec after Gilles Duceppe, despite the low polls for his party as a whole in the province.

In mid-November 2005, when Liberal support dropped after the Gomery Commission delivered its first report, Layton offered the prime minister several conditions in return for the NDP's continued support, most notably on the issue of privatization of health care in Canada, where Layton wanted strict provisions for controlling public spending on private health care delivery, saying that without "significant action" on the issue, "Mr. Martin can't count on our support." Martin for his part offered no comment on a meeting held to discuss the issue, only saying that it was a "good meeting", while Layton publicly expressed his disappointment at the outcome. Layton announced he would introduce a motion requesting a February election. However, the Martin government refused to allow the election date to be decided by the opposition. A motion of non-confidence followed, moved by Stephen Harper and seconded by Layton, triggering the 2006 federal election. Layton was working with the Liberal government, but determined he would have a better chance of electoral success by voting against the government and having an election.

==== Coalition attempt with the Bloc Québécois and the Conservatives ====
On March 26, 2011, in response to Harper's allegations that a coalition is not a legitimate or principled way to form government, Duceppe stated that Harper had once tried to form a coalition government with the Bloc Québécois and NDP. In 2004 Stephen Harper privately met with Bloc Québécois leader Gilles Duceppe and Layton in a Montreal hotel. The meeting that took place between the three party leaders happened two months before the federal election. On September 9, 2004, the three signed a letter addressed to then-Governor General Adrienne Clarkson, stating,

We respectfully point out that the opposition parties, who together constitute a majority in the House, have been in close consultation. We believe that, should a request for dissolution arise, this should give you cause, as constitutional practice has determined, to consult the opposition leaders and consider all of your options before exercising your constitutional authority.

On the same day the letter was written, the three party leaders held a joint press conference at which they expressed their intent to co-operate on changing parliamentary rules, and to request that the governor general consult with them before deciding to call an election. At the news conference, Harper said "It is the Parliament that's supposed to run the country, not just the largest party and the single leader of that party. That's a criticism I've had and that we've had and that most Canadians have had for a long, long time now so this is an opportunity to start to change that." However, at the time, Harper and the two other opposition leaders denied trying to form a coalition government. Harper said, "This is not a coalition, but this is a co-operative effort."

One month later, on October 4, Mike Duffy, now a Conservative senator (appointed by Harper), said "It is possible that you could change prime minister without having an election", and that some Conservatives wanted Harper as prime minister. The next day Layton walked out on talks with Harper and Duceppe, accusing them of trying to replace Paul Martin with Harper as prime minister. Both Bloc and Conservative officials denied Layton's accusations.

=== 2006 election ===
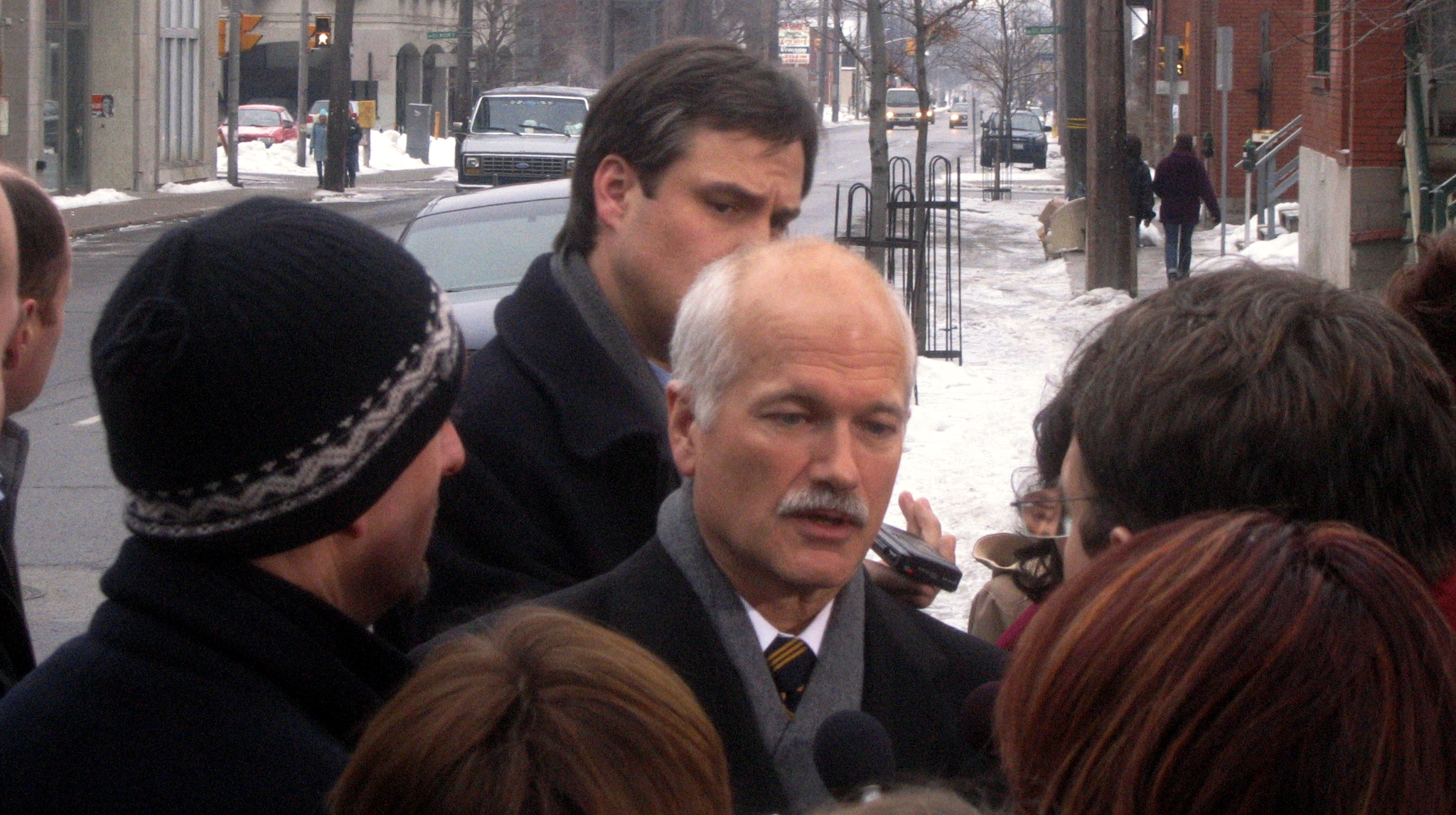
In a media scrum during the 2006 winter election campaign

With a vote scheduled for January 23, 2006, many New Democrats expected Layton to deliver substantially more seats than he did in 2004. They hoped the NDP would hold the balance of power in a new minority Parliament, so that they could carry additional leverage in negotiating with the governing party. Mike Klander, the executive vice-president of the federal Liberals' Ontario wing, resigned after making posts on his blog comparing Chow to a Chow Chow dog and calling Layton an "asshole".

Through the course of the campaign, Layton attempted to cast himself as the sole remaining champion of universal health care. Some opinion polls showed that Canadians found Layton the most appealing and charismatic of the leaders. Layton repeatedly insisted that "Canadians have a third choice", and urged Liberals to "lend us your vote". Some commentators and pundits mocked Layton for over-using these catchphrases instead of explaining the NDP platform.

The NDP strategy had changed in that they were focusing their attacks on the Liberals rather than in 2004, where they criticized both the Liberals and Conservatives in equal measure, prompting some criticism from Paul Martin. Andrew Coyne suggested that the NDP not only wanted to disassociate themselves from the scandal-ridden Liberals, but also because the Liberals were likely to receive credit for legislation achieved under the Liberal-NDP partnership. The NDP had also lost close races in the 2004 election due to the Liberals' strategic voting. Early in the campaign, NDP MP Judy Wasylycia-Leis had asked the Royal Canadian Mounted Police (RCMP) to launch a criminal investigation into the leaking of the income trust announcement. The criminal probe seriously damaged the Liberal campaign and preventing them from making their key policy announcements, as well as bringing alleged Liberal corruption back into the spotlight.

Layton's campaign direction also caused a break between him and Canadian Auto Workers union head Buzz Hargrove over the issue of strategic voting. Hargrove preferred a Liberal minority government supported by the NDP and he had earlier criticized Layton for participating in the motion of non-confidence that brought down the Liberal government. Hargrove allied with the Liberals and publicly stated that he "did not like the campaign that Jack Layton was running", criticizing Layton for "spending too much time attacking the Liberals". During the final week of the campaign, knowing that last-minute strategic voting had cost the NDP seats in several close ridings during the 2004 election, Hargrove and Martin urged all progressive voters to unite behind the Liberal banner to stop a Conservative government.

Layton intensified his attacks on the Liberal scandals, pledging to use his minority clout to keep the Conservatives in check. Shortly after the election, the Ontario provincial branch of the NDP revoked Hargrove's party membership because he had violated the party's constitution by campaigning for other parties during an election campaign, though Layton disagreed with this. Hargrove retaliated by severing ties with the NDP at the annual CAW convention. The election increased the NDP's total seats to 29 seats, up from 18 before dissolution. Among the new NDP candidates elected was Olivia Chow, making the two only the second husband-and-wife team in Canadian Parliament history (Gurmant Grewal and Nina Grewal were the first husband-and-wife team in Canadian Parliament after the 2004 federal election). In the end, the NDP succeeded in increasing their parliamentary representation to 29 MPs, though they had significantly fewer seats than the Bloc Québécois (51) or the Opposition Liberals (103).

=== 39th Canadian Parliament ===
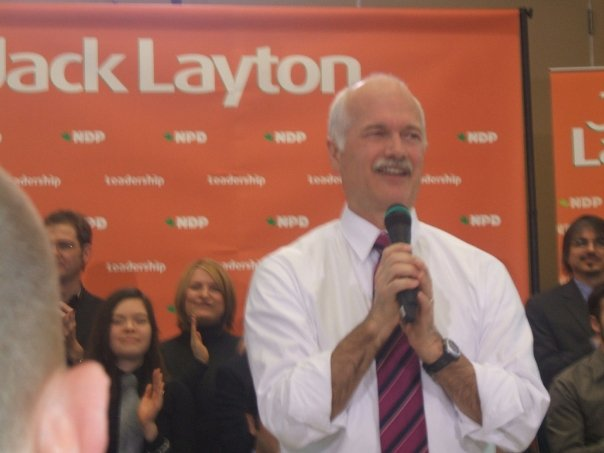
Layton giving a speech on the fifth anniversary of his leadership of the NDP

At the NDP's 22nd Convention, held on September 10, 2006, in Quebec City, Layton received a 92% approval rating in a leadership vote, tying former Reform Party leader Preston Manning's record for this kind of voting. This record was later broken in 2016 by Elizabeth May of the Green Party of Canada. At the same convention, the NDP passed a motion calling for the return of Canadian Forces from Afghanistan. On September 24, 2006, he met with Afghan President Hamid Karzai to discuss the NDP position. After the meeting Layton stated that Canada's role should be focused on traditional peacekeeping and reconstruction rather than in a front line combat role currently taking place.

Layton and his caucus voted to support the new proposed rules for income trusts introduced by the Conservatives October 31, 2006. The short-term result of the tax policy announcement was a loss to Canadian investors of $20 billion, the largest ever loss attributed to a change in government policy.

Layton threatened to move a motion of non-confidence against the government over the "Clean Air Act" unless action was taken to improve the bill and its approach to environmental policy. Prime Minister Harper agreed to put an end to the Parliamentary logjam by sending the bill to a special legislative committee before second reading. He released his proposed changes to the "Clean Air Act" on November 19, 2006.

On June 3, 2008, Layton voted to implement a program which would "allow conscientious objectors ... to a war not sanctioned by the United Nations ... to ... remain in Canada ..." Layton led the NDP to be instrumental in taking action on the peace issue of Canada and Iraq War resisters.

On June 11, 2008, Prime Minister Stephen Harper made it known that he had received private counsel from Layton on the matter of Indian residential schools and the apology to former students of the schools. Before delivering the apology, Harper thanked Layton.

=== 2008 election ===
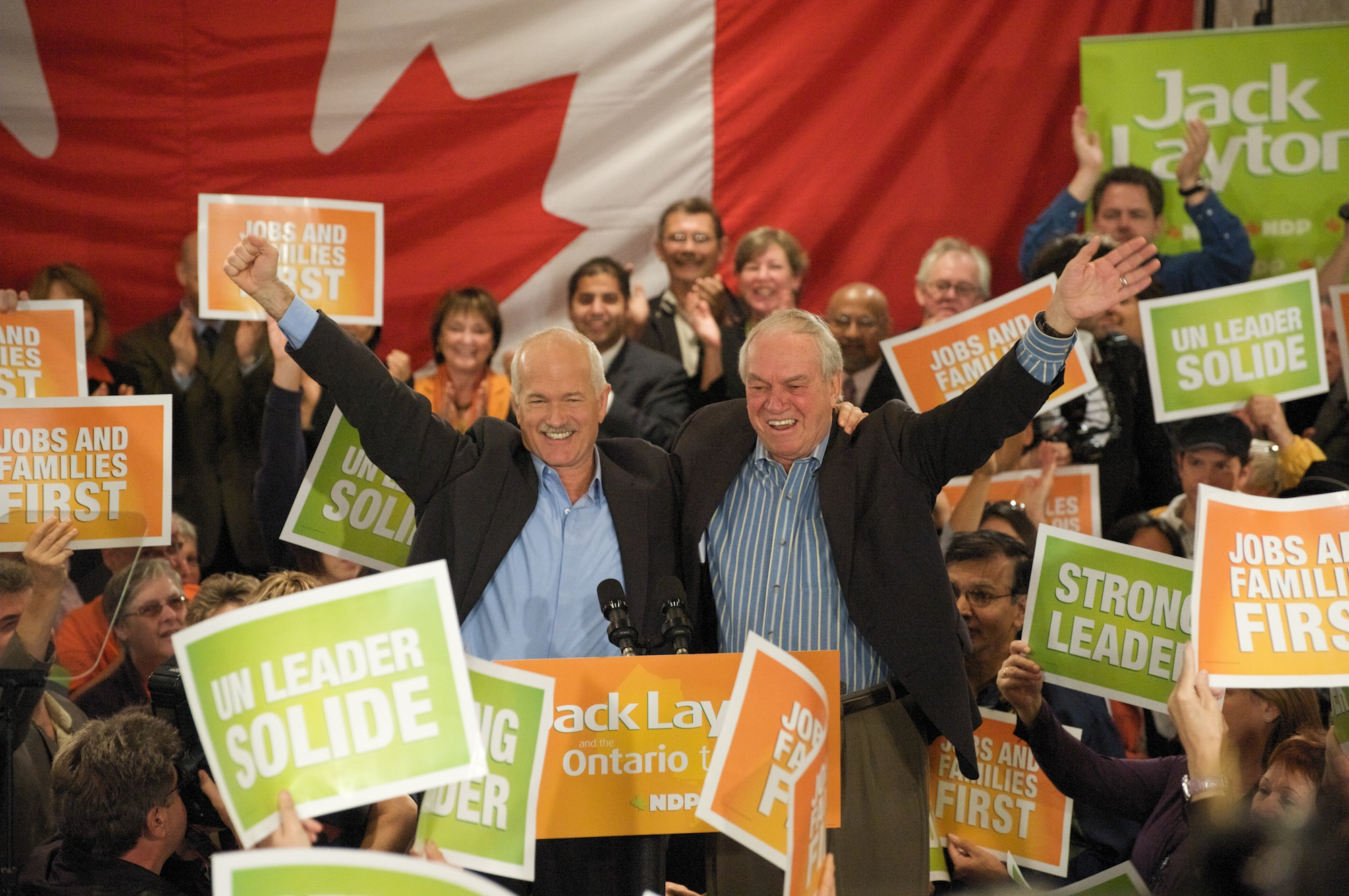
Ed Broadbent and Layton at a 2008 election rally in Toronto

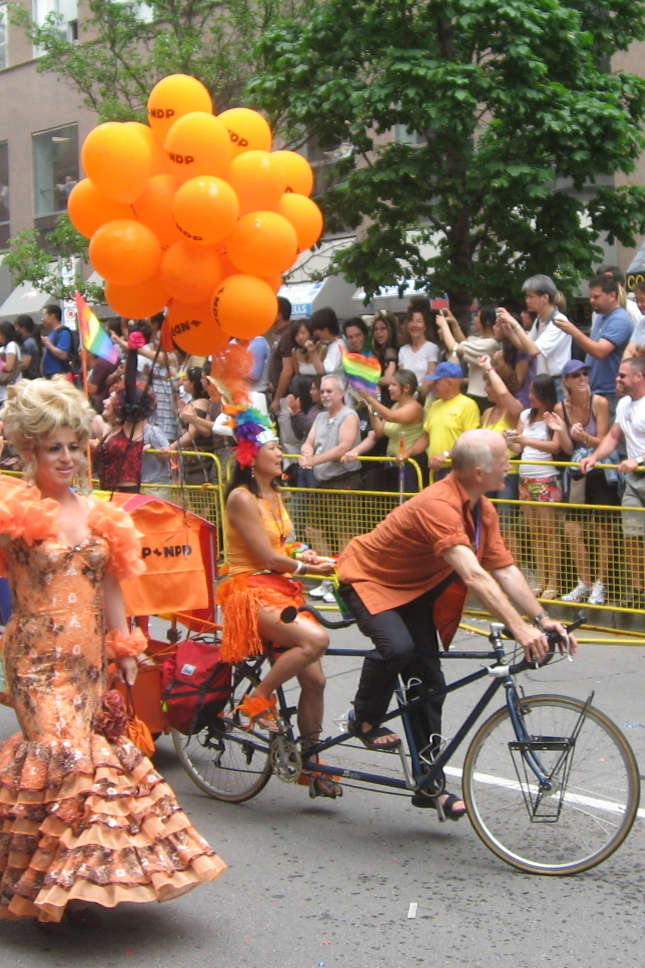
Layton with Olivia Chow at the 2008 Toronto Pride parade

Layton started off the 2008 federal election campaign with a speech similar to that of US presidential nominee Barack Obama. Layton denied he was trying to draw comparisons with Obama, saying "I mean, I am a lot shorter than he is. He is a brilliant orator. I'm never going to claim to be that. But what I have noticed is that the key issues faced by the American middle class, the working people of the U.S. and their concerns about their families' futures, are awfully similar to the issues that I hear in Canada." Layton said that he has also written to Obama and Hillary Clinton saying that the North American Free Trade Agreement had hurt working people in both countries "and those stories have to be told."

Layton, along with Prime Minister Harper and Bloc Québécois leader Gilles Duceppe, initially opposed the inclusion of Green Party leader Elizabeth May in the leaders' televised debates. Layton initially said that he was following the rules of the broadcast consortium, while NDP spokesman Brad Lavigne confirmed that Layton had refused to attend if May was present, noting that May had endorsed Liberal leader Stéphane Dion for prime minister, and arguing that her inclusion would in effect give the Liberals two representatives at the debate. Rod Love, former chief of staff to Ralph Klein, suggested that the Greens could potentially cut into the NDP's support. Layton's stance drew criticism from the YWCA, Judy Rebick, and members of his own party. Layton dropped his opposition to May's inclusion on September 10, 2008. "This whole issue of debating about the debate has become a distraction to the real debate that needs to happen", Layton said. "I have only one condition for this debate and that is that the prime minister is there."

In October 2008, Layton posted an online video message speaking out in favour of net neutrality, torrent sites, video-sharing sites, and social-networking sites. In a separate interview he said that increasing corporate control "is very, very dangerous and we have put the whole issue of net neutrality right into the heart of our campaign platform", and that the Internet is "a public tool for exchanging ideas and I particularly want to say that if we don't fight to preserve it, we could lose it." In the end, the NDP gained 8 new seats, taking its tally to 37. This result still left the NDP as Canada's fourth party, behind the Bloc Québécois with 50. The NDP managed to retain Outremont, held by Tom Mulcair, its only seat in the province.

=== 40th Canadian Parliament ===
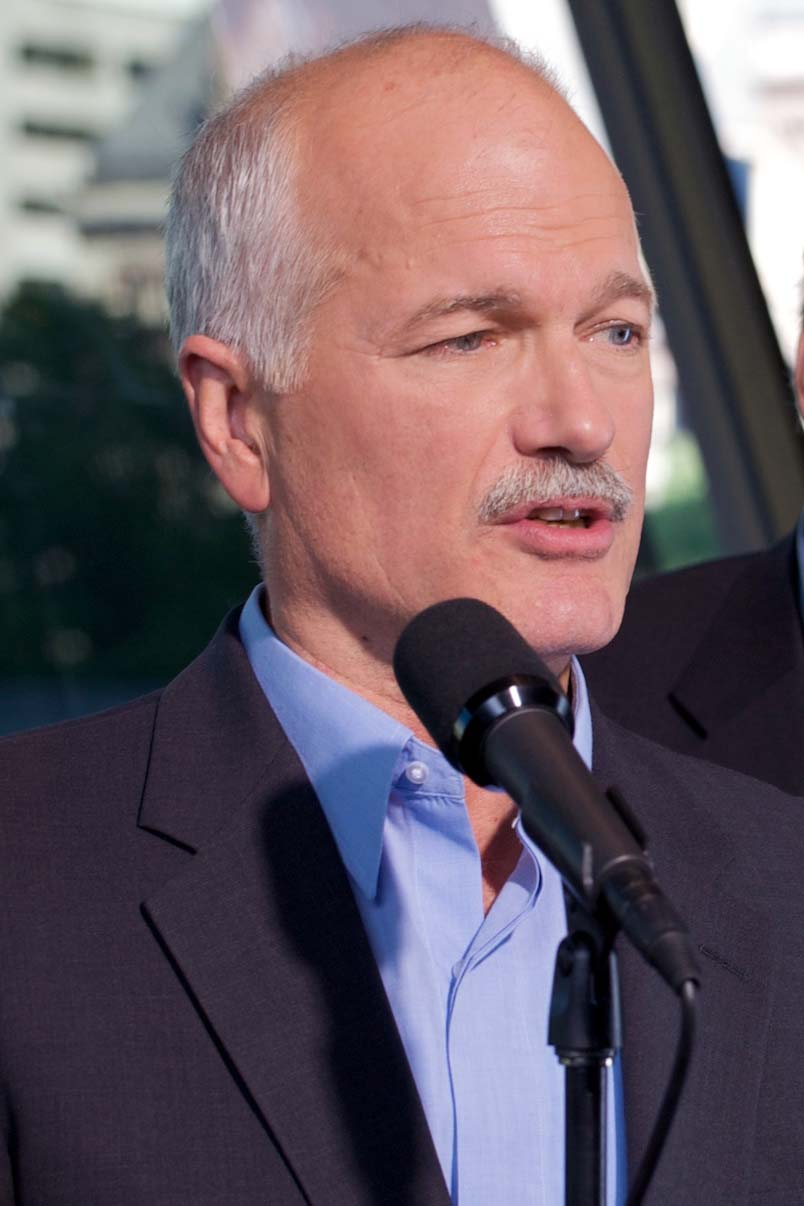
Layton during the 2008 election campaign

The 40th session of Parliament began on November 27, 2008, with a fiscal update by the Conservatives that outlined their agenda for the upcoming term. This included a temporary suspension of federal employees' right to strike and a removal of monetary subsidies for political parties. All three opposition parties including the NDP stated that they could not support this position. Layton along with Liberal leader Stéphane Dion and Bloc Québécois leader Gilles Duceppe began negotiations to form a coalition that would replace the Conservatives as the government. The three opposition parties planned to table a motion of non-confidence in the House of Commons, and counted on the likelihood that the Governor General Michaëlle Jean, would invite the coalition to govern instead of dissolving parliament and calling an election so soon after the last election.

On December 1, 2008, the three opposition leaders signed an accord that laid down the basis for an agreement on a coalition government. The proposed structure would be a coalition between the Liberals and the NDP, with the New Democrats getting six Cabinet positions. Both parties agreed to continue the coalition until June 30, 2011. The Bloc Québécois would not be formally part of the government but would provide support on confidence motions for 18 months.

Opposition to the proposed coalition developed in all provinces except Quebec. On December 4, 2008, the governor general granted Prime Minister Harper's request to prorogue Parliament until January 26, 2009, at which time Harper had planned to introduce the budget. Dion had since been ousted from the leadership of the Liberals and his successor, Michael Ignatieff, had distanced himself from the coalition.

Layton remained committed to ousting the Harper government, pledging that the NDP would vote against the Conservative budget regardless of what it contained. Layton urged Ignatieff's Liberal Party to topple the Conservatives before the shelf life of the coalition expired; constitutional experts said that four months after the last election, if the government fell, the governor general would likely grant the prime minister's request to dissolve Parliament instead of inviting the coalition.

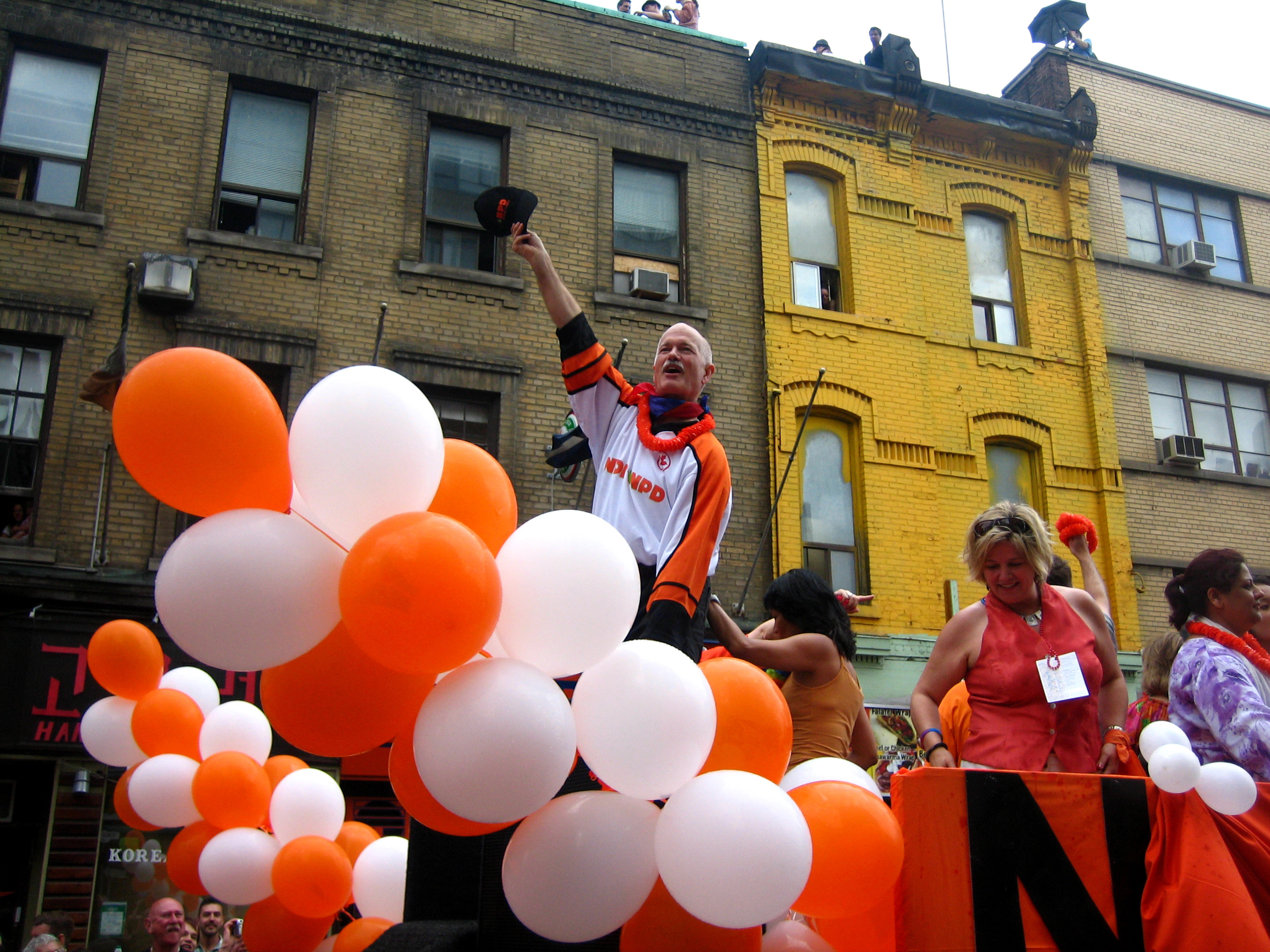
Layton making an appearance in Toronto's Pride Parade in 2009

On January 28, 2009, the Liberals agreed to support the Conservative budget with an amendment, ending the possibility of the coalition, so Layton said "Today we have learned that you can't trust Mr. Ignatieff to oppose Mr. Harper. If you oppose Mr. Harper and you want a new government, I urge you to support the NDP."

In March 2009, the NDP, under Layton's leadership, re-introduced a motion (first passed June 3, 2008) which, if implemented, would allow conscientious objectors to the Iraq War to remain in Canada. The motion again passed March 30, 2009, by 129–125, but it was non-binding. In a leadership review vote held at the NDP's August 2009 federal policy convention, 89.25% of delegates voted against holding a leadership convention to replace Layton. In October 2009, Layton paired up with the Stephen Lewis Foundation to raise money for HIV/AIDS affected families in Africa. As part of the foundation's A Dare to Remember campaign, Layton busked on a busy street corner.

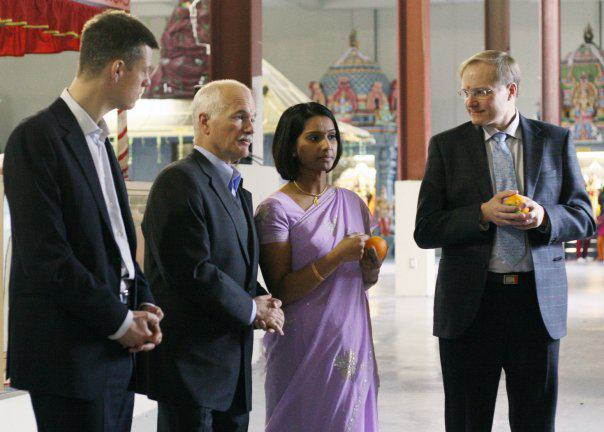
Layton and Rathika Sitsabaiesan with other NDP members observing Hindu religious rituals at Town Hall before attending a meeting organized by the Canadian Tamil community in 2010

Layton's son, Mike was elected to Toronto City Council in the 2010 city council election.

In early 2011, Layton was featured in an episode of CBC Television's Make the Politician Work.

The Conservative government was defeated in a no-confidence vote on March 25, 2011, with the motion gaining full support of all opposition parties including the New Democrats, after the government was found in contempt of Parliament. It was the first time in Commonwealth history that a government lost the confidence of the House of Commons on the grounds of contempt of Parliament. The no-confidence motion was carried with a vote of 156 in favour of the motion, and 145 against, thus resulting in the prime minister advising a dissolution of Parliament and a federal election.

=== 2011 election and Leader of the Opposition ===
The day after the successful passing of the motion, Layton started the NDP election campaign, first with a speech in Ottawa followed later in the day by an event in Edmonton, Alberta. Questions about Layton's health due to a recent hip surgery were often directed to him during the campaign, with Layton insisting that he was healthy enough to lead. On March 29, 2011, the New Democrats presented their first real campaign promise, a proposal to cap credit card rates to reduce credit card debt.

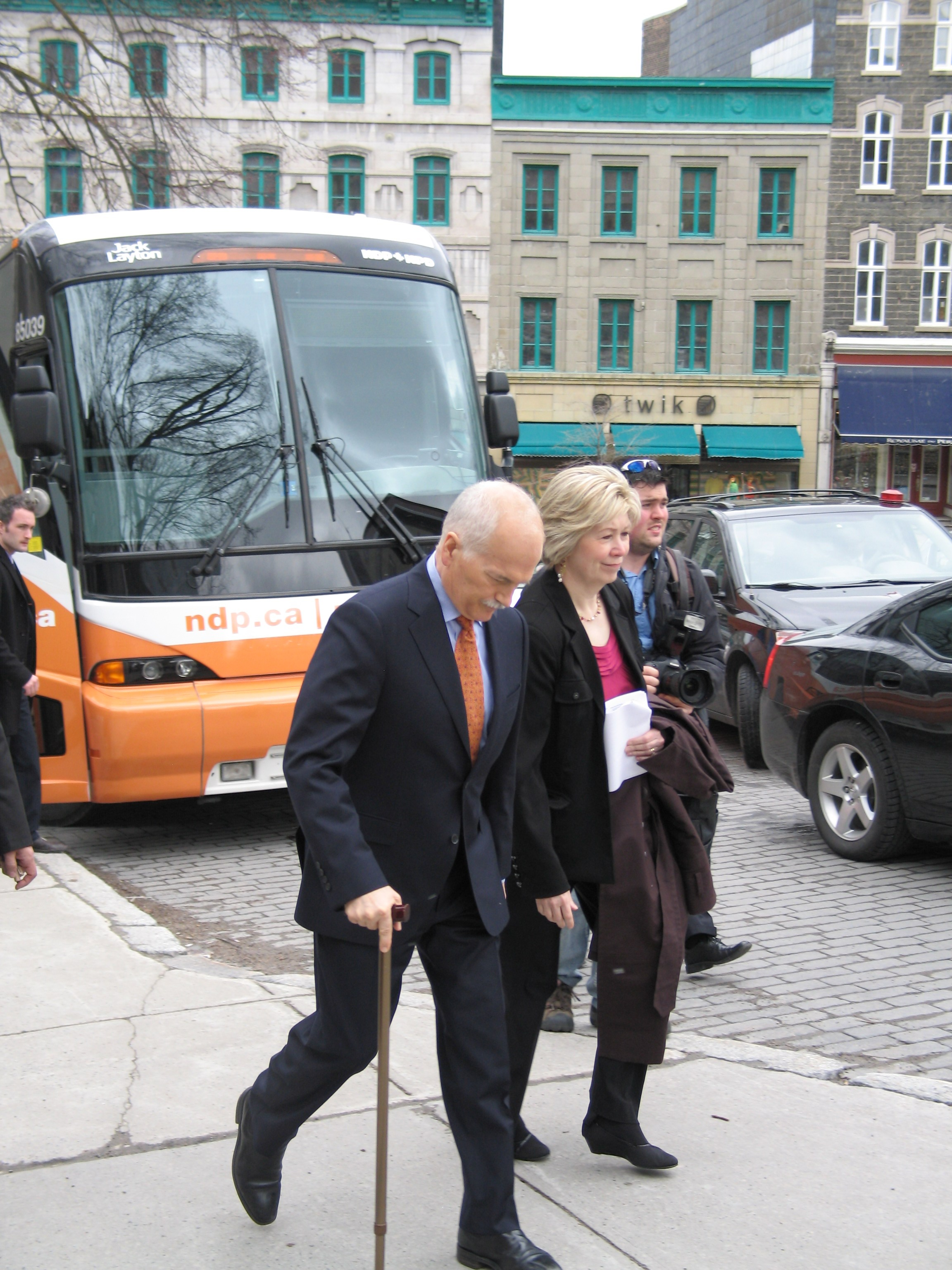
Layton with his chief of staff, Anne McGrath, campaigning in Quebec City

Unlike the previous election, Layton stated he was in favour of Green Party leader Elizabeth May speaking at the leaders debates, despite the fact that she was once again being discouraged by the Canadian media networks. The NDP also embarked upon the largest advertising campaign in its history, focusing on the Harper government's health care record. He also dedicated the federal election campaign to former Saskatchewan premier Allan Blakeney, who died about halfway through the campaign.

Despite entering the campaign with relatively low poll numbers, the NDP recovered and increased their support significantly after Layton's performance in the leaders debates. In the English-language debate, Layton criticized Michael Ignatieff's poor attendance record in the House of Commons, saying "You know, most Canadians, if they don't show up for work, they don't get a promotion!", to which Ignatieff was unable to respond effectively. The Globe and Mail described Layton's attack as a "knock-out punch" while the Toronto Star stated it was the "pivot in the debate [that] was a turning point in the federal campaign". Layton's New Democrats successfully capitalized on Ignatieff's attendance record in the Toronto area.

On February 4, 2011, Layton attended a rally against usage-based billing in Toronto with MPs Dan McTeague, Olivia Chow, Peggy Nash and others. His attendance at this rally was accompanied by several press releases by the NDP denouncing metered internet usage in Canada.

The NDP surge began in Quebec, with the NDP surprising many observers by surpassing the previously front-running Bloc in Quebec. In Canada overall, the NDP surged past the Liberals to take the second place behind the Conservatives; in Quebec, the NDP took first place. The NDP surge became the dominant narrative of the last week of the campaign, as other parties turned their attacks on the party and Layton.

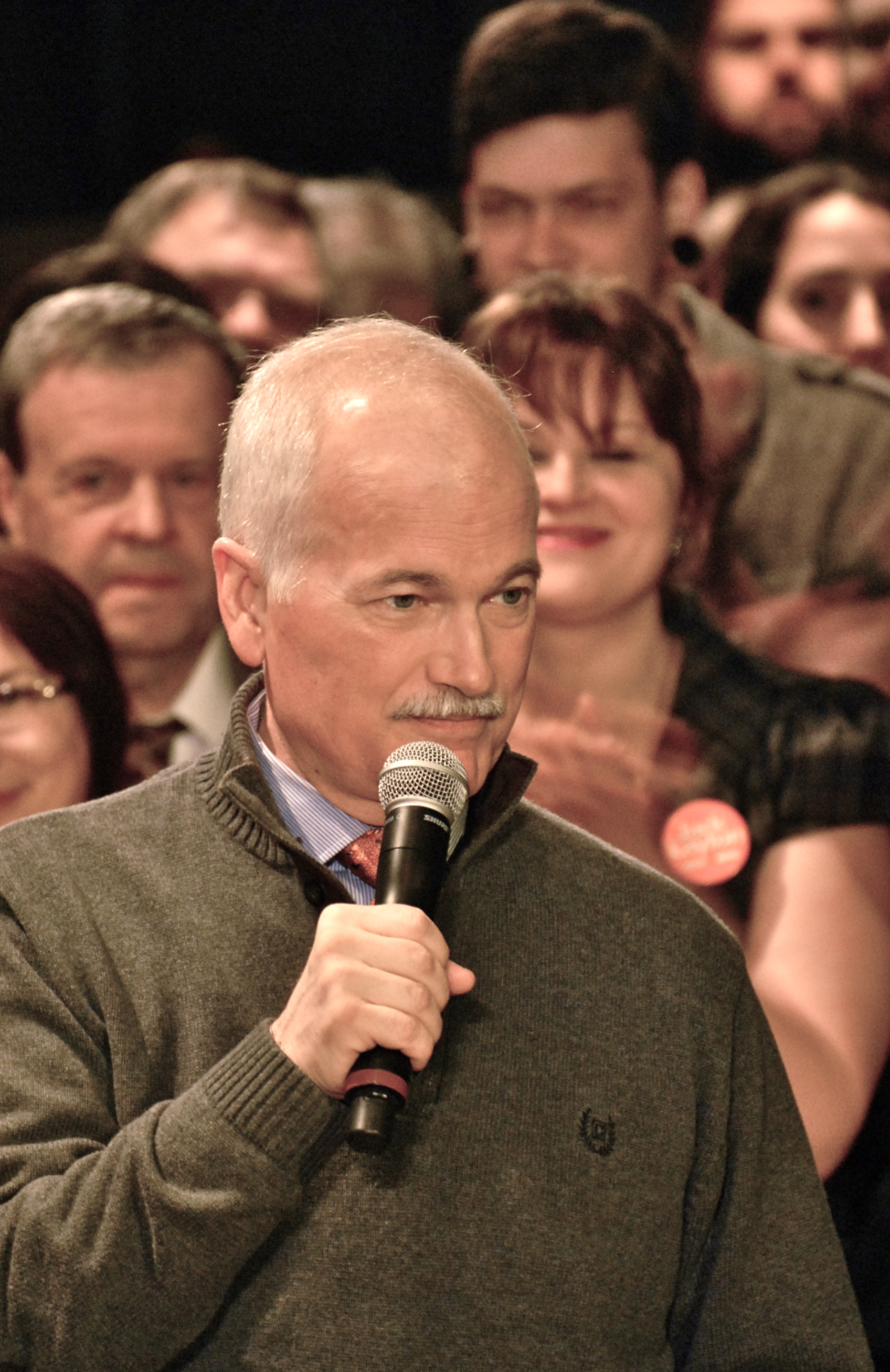
Layton in Quebec during the federal electoral campaign

On April 29, 2011, a retired police officer told the Sun News Network and the Toronto Sun newspaper that in 1996, Layton had been found in a massage parlour when police, looking for underage Asian sex workers, raided the establishment. The police informed Layton of the potentially questionable use of the business and recommended that he avoid it in the future. No charges were filed. The Sun later ran a follow-up piece, in which Toronto city councillor Giorgio Mammoliti criticized Layton. Layton has said there was no wrongdoing in the matter, saying that he simply "went for a massage at a community clinic" and did not return after the police advised him not to. He also referred to the release of the police report as a smear campaign against him. Bloc Québécois leader Gilles Duceppe also dismissed the claim. A columnist for the National Post suggested that it was a Liberal insider that leaked the story, although a Liberal Party spokesman denied that they had anything to do with it.

A subsequent Toronto Star column stated that most contributors to online discussions agreed there was a smear campaign against Layton. As for political damage from this story, that same day's update of the Nanos Leadership Index, which assesses public opinion on the Canadian federal leaders' trustworthiness, competence and vision for Canada, saw Layton rise from a score of 80 to a score of 97, surpassing Harper's 88 and Ignatieff's 39. The polling company speculated this improvement is due to strong sympathy by the public for a political candidate they judged as being unfairly maligned. The Toronto Police Service launched an investigation into how official police notes were leaked to Sun Media. Police notebooks are closely guarded and may contain unfounded and unproven allegations. On May 5, 2011, it was announced that no charges would be laid with regards to the leaked information.

Layton appeared on the Radio-Canada talk show Tout le monde en parle on April 3, an appearance that was credited for improving his party's standing among Francophone voters due to his informal Québécois French. The show is the most popular program in Quebec. He was also perceived to have performed well in the televised French-language party leaders' debate on April 13.

In the May 2, 2011, election, Layton led the NDP to 103 seats, more than double its previous high. This was also enough to make the NDP the Official Opposition for the first time. The NDP gains were partly due to a major surge in Quebec as the party won 59 of the province's 75 seats, dominating Montreal and sweeping Quebec City and the Outaouais, although the NDP also won more seats than any other opposition party in the rest of Canada. The NDP had gone into the election with only one seat in Quebec, that of Thomas Mulcair, and had won but a single seat in the province historically (Phil Edmonston in a 1990 by-election). Many of these gains came at the expense of the Bloc, which was reduced to a four-seat rump without official party status in Parliament.

== Family and personal life ==
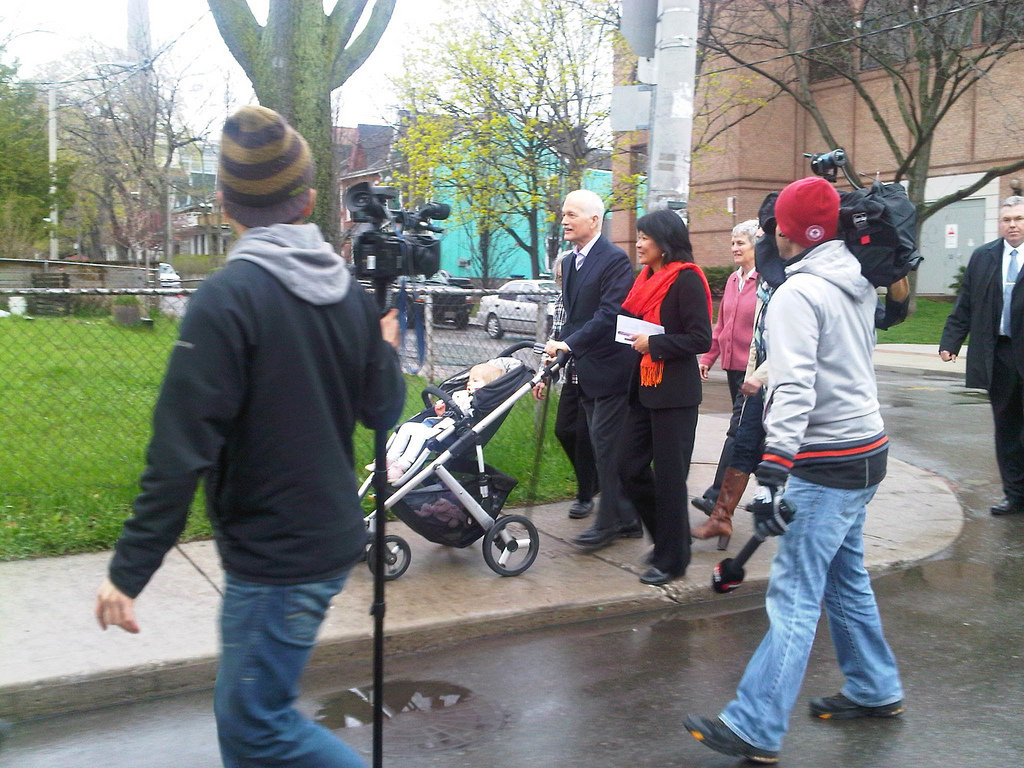
Layton and Olivia Chow on their way to vote in 2011

Layton came from a political family: his maternal great-granduncle, William Steeves, was a Father of Confederation. His great-grandfather, Philip E. Layton, was a blind piano salesman and activist who, in 1908, founded the Montreal Association for the Blind; in the 1930s, he campaigned for disability pensions. Philip was the senior partner in the family business, Layton Bros. Pianos. Layton Pianos had been made in London, England, since 1837, and Philip had emigrated to Montreal at the age of 19. His business, which was opened on Saint Catherine Street in Montreal, continues to operate as Layton Audio. Philip's 1898 composition Dominion March was played at Layton's lying in state.

Layton's grandfather, Gilbert, served in Quebec's Union Nationale government led by Maurice Duplessis as a cabinet minister, later resigning due to the provincial government's lack of support for Canadian participation in World War II. Layton's father, Robert, was initially a member of the Liberal Party as an activist in the 1960s and 1970s, who later switched to the Progressive Conservatives and served as a federal Cabinet minister in the 1980s under Prime Minister Brian Mulroney, as well as a member of Parliament.

Layton was raised as a member of the United Church of Canada, and was a member of Bloor Street United Church in Toronto. However, he also sometimes attended services at the Metropolitan Community Church of Toronto, whose pastor, Brent Hawkes, was a longtime NDP activist and a personal friend of Layton's.

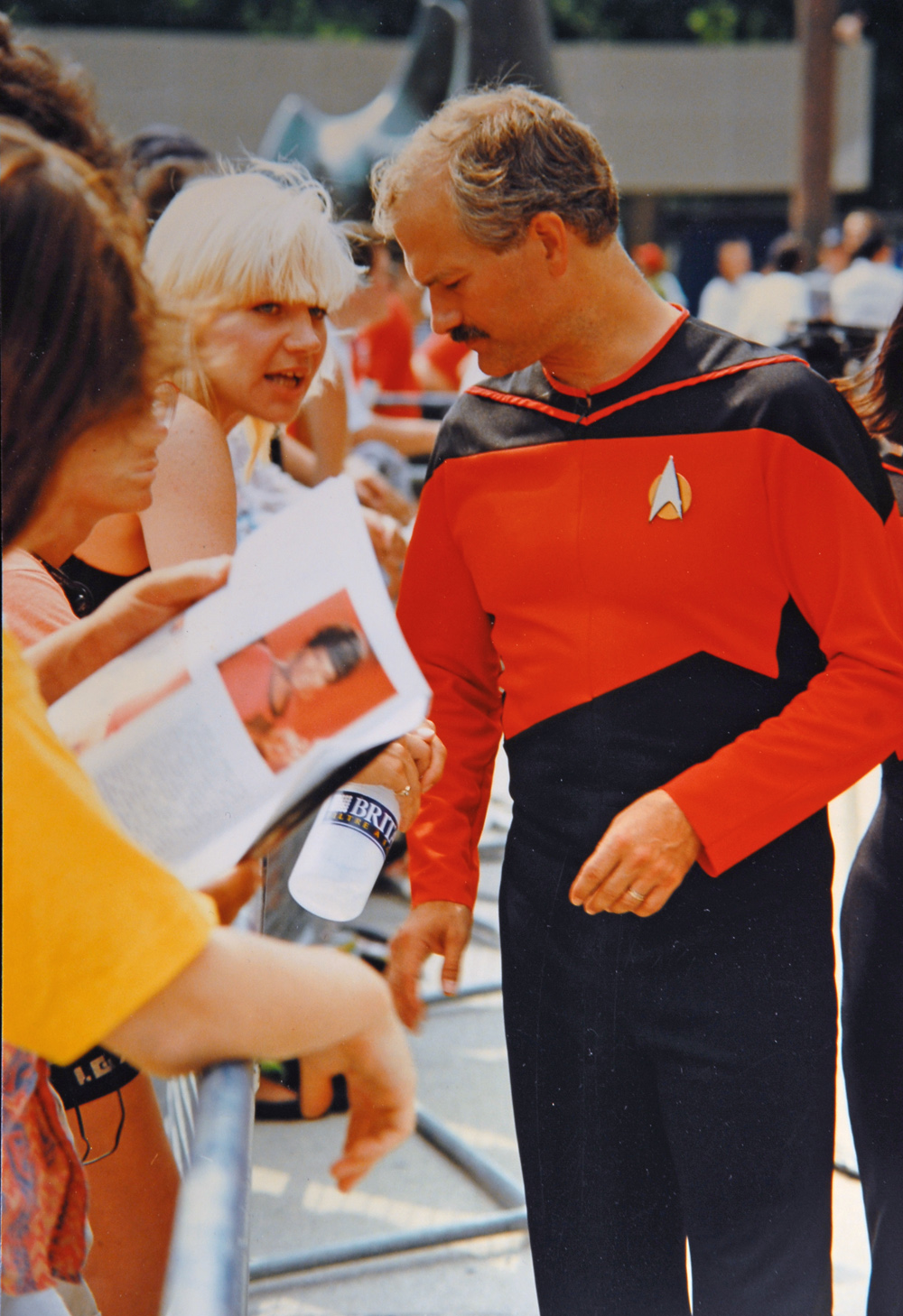
Layton wearing a custom-made uniform at a Star Trek convention in 1991

In 1969, at age 19, Layton married his high school sweetheart Sally Halford, with whom he had two children: Mike, who served as a Toronto city councillor from 2010 to 2022, and Sarah, who works for the Stephen Lewis Foundation. Layton and Halford's marriage ended in divorce in 1983 after 14 years.

Layton first met Olivia Chow in 1985 during an auction at Village by the Grange, in which he was the auctioneer and she was the interpreter for the Cantonese language observers. They had been previously acquainted, but realized that they were both candidates in the upcoming election and decided to have lunch together to talk about the campaign. Three weeks after the auction, they went on their first date. Olivia's mother did not approve of Layton at first, because of his race, as well as him not being a lawyer or doctor. Layton was invited to dinner at the home of Olivia's mother, where they also played mahjong. After the dinner, Layton attempted to thank Olivia's mother in Cantonese, but his use of an incorrect tone had him inadvertently saying, "Thank you for the good sex." "My faux pas broke the ice completely," he said later. "We've been good buddies ever since."

Layton was known for playing music and singing songs at party gatherings. Alberta NDP leader Brian Mason remembered during the three-day board meetings when Layton was running for president of the Federation of Canadian Municipalities: "He would gather people together in his hotel room and play the guitar and get everybody singing old folk songs from the 1960s. He just got people involved, just with his personality, not politics."

Layton was a keen Trekkie, having a custom Starfleet uniform made by a tailor. Layton was famously photographed wearing his uniform at a Star Trek convention in 1991.

At the 2005 Parliamentary Press Gallery Dinner (typically a satirical event), Layton sent up himself and his party, playing guitar and singing three songs: "Party for Sale or Rent" (to the tune of "King of the Road"), a re-worked version of "Nobody Knows You When You're Down and Out" with different humorous lyrics, and "If I Had Another $4.6 Billion".

== Illness and death ==
My friends, love is better than anger. Hope is better than fear. Optimism is better than despair. So let us be loving, hopeful and optimistic. And we'll change the world.

All my very best,

Jack Layton

— Final line of Layton's letter to Canadians

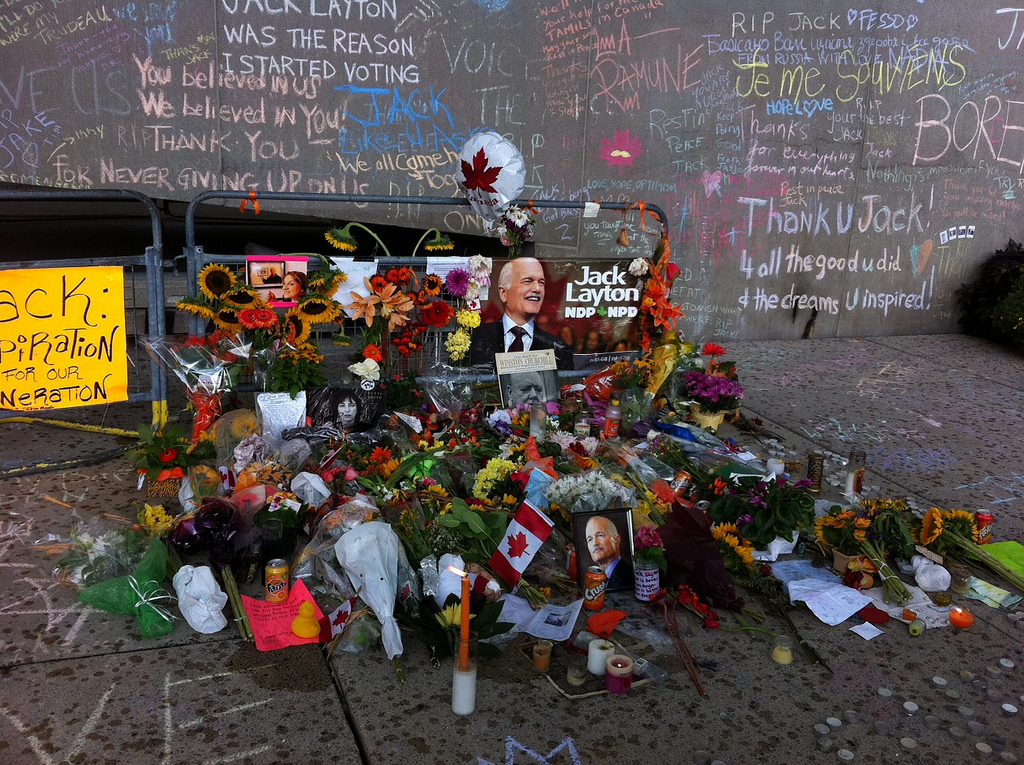
An impromptu memorial set up at Nathan Phillips Square shortly after his death

On February 5, 2010, Layton announced that he had been diagnosed with prostate cancer. He noted that his father Robert Layton had the same type of cancer 17 years before and recovered from it. His wife, Olivia Chow, had thyroid cancer a few years before. He vowed to beat the cancer, and said it would not interrupt his duties as member of Parliament or as leader of the NDP.

Following the 2011 federal election, Layton led the party into the first month of the new session of Parliament, as well as attending the NDP Federal Convention in Vancouver. After Parliament rose for the summer, Layton announced on July 25, 2011, that he would be taking a temporary leave from his post to fight an unspecified, newly diagnosed cancer. He was hoping to return as leader of the NDP upon the resumption of the House of Commons on September 19, 2011. Layton recommended that NDP caucus chair Nycole Turmel serve as interim leader during his leave of absence.

Layton died at 4:45 a.m. ET on August 22, 2011, at his home in Toronto. He was 61 years old.

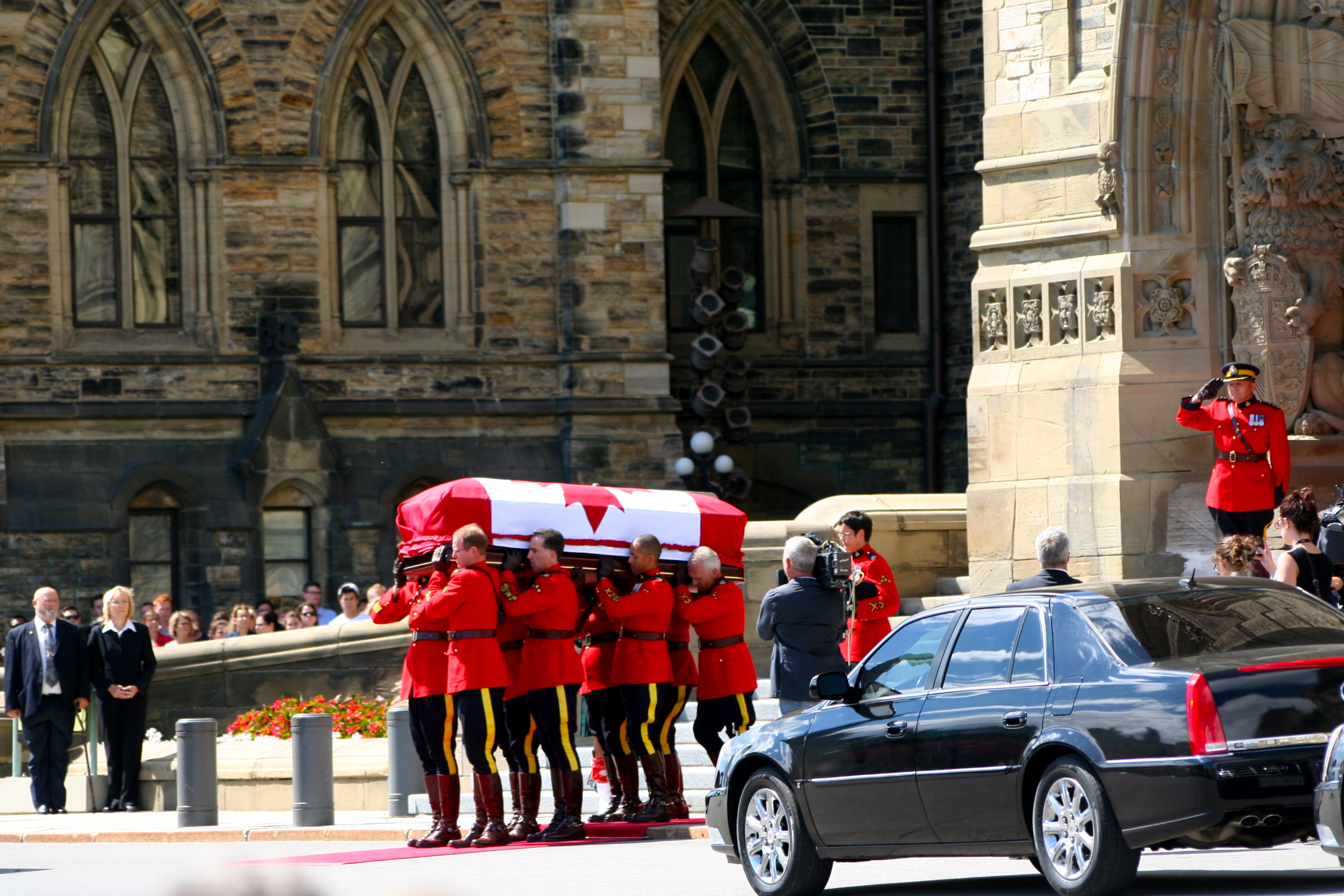
Layton's coffin being taken from Parliament Hill after lying in state in Ottawa

Upon hearing the news, there was a nationwide outpouring of grief, and Governor General David Johnston, Prime Minister Stephen Harper, NDP deputy leader Libby Davies, and the US ambassador to Canada, David Jacobson issued statements praising Layton and mourning his loss. Layton's family released an open letter, written by Layton two days before his death. In it, he expressed his wishes regarding the NDP's leadership in the event of his death, and addressed various segments of the Canadian population.

Layton was accorded a state funeral, which took place between August 25 and 27, 2011, with the final memorial service at Roy Thomson Hall in Toronto. Layton was the second leader of the Official Opposition to die while in office; the first, Sir Wilfrid Laurier, had been a former prime minister, and had been given a state funeral under the protocol for prime ministers. Layton was the first Official Opposition leader to die for whom a state funeral would not otherwise have been afforded, but Prime Minister Harper made the offer to Layton's widow who accepted. Layton's body was cremated following the funeral. A portion of his ashes was scattered under a jack pine planted on Toronto Island in his honour, with a second portion scattered at the Layton family's plot at Cote St. Charles United Church in Hudson, Quebec. A third portion was scattered under a memorial sculpted by Chow, placed at the Toronto Necropolis Cemetery on the first anniversary of his death.

== In popular culture ==
Layton's life is portrayed in a 2013 television movie entitled Jack, with Rick Roberts portraying Layton and Sook-Yin Lee as Olivia Chow. The cast also includes Wendy Crewson and Erin Karpluk. It was released on March 10, 2013, and aired on CBC Television.

== Electoral history ==
Electoral history of Jack Layton — NDP federal election performance as leader
Year	Type	Party	Votes			Seats		Position
Year	Type	Party	Total	%	±%	Total	±	Position
2004	Federal	New Democratic	2,127,403	15.68%	+7.17%	19 / 308	+6	Fourth party
2006	Federal	New Democratic	2,589,597	17.48%	+1.80%	29 / 308	+10	Fourth party
2008	Federal	New Democratic	2,515,288	18.18%	+0.70%	37 / 308	+6	Fourth party
2011	Federal	New Democratic	4,508,474	30.63%	+12.45%	103 / 308	+66	Official opposition

Electoral history of Jack Layton — Municipal and federal constituency elections
Year	Type	Riding	Party	Votes for Layton				Result	Swing
Year	Type	Riding	Party	Total	%	P.	±%	Result	Swing
1982	Toronto ward	Ward 6	Independent	9,892	27.39	2nd	-	Lost	-
1985	Toronto ward	Ward 6	Independent	9,037	62.63	1st	+35.24%	Elected	-
1988	Toronto ward	Ward 6	Independent	5,486	78.75	1st	+16.12%	Elected	-
1991	Toronto mayoral	N/A	New Democratic	64,044	32.88	2nd	-	Lost	-
1993	Federal general	Rosedale	New Democratic	5,547	10.78	4th	-4.28%	Lost	Gain
1994	Toronto ward	Ward 25	New Democratic	10,117	49.19	1st	-	Elected	-
1997	Federal general	Broadview—Greenwood	New Democratic	13,903	32.77	2nd	+18.82%	Lost	Hold
1997	Toronto ward	Ward 25	New Democratic	15,045	29.17	1st	-20.02%	Elected	-
2000	Toronto ward	Ward 30	New Democratic	8,671	59.74	1st	+30.57%	Elected	-
2004	Federal general	Toronto—Danforth	New Democratic	22,198	46.34	1st	+18.69%	Elected	Gain
2006	Federal general	Toronto—Danforth	New Democratic	24,412	48.42	1st	+2.08%	Elected	Hold
2008	Federal general	Toronto—Danforth	New Democratic	20,323	44.78	1st	−3.64%	Elected	Hold
2011	Federal general	Toronto—Danforth	New Democratic	29,235	60.80	1st	+16.02%	Elected	Hold

== Legacy and honours ==
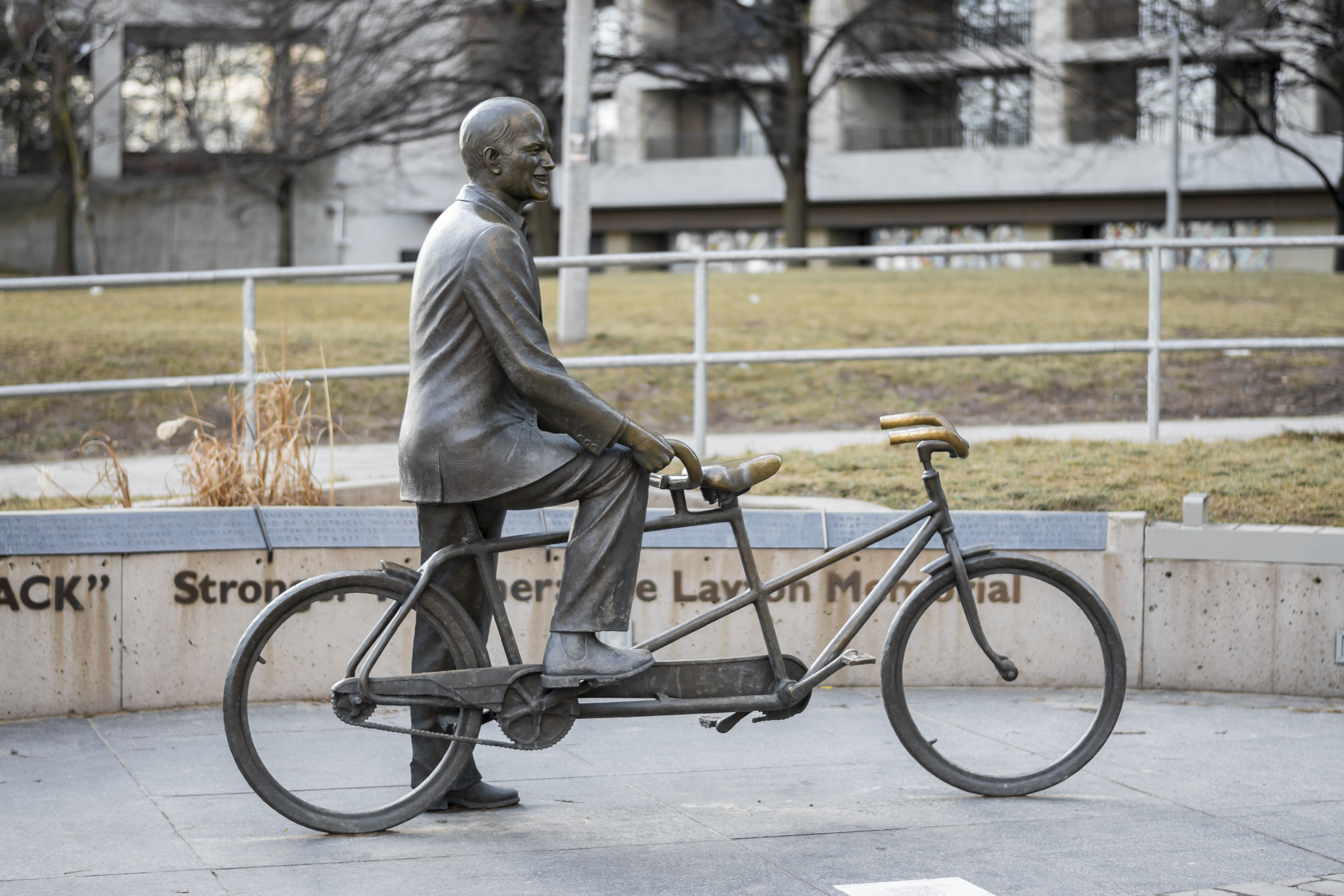
A memorial for Layton at the Jack Layton Ferry Terminal, which was renamed in his honour in 2013

- The Jack Layton Ferry Terminal in Toronto was renamed in Layton's honour in 2013, on the second anniversary of his death. A bronze statue of Layton riding on a tandem bicycle was installed at the site.
- Jack Layton Way in Toronto was named in 2013 (formerly Don Jail Roadway and parking area in front of the old jail). The street was once part of the driveway to the Don Jail and now being transformed as part of the Bridgepoint Health redevelopment in the Toronto neighbourhood of Riverdale; the community is in Layton's former electoral district of Toronto—Danforth. South side of the roadway is Toronto Public Library Riverdale Branch and Hubbard Park (named after William Peyton Hubbard.)
- Ryerson University (now Toronto Metropolitan University), where Layton was a professor for many years, honoured him by creating the Jack Layton Chair in the Department of Politics and Public Administration. The endowment sponsors several events including the annual Jack Layton Lecture series, the Jack Layton Book Club held in conjunction with Ryerson Archives and which holds discussions about various books that are part of the archive's Jack Layton Collection. As well, the chair sponsors the annual Jack Layton School for Leadership, an annual program aimed at building the leadership capacity of leaders and activists working towards social change.
- The Broadbent Institute awards an annual Jack Layton Progress Prize to "recognize the person or organization that has created and fielded an exceptional and successful campaign for progressive change."
- Parc Jack-Layton in Layton's hometown of Hudson, Quebec, was named in 2012. Previously known as Hudson Marina, the park is located by the shore of Lake of Two Mountains. Layton's widow, Olivia Chow, along with family members and MP Tom Mulcair, attended the renaming ceremony.
- A plaque commemorating Layton was unveiled in 2013 in Toronto's Withrow Park in front on an oak tree that was planted in his memory.
- The educational organization Learning for a Sustainable Future has established the LSF Jack Layton Award for Youth Action in Sustainability to honour schools that have "responded to community challenges with creativity, responsible citizenship and innovative action".
- Toronto's Woodgreen Community Services renamed their seniors' housing building at 1070 Queen Street East, Jack Layton Seniors' Housing in honour of Layton.
- The national headquarters of the federal NDP was named the "Jack Layton Building" after him.
- On 7 January 2017 he was posthumously awarded Meritorious Service Cross (MSC) by the Canadian Government.

== Selected works ==
- Layton, Jack (2000). Homelessness: The Making and Unmaking of a Crisis. Toronto: Penguin. ISBN 978-0-14-028888-9. OCLC 45045233.
- — (2004). Speaking Out: Ideas that Work For Canadians. Toronto: Key Porter Books. ISBN 978-1-55263-577-3. OCLC 53963558.
- — (2006). Speaking Out Louder: Ideas that Work For Canadians. Toronto: Key Porter Books. ISBN 978-1-55263-688-6. OCLC 62346602. (revised and expanded edition)

== Notes ==
Parliament of Canada
Preceded by Dennis Mills	Member of Parliament for Toronto—Danforth; 2004–2011	Succeeded by Craig Scott
Political offices
Preceded by Dan Heap	City Councillor for Ward 6 of the City of Toronto; 1982–1985	Succeeded by Dale Martin
Preceded by John Sewell	City Councillor for Ward 6 of the City of Toronto and Councillor of Metropolitan Toronto; 1985–1988	Moved to direct elections
Preceded by Dale Martin	City Councillor for Ward 6 of the City of Toronto; 1988–1991	Succeeded by Kyle Rae
Preceded by Roger Hollander	Councillor for Don River Ward of Metropolitan Toronto; 1994–1997	Office abolished
New creation	City Councillor for Ward 25 (Don River) of the City of Toronto; 1997–2000	Office abolished
New creation	City Councillor for Ward 30 (Broadview-Greenwood) of the City of Toronto; 2000–2003	Succeeded by Paula Fletcher
Preceded by Michael Ignatieff	Leader of the Opposition; 2011	Succeeded by Nycole Turmel
Party political offices
Preceded by Alexa McDonough	Leader of the New Democratic Party; 2003–2011	Succeeded by Nycole Turmel interim
