= Gilbert Layton =

Canadian politician and businessman

Minister without portfolio
- In office August 26, 1936 – October 5, 1939 Serving with Antonio Élie, Thomas J. Coonan, Thomas Chapais
- Premier: Maurice Duplessis
- Preceded by: Position established
- Succeeded by: Position abolished

Member of the Legislative Assembly of Quebec for Montréal–Saint-Georges
- In office August 17, 1936 – October 25, 1939
- Preceded by: Charles Ernest Gault
- Succeeded by: George Gordon Hyde (Westmount–Saint-Georges)

Personal details
- Born: November 5, 1899 Montreal, Quebec, Canada
- Died: May 29, 1961 (aged 61) Montreal, Quebec, Canada
- Resting place: Mount Royal Cemetery
- Party: Union Nationale
- Spouse: Norah Lestelle England
- Children: Robert Layton
- Occupation: Politician
- Profession: Merchant; businessman; activist

Gilbert Layton (November 5, 1899 – May 29, 1961) was a Canadian politician and businessman in Quebec, Canada.

== Background ==
Layton was born in Montreal, Quebec, the son of Alice Marion (Gilbert) and Philip Edward David Layton, who were English immigrants. His father was a blind activist who led a campaign for disability pensions in the 1930s. Gilbert was a merchant and business executive in the family firm of Layton Brothers (founded 1887, now as Layton Audio) from 1918 to 1932. He married Norah Lestelle England (daughter of Arthur John England and Florence Louise Grimmett) on February 18, 1921.

== Member of the legislature ==
Gilbert Layton was elected to Quebec's legislative assembly in the riding of Montréal–Saint-Georges in 1936 as a member of the Union Nationale, a conservative party. He served as minister without portfolio in the government of Maurice Duplessis until resigning in 1939 to protest the Quebec government's opposition to conscription in World War II. He ran for re-election to the legislature as an independent candidate that year and was defeated.

== Federal politics ==
In the 1945 federal election, he ran as an Independent Progressive Conservative for the Mount Royal seat in the House of Commons of Canada, but was defeated. He placed fourth behind the Liberal victor, the official Progressive Conservative Party of Canada candidate and the Co-operative Commonwealth Federation (CCF) candidate.

== Death ==
Layton died in Montreal and is buried at Mount Royal Cemetery.

== Descendants ==
Gilbert Layton's son, Robert Layton, served as a federal Progressive Conservative cabinet minister in the 1980s. His grandson, Jack Layton, was the leader of the federal New Democratic Party from 2003 to 2011, and was Leader of the Official Opposition for a short time in 2011 until he died in office. His great-grandson is Toronto City Councillor Mike Layton.
