= Layton House =

Historic house in Maryland, United States

- U.S. National Register of Historic Places
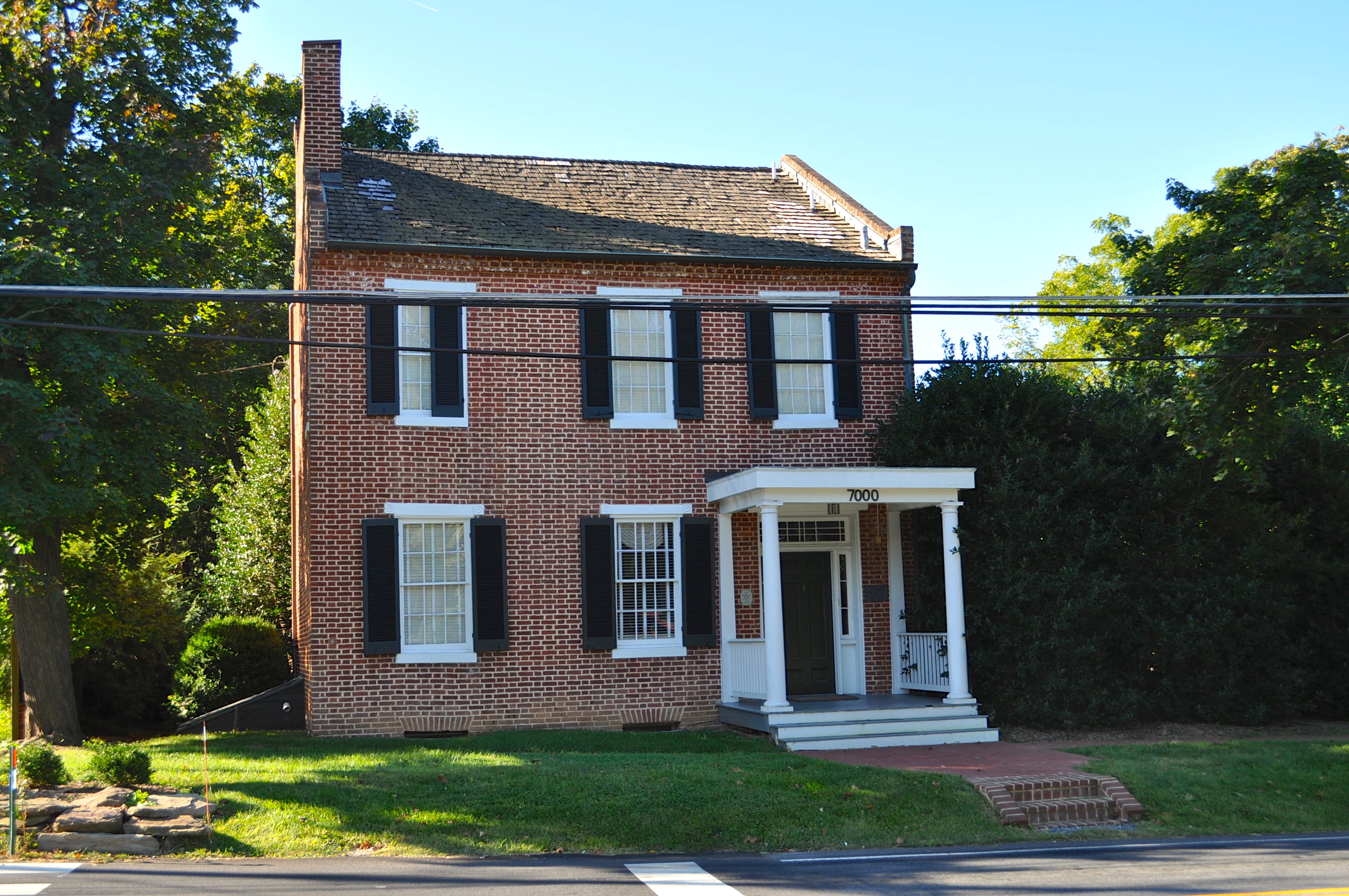
- Layton House, September 2012

- Location within Maryland Location within the United States
- Location: SW corner MD 108 and MD 420, Laytonsville, Maryland
- Coordinates: 39°12′42″N 77°8′35″W
- Area: less than one acre
- Built: 1793
- Architectural style: Federal
- NRHP reference No.: 75000911
- Added to NRHP: September 25, 1975

The Layton House is a historic home located at Laytonsville, Montgomery County, Maryland, United States. It was built in 1793 and is a two-story brick Federal-style house with a three-bay Flemish bond main (north) facade and a gable roof.

The Layton House was listed on the National Register of Historic Places on September 25,

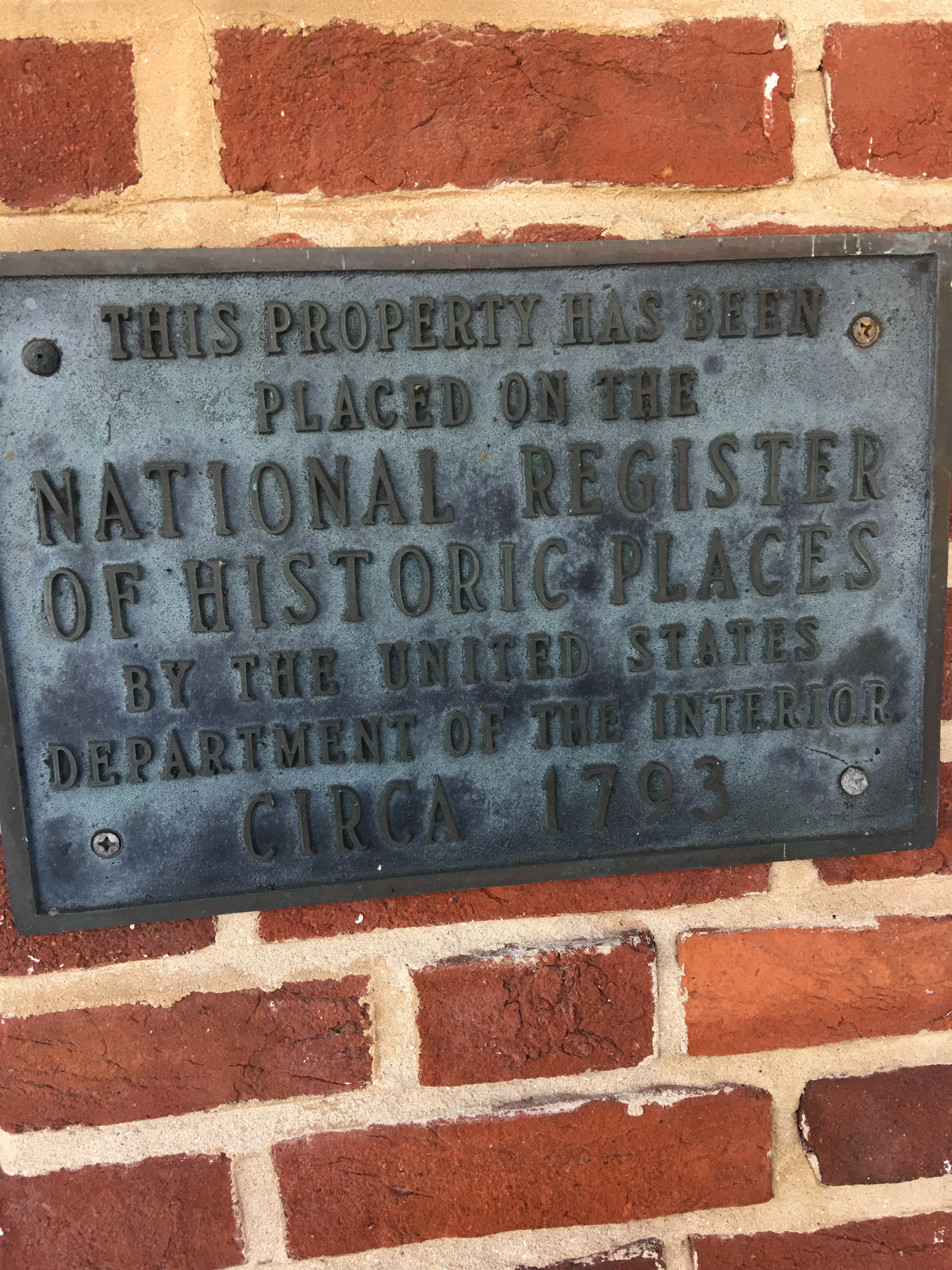

1975.
