= Jane Leighton =

English health campaigner (1944–2012)

- Born: 17 March 1944; Hemsby, Norfolk, England
- Died: 4 July 2012 (aged 68); Zürich, Switzerland
- Occupations: Healthcare campaigner, television producer
- Years active: 1960s – 2012

Jane Leighton (17 March 1944 – 4 July 2012) was an English healthcare campaigner and television producer. The oldest of three children, she abandoned school halfway through her studies to take up a secretarial course and her first job was as the secretary to the managing director of Anglia Television. Leighton's campaigning on healthcare issues began in 1974 at the British Pregnancy Advisory Service and successfully campaigned for improvements to services lacking their own lobbying group at the Liverpool Community Health Council. Her efforts impressed Granada Television who invited her to work on the news programme World in Action.

Leighton worked at the Littlewoods retail company to devise an equal opportunities employment system which won her an award and was later employed by Mersey Television as the general manager for the Channel 4 soap opera Brookside. She returned to Granada in 1990 as head of public affairs and helped the company retain its television franchise. After leaving in 1992, Leighton embarked on a portfolio career which saw her serve as either a member or chair of various organisations. She joined Dignitas after learning of cancer in February and travelled to Switzerland where she took her own life five months later.

== Biography ==
=== Early life and career ===
Leighton was born on 7 March 1944 at the Hill Garden Nursing Home in Hemsby, Norfolk. She was the oldest of three children to the agricultural labourer Robert Henry William Palmer and his wife Doris Maud, née Hunn. Leighton had one sister and one brother. Her parents lived at 22A High Street in Caister-on-Sea at the time of her birth and later operated a post office and stationers in the town. Leighton went to the Great Yarmouth High School for Girls but abandoned her studies partway through so she could take up a secretarial course. She then became a secretary to the managing director of Anglia Television Dick Joice. It was at Anglia Television that Leighton met the electrical engineer Bernard Leighton and the two were married in Norwich on 4 June 1966.

She took on the care of her husband's two children from a previous marriage and stopped working so that she could become a 'company wife' which involved moving around the country. This remained the case until Leighton separated from Bernard in 1971 and continued to care for the children there after. The marriage was later dissolved. She found work at the British Pregnancy Advisory Service in Liverpool and later became a secretary to the Liverpool Community Health Council from 1974 and 1979. At the council, Leighton actively campaigned for improvements to services that lacked their own lobbying group. New resources were dedicated to healthcare for homelessness people, those suffering from mental illness and for women exercising their right to selection as a consequence of her campaigning.

Leighton's efforts impressed television producers who invited her to become a reporter and researcher for the nightly news programme for the north-west of England, World in Action, on Granada Television. One of the programmes, These Are My Children (1981), she made it possible for Anwar Ditta to bring her three children from Pakistan into the United Kingdom in spite of immigration officials claiming she was not their biological mother. The programme won Leighton a Royal Television Society Award for Journalism. She remained in contact with Ditta for the rest of her life. Leighton moved onto medical programmes for Granada and Channel 4 and they earned her an award from the British Medical Association in 1983. One noted programme she fronted concerned the dangers of secondhand cigarette smoke. Another focused dioxin leak affecting thousands of people in and around Seveso in Northern Italy in 1976 and another was about the inadequate healthcare prisoners received.

=== Later career and final years ===
The obstetrician Wendy Savage was suspended from her post at the London Hospital Medical College in 1985 on incompetence grounds. Leighton was a major role in supporting Savage and wrote three articles for the New Statesman in which she interviewed several people in Tower Hamlets. She contributed to Savage's later account of her suspension in a book entitled A Savage Enquiry in 1986 but Leighton did not wish for her name to be on the book as it failed to meet her meticulous standards of editing. The Littlewoods retail company approached her in 1985 and asked Leighton to devise an equal opportunities employment system for them. Leighton won a reward for her work in 1987 from Women in Management and the system was completed the following year. After this she worked for the production company Mersey Television as a general manager on the Channel 4 soap opera Brookside from 1988 to 1990.

Leighton returned to Granada to 1990 as head of public affairs. She helped the company retain its franchise after a rival bid was made from a consortium led by Mersey Television but resigned in 1992 after the chairman David Plowright was ousted by Gerry Robinson. Leighton embarked on a portfolio career which saw her become the industrial relations consultant for the Liverpool Housing Action Trust (1992–1996), chaired Salford's NHS mental health trust between 1993 and 1995, she was a member of the Broadcasting Complaints Commission of which she chaired from 1996 to 1997 having been a member for three years prior and served as deputy chair of its successor, the Broadcasting Standards Commission between 1997 and 2001. Leighton also served as chair of the Tate Britain's organisational development which saw her install a new organisational system which prevented staff from being alienated.

She also was on the board of the Royal Liverpool Philharmonic Orchestra from 1990 and 1992, served as a member of the North-West Arts Board and was the University College of Salford's governor between 1992 and 1995. Leighton was also a non-executive director of the Hallé Concerts Society from 1992 and 1995 as well as the City of London Sinfonia between 1992 and 1997. Her interest in mental health led her to join the Camden and Islington area mental health committee in 1998 and served in this capacity until 2000. Leighton also was the non-executive director of the Camden and Islington NHS Foundation Trust between 1998 and 2001 and the job saw her work closely with the police, social services and the National Health Service after starting the London Mental Health Learning Partnership in 2000.

After she was diagnosed with rectal cancer which was later surgically removed in 2003, Leighton elected to move to Suffolk. There she was made the chair of the Waveney Primary Care NHS Trust and served in this position from 2003 and 2006. Leighton founded a new organisation called Halesworth Health which aimed to improve and protect local services in the town and developed the organisation's website. Despite lung secondaries in 2005, which could not be mended in surgery, she turned down chemotherapy and they did not progress. Leighton's last campaigning success came in 2006 when she ensured the merger that made up the Great Yarmouth and Waveney primary care trust was not taken up at the time into the bigger economies for scale sought by the government.

She still remained actively involved in the running of Halesworth Health in spite of the diagnosis of brain secondaries in February 2012 which left her unable to walk. Leighton joined Dignitas upon her being diagnosed with cancer and travelled to Switzerland. There, she felt her mental and physical functions declining in spite of having steroid treatment. The day before her death, a fingernail which had been painted with an elaborate pattern broke and Leighton insisted a nailbar be found to ensure it could be repaired. She committed suicide in a Dignitas clinic in Zürich on 4 July 2012. Her ashes were scattered in the Swiss mountains. Leighton requested that no funeral services be held for her but agreed for an informal gathering where her friends and relatives remembered her life at Southwold beach. She was survived by her adoptive children and her siblings.
