= Edward Leighton =

Edward Leighton may refer to:

- Edward Leighton (died 1593), MP for Shropshire
- Sir Edward Leighton, 1st Baronet (c. 1650 – 1711), MP for Shropshire
- Sir Edward Leighton, 2nd Baronet (1681–1756), of the Leighton Baronets
