= Mike Layton =

Canadian politician (born 1978)

- Layton in 2026

Toronto City Councillor
- Incumbent
- Assumed office November 15, 2026
- Preceded by: Dianne Saxe
- Constituency: Ward 11 University—Rosedale
- In office December 1, 2018 – November 15, 2022
- Preceded by: Ward established
- Succeeded by: Dianne Saxe
- Constituency: Ward 11 University—Rosedale
- In office December 1, 2010 – December 1, 2018
- Preceded by: Joe Pantalone
- Succeeded by: Ward dissolved
- Constituency: Ward 19 Trinity—Spadina

Personal details
- Born: Michael Robert Arthur Layton; November 16, 1978 (age 48) North York, Ontario, Canada
- Party: Independent
- Other political affiliations: New Democratic
- Spouse: Brett Tryon (m. 2012)
- Children: 2
- Parents: Jack Layton (father); Sally Halford (mother)
- Relatives: Olivia Chow (stepmother) other relatives
- Education: University of Toronto (BA); York University (MA)
- Occupation: Politician
- Website: www.mikelayton.ca

Michael Robert Arthur Layton (born November 16, 1978) is a Canadian politician who represents Ward 11 University—Rosedale on Toronto City Council. Layton represented Ward 19 Trinity—Spadina from 2010 to 2018 and its successor Ward 11 University—Rosedale from 2018 to 2022. He did not run for re-election 2022, becoming the chief sustainability officer at York University in March 2023. Layton was re-elected to his former city council seat in the 2026 Toronto municipal election.

== Early life and education ==
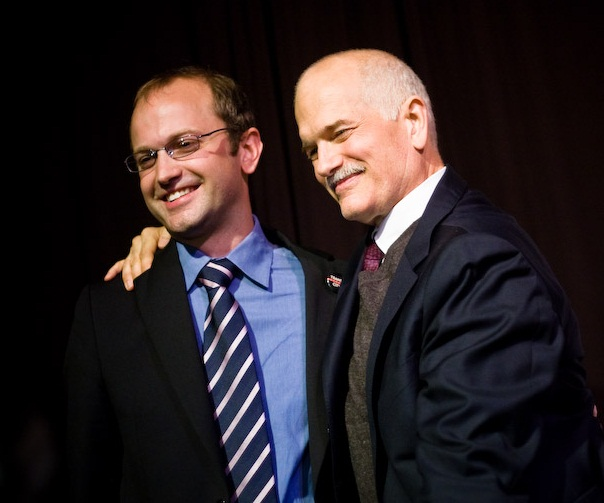
Mike Layton at his campaign party with his father, Jack Layton.

Michael Layton was born on November 16, 1978, to Jack Layton and his first wife Sally Halford, and is the step-son of Layton's second wife, current Mayor of Toronto, and former NDP Member of Parliament for Trinity—Spadina and city councillor, Olivia Chow.

Layton has a Bachelor of Arts degree in political science and environmental management from the University of Toronto, where he was a member of Kappa Sigma fraternity, and a Master of Environmental Studies from York University. After graduating, he worked for Environmental Defence, a national environmental charity eventually becoming deputy outreach director. He was also the coordinator for the Green Energy Act Alliance. He worked as a bartender and manager at a restaurant on King Street West for six years.

== Political career ==
Layton in 2014

In 2010, he ran as a candidate in Ward 19 to replace Joe Pantalone who retired to run for mayor. Layton won the election with more than double the vote total of his closest rival, Karen Sun.

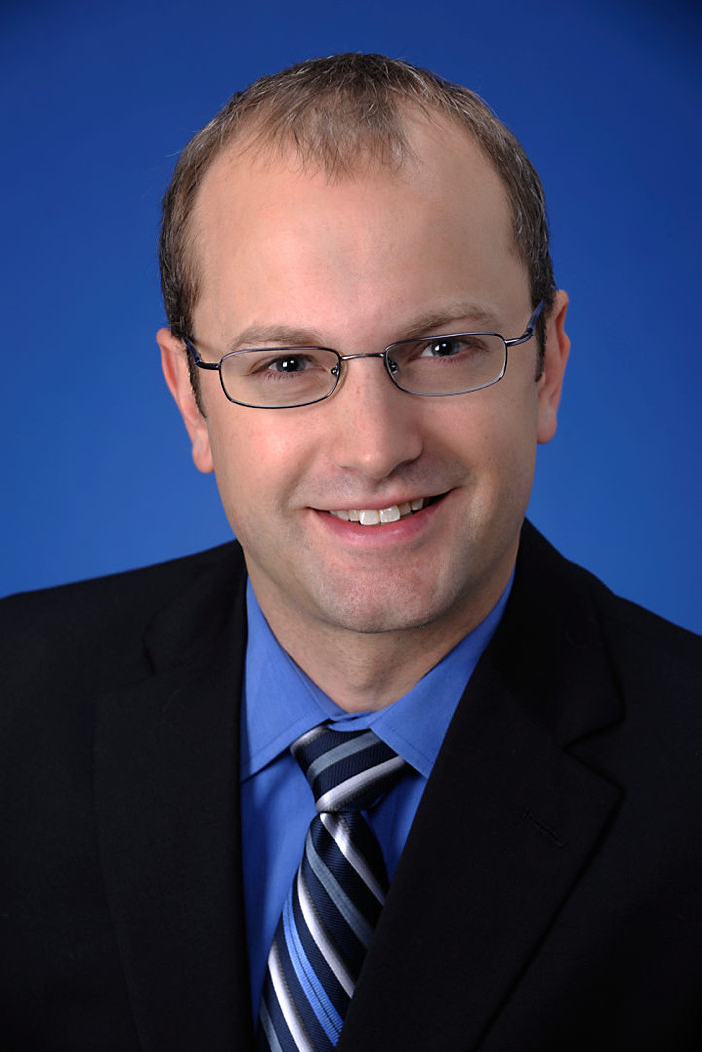
Layton's official portrait in 2010

In 2011, Layton opposed spending cuts by Mayor Rob Ford. He worked to preserve a women's shelter and a community pool in Stanley Park.

In 2011, Layton took issue with an advertisement for the Toronto Argonauts. Layton claimed that it condoned domestic violence. The football team subsequently replaced the advertisement.

Layton was a critic of plans to build a casino resort in downtown Toronto in 2012. His motion opposing the Ontario Lottery and Gaming Commissions casino expansion plans passed 40–4 in the Toronto City Council.

Working with residents in the Liberty Village neighbourhood in Toronto, Layton worked to try to get cheaper fares on the regional transit system GO Transit to improve public transit in downtown Toronto.

For the gold medal hockey game in the 2014 Winter Olympics, Layton gained passage of a motion to allow bars to open earlier to serve alcohol during the game.

In March 2019, Layton has put forward a motion, which was seconded by Mike Colle, to study the idea of suing oil companies over climate change.

Layton was highly critical of the clearing of the homeless encampment at Lamport Stadium in 2021, referring to it as "extremely disappointing and disturbing" and stating "There is something fundamentally wrong with the use of violence or the threat of violence in order to further criminalize homelessness in our city." In July 2022, Layton announced he would not stand for re-election as ward 11 city councillor, citing family reasons.

The Toronto Star reported in July 2026 that Layton was mulling standing for the New Democratic Party in the 2026 Beaches—East York federal by-election, prompted by the resignation of Liberal MP Nate Erskine-Smith. However, at the end of July, he decide against running and the NDP appointed their candidate from the 2025 election, Shannon Devine. In August, Layton announced that he would seek his former city council seat in the 2026 Toronto municipal election. He won the Ward 11 election with 19,388 votes, defeating runner-up Diana Yoon.

== Personal life ==
Layton married his wife Brett Tryon, a program coordinator for the charity Environmental Defence Canada, on Toronto Island in August 2012, near the location where Jack Layton and Olivia Chow were married in 1988.

He is the great-great-great-nephew of William Steeves, a Father of Confederation.

In the 2013 CBC Television film Jack, he is portrayed by Conrad Sweatman as an adult and Mitchell Kummen as a child.

== Election results ==
2026 Toronto municipal election, Ward 11 University—Rosedale
Candidate	Votes	Vote share
Mike Layton	19,388	46.22%
Diana Yoon	8,003	19.08%
Karina Lemke	5,540	13.21%
Terri Hawkes	3,782	9.02%
Alice Li	2,877	6.86%
Keenan Courtis	1,568	3.74%
Gian Pileri	425	1.01%
Paul Viret	236	0.56%
Huy Lieu	125	0.30%
Source: City of Toronto

2018 Toronto municipal election, Ward 11 University—Rosedale
Candidate	Votes	Vote share
Mike Layton	22,370	69.56%
Joyce Rowlands	4,231	13.16%
Nicki Ward	2,933	9.12%
Marc Cormier	995	3.09%
Michael Borrelli	671	2.09%
Michael Shaw	581	1.81%
George Sawision	376	1.17%
Total	32,157	100%
Source: City of Toronto

2014 Toronto election, Ward 19
Candidate	Votes	%
Mike Layton	21,014	83.66%
Scott Bowman	2,490	9.91%
Albina Burello	964	3.84%
George Sawision	649	2.58%
Total	25,117	100%

2010 Toronto election, Ward 19
Candidate	Votes	%
Mike Layton	9,125	45.387%
Karen Sun	4,207	20.925%
Sean McCormick	3,650	18.155%
Jim Likourezos	1,313	6.531%
David Footman	518	2.576%
Karlene Nation	417	2.074%
Rosario Bruto	398	1.98%
George Sawision	356	1.771%
Jason Stevens	121	0.602%
Total	20,105	100%
