= Robert Leighton (broadcaster) =

- Born: 1956; Devon
- Died: 17 January 2008
- Occupations: broadcaster, DJ

Robert Leighton (died 17 January 2008 from Morbus Crohn) was an English broadcaster and DJ on Radio Caroline and a licensed Amateur Radio operator.

== Imagination Radio ==
'IMAGINATION' came about as a therapeutic way of passing the time whilst recovering from that illness. TIME: Each Thursday evening between 8pm and midnight UK time (1900 to 2300 UTC European summer, 2000 to 0000 UTC European winter). FREQUENCY: First via Shortwave, later as part of Radio Caroline via the Astra satellites at 19.2° east and 28.2° east (from UK), first in analogue as a subcarrier of the Travel Shop TV program, later in digital.
