= Leyton (surname) =

Leyton is an English surname. Notable people with the surname include:

- Drue Leyton born Dorothy Blackman, (1903–1997), American actress and member of the French Resistance
- Elliott Leyton (1939–2022), Canadian social-anthropologist, educator and author
- George Leyton (born Henry Hackett; 1864–1948), U.S.-born British entertainer and actor
- John Leyton (born 1936), English actor and singer
- Richard Leyton (born 1987), Chilean footballer
- Sebastián Leyton (born 1993), Chilean footballer
- Brandon Leytón (born 1998), Nicaraguan baseball player

== See also ==
- Layton (surname)
