= William Steeves =

Canadian Father of Confederation (1814–1873)

The Honourable William Steeves MLA
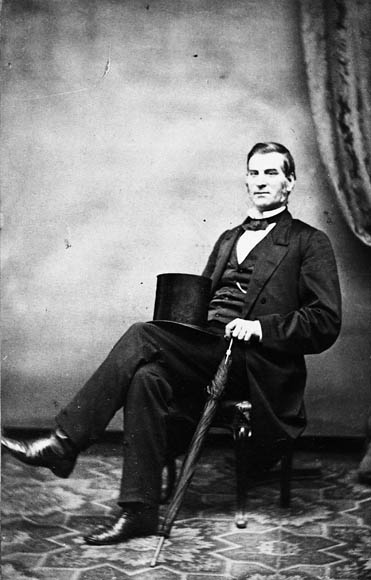

Member of the Legislative Assembly of New Brunswick for Albert
- In office 1847–1854 Serving with John Smith (1847–50) / Robert Stiles (1850–54)
- Preceded by: District created
- Succeeded by: Edward Stevens / Abner Reid McClelan

Senator for New Brunswick
- In office October 23, 1867 – December 9, 1873
- Appointed by: Royal Proclamation

Personal details
- Born: May 20, 1814 Hillsborough, Colony of New Brunswick
- Died: December 9, 1873 (aged 59) Saint John, New Brunswick, Canada
- Party: Liberal

William Henry Steeves (May 20, 1814 – December 9, 1873) was a merchant, lumberman, politician and Father of Canadian Confederation.

== Early life and education ==
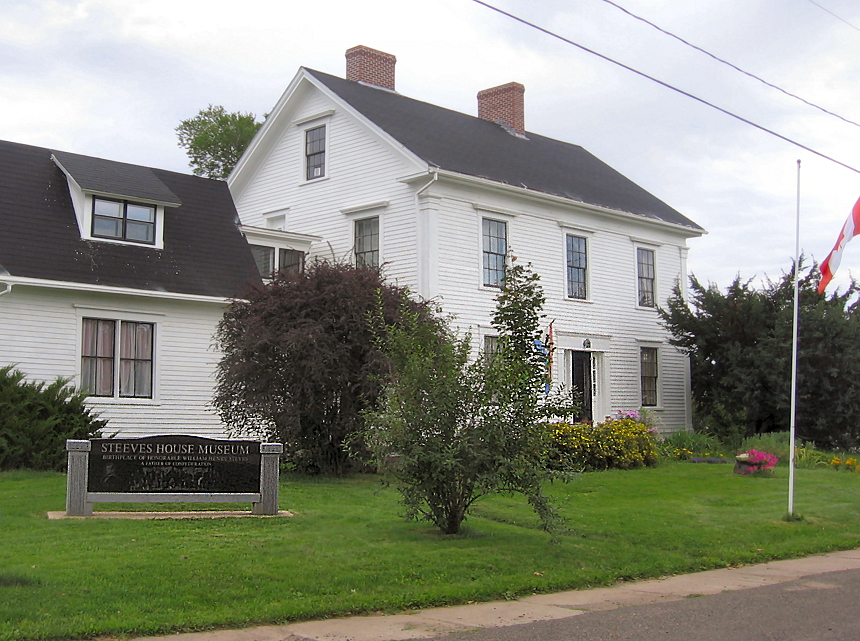
The William Henry Steeves House in Hillsborough, New Brunswick. It is now a museum.

William Henry Steeves was born on May 20, 1814, in Hillsborough, New Brunswick, the eldest son born to parents Joseph Steeves and Martha Gross. His great-grandparents, Heinrich and Regina Stief, were German immigrants who settled in the area after initially migrating to Pennsylvania; they founded the surname "Steeves" in North America. Steeves was educated in public school, where he later recounted receiving "much more education than was usually acquired in New Brunswick by persons attending only public school," which he attributed to being as a result of being taught by Duncan Shaw, a Scottish-born University of Edinburgh alumnus.

== Business career ==
Steeves initially ran a small store before joining his brothers, James and Gilbert, in their Hillsborough-based lumber exporting business partnership known as Steeves Brothers. After moving to Saint John, Steeves furthered the business and established himself as a prominent figure in the city's financial community. Gilbert, his brother, also expanded business operations in Liverpool, England.

== Political career ==
In 1846, Albert County was created; this saw the additional creation of its corresponding electoral district, Albert, and Steeves was elected to the New Brunswick assembly as one of the district's first representatives. During his second term, he attended just one session after his re-election in 1850. Steeves supported government reform as well as requirements for Legislative Council members to be elected rather than appointed; he voted to pass a bill for such legislation in 1851, though it did not pass. In December 1851, he was appointed to the position. Given his location in Saint John, he may have been sought the following year by Sir Edmund Walker Head, the Lieutenant Governor, to serve as Surveyor General, which was ultimately taken by Robert Duncan Wilmot after Steeves chose not to take the position.

In 1854, the compact government that had ruled the colony was finally defeated by a reform administration and Steeves became Surveyor General in the new government. He resigned the appointment later that year due to opposition to an unelected person from the Legislative Council being appointed rather than an elected member of the House of Assembly.

In 1855, Steeves became the first chairman of the Department of Public Works. He left government in 1856 when the reform administration of Samuel Leonard Tilley was defeated over prohibition, but he returned to office with Tilley in 1857 and remained commissioner of public works until 1861. He continued in Tilley's government as minister without portfolio until 1865 when the government fell due to its support for Canadian Confederation.

Steeves was a representative for New Brunswick at the Charlottetown Conference and Quebec Conference in 1864 to discuss the merging of the eastern British colonies of North America into a confederation of Canada. As a result of participating in these conferences, he holds the status of being one of the Fathers of Confederation. Steeves was not recorded making any significant speeches during these conferences, though he did support Samuel Leonard Tilley.

Following the July 1867 creation of the Senate of Canada, Steeves was appointed for New Brunswick as a Liberal. In that body, he acted as an advocate for the better care of the mentally ill. He served in the Senate until his death.

== Personal life and death ==
Steeves married his second cousin, Mary Steeves, in his early 20s; they had seven children, six of whom survived to adulthood.

In his later years, Steeves had worked as a ship broker and managed various ships, and had spent time in Liverpool, England. He died in his home in Saint John on December 9, 1873, and his funeral was held three days later. He was buried at Fernhill Cemetery; his grave bears a plaque, given his designation as a National Historic Person. Steeves is also the maternal great-granduncle of Jack Layton, a prominent left-wing academic and politician who led the New Democratic Party to its most successful point in the party's history.

== See also ==
- Layton family
