= Akmal Shaikh =

British businessman executed for drug offences in China

- Born: 5 April 1956; Pakistan
- Died: 29 December 2009 (aged 53); Ürümqi, Xinjiang, China
- Citizenship: British
- Occupation: Former estate agent/mini-cab businessman
- Children: 5
- Status: Executed by lethal injection
- Conviction: Drug trafficking
- Penalty: Death

Akmal Shaikh (5 April 1956 – 29 December 2009) was a Pakistani-born British businessman who was convicted and executed in China for illegally trafficking approximately 4kg of heroin. The trial and execution attracted significant media attention in the UK.

Shaikh was born in Pakistan and moved to the United Kingdom as a child. After a couple of failed businesses, Shaikh moved to Poland with his second wife in 2005 with the dream of starting an airline, and later of becoming a pop star. He travelled from Poland to China and was arrested by Chinese customs officers at Ürümqi Diwopu International Airport on 12 September 2007 with 4 kilograms (8.818 lb) of heroin hidden in a compartment in his baggage. Shaikh's defence team pleaded ignorance of the existence of the drugs, although his lawyers said that the evidence against Shaikh was "overwhelming". Reprieve, an anti-death penalty organisation, argued that Shaikh had mental illness which was exploited by criminals who tricked him into transporting the heroin on the promise of a recording contract.

Shaikh, who had never been assessed by mental health experts, denied he was mentally ill. He had requested a psychiatric evaluation to prove he was sane, but the requests were refused by Chinese authorities on the grounds that PRC laws required defendants to first provide past medical records showing evidence of a mental disorder before such evaluations could be undertaken. Appeals for clemency were made by his family and by British government officials. After two appeals, the Supreme Court confirmed the death sentence he was given at his first trial in October 2008, and Shaikh was executed by lethal injection in Ürümqi on 29 December 2009. It was reported that Shaikh was the first person with citizenship of a European country to be executed in China since Antonio Riva in 1951. Lau Fat-wai, a Portuguese citizen, also faced drug trafficking charges back in 2006, before Akmal Shaikh, but Mr. Lau's death sentence was only carried out early in 2013.

Britain made 27 official representations to the Chinese government; the Chinese ambassador to London was summoned twice to meet British Foreign Office ministers, once after the execution. Senior British politicians strongly condemned the execution, and were disappointed that clemency was not granted, while human rights groups and some Western legal experts in Chinese law criticised the lack of due process; United Nations Special Rapporteur Philip Alston said the refusal to assess Shaikh's mental health was a violation of international law. The Chinese embassy in Britain said Shaikh had no "previous medical record" of mental illness and that his "rights and interests were properly respected and guaranteed". It said the Chinese stance underlined the "strong resentment" felt by its public to drug traffickers, in part based on "the bitter memory of history" – a reference to the First and Second Opium Wars. Xue Jinzhan, a professor of criminal law at the East China University of Political Science and Law said the administration of the death penalty related to a country's history, culture and other conditions: "It's human nature to plead for a criminal who is from the same country or the same family, but judicial independence should be fully respected and everyone should be equal before the law."

== Biography ==
Shaikh, a Muslim, was a Pakistani migrant to the United Kingdom with his parents during his childhood. His first wife had converted from Hinduism to Islam when they married; they had two sons and a daughter. In the 1980s, Shaikh was an estate agent in the United States. They moved back to London when the business stumbled. He then started a mini-cab business in Kentish Town called 'Teksi' which prospered for a time; even so, he fell into bankruptcy for more than two years during the 1990s.

In 2003, Shaikh sexually harassed and unfairly dismissed a 24-year-old female employee; he also failed to pay more than half her wages. In 2004, an Employment Tribunal awarded her £10,255.97 damages and unpaid wages, which he subsequently never paid. Shaikh and his son, Abdul-Jabbar, both failed to attend the tribunal hearings for the harassment case and sold the business to another minicab firm. Shaikh's first marriage ended in divorce in 2004.

He married his Polish secretary – who was then pregnant with his child – and moved to Poland permanently in 2005, reportedly with ambitions to start an airline. He had been going to Lublin frequently since autumn 2004. Following the 7 July 2005 London bombings, Shaikh sent a text message to two people in London saying: "Now everybody will understand who Muslims are and what jihad is," and was consequently investigated as a terror suspect for five months by British intelligence and Poland's Internal Security Agency. In December 2005, the MI5 investigation was terminated due to insufficient evidence.

Shaikh's ex-wife reported him to Polish police for using threatening behaviour against her and her children; she later withdrew her statement, and the case never went to court. In 2006, he was sentenced by a Polish court to one year in jail (suspended for four years) for driving under the influence of alcohol, and prohibited from driving for three years. He was wanted in 2007 by a Lublin court for not paying alimony.

In 2007, he joined in a month-long demonstration for nurses outside the Warsaw office of the Prime Minister of Poland, and met British musician Gareth Saunders, according to whom Shaikh was destitute, living off handouts and ate at a soup kitchen. Chinese press reports that Saunders was told by Shaikh that he had started a business in Poland, before they met, but which he was forced to abandon due to a conspiracy against him. Shaikh wrote a song, "Come Little Rabbit",^{[a]} which Saunders said Shaikh pestered him and fellow Briton Paul Newberry into recording. Reprieve, an organisation working against the death penalty, campaigned for his release following his arrest in China. A recording of this 'out of tune' song, whose lyrics include a refrain 'Only one world, only one people, only one God', was released by Reprieve to raise awareness for their campaign to save him.

== Drug trafficking, trials and execution ==
Reprieve said Shaikh met a man in Poland named "Carlos" sometime in 2007 who he believed had contacts in the music industry and could help make him famous; Shaikh travelled to Kyrgyzstan, where a man named "Okole" promised Shaikh an opportunity to perform "Come Little Rabbit" at a "huge nightclub" in China he purportedly owned. "Okole" and Shaikh travelled together to China, stopping in Tajikistan, where they stayed in a five-star hotel. On 12 September 2007, Shaikh flew from Dushanbe in Tajikistan, to Ürümqi in north-west China. Shaikh claimed he was told he would have to travel alone to China as the flight was full; "Okole" allegedly gave him a suitcase to carry, and promised he would take the next flight. Shaikh was arrested on his arrival at Ürümqi Airport the same day, when a baggage search revealed he was carrying 4 kilograms (9 lb) of heroin of 84.2% purity. Alerted by Shaikh's nervous and circumspect behaviour, customs officers searched and found the drugs hidden in a compartment of his case, which was "practically empty" but for a few clothes; he only had US$100 and 100 Chinese yuan on his person. Reprieve said that Shaikh claimed the suitcase was not his; and he cooperated with the Chinese authorities in an attempt to catch "Okole", who was supposed to arrive on the next plane, but who never turned up. According to the British media, the British Government was informed of the arrest almost a year later.

First trial – November 2007

Chen Dong, Director of the Ürümqi Legal Aid Center, was appointed to represent Shaikh, who was tried in November 2007. Defence asserted to the court that Shaikh knew nothing of the drugs, and that he did not knowingly smuggle the narcotics. Shaikh was found guilty. On 29 October 2008, after two failed appeals, he was sentenced to death by the Intermediate People's Court of Ürümqi according to the section of the Chinese criminal code which provides the death penalty for smuggling heroin in quantities of more than 50 grams (2 oz). The Supreme People's Court validated the sentence as being in accordance with Articles 48 and 347 of China's Criminal Law. Prospect says the judgement was made public in October 2008.

Second trial – May 2009

His case was heard in the second instance on 26 May 2009. At his second trial, Reprieve said Shaikh defended himself with a "rambling and often incoherent" speech lasting 50 minutes and which was "greeted with incredulity and sometimes mirth by court officials." According to the Sanlian Living Weekly article, one of the two lawyers representing Shaikh during his second trial, Mr. Cao Hong, said that the key defence argument was Shaikh's ignorance of the drug he was transporting. Cao said the official documents, baggage examination reports from the record of his arrest, as well as pictures and video footage taken during the baggage check was "overwhelmingly against Shaikh"; he did not play in court some of the video footage recorded because it was too incriminating. Cao advised Shaikh to undergo a mental evaluation, which he initially refused, arguing that he was not mentally ill. Upon his lawyer's insistence, he made a statement requesting an evaluation to prove that he was mentally sound, but which also said that neither he nor his family had any history of mental illnesses.

The Supreme People's Court ruled that documents provided by the British Embassy in Beijing and Reprieve in support of the request for a psychiatric assessment did not prove that Shaikh had a mental disorder; nor was there a history of mental disease in his family. His lawyer, Cao, confirmed that the documents he received from Reprieve contained "medical information about bipolar disorder, and a list of symptoms and case studies" not specific to Shaikh. According to Professor Jerome A. Cohen, professor emeritus at New York University School of Law, Shaikh's November trial lasted half an hour; he also said that the trial court initially agreed to allow a psychiatric evaluation of Shaikh, but subsequently refused it. Xinhua stated that the court's decision to refuse a mental assessment was based on PRC laws requiring defendants to first provide past medical records showing evidence of a mental disorder before such evaluations could be undertaken. Xinhua also reported the Supreme People's Court's view that medical records provided by the British Embassy contained no documentary evidence to support claims of Shaikh's condition. Although the Chinese authorities state he was provided with interpretation during his trials, The Guardian alleges there was none; and the Foreign Secretary, David Miliband, too intimated that interpretation may have been inadequate.

A final appeal to the Supreme People's Court for an independent assessment of his mental condition failed on 21 December 2009, and his execution date was set for 29 December. Shaikh was not told of his impending execution throughout this time "for humanitarian reasons". Shaikh was visited by two cousins and British consular officials in the hospital where he had been treated for a heart condition since August 2009, and it was only then that he was informed that he would die in 24 hours.

Execution – December 2009

Shaikh was executed by lethal injection at 10:30 CST (02:30 GMT) on 29 December 2009 at the Xishan Detention Centre in Ürümqi. Family members and British consular officials were refused access to Shaikh during the final hours by the Chinese authorities, and were not allowed to witness the execution. According to Reprieve, Shaikh was the first national of an EU member state to be executed in China in over 50 years. Officials say he was given a Muslim burial – his body intact – according to his family's wishes, at the Guslay Muslim Cemetery; his family was not allowed to attend.

== Clemency campaign ==
Campaigners on his behalf alleged a lack of due legal process. They did not dispute that he was carrying a large amount of heroin, but argued for the release of Shaikh based on their assertions that he was mentally ill at the time of the offence saying that the court did not take his condition into account during the trial. The case attracted support from Amnesty International; and UN special rapporteur on extrajudicial executions, Philip Alston, who said there were "strong indications" that Shaikh may have had a mental illness. He also said: "Both Chinese and international law clearly indicate that a person who committed a crime while suffering from significant mental illness should not be subjected to the death penalty," and that "[e]xecuting a mentally ill man would be a major step backwards for China."

His family, which had lost touch with him when he left for Poland, also pleaded for mercy: in a letter to the Chinese Ambassador, his elder brother Akbar wrote that his brother's life had been destroyed by mental illness; Akbar maintained that Shaikh was kind and harmless when healthy, and was much loved by his family. He was concerned at the effect his execution would have on their mother: "She is a frail woman, and our family have not been able to break the news to her that she may lose her youngest child next week." Akmal's children said their father had been "seriously ill for much of his life", and pleaded for a reprieve.

Reprieve and his family all cite examples of Shaikh's "erratic behaviour" and "questionable decisions" at least since 2001. Reprieve interviewed people who had dealings with him to support their claims that he may have had bipolar disorder. Stephen Fry was one celebrity who joined the campaign for clemency. Reprieve also released hundreds of emails that Shaikh had sent in 2007 to embassy staff in Warsaw and to a group of 74 individuals and organisations including Tony Blair. Campaigners argued that Shaikh's delusions of pop stardom were symptomatic of his condition, and may have made him especially susceptible to confidence tricks. Akmal's former solicitor described his client as "charming and charismatic". The lawyer said that "By the time he went over to Poland you could not even sit down and have a conversation with him." Nevertheless, Shaikh had never been assessed by a psychiatrist in Britain or elsewhere.

Dr Peter Schaapveld, clinical and forensic psychologist engaged by Reprieve, was sent to China but was not allowed direct access to Shaikh. However, through 15 minutes' access given to Foreign Office officials to interview Shaikh, Dr Schaapveld said he was able to deduce "with 99 per cent certainty" that Shaikh had a mental disorder, possibly bipolar or schizophrenia. In an op-ed in the South China Morning Post, Professor Jerome A. Cohen suggested that China had failed to comply with its own and international legal standards that required a thorough mental evaluation of Shaikh before rendering a final judgment.

The China Daily said: "Intellectually challenged people do a lot of inexplicable things when they lose control... But seldom have we heard of a mentally ill person hiding as much as 4 kg of heroin in his double-layered suitcase." It added that "the court had no reason not to consider the plaintiff's alleged mental illness if he showed any signs of suffering from it while he was in jail." It further asserted that the claims of his family were contradicted by Shaikh himself, who denied having a history of mental disorder. Wang Mingliang, professor of criminal law in Fudan University, and professor Xue Jinzhan, professor of criminal law at the East China University of Political Science and Law, stated that "the Chinese court's decision to execute Akmal Shaikh was completely appropriate ... [and] the denial of mental evaluation was legitimate and consistent with legal precedent". Xue Jinzhan said the administration of the death penalty related to a country's history, culture and other conditions: "It's human nature to plead for a criminal who is from the same country or the same family, but judicial independence should be fully respected and everyone should be equal before the law"; Wang said it was understandable that British media ran emotional stories and local people reacted with sorrow or anger as Britain did not retain the death penalty. "But one country should respect judicial independence of another country, without any interference in internal affairs."

Britain made 27 official representations to the Chinese government about the case. Gordon Brown reportedly wrote several times to Hu Jintao and pleaded the case personally to Wen Jiabao during the Copenhagen summit. The Chinese ambassador in London was summoned twice by the government over the case. The Chinese Embassy in London cited their country's obligations to the United Nations Conventions against Illicit Drug Trafficking as justification for punishing the "grave crime" of drug smuggling. The embassy statement asserted that Shaikh's rights and interests under Chinese law were "properly respected and guaranteed".

When his cousins, Soohail and Nasir Shaikh, arrived in Ürümqi to spend time with him at the hospital in Ürümqi the day before the execution, they also made a last-minute petition to the local court for a stay of execution; they and British embassy officials delivered a plea for mercy to president Hu Jintao. It was during this visit that Akmal was informed of his impending death.

== Reaction ==
Human rights organisations condemned China's refusal to consider Shaikh's alleged psychological illness as a denial of justice. However, some British commentators were largely sympathetic to, if not supportive of, the hard-line Chinese stance against drug smuggling, and accepted there was little else the British Government could do; some accused British leaders of hypocrisy in light of the country's own drugs problem.

The Chinese authorities reacted angrily to the "foreign interference", citing "the bitter memory" of China under foreign imperialism; and stressing that all legal procedures to safeguard the defendant had been complied with. The Chinese public was cited as being overwhelmingly in support of the execution, further justified by endorsement of its action in the British press.

Reprieve, the group which mounted his campaign, said they had passed on new evidence and testimonials from six people who knew Akmal in Poland that they had received in the final 24 hours which the Chinese government had not acknowledged receiving at the time of the execution. Sally Rowan, their legal director, said that any talk of 'special treatment' was "ridiculous"– as Chinese law has provisions to protect those with mental illness, but they chose not to invoke them. Rowan condemned the execution of an incompetent man as "barbaric". Other mental health charities echoed the sentiments.

Shaikh's family was saddened by the execution, but was split as to whether the UK establishment had done all it could to secure humanitarian treatment. Shaikh's cousins Soohail and Nasir Shaikh praised the efforts of Gordon Brown, British ministers and Reprieve. Two other cousins, Amina and Ridwan Shaikh, attacked the government and the media in a scathing letter to The Guardian that questioned the effectiveness of the government's approach. They criticised the "sporadic media attention" about their cousin's plight for two years, and accused the government of acting out its powerlessness in the face of China's economic might.

=== United Kingdom ===
Following the execution, there was a range of views in the British press, some agreed with the political leaders Gordon Brown, David Miliband and David Cameron, who expressed concerns that a mental health assessment was not done, and that clemency requests had not been granted; others were critical of the UK government's reaction; and some were fairly neutral. Among the journalists who supported the UK government's stance were Dominic Ziegler, author of The Economist's Banyan column on Asian affairs, who felt that the issue raised questions about effective use of protections for defendants during judicial process; and Daniel Korski, who wrote in The Spectator that he felt that China was "a revanchist power" seeking the status and rights of the Western world, though not the responsibilities – Prospect magazine held a similar opinion that the Chinese authorities wished to "stand up to its old oppressors" and show the Chinese people that they [the nation] were "being led in the right direction [by the unelected Communist Party in a time of economic crisis]".

An editorial in The Independent noted that some other Asian countries impose the death penalty for drug-smuggling, and commented that the execution "was less the arrogance of a rising power than evidence that China is still feeling its way in the wider world". George Walden wrote in The Times that he felt if the British government had been more discreet Shaikh might have been reprieved, and that "if we wish to influence China on capital punishment, a little historical humility may be in order". British commentators critical of the UK government's response were Josephine McDermott of The Daily Telegraph who compared the government's "sabre-rattling" approach to the British attitude during the First Opium War in 1839; Michael White of The Guardian, who felt that China would not be interested in "lectures from Europeans on the morality of the drugs trade". Tony Parsons of the Daily Mirror supported China's strong stance against drug peddling, and said the British government's reaction was "shrill beyond belief".

=== People's Republic of China ===
==== Official view ====
Foreign Ministry Spokeswoman Jiang Yu said, "Nobody has the right to speak ill of China's judicial sovereignty. We express our strong dissatisfaction and opposition to the British Government's unreasonable criticism of the case. We urge the British to correct their mistake in order to avoid harming China–UK relations." The Chinese Embassy in London said "The legal structures of China and UK may be different, but it should not stand in the way of enhancing our bilateral relations on the basis of mutual respect." Further, the Embassy cited "the bitter memory" of the Opium trade of the 19th century as a reason for the "strong resentment" felt by the Chinese public to drug traffickers and foreign (especially British) interference. A biannual summit session between China and the UK on human rights scheduled for early January was "postponed" by China in what The Daily Telegraph said was "widely thought to be a rebuke to the UK for its public criticism of China over the execution of Akmal Shaikh".

==== Other views ====
An online survey by the China Daily, a newspaper owned and operated by the Chinese Communist Party, showed 77.5% in favour of the execution and 16% opposing. Vocal supporters included overseas Chinese, legal specialists, government officials as well as journalists. A professor at the Shanghai Institute for European Studies accused Labour politicians of trying to capitalise on the issue of China's human rights for political advantage in the upcoming election. An academic at Fudan University said the British criticism lacked legal and moral basis; their reaction was "unreasonable" and showed "considerable cultural arrogance"; another one at Tsinghua University considered the British politicians' reaction an attempt to "create sentiments and manipulate the public". Wang Dawei, a professor at China People's Public Security University, said that Britain and China should respect each other's differences in ideology and moral standards, rather than "using their own moral standards to judge, condemn and demonise China."

In an editorial published by China Daily, Han Dongping, Professor of History and Political Science at Warren Wilson College, hailed the execution, saying that the decision "upheld the dignity of Chinese law." He suggested that to act otherwise as a result of international pressure would be a return to the extraterritorial privileges that had been granted to many foreign nationals in China in the latter half of the 19th and first half of the 20th century pursuant to the "unequal treaties". Han said that a nation bending its laws under outside pressure "invites endless troubles in the future", leading to a lack of respect for the laws of that country, and dismissed the criticism of China's human rights record by Western governments as "an excuse to intervene in China's internal affairs".

Citing polls and comments on websites of British press, Chinese state media also reported how politicians' outcry was "unrepresentative" of the vast majority of Britons' understanding of and support for China's action.

=== International reaction ===
Some public organisations and individual experts media were critical of the judicial process. The United Nations Special Rapporteur, Philip Alston, a human rights spokesman, felt that the brevity of the initial conviction might not have allowed due process, and that not assessing Shaikh's mental health was "in violation not only of Chinese law but also international law." The European Union condemned the execution and regretted that its calls for the sentence to be commuted had not been heeded. Amnesty International felt the execution highlighted the injustice of the death penalty, particularly in China, and called on all countries to press the Chinese government to improve the legal proceedings for defendants, especially those facing the death penalty. Jerome Cohen, an expert in Chinese law, commented in the US-Asia Law Institute that the main legal issue was the refusal of a psychiatric examination, and that China may review its judicial process in this regard both in light of international criticism, and internal pressure as the country "shares the world's abhorrence of punishing mentally irresponsible people" and after the execution of Yang Jia, who was also refused a psychiatric examination, the public sympathy prompted "some Chinese experts to seek necessary law reforms".

Reaction from the international media was broadly critical of the authorities, with Der Spiegel summarising German commentators as being universally critical of Beijing. Newsweek felt that the Chinese authorities had consolidated their position domestically by giving the impression to Chinese citizens that the government will "protect them the best way it knows how from the mentally unstable, whether they are carrying machetes or suitcases full of drugs", and Ireland's Sunday Independent felt that the West was being hypocritical for overlooking other human rights concerns in China while enjoying the Beijing Olympics.

== See also ==
- China–United Kingdom relations
- Illegal drug trade in China
- Schellenberg smuggling incident

High-profile cases of people executed in Asia for drug trafficking

- Van Tuong Nguyen
- Barlow and Chambers
- Michael McAuliffe
- Nagaenthran K. Dharmalingam

== Notes ==
^[a]"Come Little Rabbit" – video of the song which Reprieve says was recorded by Akmal Shaikh (on reprieve.org).
