= Schellenberg smuggling incident =

Drug smuggling incident of a Canadian in China

- Court: Dalian Intermediate People's Court (first and second trial); Liaoning Provincial Higher People's Court (third trial); Supreme People’s Court (SPC decision)
- Decided: November 20, 2018 (first trial); January 14, 2019 (second trial); August 10, 2021 (third trial); 6 February 2026 (SPC decision)

The Schellenberg smuggling incident is a case in China, which Canadian citizen Robert Lloyd Schellenberg was convicted and sentenced to capital punishment on charges of smuggling drugs in China, which Canada "condemned in the strongest possible terms".

According to the prosecutors for the state, Schellenberg attempted to smuggle methamphetamine with a net weight of just over 222 kg (489 lb) from Dalian to Australia in November 2014; after discovering that his translator had informed the police, he reportedly boarded a plane at Dalian Zhoushuizi International Airport with the intention of fleeing to Thailand. Schellenberg was arrested by Chinese police, when the plane had a stopover at Guangzhou Baiyun International Airport. Schellenberg argued that he was framed by drug dealer Xu Qing and that he was an innocent tourist. On November 20, 2018, the Dalian Intermediate People's Court sentenced Schellenberg to 15 years in prison for drug smuggling, confiscation of 150,000 yuan in personal property, as well as deportation. Schellenberg appealed the verdict. The following December 29, the Liaoning Provincial High People's Court retried him. During the trial, the state prosecutor claimed Schellenberg was an accessory criminal. At the retrial, it was claimed he played an "important role". Despite the crime not succeeding, a light punishment was rejected. The High Court of Liaoning Province ruled in court to send the case back to Dalian Intermediate People's Court for retrial. On January 14, 2019, the Dalian Intermediate People's Court opened a retrial to review the case, sentencing Schellenberg to death and confiscation of all property. After the retrial, Schellenberg's defense team stated that it would appeal.

The Schellenberg case has caused controversy in law and diplomacy. Chinese law stipulates that if the defendant appealed and the retrial court returned the case for review, the original trial court shall not increase the criminal's sentence unless there are new criminal facts and additional prosecutions by the People's Procuratorate, which is the so-called "no additional sentence for appeal" rule. According to Article 347 of the Criminal Law of the People's Republic of China, 15 years of imprisonment, life imprisonment, or the death penalty are appropriate sentences for smuggling over 50 g, (with Schellenberg smuggling 222 kg).

Schellenberg's defense lawyer Zhang Dongshuo and others argued that the Dalian Intermediate People's Court's decision violated the rule of "no additional sentence on appeal". Chinese official media and some Chinese jurists believe that the judgment of the Dalian Intermediate People's Court is in line with relevant laws, as they argued that there was additional evidence and hence the rule no longer applies. In addition, some questioned the case's evidence and trial procedures.

Prior to the retrial, on December 1, 2018, at the request of the United States, Canada arrested the vice chairman of Huawei, Meng Wanzhou, causing friction in Canada–China relations. China later arrested two Canadian citizens for jeopardising national security. Some sources believe that China has been pressuring Canada through Schellenberg, as well as that the previous "hostage diplomacy" has been upgraded to "criminal diplomacy."

In February 2026, his death sentence was overturned by the Supreme People’s Court of China.

== Defendant's history ==
Robert Lloyd Schellenberg
- Born: 1982 (age 43–44); Abbotsford, British Columbia, Canada
- Conviction: Drug smuggling
- Penalty: Death (Note: appeal denied pending Supreme People's Court decision) (Note: Death sentence overturned by the Supreme People’s Court in 2026.)

Robert Lloyd Schellenberg (born 1982) is a Canadian citizen and grew up in Abbotsford, British Columbia. Schellenberg had been jailed twice in Canada for drug possession, and had been arrested a total of 11 times for drug offences and driving under influence before being arrested in China. According to 2012 court documents, Schellenberg had previously suffered from a femoral injury at work, and began to use pain medications to relieve pain and became addicted. In 2010, Schellenberg was sentenced to "one year in prison and two years' probation" for trafficking and transporting drugs. In 2012, Schellenberg was sentenced to two years in prison for drug-related offenses including for trafficking purposes. His father stopped supporting him since he was in prison, but some other relatives still supported him. When Schellenberg was released from prison in 2013, his whereabouts were unknown. According to his aunt, Schellenberg "used earnings from working in Alberta’s oil fields to pay for his travels in Asia".

== Case ==
At the time of the retrial, the Dalian Intermediate People's Court determined that "Kem", "Steven", "Mr. Zhou" and others were controlling an international drug trafficking organization. They had two accounts with Ping An Bank of China and China Merchants Bank to provide funds for drug trafficking. In mid-October 2014, Kem hired a translator Xu Qing, who did not know of the drugs, to rent a warehouse in Dalian to purchase tires, and hid 20 tons of plastic pellets (including 222 packets of methamphetamine that Mr. Zhou and Jian Xiangrong took from Guangzhou) in the warehouse. Kem also informed Xu Qing that he would send a foreigner to help handle the goods. On November 11, 2014, Xu Qing received the goods in Dalian. On November 19, Schellenberg arrived in Dalian under the designation of Kem, trying to hide the drug in a tire liner and smuggle it to Australia. Later, at the request of Schellenberg, Xu Qing brought him to buy related tools, including tires, liners, and used containers. After checking the cargo and estimating the workload, Schellenberg postponed the shipping time from November to December. In the afternoon of November 27, Schellenberg contacted Mai Qingxiang by phone and asked him to find another warehouse to store drugs. Mai telephoned a warehouse shop in Dalian to find a warehouse. On November 29, Xu Qing suspected that the case was a drug crime and reported it to the police. Upon finding out that the police were informed, Schellenberg planned to escape to Thailand from the hotel via Dalian Airport in the early morning of December 1, 2014. On the way, he discarded his old phone card and replaced it with a new one. When the plane had a stopover at Guangzhou Baiyun Airport at 1 pm on the same day, the police arrested Schellenberg. After inspection by the police, the net weight of 222 packets of methamphetamine he was carrying was 222.035 kilograms (489.50 lb). In December 2014, Schellenberg was detained. In January 2015, the prosecution approved his arrest and he was taken to the Dalian Detention Center.

According to the Dalian Intermediate People's Court, from mid-November to early December 2014, Mr. Zhou twice sent Jian to hire a car to transport the goods with drugs from Guangzhou to Hangzhou. Jian, "Stephen" and Mai participated in the transportation. On December 5, Mai was arrested by the police. The public security department seized 501 kilograms of methamphetamine. During the period, Kem and others used the two controlled accounts to provide funds for Jian and Mai. By the time of the retrial, Kem, Stephen and Mr. Zhou had not been captured by the Chinese police, and Jian and Mai had been dealt with in another case. Jian was sentenced to life imprisonment for drug trafficking and illegal possession of drugs, and Mai was sentenced to death with two-year reprieve for drug trafficking.

Schellenberg pleaded not guilty and described himself as an innocent tourist framed by Xu. Schellenberg said he hadn't been to a "warehouse with methamphetamine", but only traveled near the warehouse; Xu took him to a tool store and a tire store, but he didn't buy tools and tires. Schellenberg's defense lawyer, Zhang, believed in the first instance that the evidence in this case was insufficient and that the facts were unclear, and the trial did not rule out a number of major reasonable doubts.

== Relevant Chinese laws ==
=== Smuggling ===
Chapter VI, Section VII of the Criminal Law of the People's Republic of China, as amended in 1997, stipulates that smuggling, trafficking, transportation, manufacturing over 50 grams of methamphetamine may carry a sentence of fifteen years in prison, life imprisonment or execution, and confiscation of property.

Article 347 Smuggling, trafficking, transportation, and manufacturing of drugs, regardless of the quantity, shall be investigated for criminal responsibility and punished.

Smuggling, selling, transporting, or manufacturing drugs in any of the following circumstances shall be punished by fifteen years' imprisonment, life imprisonment or death, and confiscation of property:

1. Smuggling, selling, transporting, or manufacturing more than one kilogram of Opium, more than 50 grams of Heroin or Methamphetamine, or large quantities of other drugs;
2. Main members of drug smuggling, trafficking, transportation, and manufacturing groups;
3. Armed concealment of smuggling, trafficking, transportation, or manufacturing of drugs;
4. Serious cases of resisting inspection, detention, or arrest using violence;
5. Participating in organized international drug trafficking activities. (Below)

— Criminal Law of the People's Republic of China

There are many precedents in China for death penalties for drug crimes being applied to foreign nationals. In 2009, the British national Akmal Shaikh was executed for drug trafficking. The then UK Prime Minister Gordon Brown had personally pleaded with Chinese President Hu Jintao not to execute Shaikh. From 2010 to 2016, six Japanese were sentenced to death for drug crimes in China. In 2014, three South Koreans were executed for drug trafficking.

=== "No additional sentence for appeal" rule ===
Article 237 of the "Criminal Procedure Law of the People's Republic of China" and Article 327 of the "Interpretation of the Supreme People's Court on the Application of the Criminal Procedure Law of the People's Republic of China" stipulate that if the defendant appealed and the retrial court returned the case for review, the original trial court shall not increase the criminal's sentence unless there are new criminal facts and additional prosecutions by the People's Procuratorate, which is the so-called "no additional sentence for appeal" rule.

Article 236 If the retrial court disagrees with the judgment of the first instance, after hearing, the cases shall be handled separately according to the following circumstances:

1. Where the facts and applicable laws of the original judgment are correct, and the sentencing is appropriate, the appeal or protest shall be rejected and the original judgment shall be upheld;
2. If the facts are found to be correct in the original judgment, but there are errors in the applicable law or improper sentencing, the sentence shall be changed;
3. If the facts of the original judgment are not clear or the evidence is insufficient, the judgment may be amended after the facts have been found out; or the original judgment may be revoked and returned to the original trial people's court for retrial.

After the first trial court has made a judgment on a case sent back for retrial in accordance with the third paragraph of the preceding paragraph, if the defendant appeals or the people's procuratorate disagrees, the people's court of the second instance shall make a judgment or ruling in accordance with the law and may not return the people to the original court for trial.

— Criminal Procedure Law of the People's Republic of China

Article 327 In the case where the defendant or its legal agent or close relatives have filed an appeal, after the People's Court of Second Instance has returned the case for retrial, except for new criminal facts and the supplementation of the prosecution, the original trial court may not increase the sentence of the defendant.

== First trial ==
On March 15, 2016, the Dalian Intermediate People's Court opened a trial for the Schellenberg drug smuggling case. The Canadian Embassy in China attended the hearing. On November 20, 2018, the Intermediate People's Court of Dalian sentenced Schellenberg to 15 years in prison, confiscation of RMB150,000 of personal property, and deportation. Schellenberg's defense lawyers claimed his innocence. Schellenberg himself appealed against the verdict.

== Second trial ==
On December 26, 2018, the Liaoning Provincial Higher People's Court announced that the appeal was scheduled to open for trial at 2 pm on December 29, 2018, and it did so without delay. There were about 50 auditors, including officials and media. Schellenberg's defense lawyer, Zhang, defended his innocence. Zhang pointed out in court that the first trial did not rule out a number of important doubts, and the facts were unclear and the evidence was insufficient; even if the court convicts Schellenberg, taking into account that he failed to commit smuggling, combined with other factors, he should be sentenced to deportation instead of imprisonment. Zhang also considered the possibility of witness Xu Qing being a special police officer, and asked key witness Xu Qing to appear in court. Schellenberg argued that Xu had taken him to tool stores and tire stores, but he had not bought tires and tools; he had never entered a warehouse with drugs, and Xu Qing had only taken him to sightseeing nearby. Schellenberg said three times in court, "It's ridiculous". Prosecutors said that according to the clues they had, the case was likely to be an organized international drug trafficking activity, in which Schellenberg played an important role. The first trial that sentenced Schellenberg to 15 years in prison should be reviewed by that court. The trial lasted about two and a half hours. The Liaoning Provincial High Court issued a judgment, stating that the facts of the first trial were unclear, and the decision was returned to the initial court.

=== Sino-Canadian relations before the retrial ===
Before the second trial of the Schellenberg case, China-Canada relations deteriorated rapidly due to Canada's arrest of Huawei's vice chairman and CFO Meng Wanzhou. On December 1, at the request of the United States, Canada arrested Meng at Vancouver International Airport. The Chinese ambassador to Canada announced that Canada's arrest of Meng was a blatant violation of human rights, and China expressed anger and demanded that Canada release Meng immediately. According to information at a bail hearing on December 7, the United States had accused Meng of fraud and violations of U.S. sanctions on Iran. On December 11, the judge ruled that Meng was allowed to be released on bail, with a bail of 10 million Canadian dollars. While on bail, she was monitored by two security guards and a driver. She was required to wear an electronic foot ring equipped with GPS equipment. The monitoring fee was paid by Meng, and she was given a curfew from 11pm to 6am every day. On January 15, 2019, the spokesperson of the Chinese Foreign Ministry Hua Chunying stated at a regular press conference that the Meng case is not a regular legal case, and that Canada is not handling the case in accordance with fairness and justice, but is abusing judicial procedures, and Canada must bear the consequences and responsibility.

After Meng's arrest, Chinese police arrested two other Canadian citizens. On December 10, former diplomat Michael Kovrig and businessman Michael Spavor were arrested by the National Security Agency in Dandong, Liaoning. Kovrig and Spavor were charged with jeopardising China's national security. China has denied that the arrest of Kovrig and Spavor was connected with Meng's. However, some media consider the move to be a retaliatory action by China.

== Third trial ==
On January 10, 2019, the Dalian Intermediate People's Court announced that it will open a trial at 8 am on January 14 to hear the case of Schellenberg smuggling drugs. More than 50 people attended the trial on the 14th, including four Canadian embassy staff, the public, and Chinese and foreign journalists. Schellenberg reportedly asked the court to stop Canadian media from hearing the trial, according to Chinese media sources. In court, prosecutors added accusations that Schellenberg had participated in and played a major role in international drug trafficking organizations. Xu Qing, who never appeared in the first and second trials, testified in court for more than an hour. The court adjourned for an hour at noon and resumed its hearing at 1:30 pm. The total length of the trial was about 13 hours. On the same day, the court found Schellenberg guilty and sentenced him to death and confiscation of all personal property for drug trafficking, agreeing with the judgement of the second trial. Zhang said Schellenberg would appeal the sentence. The appeal was denied on August 10, 2021.

== Reactions ==
The Schellenberg case has caused controversy in law and diplomacy. Schellenberg's defense lawyer Zhang Dongshuo and others believed that the prosecutor's supplementary prosecution was still within the scope of the old criminal facts, so the public prosecutor did not supplement new criminal facts, and the court violated the "no additional sentence for appeal" rule. However, some Chinese state media and jurists believed that the judgment of the court did not violate the rule as new criminal facts were provided. Pei Zhaobin, Dean of the School of Law at Dalian Ocean University, wrote that he had attended the trial and sentencing of the case. During the retrial, the public prosecutor added prosecution of Schellenberg for participating in international drug trafficking activities and playing a major role in criminal organizations. During the trial, the prosecution also produced corresponding evidence. In addition, the prosecutor mentioned in the second trial that the evidence being pursued at the time showed that Schellenberg may have participated in international criminal organizations and played a major role. The Liaoning Provincial High Court also adopted the prosecutor's opinion.

In addition, some people questioned the case's evidence and legal procedures. Someone "familiar with the case" disclosed to the BBC that the evidence in this case was dubious. It was said that the initial trial court asked for assistance from higher courts, and eventually the Supreme People's Court instructed it to give a 15-year sentence, which according to the insider violated legal requirements; the insider said that the second trial usually did not require a face-to-face trial but was generally conducted in writing. However, in view of the Meng Wanzhou events, the court suddenly decided to switch to a face-to-face trial. The Ministry of Justice, Beijing Municipal Justice Bureau, and Xicheng District Justice Bureau also placed pressure on lawyers. Zhang and others believed that after the second instance court sent back the retrial, the case of the first instance court's retrial filing, trial, and judgment was very rapid and rare. However, Zhang believes that the retrial procedure is in compliance with the law.

Some have linked the Schellenberg case to the Meng Wanzhou incident. U.S.-based China watcher Bill Bishop described the Sino-Canadian relationship as having escalated to "criminal diplomacy" from "hostage diplomacy" after the case. Donald Clarke, a professor of Chinese law at George Washington Law School, points out that the case is unusual and it is difficult to believe that the case has nothing to do with Meng. Clarke said that Schellenberg had been arrested in December 2014, but the first trial was in March 2016 and the sentencing in November 2018, which took a relatively long time, but the time taken for retrial was very fast (16 days). Also, retrial of criminal cases is very rare. According to statistics from Clarke, only 2% of Chinese criminal cases were retried in 2017; in addition, Chinese courts rarely voluntarily invite foreign media to attend trials. Stephen McDonell, a BBC correspondent in Beijing, pointed out that China's death sentence needs review by the Supreme People's Court, and the Chinese government may use Schellenberg as a bargaining chip and ask Canada to release Meng.

Canadian Prime Minister Justin Trudeau has publicly expressed serious concerns that China's death sentence is arbitrary. On the same day that the Schellenberg case was re-examined, Trudeau announced a slight cabinet shuffle, with David Lametti as Attorney General and former Attorney General Jody Wilson-Raybould as Minister of Veterans Affairs. Radio Canada International said Lametti will be involved in deciding whether to extradite Meng to the United States. Canadian Foreign Minister Chrystia Freeland claims to have asked the Chinese government to spare Schellenberg's life. The Canadian government issued a travel warning saying that going to China may face the risk of arbitrary enforcement of laws in the country, requiring citizens traveling to China to be highly vigilant. In response, China's Foreign Ministry spokeswoman Hua Chunying condemned the Canadian government's move and said they should instead remind their citizens to follow the law while in China. The foreign ministry also issued a travel warning similar to the one Canada had issued, alleging that Canada had recently "arbitrarily" detained a Chinese national—an apparent reference to Meng Wanzhou's detention several weeks prior.
