= Editorial stance of The Economist =

Editorial stance of English news publication

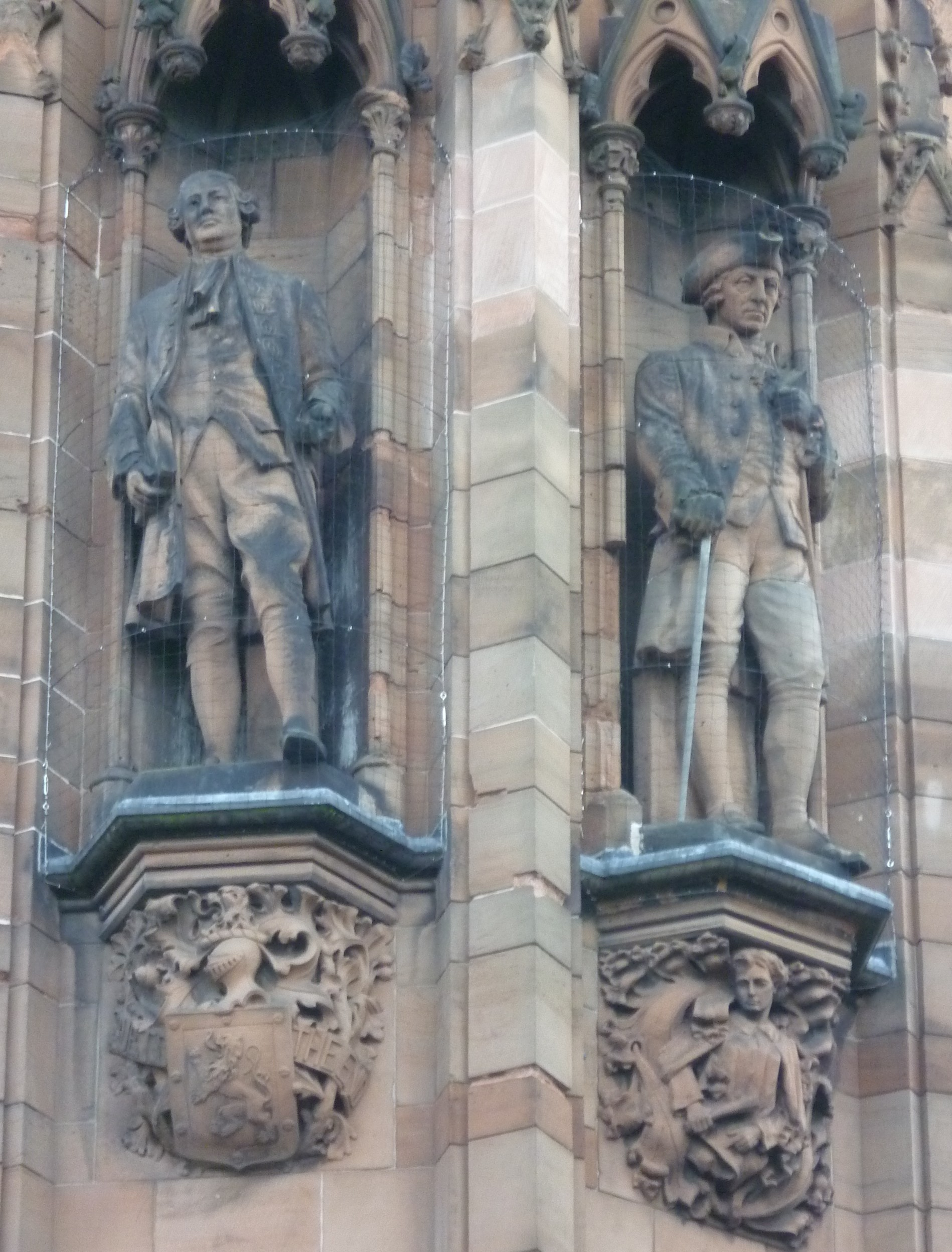
Scottish economist Adam Smith (right) and philosopher David Hume (left) represent the newspaper's foundational beliefs of laissez-faire policies, self-sufficiency, anti-protectionism, and free trade.

Since its founding in 1843, the editorial stance of The Economist has been developed to further its founding purpose to "take part in a severe contest between intelligence, which presses forward, and an unworthy, timid ignorance obstructing our progress". First published by Scottish economist James Wilson to muster support for abolishing the British Corn Laws (1815–1846), a system of import tariffs, the weekly has made free trade a touchstone of their editorial stance.

In 2009, The Economist website featured this note about its editorial stance:

"What, besides free trade and free markets, does The Economist believe in? 'It is to the Radicals that The Economist still likes to think of itself as belonging. The extreme centre is the paper's historical position.' That is as true today as when former Economist editor Geoffrey Crowther said it in 1955. The Economist considers itself the enemy of privilege, pomposity and predictability. It has backed conservatives such as Ronald Reagan and Margaret Thatcher. It has supported the Americans in Vietnam. But it has also endorsed Harold Wilson and Bill Clinton, and espoused a variety of liberal causes: opposing capital punishment from its earliest days, while favoring penal reform and decolonization, as well as—most recently—gun control and gay marriage."

== Early years ==
In its early years under James Wilson the newspaper took a strong laissez-faire stance, opposing the provision of aid to the Irish during the Great Famine, proposing instead that self-sufficiency, anti-protectionism and free trade, not food aid, were the key to ending the famine, as well as opposing government regulation such as the Railway Regulation Act 1844 and the Factories Act 1847.

== 19th-century social reforms ==
In the 19th century the editorial stance of The Economist drifted away from supporting laissez-faire policies. In January 1883, for example, one editorial noted:

... it required very little observation of current politics to see that the principle of laissez-faire is no longer in the ascendant.

— "The New Radicalism", The Economist, 20 January 1883

In September 1883, another editorial noted:

When once it has been conceded that the functions of the State are not to be strictly limited to those simpler duties ... it is wonderful how soon and how rapidly the number of the outlets in which it is thought that State aid may be advantageously applied becomes increased and multiplied.

— "State Aid", The Economist, 29 September 1883

This change in editorial stance reflected a similar change in British politics itself, which had set aside the notion of laissez-faire as a practical philosophy some 50 years beforehand.

== United Kingdom's entry into the Common Market ==
The editorial stance of The Economist on the UK's entry into the Common Market, like the stance of the New Statesman, gradually developed over time. Although it consistently took the position of a cooperative approach to Europe rather than an integrative approach, its initial opposition to European institutions gradually changed to acceptance over time. Once this change occurred, the weekly's supported a decentralized and cooperative model for European institutions, and democratic accountability.

In part, The Economist's own editorial stance was a simple reflection of attitudes within the UK in general, and of its two major political parties through the middle to late 20th century (Conservative and Labour), resisting what it saw as surrender of sovereignty to a supranational institution for as long as possible, and attempting to preserve the UK's self-image of a world power.

Initially, in the years immediately after World War II, contributors to the paper dismissed and rejected proposals for European institutions such as the European Coal and Steel Community, the European Defence Community, the European Economic Community, and European Atomic Energy Community.^{1} Up to the late 1950s, the paper was pro-American.

However, in the period from 1957 to the 1980s, the paper's editorial opinion articles gradually came to accept the idea of the UK as a member in the various European communities. Medrano divides this period, and the transition of the newspaper's editorial stance, into three periods, which he labels "Denial", "Grudging Acceptance", and "Embrace". The New Statesman went through all three of these phases as well, although unlike The Economist, the New Statesman had not completed the third phase at the point of the UK's entry into the Common Market in the 1970s. The Economist had, and was supportive of UK membership during the initial negotiations for entry in the 1960s.

However, the newspaper, whilst supportive of entry, did not conceal its continued editorial dislike of European institutions and pro-American stance. It optimistically predicted that the UK's entry would be able to rectify what it saw as a drift away from the United States by Europe. This is exemplified by a July 1962 editorial:

Doubtless some people in Paris, and some elsewhere on the Continent, at present see Britain as an American Trojan horse. In a sense it is, and quite rightly ...

— "Europe or Atlantis?", The Economist, 14 July 1962

The veto of the UK's entry, by Charles de Gaulle, in 1963 provoked an outraged response from The Economist, which in its editorials predicted the unravelling of European institutions. It also recommended an idea that it had supported in earlier years, that of an Atlantic Community, both economic and military.

Soon after the veto, The Economist's stance on the status of the UK as a dominant world power began to change. One milestone in this is an editorial published in May 1963:

The six and a half years of the attempt to come to terms with the European common market, since the free trade area was proposed in 1956, are the Great Divide of modern British history. For the time being, the attempt has failed; and British opinion is still far from wholly won over to the idea that the European communities qualify as a "good thing". But the effort alone has dealt a mortal blow to the Festival of Britain spirit, the happy pursuit of parochial self-esteem that still dulled the country's awareness of facts in the nineteen-fifties. In the great debate on the common market, the British had seen through some of their own shibboleths; this is something.

The grandest victim of the common market's cold douche has been the illusion that Britain was still a world power, an illusion fostered by a heroic war record and by a touching faith in the welfare state—so half-hearted, so incomplete—as a model for others to emulate, much as British parliamentary institutions were taken as models for the nineteenth century.

— "Breaking out from the Past", The Economist, 18 May 1963

In subsequent years, The Economist continued to support the idea of UK membership in the common market, and began to suggest that it was an economic necessity. It published weekly evaluations of the cost of both entry and of the European institutions, argued that membership of the EC was not incompatible with the Commonwealth of Nations, and discussed industrial and technological advantages that could be obtained as a result of membership. One change, however, was that it no longer pursued the idea of radically transforming the Community from within once the UK was a member, but rather suggested that the UK accept the Community as it already was.

Its reaction to de Gaulle's second veto of UK membership, in 1967, thus differed from its reaction in 1964. Rather than responding with anger and outrage as it had done before, its reaction was introspective and resigned. The paper no longer argued defiantly on the basis of the UK as a world power, but rather portrayed the UK as too small to stand alone, and thus encouraged resolve and perseverance with entry negotiations. This is exemplified by an October 1967 article:

The British have farther to go, less on specific issues of policy than in attitudes. For most of this century it has been natural for Englishmen to think of themselves as part of the English-speaking world, of which the United States has become the visible leader. Only now are they beginning in any number to think of themselves as Europeans as well.

— "And Now", The Economist, 14 October 1967

The newspaper took to minimalizing the economic importance of the Commonwealth in its editorials, calling into question the interpretation of statistical data by those who had an emotional investment in the self-image of the UK as one-time head of an Empire:

Why is this sort of clamor set up whenever any new hope of entering the EEC dawns? The truth is that there are some people in Britain who are bitterly opposed to union with Europe on emotional grounds, or on the grounds of what they call the "bureaucratic monster" at Brussels and in that it interferes with Britons' independence to run their own affairs. Such people are to be found in the economics profession, politics, and the civil service; and this quite clearly does affect their sense of statistical balance.

— "Oh Moo", The Economist, 12 July 1969

It pointed to the Civil Service as one of the ways in which parliamentary sovereignty, something that the opponents of entry argued would be eroded by membership, had already been eroded. Whilst it no longer advocated radical transformation from within, it observed that the UK would have a significant voice within the Eureopean Community, by virtue of its size. Medrano equates the paper's change in editorial stance, immediately before and after the UK's final success in gaining membership, to a "religious conversion". It made economic arguments for membership, on the grounds of growing globalization of markets, political arguments based upon the idea of holding the government of West Germany (which was, at the time, the SPD with its then policy of Ostpolitik) in check, and emotional arguments that played on the British antipathy towards the French by presenting its own federalist view of European communities as an anti-French alternative to the French government's proposals of intergovernmental union.

== Anglo-American relations ==
Whilst, as observed, The Economist's editorial stance was pro-American when it came to postwar international alliances, it was not always so. One particular editorial, that was at the head of a nadir in Anglo-American relations in World War II, was "Noble Negatives". It was published in the 1944-12-30 edition of the newspaper,^{2} and is believed to be the work of Owen Fleming. The so-called "noble negatives" were two cornerstones of U.S. foreign policy: non-intervention with the object of non-involvement.

"Noble Negatives" appeared at the height of mutual criticisms between the UK and the U.S., and provoked wide discussion and comment in the news media of both. It was ostensibly a reply to the "outburst of criticism and abuse" that the U.S. had directed against the UK in previous weeks (that had been, in part, triggered by the Carlo Sforza affair). Its outspoken views on both U.S. foreign policy and sectors of U.S. public opinion were widely quoted, and in the view of Thomson, Meyer, and Briggs, writing in 1945, did much to "clear the air" between the two allies.

The editorial questioned whether the price that the UK had paid for collaboration with the U.S. during the war was not "too high for what we are likely to get". It characterized U.S. public opinion of the UK as "Britain is stealing a march on the poor repressed American exporter, Britain has no intention of fighting the Japanese, [and] Britain is not really fighting in Europe. Britain is imperialist, reactionary, selfish, exclusive, restrictive."

It reflected on this attitude by noting that "All is painfully familiar, the only novelty in the recent epidemic is the evidence that [the] American government itself—or at least part of it—is more anxious to provide ammunition for the miscontents than to correct their wild misstatements." The editorial called for a change in U.K. policy towards the U.S., saying, "Let an end be put to the policy of appeasement which, at Mr. Churchill's personal bidding, has been followed with all the humiliations and abasements", and concluded by saying that:

Hypocrisy is a common Anglo-Saxon failing—indeed, a failing of the rich and comfortable, all over the world ... the British have many times have made themselves cordially disliked by it. But that does not exempt them from feeling resentment when they are the objects of other people's hypocrisy.

— "Noble Negatives", The Economist, 30 December 1944

The result was a media sensation on both sides of the Atlantic. The Daily Telegraph had a headline article "British Frankness Has Good Effect in U.S." The Daily Herald headlined with "So the British Have Dared to Hit Back". Other headline articles were "Anglo-American Back Chat" (in the New York Herald Tribune) "Cross Talk" (in the Daily Mail), and "U.S. Comment on British Touchiness" (in the Manchester Guardian).

The Foreign Office agreed with the editorial, although secret reports from British security services in New York warned that in fact there was worse to come, with support for isolationism and nationalism growing in the U.S., a crumbling of pro-British factions, and an increase in anti-British views in official U.S. government circles. Both President Roosevelt and the Secretary of State Stettinius were besieged by U.S. press calling for an official reaction to the editorial.

Stettinius himself wrote that, "Unfortunately, other British papers had followed the Economist's lead. Even the London Times [had] demanded that America 'put its cards on the table'." His view on the editorial, which he expressed in a memorandum to Roosevelt, was that "the British were undergoing a strain in adjusting to a secondary role after having always accepted a leading one".

== Cold fusion ==
In 1989, The Economist editorialized that the cold fusion "affair" was "exactly what science should be about." Science journalist Michael Brooks wrote:

It seems almost laughably naive in light of what followed, but the Economist was right: the research is what science is about, and has led us somewhere.

— Michael Brooks

== Bosnian War ==
The Economist summarily dismissed Brendan Simms's book, Unfinest Hour, on the Bosnian War for having no more than "the force of an inkpot thrown from a schooldesk" and for its criticism of government ministers for their "flaws of logic [and] failures of clairvoyance". Simms himself observed in response that The Economist's own attempts at clairvoyance had "backfired spectacularly". He pointed to the weekly's editorials through July 1991 and 1992, which predicted that European Community foreign policy would deal with the situation well and that there would not be all-out war in Bosnia.

Simms characterizes The Economist as being "a longstanding opponent of military intervention" in Bosnia, pointing to its editorials of July 1995, when the 1995 NATO bombing campaign in Bosnia and Herzegovina was underway, and to Bill Emmott's own letter to the publication, which rejected "intervention in this three-cornered civil war, a war which all along has risked escalation into a far wider conflict with even ghastlier consequences", as evidence of this.

Simms observed that the newspaper's editorial stance changed at the end of September 1995, describing it as "finally conced[ing] what it had denied for so long".

== Drug liberalization ==
The Economist has, since 1989, argued for the legalisation of drugs, calling it the "least bad solution" in a 2009 issue. A February 2016 article praised the undergoing process of legalisation of cannabis in several countries worldwide.

== Global warming ==
The Economist supports government action on global warming. In 1987 the paper called for a price on carbon emissions. In 1997 it wrote that the United States showed "dangerous signs" of using the developing world as an excuse to do nothing about global warming. In 1998, The Economist expressed its view that global warming may be a catastrophe that warrants much spending to reduce fossil fuels, but before this, climatologists need a stream of reliable data. In a December editorial before the 2009 United Nations Climate Change Conference, The Economist declared its view that the risk of catastrophic climate change and its effect on the economy outweighs the economic consequences of insuring against global warming now.

== War in Afghanistan ==
The Economist supported the ISAF/NATO operation in Afghanistan, and called on Barack Obama to fight the war "with conviction". It supported his escalation of the American presence there in late 2009, on the basis of security interests and that a withdrawal "would amount to a terrible betrayal of the Afghan people, some of whose troubles are the result of Western intervention".

== Invasion of Iraq ==
The Economist supported the 2003 invasion of Iraq, even as early as August 2002, when it argued that "the danger Mr. [Saddam] Hussein poses cannot be overstated". It presented to readers a choice for the West between two options: "to give up and give in, or to remove Mr. Hussein before he gets his bomb. Painful as it is, our vote is for war."

The paper maintained its original support for invasion throughout 2003, but expressed unhappiness as to how it was unfolding, in particular the failure to find any stockpiles or other evidence of weapons of mass destruction. It chastised the Bush administration in July 2003 for its "incomprehensible" defence of its post-war planning. In 2007 the paper disavowed its original judgment in support of the invasion, describing the war a "debacle" that "has inflicted fear, misery and death on its intended beneficiaries".

The episode is remembered by the newspaper's readers, critics and journalists alike. In 2017 The Economist wrote: "A newspaper cannot publish for 174 years without some mistakes. This one has made its share. We thought Britain was safe in the European exchange-rate mechanism just weeks before it crashed out; we opined, in 1997, that Indonesia was well placed to avoid financial crisis; we noted in 1999 that oil, at $10 per barrel, might well reach $5, almost perfectly timing the bottom of the market; and in 2003 we supported the invasion of Iraq."

== China ==
The Economist has been noted to generally take a bearish stance on the Chinese economy and political system.

== Endorsements ==
Like many newspapers, The Economist uses its pages to endorse candidates and parties ahead of major elections.

=== British general elections ===
The Economist has endorsed a party at every United Kingdom general election since 1955, having remained neutral before that, on the grounds that "A journal that is jealous of its reputation for independence would, in any event, be foolish to compromise it by openly taking sides in a general election."

| Year | Party | Leader | Endorsement | Outcome |
|---|---|---|---|---|
| 1955 | Conservative | Sir Anthony Eden | "[I]n the election of 1955 an elector who tries to reach his conclusion by reason based on observation has no choice. He may not like voting Tory. But there is nothing else he can do." | Elected ✓ |
| 1959 | Conservative | Harold Macmillan | "The Tories deserve a vote, if not of confidence, then of hope." | Elected ✓ |
| 1964 | Labour | Harold Wilson | "It does seem to The Economist that, on the nicest balance, the riskier choice of Labour—and Mr Wilson—will be the better choice for voters to make on Thursday." | Elected ✓ |
| 1966 | Conservative | Edward Heath | "On their record in the past decade, as in the past weel, on the central issues of British policy the choice must be for Mr Heath." | Lost ✗ |
| 1970 | Conservative | Edward Heath | "But the Conservatives provide the better hope on at least three grounds: restoring some incentives to risk-taking, not destroying savings through Mr Crossman's pension scheme, and making some overdue advance towards trade union reform." | Elected ✓ |
| February 1974 | Conservative | Edward Heath | "If they want the resolution that they will win through one day ... then there is no alternative to Mr Heath." | Lost ✗ |
| October; 1974 | Conservative | Edward Heath | "[A]lthough a good Liberal contribution would be essential to the formation, and the success, of any coalition, it is the Conservatives who will provide the strongest and toughest opposition to a majority Labour government next week." While expressing a preference for the Conservatives, they also hoped for the "reinforcement of the sensible centre wherever it can be managed: that includes social democratic Labour men, who may yet have a decisive part to play, as much as it includes Conservatives who would rely on unemployment as their main policy" | Lost ✗ |
| 1979 | Conservative | Margaret Thatcher | "We are not confident that it will be proved, but we would like to see it tried. The Economist votes for Mrs Thatcher being given her chance." This year they recognized the risk of Margaret Thatcher, and supported the Liberal Party, led by David Steel, as "the choice for the timid." | Elected ✓ |
| 1983 | Conservative | Margaret Thatcher | "We believe Mrs Thatcher and her colleagues should be given a second chance to deliver them, with the fewest possible Labour (as distinct from alliance) MPs elected against her." | Elected ✓ |
| 1987 | Conservative | Margaret Thatcher | "The Tories may not succeed; the Thatcher revolution may stall, unfinished. But to end its chances now would be folly, grand scale." | Elected ✓ |
| 1992 | Conservative | John Major | "Mr Ashdown's best long-term hope for a Liberal revival lies in overturning the past 92 years, so that the Labour Party and the Liberals rejoin each other. For that to happen, Labour must lose this election, and the bigger its loss the better. And that, given the depressing state of British politics, is the best reason for wanting the Conservatives to win next week." | Elected ✓ |
| 1997 | Conservative | John Major | "Labour doesn't deserve it" | Lost ✗ |
| 2001 | Labour | Tony Blair | "Vote conservative—But choose the ambiguous right-winger rather than the feeble one" | Elected ✓ |
| 2005 | Labour | Tony Blair | "There is no alternative (alas)" | Elected ✓ |
| 2010 | Conservative | David Cameron | "But in this British election the overwhelming necessity of reforming the public sector stands out. It is not just that the budget deficit is a terrifying 11.6% of GDP, a figure that makes tax rises and spending cuts inevitable. Government now accounts for over half the economy, rising to 70% in Northern Ireland. For Britain to thrive, this liberty-destroying Leviathan has to be tackled. The Conservatives, for all their shortcomings, are keenest to do that; and that is the main reason why we would cast our vote for them." | Elected ✓ |
| 2015 | Conservative | David Cameron | "On that calculus, the best hope for Britain is with a continuation of a Conservative-led coalition." | Elected ✓ |
| 2017 | Liberal Democrat | Tim Farron | "No party passes with flying colours. But the closest is the Liberal Democrats." This support was despite the fact that "We know that this year the Lib Dems are going nowhere." | Lost ✗ |
| 2019 | Liberal Democrat | Jo Swinson | "As last time, they are the only choice for anyone who rejects both the hard Brexit of the Conservatives and the hard-left plans of Labour." | Lost ✗ |
| 2024 | Labour | Keir Starmer | "If we had a vote on July 4th, we, too, would pick Labour, because it has the greatest chance of tackling the biggest problem that Britain faces: a chronic and debilitating lack of economic growth." | Elected ✓ |

=== United States presidential elections ===
| Year | Candidate | Party | Endorsement | Outcome |
|---|---|---|---|---|
| 1980 | Ronald Reagan | Republican | "That, perhaps, is the most pressing reason why so many of America's friends want, unusually in a presidential election, to see a change at the top, even one laden with risk. We agree with them." | Elected ✓ |
| 1984 | No endorsement | | | |
| 1988 | No endorsement, "Oh dear!" | | | |
| 1992 | Bill Clinton | Democratic | "Despite the risks, the possibilities are worth pursuing. Our choice falls on him." | Elected ✓ |
| 1996 | Bob Dole | Republican | "We choose him on the assumption that the real Bob Dole is the one who spent three decades on Capitol Hill, not this year's dubious character; that he would be more prudent than his economic plan implies. That is an awkward basis for an endorsement. But the choice is a lousy one." | Lost ✗ |
| 2000 | George W. Bush | Republican | "The Economist, if it had a vote, would choose George W. Bush. It prefers his small government, pro-market philosophy. And, on the simple test of the two crises, he wins on points: behind on a foreign crisis, but well ahead in a domestic one." | Elected ✓ |
| 2004 | John Kerry | Democratic | "The incompetent George W. Bush or the incoherent John Kerry" | Lost ✗ |
| 2008 | Barack Obama | Democratic | "He has campaigned with more style, intelligence and discipline than his opponent. Whether he can fulfil his immense potential remains to be seen. But Mr Obama deserves the presidency." | Elected ✓ |
| 2012 | Barack Obama | Democratic | "Mr Obama has dragged America's economy back from the brink of disaster, and has made a decent fist of foreign policy. So this newspaper would stick with the devil it knows, and re-elect him." | Elected ✓ |
| 2016 | Hillary Clinton | Democratic | "Hence our vote goes to both Mrs Clinton and her party. Partly because she is not Mr Trump, but also in the hope she can show that ordinary politics works for ordinary people—the sort of renewal that American democracy requires." | Lost ✗ |
| 2020 | Joe Biden | Democratic | "Joe Biden is not a miracle cure for what ails America. But he is a good man who would restore steadiness and civility to the White House. He is equipped to begin the long, difficult task of putting a fractured country back together again. That is why, if we had a vote, it would go to Joe." | Elected ✓ |
| 2024 | Kamala Harris | Democratic | "Presidents do not have to be saints and we hope that a second Trump presidency would avoid disaster. But Mr Trump poses an unacceptable risk to America and the world. If The Economist had a vote, we would cast it for Ms Harris." | Lost ✗ |

=== Other national elections ===
| Country | Year | Party | Leader/Candidate | Endorsement | Outcome |
|---|---|---|---|---|---|
| Argentina | 2015 | Republican Proposal | Mauricio Macri | "Argentines should choose Mr Macri." | Elected ✓ |
| Argentina | 2017 | Cambiemos | Mauricio Macri | "On October 22nd Argentina's voters will render a judgment on Mr Macri in a mid-term congressional election. For the sake of Argentina, and of Latin America more broadly, it is important that he do well. A strong showing by his Cambiemos (Let's Change) coalition would help his government continue economic reforms." | Elected ✓ |
| Argentina | 2023 | Liberty Advances | Javier Milei | "The least bad outcome to hope for is that Mr Milei moderates his wild rhetoric and tries to assemble a coalition of sensible politicians keen on reform." | Elected ✓ |
| Australia | 2004 | Liberal-National coalition | John Howard | Had opposed Howard's bid for a third term in 2001 | Elected ✓ |
| Australia | 2013 | Labor | Kevin Rudd | "Mr Rudd gets our vote, largely because of Labor's decent record." | Lost ✗ |
| Brazil | 1998 | PSDB | Fernando Henrique Cardoso | "He has not managed everything perfectly in his first four years, and can be justly criticised for having, in one vital area, fallen far short of that impossible ideal. And he still has plenty to do (see article). But remember what he inherited, and look at what he has made of it, and the balance is heavily in his favour." | Elected ✓ |
| Brazil | 2002 | PSDB | José Serra | Described him as the most market-friendly candidate. | Lost ✗ |
| Brazil | 2010 | PSDB | José Serra | "In a suddenly exciting contest, José Serra would be a better president than Dilma Rousseff." | Lost ✗ |
| Brazil | 2014 | PSDB | Aécio Neves | "Voters should ditch Dilma Rousseff and elect Aécio Neves." | Lost ✗ |
| Brazil | 2018 | PT | Fernando Haddad | "Fernando Haddad is more temperate than his fire-breathing rival." | Lost ✗ |
| Brazil | 2022 | PT | Lula da Silva | "In short, he is far from the ideal candidate, but he is squarely within the realm of the normal—and he is a supporter of democracy. Mr Bolsonaro, by instinct, is not. ... The best outcome would be for Mr Bolsonaro to lose by such a wide margin that he cannot plausibly claim to have won." | Elected ✓ |
| Brazil | 2026 | Mission | Renan Santos | "The candidate whose ideas match the moment most closely is Renan Santos, a hard-charging libertarian. He wants to enact deep structural reform and spending cuts to transform Brazil into a great power." | |
| Canada | 2006 | Conservative | Stephen Harper | "Those daring Canadians: And why they should vote Conservative this time" | Elected ✓ |
| Canada | 2008 | Conservative | Stephen Harper | "Why Stephen Harper does not deserve to be dumped" | Elected ✓ |
| Canada | 2011 | Conservative | Stephen Harper | "For these reasons The Economist, like many Canadians, would be relieved if there were a better alternative to Mr Harper. But there is not." | Elected ✓ |
| Canada | 2025 | Liberal | Mark Carney | "Pierre Poilievre of the Conservative Party is feisty and impressive, but you probably won’t be surprised to learn that The Economist believes Mark Carney, a former central banker and the leader of the Liberal Party, would make a better prime minister." | Elected ✓ |
| Colombia | 2018 | Civic Compromise | Sergio Fajardo | "He would seek to improve the implementation of the peace agreement, not undermine it. He gets our vote." | Lost ✗ |
| Chile | 2021 | Christian Democratic | Yasna Provoste | "There are two moderate candidates, Yasna Provoste of the centre-left and Sebastián Sichel of the centre-right. Either, and especially Ms Provoste, would offer hope that Chile can draw back from its dangerous polarisation and find a new consensus." | Lost ✗ |
| Egypt | 2012 | Freedom and Justice | Mohamed Morsi | "A Muslim Brother is better than a Mubarak crony" | Elected ✓ |
| France | 2007 | UMP | Nicolas Sarkozy | "After a quarter-century of drift Nicolas Sarkozy offers the best hope of reform" | Elected ✓ |
| France | 2012 | UMP | Nicolas Sarkozy | "For all that, if we had a vote on May 6th, we would give it to Mr Sarkozy—but not on his merits, so much as to keep out Mr Hollande." | Lost ✗ |
| France | 2017 | En Marche! | Emmanuel Macron | "Either of the two pro-market candidates would be a blessing. ... Emmanuel Macron is untested and lacks the support of an established party; François Fillon is a social conservative tarnished by scandal. On balance, we would support Mr Macron." | Elected ✓ |
| France | 2017 | En Marche! | Édouard Philippe | "Mr Macron must also break the habit of 30 years in which France's reforms have been blocked by the hard left. Success rests on early, visible progress in two areas—employment and relations with Germany. ... LRM's landslide makes this programme more likely to succeed." | Elected ✓ |
| France | 2022 | En Marche! | Emmanuel Macron | "Mr Macron still has our vote. But he needs company" | Elected ✓ |
| Germany | 2002 | CDU/CSU | Edmund Stoiber | "Time for a change" | Lost ✗ |
| Germany | 2005 | CDU/CSU | Angela Merkel | "For Germany's sake, and for the sake of reform right across the EU, voters should do their best to give Ms Merkel's Christian Democrats and their allies a clear majority on September 18th." | Elected ✓ |
| Germany | 2009 | FDP | Guido Westerwelle | "If this newspaper had a vote in Germany's election, it would cast it for the FDP, in the hope that it joins a coalition with Ms Merkel's CDU." | Elected ✓ |
| Germany | 2013 | CDU/CSU | Angela Merkel | "And yet we believe Mrs Merkel is the right person to lead her country and thus Europe. That is partly because of what she is: the world's most politically gifted democrat and a far safer bet than her leftist opponents." The editorial also favoured a continuation of the existing CDU/CSU–FDP coalition. | Elected ✓ |
| Germany | 2017 | CDU/CSU | Angela Merkel | "A continuation of the present grand coalition with the SPD threatens yet more sleepy stasis. Instead she should team up with the free-market Free Democratic Party and the Greens—who are wise on Europe and tougher on Russia. Such a coalition would stand a chance of shaking the country up. As its leader, the hesitant Mrs Merkel might even become the chancellor who surprised everybody." | Elected ✓ |
| Germany | 2021 | SPD | Olaf Scholz | "the CDU/CSU, frankly, has blown it. Sixteen years in power has been enough. The party has run out of ideas and drive ... Mr Scholz has been an effective finance minister. The German people trust him. He is better placed than a CDU chancellor would be to work with the Greens on climate change." | Elected ✓ |
| India | 2009 | Indian National Congress | Manmohan Singh | "It has presided over an unprecedented economic boom, and has continued the course of cautious liberalisation and globalisation followed by its predecessors. ... For this reason, The Economist, if it had a vote, would plump for Mr Singh's Congress." | Elected ✓ |
| India | 2014 | Indian National Congress | Rahul Gandhi | "We do not find the prospect of a government led by Congress under Mr Gandhi an inspiring one. But we have to recommend it to Indians as the less disturbing option." | Lost ✗ |
| India | 2019 | Indian National Congress | Rahul Gandhi | "Congress, the BJP's only national rival, may be hidebound and corrupt, but at least it does not set Indians at one another's throats. ... It is a worthier recipient of Indians' votes than the BJP." | Lost ✗ |
| Indonesia | 2019 | PDI-P | Joko Widodo | "[Prabowo's] election would be a step backwards for Indonesia's 20-year-old democracy. It is heartening, therefore, that most polls show Jokowi firmly in the lead." | Elected ✓ |
| Israel | 2015 | Zionist Union | Isaac Herzog | "[Herzog] is level-headed and has a credible security and economic team. He wants talks with the Palestinians and to heal ties with Mr Obama." | Lost ✗ |
| Italy | 2006 | The Union | Romano Prodi | "Italians have a rotten choice to make, but it is time to sack Silvio Berlusconi." | Lost ✗ |
| Italy | 2008 | Democratic Party | Walter Veltroni | "Silvio Berlusconi has failed to show that he is any more worthy of leading Italy today than he was in the past." | Lost ✗ |
| Italy | 2013 | Democratic Party | Pier Luigi Bersani | The editorial called for a coalition between the centre-left and Mario Monti's centrist coalition. | Elected ✓ |
| Italy | 2018 | Democratic Party | Paolo Gentiloni | "If The Economist had a vote, we would reject those woeful options and plump instead for continued government by the left-of-centre Democratic Party (PD)." | Lost ✗ |
| Mexico | 2012 | Institutional Revolutionary Party | Enrique Peña Nieto | "Enrique Peña is the least bad choice. But he must still show he is a force for reform." | Elected ✓ |
| Nigeria | 2015 | All Progressives Congress | Muhammadu Buhari | "We are relieved not to have a vote in this election. But were we offered one we would—with a heavy heart—choose Mr Buhari." | Elected ✓ |
| Nigeria | 2023 | Labour | Peter Obi | "He is the only candidate to offer Nigerians much hope of change. In a country that has been badly and repeatedly failed by its leaders, he is easily the best choice." | Lost ✗ |
| Philippines | 2016 | Liberal Party | Mar Roxas | "This newspaper's view is that the dull but diligent Mr Roxas would make the best next president." | Lost ✗ |
| Poland | 2025 | Civic Platform | Rafał Trzaskowski | "Were Mr Nawrocki to win the second round, both Poland and Europe would suffer." | Lost ✗ |
| South Africa | 2014 | Democratic Alliance | Helen Zille | "The DA deserves to be endorsed. It has doggedly promoted non-racial and liberal values and sensible economic policies." | Lost ✗ |
| South Africa | 2019 | African National Congress | Cyril Ramaphosa | "But this time, with deep reservations, we would cast our notional vote, at the national level, for the ANC." | Elected ✓ |
| South Africa | 2024 | Democratic Alliance | John Steenhuisen | "When they vote on May 29th, they should throw out a party that has proved unable to govern. But that seems unlikely. Many voters still associate the ANC with liberation itself. ... The best option for South Africa would be for the ANC to work with the Democratic Alliance (DA), a moderate, liberal party that governs well at a local level." | Elected ✓ |
| Spain | 2015 | Citizens | Albert Rivera | "If The Economist had a vote, it would go to Ciudadanos." The editorial called for a coalition between Ciudadanos and the conservative People's Party. | Lost ✗ |
| Spain | 2019 | PSOE | Pedro Sánchez | "Ideally, Spaniards would vote on April 28th for Mr Sánchez's party in large enough numbers for it not to need allies." | Elected ✓ |
| Turkey | 2007 | AK Party | Recep Tayyip Erdoğan | "The best outcome would be the re-election of Recep Tayyip Erdogan" | Elected ✓ |
| Turkey | 2011 | CHP | Kemal Kılıçdaroğlu | "Turkey's election: One for the opposition" | Lost ✗ |
| Turkey | June 2015 | HDP | Selahattin Demirtaş | "Why Turks should vote Kurd: It is the best way of stopping their country's drift towards autocracy." | Lost ✗ |
| Turkey | 2018 | CHP | Muharrem İnce | "On balance, Muharrem Ince, a former teacher who now represents Kemal Ataturk's old party, the CHP, is the best option." | Lost ✗ |
| Turkey | 2023 | CHP | Kemal Kılıçdaroğlu | "We warmly endorse Kemal Kilicdaroglu as the next president of Turkey." | Lost ✗ |
| United States | 2006 midterm | Democratic | Nancy Pelosi (H); Harry Reid (S) | "Whichever way you look at it, the Republicans deserve to get clobbered next week." | Elected ✓ |
| United States | 2018 midterm | Democratic | Nancy Pelosi (H); Chuck Schumer (S) | "[T]he route forward is by many small steps, beginning with next week's elections. And the first of those steps is for the House, at a minimum, to switch to Democratic control." | Elected ✓ |
| Zambia | 2021 | United Party for National Development | Hakainde Hichilema | "On August 12th Zambians should do as they did in 1991 and 2021 — vote out the incumbent president. The main opposition candidate, Hakainde Hichilema, would be a huge improvement on Mr Lungu." | Elected ✓ |

=== Local elections ===
- 2001 New York City mayoral election: Michael Bloomberg, Republican, "The Economist would shudder and pull the lever for Mr. Bloomberg"
- 2003 California recall: Arnold Schwarzenegger, Republican, though the newspaper was strongly opposed to the recall itself
- 2004 London mayoral election: Ken Livingstone, Labour, "Why Londoners should vote for Ken Livingstone, despite his many flaws"
- 2012 London mayoral election: Boris Johnson, Conservative, "Boris Johnson deserves another term as mayor of London. He also deserves a proper job"

=== Party primaries ===
- 2008 Kadima leadership election: Tzipi Livni, "Ms Livni has the toughness and the vision to [achieve the co-operation of both a new American president and a host of difficult Arabs]. She is thus Israel's best chance of peace"
- Labour leadership election, 2015: Liz Kendall
- 2015 Liberal Democrats leadership election: Norman Lamb, "Of the two candidates, the drier Mr Lamb looks the more likely to raise from the ruins of the Lib Dems' defeat a distinctive force capable of pulling British politics in a liberal direction. He is the sober choice for a punch-drunk party"
- Republican Party presidential primaries, 2016: John Kasich, "If The Economist had cast a vote in the Republican primaries in Iowa, New Hampshire, South Carolina or Nevada we would have supported John Kasich. The governor of Ohio has a good mixture of experience, in Congress and in his home state as well as in the private sector. He has also shown bravery, expanding Medicaid in Ohio though he knew it would count against him later with primary voters, as indeed it has"
- Democratic Party presidential primaries, 2020: Joe Biden, "Many younger Democrats think that the former vice-president's faith in his power to persuade Republicans to cross the aisle and support him is touching at best, and dangerously naive at worst. Yet the only way to bring about long-lasting change in Washington is for a president to find a coalition in Congress that is broad enough to pass laws. After Super Tuesday, it looks as if only one candidate on the Democratic side may be capable of doing that"

=== Referendums ===
- 2014 Scottish independence referendum: opposed to independence.
- 2016 United Kingdom European Union membership referendum: supported remaining in the European Union.
- 2016 Italian constitutional referendum: opposed the proposed new constitutional law.
- 2017 Turkish constitutional referendum: opposed the proposed new constitutional law.
- 2020 Chilean national plebiscite: supported a new constitution.
- 2022 Chilean national plebiscite: opposed the proposed new Constitution, calling it a "fiscally irresponsible left-wing wish list".

Some of these might not be considered official endorsements but express The Economist's view on the matter.

== Footnotes ==
- ^1 In its 20 May 1950 edition, the newspaper remarked that the Schuman Plan would "stand or fall" depending from its effects on the links between Europe and the U.S., and warned that Konrad Adenauer and others were aiming to organize Western Europe on neutralist lines that would not ally it with the U.S. against the Soviet Union.
- ^2 It was re-printed in the 8 January 1945 issue of The Daily Telegraph.
