= The Economist =

British news and current affairs journal

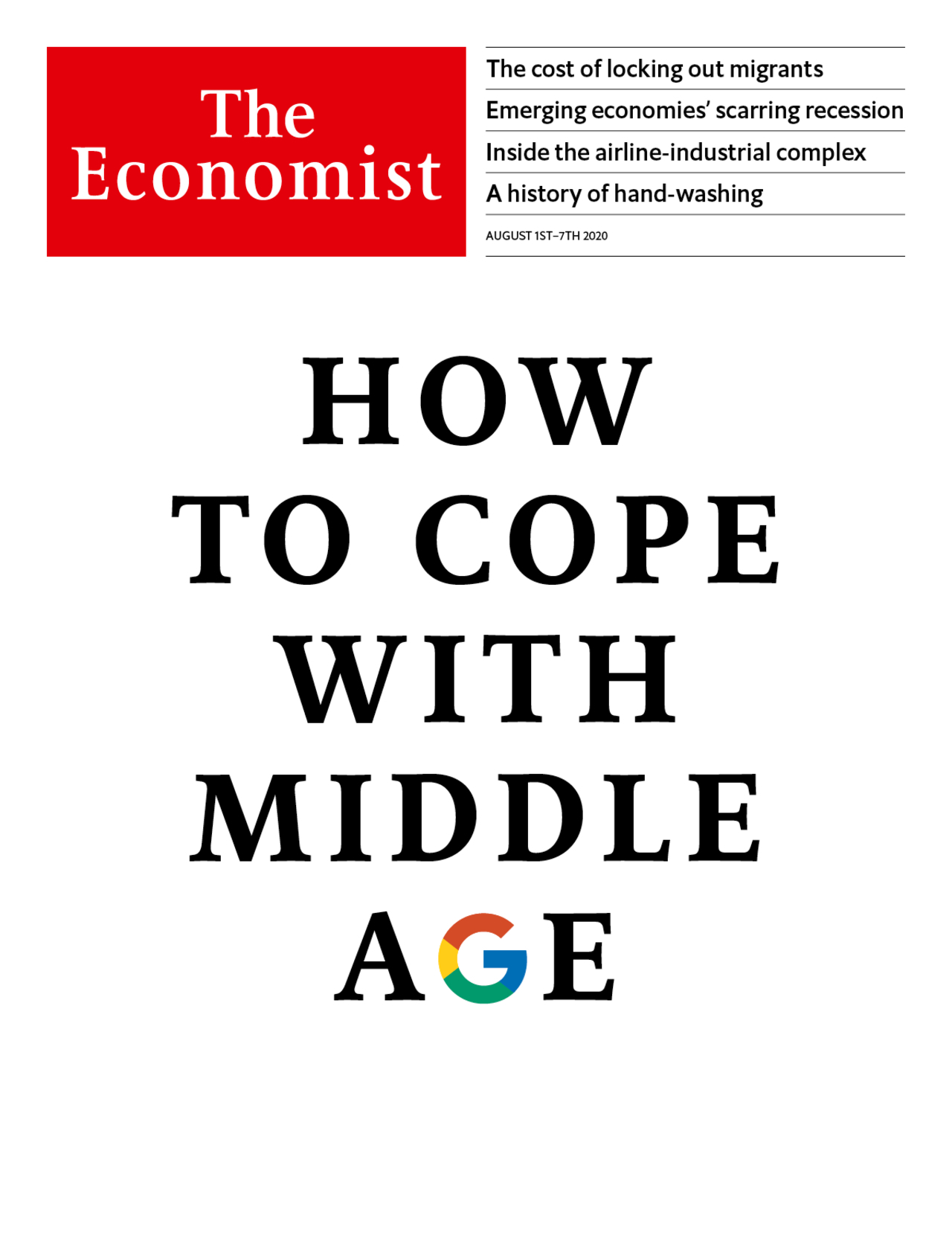
- Cover of the 1 August 2020 issue
- Owner: The Economist Group
- Founder: James Wilson
- Editor: Zanny Minton Beddoes
- Deputy editor: Tom Standage
- Founded: September 1843; 183 years ago
- Political alignment: Radical centrism Economic liberalism Social liberalism
- Headquarters: The Adelphi, 1–11 John Adam St, Westminster, London WC2N 6HT, United Kingdom
- Circulation: 1.225 million (as of September 2025)
- ISSN: 0013-0613 (print); 2978-4360 (web)
- OCLC number: 1081684
- Website: www.economist.com

The Economist is a British news and current affairs journal published in a weekly print magazine format and daily on digital platforms. Widely considered a magazine, it refers to itself as a newspaper, and publishes stories on topics that include economics, business, geopolitics, technology and culture. Mostly written and edited in London, it has other editorial offices in the United States and in major cities in continental Europe, Asia, and the Middle East. The publication prominently features data journalism, and has a focus on interpretive analysis over original reporting, to both criticism and acclaim.

Founded in 1843, The Economist was first circulated by Scottish economist James Wilson to muster support for abolishing the British Corn Laws (1815–1846), a system of import tariffs. Over time, the newspaper's coverage expanded further into political economy and eventually began running articles on current events, finance, commerce, and British politics. Throughout the mid-to-late 20th century, it greatly expanded its layout and format, adding opinion columns, special reports, political cartoons, reader letters, cover stories, art critique, book reviews, and technology features. The paper is recognisable by its fire engine red masthead (nameplate) and illustrated, topical covers. Individual articles are written anonymously, with no byline, in order for the paper to speak as one collective voice. It is supplemented by its sister lifestyle magazine, 1843, and a variety of podcasts, films, and books. It is considered a newspaper of record in the UK.

The editorial stance of The Economist primarily revolves around classical, social, and most notably economic liberalism. It has supported radical centrism, favouring policies and governments that maintain centrist politics. The newspaper typically champions economic liberalism, particularly free markets, free trade, free immigration, deregulation, and globalisation. Its extensive use of word play and high subscription price has linked the paper with a high-income elite readership, drawing both positive and negative connotations. In line with this, it claims to have an influential readership of prominent business leaders and policy-makers.

== History ==
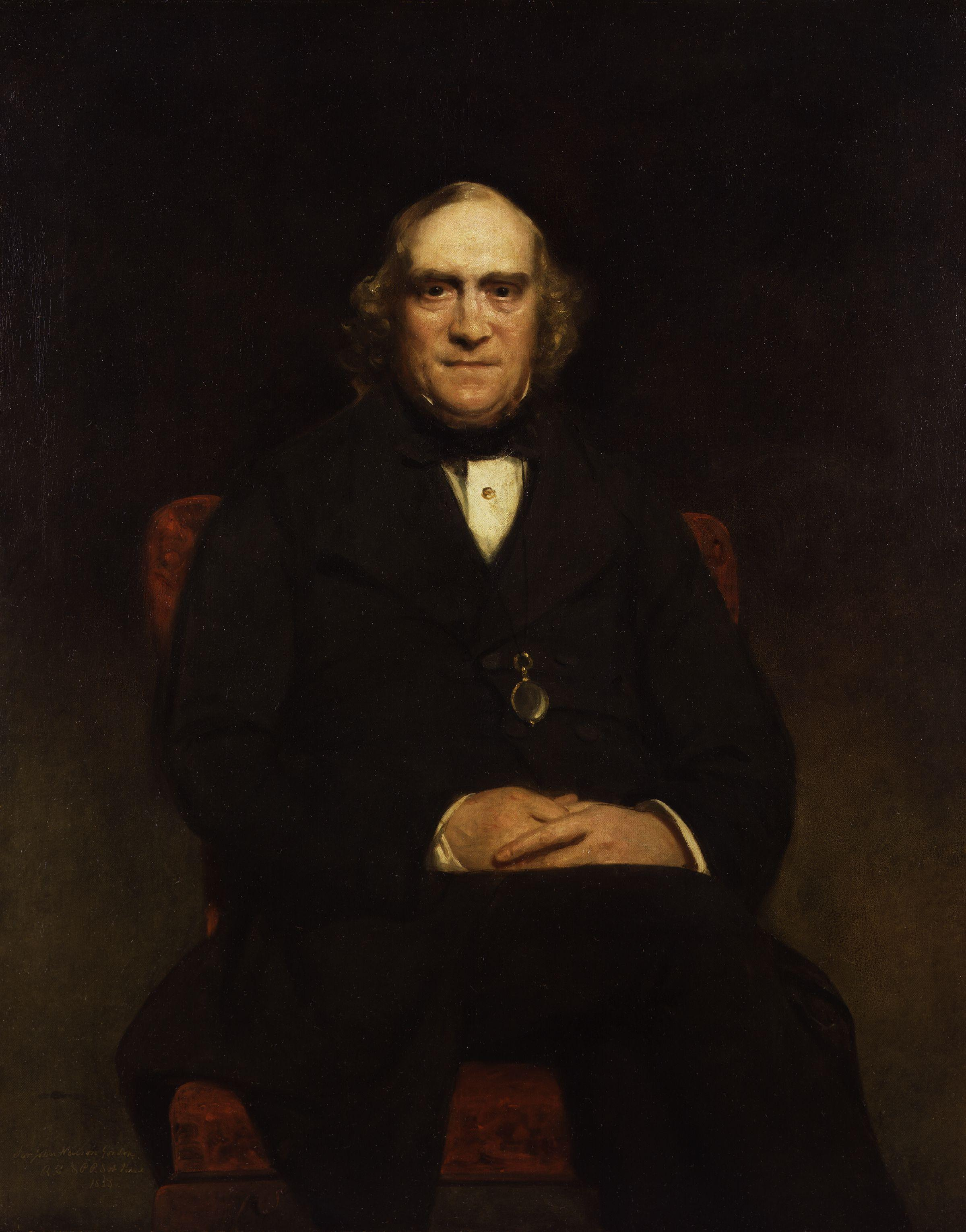
Scottish economist James Wilson founded the newspaper to "take part in a severe contest between intelligence ... and ... ignorance". Its first issue (right) was published on 2 September 1843 as a broadsheet newspaper before transitioning into a perfect-bound weekly paper in 1971; the paper currently uses a stapled magazine format.

The Economist was founded by the British businessman and banker James Wilson in 1843, to advance the repeal of the Corn Laws, a system of import tariffs. A prospectus for the newspaper from 5 August 1843 enumerated thirteen areas of coverage that its editors wanted the publication to focus on:

- Original leading articles, in which free-trade principles will be most rigidly applied to all the important questions of the day.
- Articles relating to some practical, commercial, agricultural, or foreign topic of passing interest, such as foreign treaties.
- An article on the elementary principles of political economy, applied to practical experience, covering the laws related to prices, wages, rent, exchange, revenue and taxes.
- Parliamentary reports, with particular focus on commerce, agriculture and free trade.
- Reports and accounts of popular movements advocating free trade.
- General news from the Court of St James's, the Metropolis, the Provinces, Scotland, and Ireland.
- Commercial topics such as changes in fiscal regulations, the state and prospects of the markets, imports and exports, foreign news, the state of the manufacturing districts, notices of important new mechanical improvements, shipping news, the money market, and the progress of railways and public companies.
- Agricultural topics, including the application of geology and chemistry; notices of new and improved implements, state of crops, markets, prices, foreign markets and prices converted into English money; from time to time, in some detail, the plans pursued in Belgium, Switzerland, and other well-cultivated countries.
- Colonial and foreign topics, including trade, produce, political and fiscal changes, and other matters, including exposés on the evils of restriction and protection, and the advantages of free intercourse and trade.
- Law reports, confined chiefly to areas important to commerce, manufacturing, and agriculture.
- Books, confined chiefly, but not so exclusively, to commerce, manufacturing, and agriculture, and including all treatises on political economy, finance, or taxation.
- A commercial gazette, with prices and statistics of the week.
- Correspondence and inquiries from the newspaper's readers.

Wilson described it as taking part in "a severe contest between intelligence, which presses forward, and an unworthy, timid ignorance obstructing our progress", a phrase which still appears on its imprint (US: masthead) as the publication's mission. It has long been respected as "one of the most competent and subtle Western periodicals on public affairs". It was cited by Karl Marx in his formulation of socialist theory because Marx felt the publication epitomised the interests of the bourgeoisie. He wrote that "the London Economist, the European organ of the aristocracy of finance, described most strikingly the attitude of this class." In 1915, revolutionary Vladimir Lenin referred to The Economist as a "journal that speaks for British millionaires". Additionally, Lenin stated that The Economist held a "bourgeois-pacifist" position and supported peace out of fear of revolution.

In the currency disputes of the mid-nineteenth century, the journal sided with the Banking School against the Currency School. It criticised the Bank Charter Act 1844 which restricted the amount of bank notes that the Bank of England could issue on the basis of Currency School policy encouraged by Lord Overstone, that eventually developed into monetarism. It blamed the 1857 financial crisis in Britain on 'a certain class of doctrinaires' who 'refer every commercial crisis and its disastrous consequences to "excessive issues of bank notes". It identified the causes of the financial crisis as variations in interest rates and a build-up of excess financial capital leading to unwise investments.

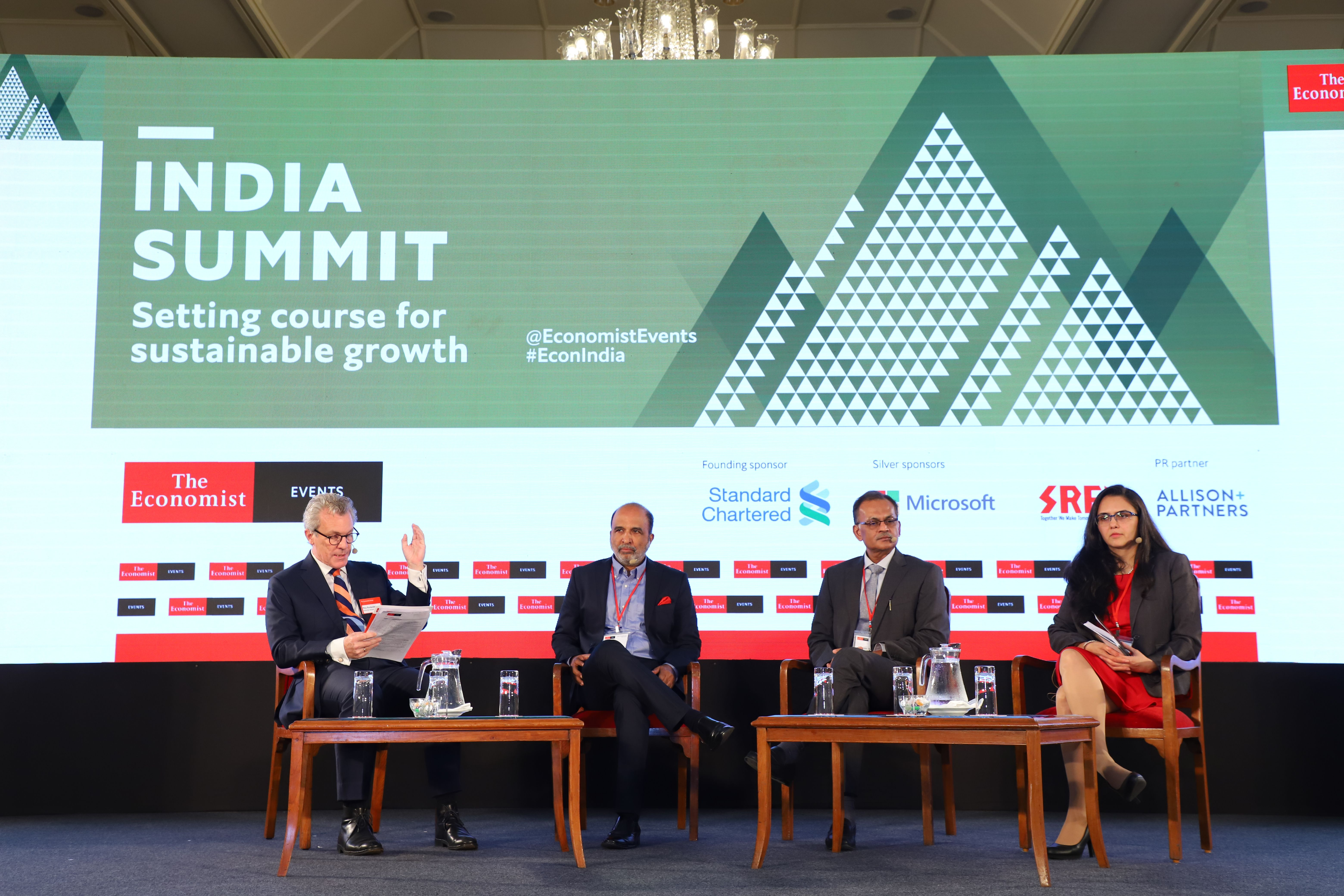
A panel of journalists and public policy leaders at The Economist's 2019 India Summit

In 1920, the paper's circulation rose to 6,170. In 1934, it underwent its first major redesign. The current fire engine red nameplate was created by Reynolds Stone in 1959. In 1971, The Economist changed its large broadsheet format into a smaller magazine-style perfect-bound formatting. In 1981 the publication introduced a North American edition after publishing the British edition since 1843; its circulation had increased more than tenfold by 2010. In January 2012, The Economist launched a new weekly section devoted exclusively to China, the first new country section since the introduction of one on the United States in 1942.

In 1991, James Fallows argued in The Washington Post that The Economist used editorial lines that contradicted the news stories they purported to highlight. In 1999, Andrew Sullivan complained in The New Republic that it uses "marketing genius" to make up for deficiencies in original reporting, resulting in "a kind of Reader's Digest" for America's corporate elite. The Guardian wrote that "its writers rarely see a political or economic problem that cannot be solved by the trusted three-card trick of privatisation, deregulation and liberalisation".

In 2005, the Chicago Tribune named it the best English-language paper noting its strength in international reporting where it does not feel moved to "cover a faraway land only at a time of unmitigated disaster" and that it kept a wall between its reporting and its more conservative editorial policies. In 2008, Jon Meacham, former editor of Newsweek and a self-described "fan", criticised The Economist's focus on analysis over original reporting. In 2012, The Economist was accused of hacking into the computer of Justice Mohammed Nizamul Huq of the Bangladesh Supreme Court, leading to his resignation as the chairman of the International Crimes Tribunal. In August 2015, Pearson sold its 50% stake in the newspaper to the Italian Agnelli family's investment company, Exor, for £469 million (US$531 million) and the paper re-acquired the remaining shares for £182 million ($206 million).

=== Fossil fuel advertising ===
An investigation by The Intercept, The Nation and DeSmog found that The Economist is one of the leading media outlets that publishes advertising for the fossil fuel industry. Journalists who cover climate change for The Economist are concerned that conflicts of interest with the companies and industries that caused climate change and obstructed action will reduce the credibility of their reporting on climate change and cause readers to downplay the climate crisis.

== Organisation ==
The Economist is a member of the Economist Group.

=== Shareholders ===
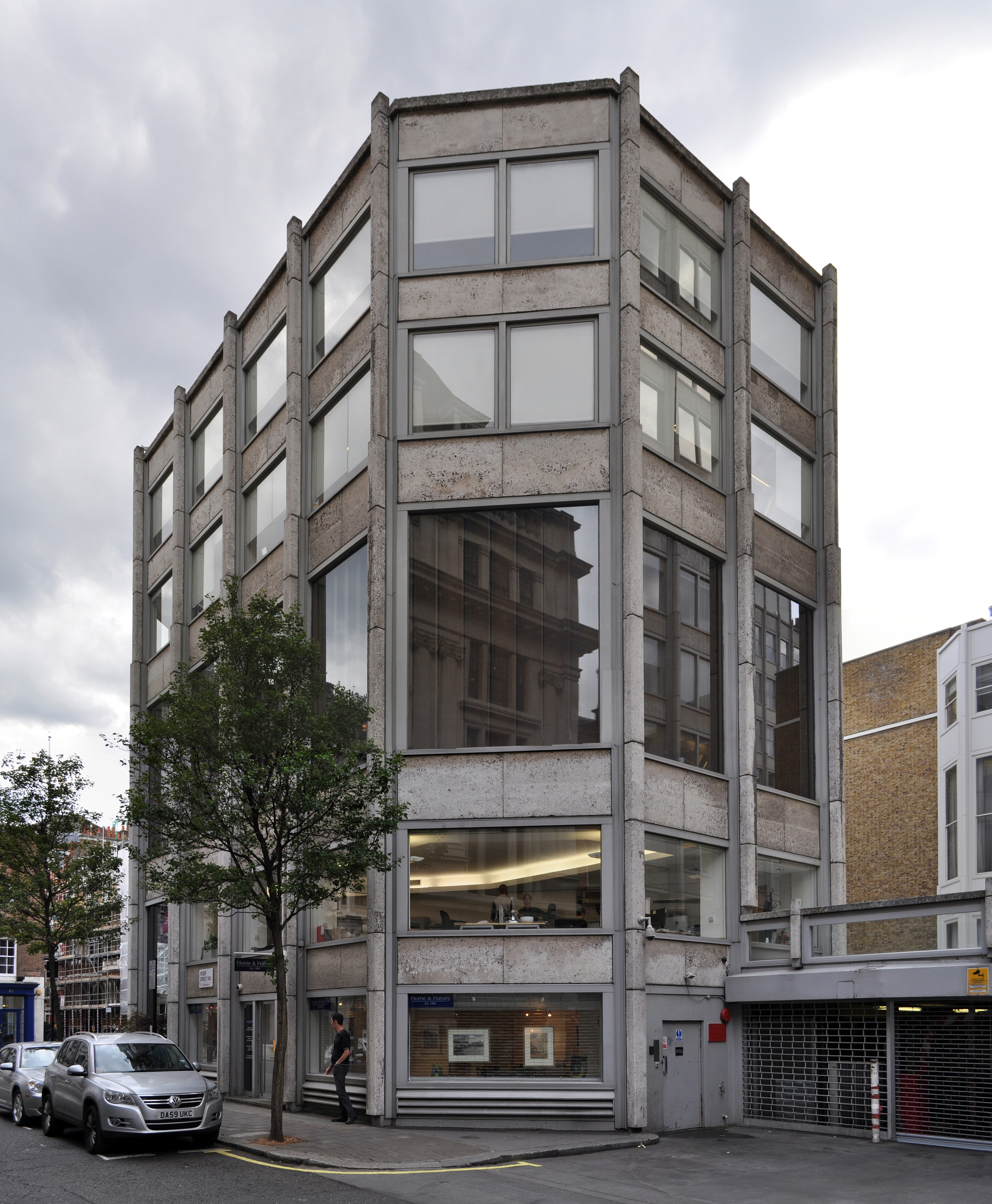
City of Westminster's Smithson Plaza, formerly known as The Economist Building, served as the headquarters of the paper until 2017, on St James's Street.

Pearson plc held a 50% shareholding via The Financial Times Limited until August 2015. At that time, Pearson sold their share in the Economist. The Agnelli family's Exor paid £287m to raise their stake from 4.7% to 43.4% while the Economist paid £182m for the balance of 5.04m shares which will be distributed to current shareholders. Aside from the Agnelli family, smaller shareholders in the company include Cadbury, Rothschild (21%), Schroder, Layton and other family interests as well as a number of staff and former staff shareholders.

A board of trustees formally appoints the editor, who cannot be removed without its permission, to protect the Economist's editorial independence. The current trustees are Virginia Bottomley, Alison Carnwath, Tim Clark and Gus O'Donnell.

The Economist Newspaper Limited is a wholly owned subsidiary of The Economist Group. Sir Evelyn Robert de Rothschild was chairman of the company from 1972 to 1989. In March 2026, Canadian businessman Stephen J.R. Smith bought a 26.9% stake in The Economist Group formerly held by Lynn Forester de Rothschild.

=== Staff ===
Although The Economist has a global emphasis and scope, about two-thirds of the 75 staff journalists are based in the London borough of Westminster. However, due to half of all subscribers originating in the United States, The Economist has core editorial offices and substantial operations in New York City, Los Angeles, Chicago, and Washington D.C.

=== Editor ===
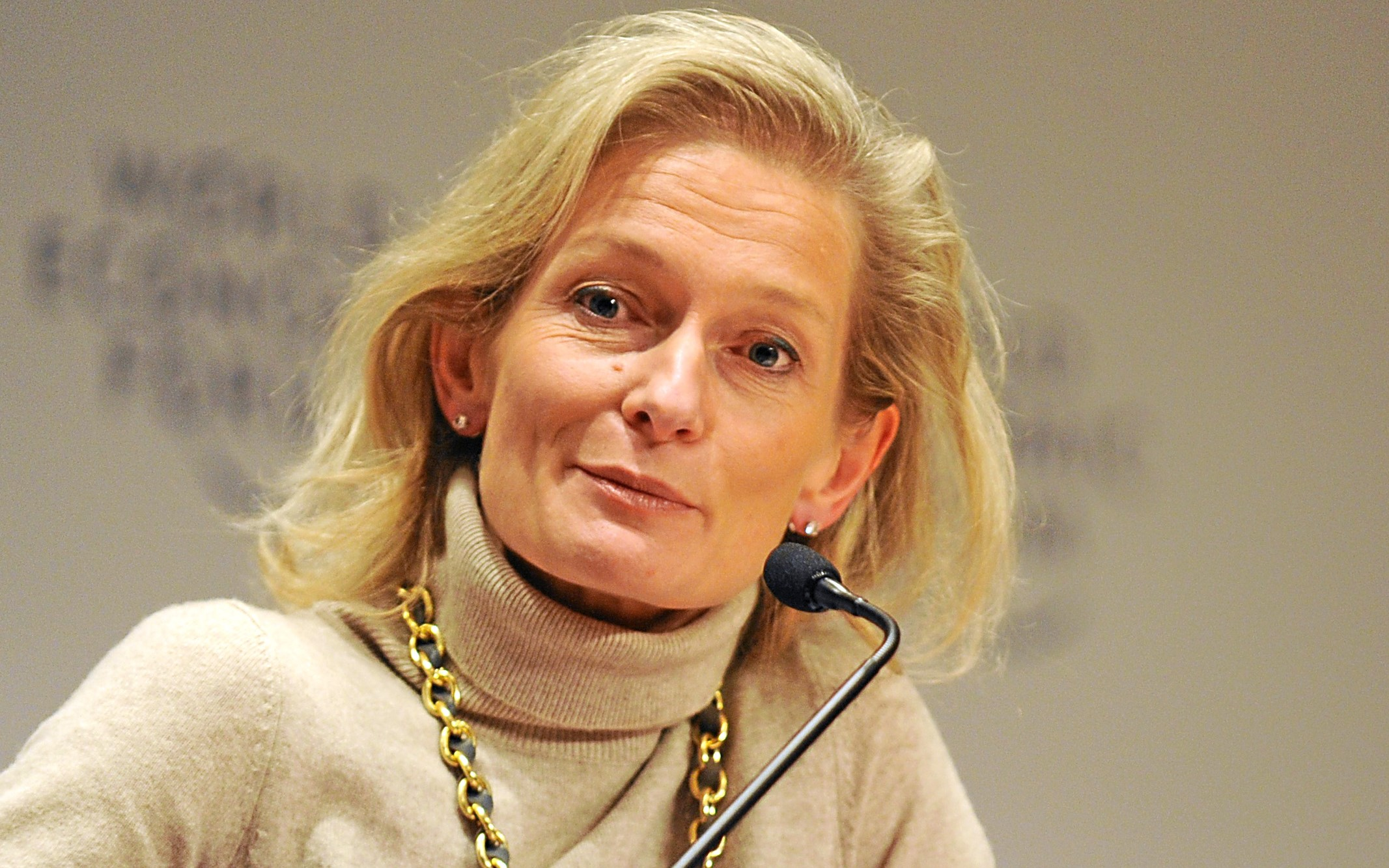
Zanny Minton Beddoes was appointed editor in 2015, first joining as an emerging markets correspondent in 1994.

The editor-in-chief, commonly known as simply "the Editor", of The Economist is charged with formulating the paper's editorial policies and overseeing corporate operations. Since its 1843 founding, the editors have been the following:

- James Wilson: 1843–1857
- Richard Holt Hutton: 1857–1861 (Note: The Concise Dictionary of National Biography makes him assistant editor 1858–1860.)
- Walter Bagehot: 1861–1877 (Note: He was Wilson's son-in-law.)
- Daniel Conner Lathbury: 1877–1881 (Note: A journalist and biographer) (jointly)
- Robert Harry Inglis Palgrave: 1877–1883 (jointly)
- Edward Johnstone: 1883–1907
- Francis Wrigley Hirst: 1907–1916
- Hartley Withers: 1916–1921
- Sir Walter Layton: 1922–1938
- Geoffrey Crowther: 1938–1956
- Donald Tyerman: 1956–1965
- Sir Alastair Burnet: 1965–1974
- Andrew Knight: 1974–1986
- Rupert Pennant-Rea: 1986–1993
- Bill Emmott: 1993–2006
- John Micklethwait: 2006–2014
- Zanny Minton Beddoes: 2015–present

== Tone and voice ==
Although it has many individual columns, by tradition and current practice the newspaper ensures a uniform voice—aided by the anonymity of writers—throughout its pages, as if most articles were written by a single author, which may be perceived to display dry, understated wit, and precise use of language. The Economist's treatment of economics presumes a working familiarity with fundamental concepts of classical economics. For instance, it does not explain terms like invisible hand, macroeconomics, or demand curve, and may take just six or seven words to explain the theory of comparative advantage. Articles involving economics do not presume any formal training on the part of the reader and aim to be accessible to the educated layperson. It usually does not translate short French and German quotes or phrases but describes the business or nature of even well-known entities, writing, for example, "Goldman Sachs, an investment bank". The Economist is known for its extensive use of word play, including puns, allusions, and metaphors, as well as alliteration and assonance, especially in its headlines and captions. This can make it difficult to understand for those who are not native English speakers.

Widely considered as a magazine, The Economist has traditionally and historically persisted in referring to itself as a "newspaper", rather than a "news magazine", despite its switch from broadsheet to perfect-binding format in 1971. On its website the Economist itself clarifies: "By the time the transformation from newspaper to magazine format had been completed, the habit of referring to ourselves as "this newspaper" had stuck."

=== Editorial anonymity ===
The Economist's articles often take a definite editorial stance and almost never carry a byline. Not even the name of the editor is printed in the issue. It is a long-standing tradition that an editor's only signed article during their tenure is written on the occasion of their departure from the position. The author of a piece is named in certain circumstances: when notable persons are invited to contribute opinion pieces; when journalists of The Economist compile special reports (previously known as surveys); for the Year in Review special edition; and to highlight a potential conflict of interest over a book review. The names of The Economist editors and correspondents can be located on the media directory pages of the website. Online blog pieces are signed with the initials of the writer and authors of print stories are allowed to note their authorship from their personal web sites. One anonymous writer of The Economist observed: "This approach is not without its faults (we have four staff members with the initials 'J.P.', for example) but is the best compromise between total anonymity and full bylines, in our view." According to one academic study, the anonymous ethos of the weekly has contributed to strengthening three areas for The Economist: collective and consistent voice, talent and newsroom management, and brand strength.

The editors say this is necessary because "collective voice and personality matter more than the identities of individual journalists", and reflects "a collaborative effort". In most articles, authors refer to themselves as "your correspondent" or "this reviewer". The writers of the titled opinion columns tend to refer to themselves by the title (hence, a sentence in the "Lexington" column might read "Lexington was informed..."). American author and long-time reader Michael Lewis criticised the paper's editorial anonymity in 1991, labelling it a means to hide the youth and inexperience of those writing articles. Although individual articles are written anonymously, there is no secrecy over who the writers are, as they are listed on The Economist's website, which also provides summaries of their careers and academic qualifications. In 2009, Lewis included multiple Economist articles in his anthology about the 2008 financial crisis, Panic: The Story of Modern Financial Insanity.

John Ralston Saul describes The Economist as a newspaper that "hides the names of the journalists who write its articles in order to create the illusion that they dispense disinterested truth rather than opinion. This sales technique, reminiscent of pre-Reformation Catholicism, is not surprising in a publication named after the social science most given to wild guesses and imaginary facts presented in the guise of inevitability and exactitude. That it is the Bible of the corporate executive indicates to what extent received wisdom is the daily bread of a managerial civilization."

== Features ==
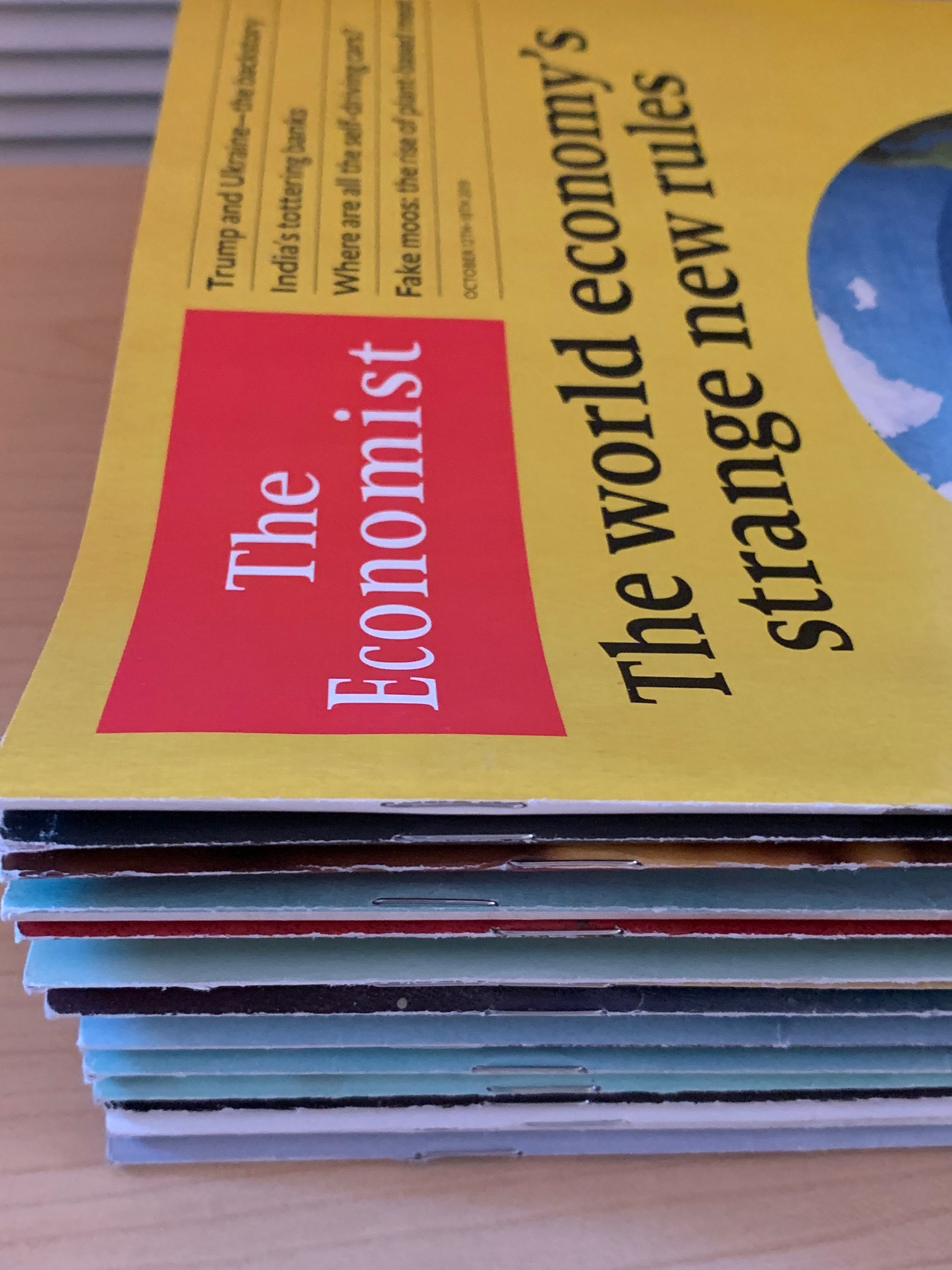
A stack of Economist papers, ordered by publication date, 2020

The Economist's primary focus is world events, politics and business, but it also runs regular sections on science and technology as well as books and the arts. Approximately every two weeks, the publication includes an in-depth special report (previously called surveys) on a given topic. The five main categories are Countries and Regions, Business, Finance and Economics, Science, and Technology. The newspaper goes to press on Thursdays, between 6 p.m. and 7 p.m. GMT, and is available at newsagents in many countries the next day. It is printed at seven sites around the world.

Since July 2007, there has also been a complete audio edition of the paper available 9 pm London time on Thursdays. The audio version of The Economist is produced by the production company Talking Issues. The company records the full text of the newspaper in MP3 format, including the extra pages in the UK edition. The weekly 130 MB download is free for subscribers and available for a fee for non-subscribers. The publication's writers adopt a tight style that seeks to include the maximum amount of information in a limited space. David G. Bradley, publisher of The Atlantic, described the formula as "a consistent world view expressed, consistently, in tight and engaging prose".

=== Letters ===
The Economist frequently receives letters from its readership in response to the previous week's edition. While it is known to feature letters from senior businesspeople, politicians, ambassadors, and spokespeople, the paper includes letters from typical readers as well. Well-written or witty responses from anyone are considered, and controversial issues frequently produce a torrent of letters. For example, the survey of corporate social responsibility, published January 2005, produced largely critical letters from Oxfam, the World Food Programme, United Nations Global Compact, the Chairman of BT Group, an ex-Director of Shell and the UK Institute of Directors.

In an effort to foster diversity of thought, The Economist routinely publishes letters that openly criticize the paper's articles and stance. After The Economist ran a critique of Amnesty International in its issue dated 24 March 2007, its letters page ran a reply from Amnesty, as well as several other letters in support of the organisation, including one from the head of the United Nations Commission on Human Rights. Rebuttals from officials within regimes such as the Singapore government are routinely printed, to comply with local right-of-reply laws without compromising editorial independence.

Letters published in the paper are typically between 150 and 200 words long and had the now-discontinued salutation 'Sir' from 1843 to 2015. In the latter year, upon the appointment of Zanny Minton Beddoes, the first female editor, the salutation was dismissed; letters have since had no salutation. Prior to a change in procedure, all responses to online articles were published in "The Inbox".

=== Columns ===
The publication runs several opinion columns whose names reflect their topic:

- Ashoka (India): named for Ashoka the Great, this column was launched in May 2026 and is written by Leo Mirani.
- Bagehot (Britain): named for Walter Bagehot, 19th-century British constitutional expert and the third editor of The Economist. First published in 1989, since 2022, it has been written by Duncan Robinson, who succeeded Adrian Woolridge.
- Banyan (Asia): named for the banyan tree, this column was established in April 2009 and focuses on various issues across the Asian continent and is written by Dominic Ziegler. This column was discontinued in 2026 with the establishment of the Ashoka column.
- Bartleby (Work and management): named after the titular character of a Herman Melville short story, this column was established in May 2018. It was written by Philip Coggan until August 2021. Since then, it has been written by Andrew Palmer.
- Buttonwood (Finance): named for the buttonwood tree where early Wall Street traders gathered. Until September 2006, this was available only as an on-line column, but it is now included in the print edition. Since 2018, it is written by John O'Sullivan, succeeding Philip Coggan.
- Chaguan (China): named for Chaguan, the traditional Chinese Tea houses in Chengdu, this column was established in September 2018. It was previously written by David Rennie, but was suspended in October 2024 when Rennie left Beijing to become the Geopolitics editor for The Economist. The column was brought back in September 2025 when Simon Rabinovitch took over as The Economist Beijing Bureau Chief.
- Charlemagne (Europe): named for Charlemagne, the first Holy Roman Emperor. It is written by Stanley Pignal, The Economist's Brussels bureau chief. It has previously been written by Jeremy Cliffe and earlier it was written by David Rennie (2007–2010) and by Anton La Guardia (2010–2014).
- Johnson (language): named for Samuel Johnson, this column returned to print publication in 2016 and covers language. It is written by Robert Lane Greene.
- Lexington (United States): named for Lexington, Massachusetts, the site of the beginning of the American Revolutionary War. From June 2010 until May 2012, it was written by Peter David, until his death in a car accident. The column is currently written by James Bennet.
- Schumpeter (Business): named for the economist Joseph Schumpeter, this column was established in September 2009 and was written by Patrick Foulis. Since 2026 it has been written by Tom Bennett.
- The Telegram (International): named after the Long Telegram written by George Kennan, this column has a focus on geopolitics. It is written by David Rennie and was established in November 2024.
- Free Exchange (Economics): a general economics column, frequently based on academic research, replaced the column Economics Focus in January 2012
- Obituary (recent death): since 2003, it has been written by Ann Wroe.

=== TQ ===
Every three months, The Economist publishes a technology report called Technology Quarterly, or simply, TQ, a special section focusing on recent trends and developments in science and technology. The feature is also known to intertwine "economic matters with a technology". The TQ often carries a theme, such as quantum computing or cloud storage, and assembles an assortment of articles around the common subject.

=== 1843 ===
In September 2007, The Economist launched a sister lifestyle magazine under the title Intelligent Life as a quarterly publication. At its inauguration it was billed as for "the arts, style, food, wine, cars, travel and anything else under the sun, as long as it's interesting". The magazine focuses on analysing the "insights and predictions for the luxury landscape" across the world. Approximately ten years later, in March 2016, the newspaper's parent company, Economist Group, rebranded the lifestyle magazine as 1843, in honour of the paper's founding year. It has since remained at six issues per year and carries the motto "Stories of An Extraordinary World". Author names appear next to their articles in 1843.

1843 features contributions from Economist journalists as well as writers around the world and photography commissioned for each issue. It is seen as a market competitor to The Wall Street Journal's WSJ. and the Financial Times' FT Magazine. Since its March 2016 relaunch, it has been edited by Rosie Blau, a former correspondent for The Economist.

In May 2020, it was announced that the 1843 magazine would move to a digital-only format.

=== The World Ahead ===
The paper also produces two annual reviews and predictive reports titled The World In [Year] and The World If [Year] as part of their The World Ahead franchise. In both features, the newspaper publishes a review of the social, cultural, economic and political events that have shaped the year and will continue to influence the immediate future. The issue was described by the American think tank Brookings Institution as "The Economist's annual [150-page] exercise in forecasting". Translated versions of The World In [Year] are distributed, e.g. by Jang Group in Pakistan (Urdu) and by Roularta in Flanders (Dutch).

=== Country of the Year ===
In 2013, The Economist began awarding a 'Country of the Year' in its annual Christmas special editions. Selected by the newspaper, this award recognises the country that was 'most improved' over the preceding year.

Year	Choice	Notes
2013	Uruguay	For legalising recreational marijuana and same-sex marriage
2014	Tunisia	For a peaceful transition of power amidst the Arab Winter
2015	Myanmar	For political and economic liberalisation (the 2011–2015 Myanmar political reforms)
2016	Colombia	For reaching a peace agreement in the Colombian peace process
2017	France	For supporting "open society" with the election and first calendar year of the Presidency of Emmanuel Macron
2018	Armenia	For opposing "corruption and incompetence" through the 2018 Armenian Revolution
2019	Uzbekistan	For economic and political reforms
2020	Malawi	For increased democratisation as part of the 2020 Malawian presidential election
2021	Italy	For economic reforms and effective COVID-19 vaccination program
2022	Ukraine	For resisting the 2022 Russian invasion of Ukraine
2023	Greece	For economic reforms and political stability
2024	Bangladesh	For overthrowing Sheikh Hasina and transitioning "towards a more liberal government"
2025	Syria	For a stabilising post-Assad transition

=== Books ===
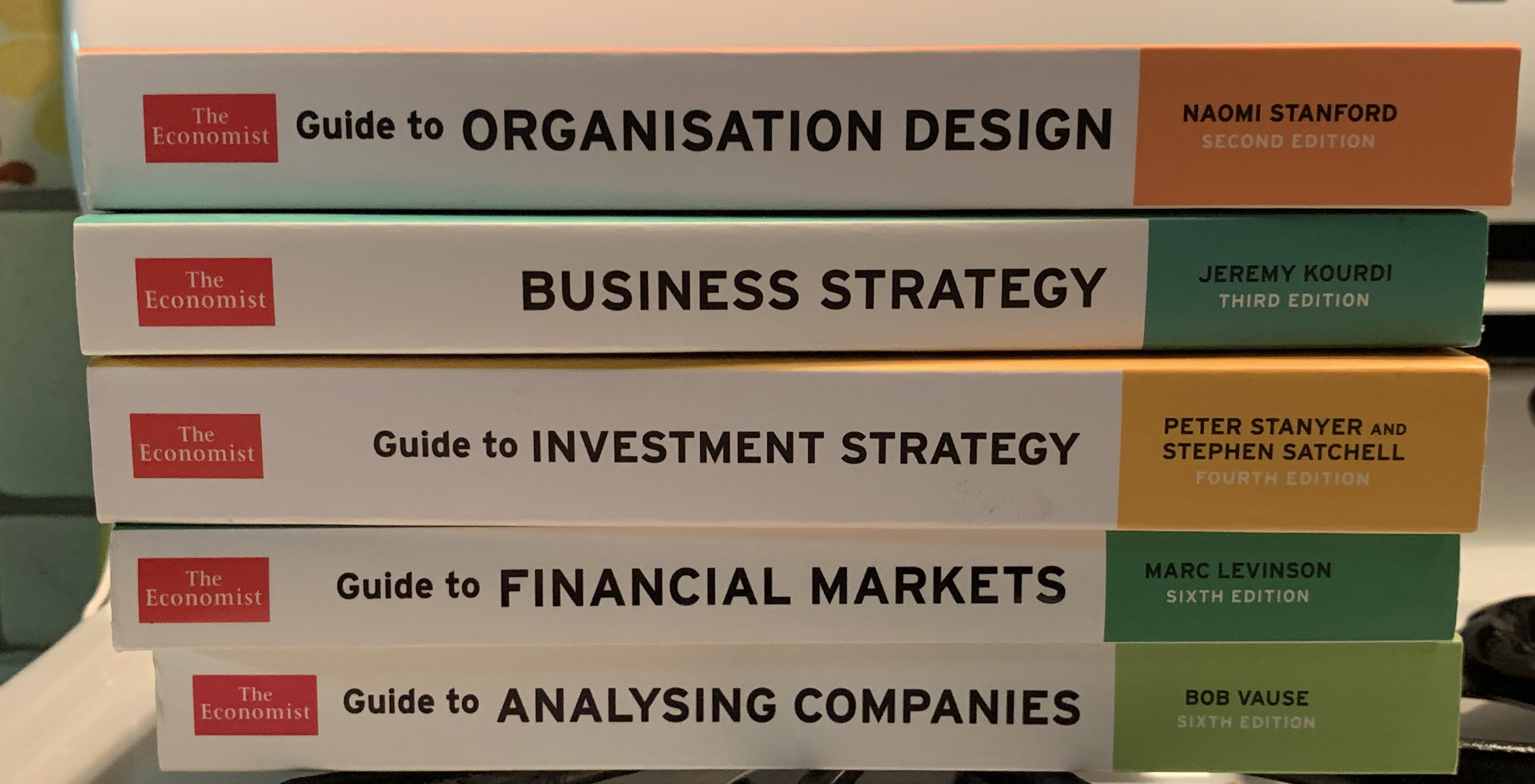
A series technical manuals from The Economist, 2020

In addition to publishing its main newspaper, lifestyle magazine, and special features, The Economist also produces books with topics overlapping with that of its newspaper. The weekly also publishes a series of technical manuals (or guides) as an offshoot of its explanatory journalism. Some of these books serve as collections of articles and columns the paper produces. Often columnists from the newspaper write technical manuals on their topic of expertise; for example, Philip Coggan, a finance correspondent, authored The Economist Guide to Hedge Funds (2011).

The paper publishes book reviews in every issue, with a large collective review in their year-end (holiday) issue – published as "The Economist's Books of the Year". Additionally, the paper has its own in-house stylebook rather than following an industry-wide writing style template. All Economist writing, and publications follow The Economist Style Guide, in various editions.

=== Writing competitions ===
The Economist sponsors a wide array of writing competitions and prizes throughout the year for readers. In 1999, The Economist organised a global futurist writing competition, The World in 2050. Co-sponsored by Royal Dutch/Shell, the competition included a first prize of US$20,000 and publication in The Economist's annual flagship publication, The World In. Over 3,000 entries from around the world were submitted via a website set up for the purpose and at various Royal Dutch Shell offices worldwide. The judging panel included Bill Emmott, Esther Dyson, Sir Mark Moody-Stuart, and Matt Ridley.

In the summer of 2019, they launched the Open Future writing competition with an inaugural youth essay-writing prompt about climate change. During this competition, the paper accepted a submission from an artificially-intelligent computer writing program.

=== Podcasts ===
Since 2006, The Economist has produced several podcast series. The podcasts currently in production include:

- The Intelligence (general news)
- Editor's Picks (audio recordings of published articles)
- Drum Tower (China)
- Babbage (technology)
- Money Talks (finance and business)
- Checks and Balance (American politics)
- The Weekend Intelligence (long-form reports on a single topic)

Additionally, The Economist has produced several limited-run podcast series, such as The Prince (on Xi Jinping), Next Year in Moscow (on Russian emigrants and dissidents following the 2022 invasion of Ukraine), Boss Class (on business management) and Scam Inc, an eight-part series about the growing business and impact of scams.

In September 2023, The Economist announced the launch of Economist Podcasts+, a paid subscription service for its podcast offerings.

=== Espresso news app ===
In 2014 The Economist launched its short-form news app Espresso. The product offers a daily briefing from the editors, published every day of the week except Sunday. The app is available to paid subscribers and as a separate subscription.

== Data journalism ==
The presence of data journalism in The Economist can be traced to its founding year in 1843. Initially, the weekly published basic international trade figures and tables. The paper first included a graphical model in 1847—a letter featuring an illustration of various coin sizes—and its first non-epistolary chart—a tree map visualising the size of coal fields in America and England—was included in November 1854. This early adoption of data-based articles was estimated to be "a 100 years before the field's modern emergence" by Data Journalism.com. Its transition from broadsheet to magazine-style formatting led to the adoption of coloured graphs, first in fire-engine-red during the 1980s and then in a thematic blue in 2001. The Economist's editors and readers developed a taste for more data-driven stories throughout the 2000s. Starting in the late-2000s, the paper began to publish more and more articles that centred solely on charts, some of which were published online every weekday. These "daily charts" are typically followed by a short, 500-word explanation. In September 2009, The Economist launched a Twitter account for their Data Team.

In 2015, the data-journalism department—a dedicated team of data journalists, visualisers and interactive developers—was created to head up the paper's data journalism efforts. The team's output soon included election forecasting models, covering the French presidential elections of 2017 and 2022 and the US presidential and congressional elections in 2020, among others. In late-2023, the data team advertised for a political data scientist to bolster its political forecasting efforts. In order to ensure transparency in the team's data collection and analysis The Economist maintains a corporate GitHub account to publicly disclose their models and software wherever possible. In October 2018, they introduced a "Graphic Detail" featuring large charts and maps in both their print and digital editions which ran until November 2023.

=== Indexes ===
Historically, the publication has also maintained a section of economic statistics, such as employment figures, economic growth, and interest rates. These statistical publications have been found to be seen as authoritative and decisive in British society.

Some of the most well-known data indexes published by the Economist include:

- The Big Mac Index: a measure of the purchasing power of currencies, first published in 1986, using the price of the hamburger in different countries. This is published twice a year since 2006, annually prior to that.
- A Democracy Index: a measure of the state of democracy in the world, produced by the Economist Intelligence Unit (EIU).
- The Glass Ceiling Index: a measure of female equality in the workplace.
- The Most Dangerous Cities Index: a measure of major cities by rates of homicide.
- Commodity-Price Index: a measure of commodities, such as gold and brent oil, as well as agricultural items.

The Economist also publishes a variety of rankings seeking to position business schools and undergraduate universities among each other, respectively. In 2015, they published their first ranking of U.S. universities, focusing on comparable economic advantages. Their data for the rankings is sourced from the U.S. Department of Education and is calculated as a function of median earnings through regression analysis.

== Opinions and editorial stances ==
The editorial stance of The Economist primarily revolves around classical, social, and most notably, economic liberalism. Since its founding, it has supported radical centrism, favouring policies and governments that maintain centrist politics. The Economist typically champions neoliberalism, particularly free markets, free trade, free immigration, deregulation, and globalisation. When The Economist was founded, the term economism denoted what would today be termed "economic liberalism". The activist and journalist George Monbiot has described it as neoliberal, albeit that occasionally it is accepting of the propositions of Keynesian economics where these were deemed more "reasonable". The Economist favours a carbon tax to help reduce pollution and emissions and fight global warming. According to one former editor, Bill Emmott, "The Economist's philosophy has always been liberal, not conservative". Like other publications, such as The Guardian, The Observer and The Independent, The Economist supports the United Kingdom becoming a republic.

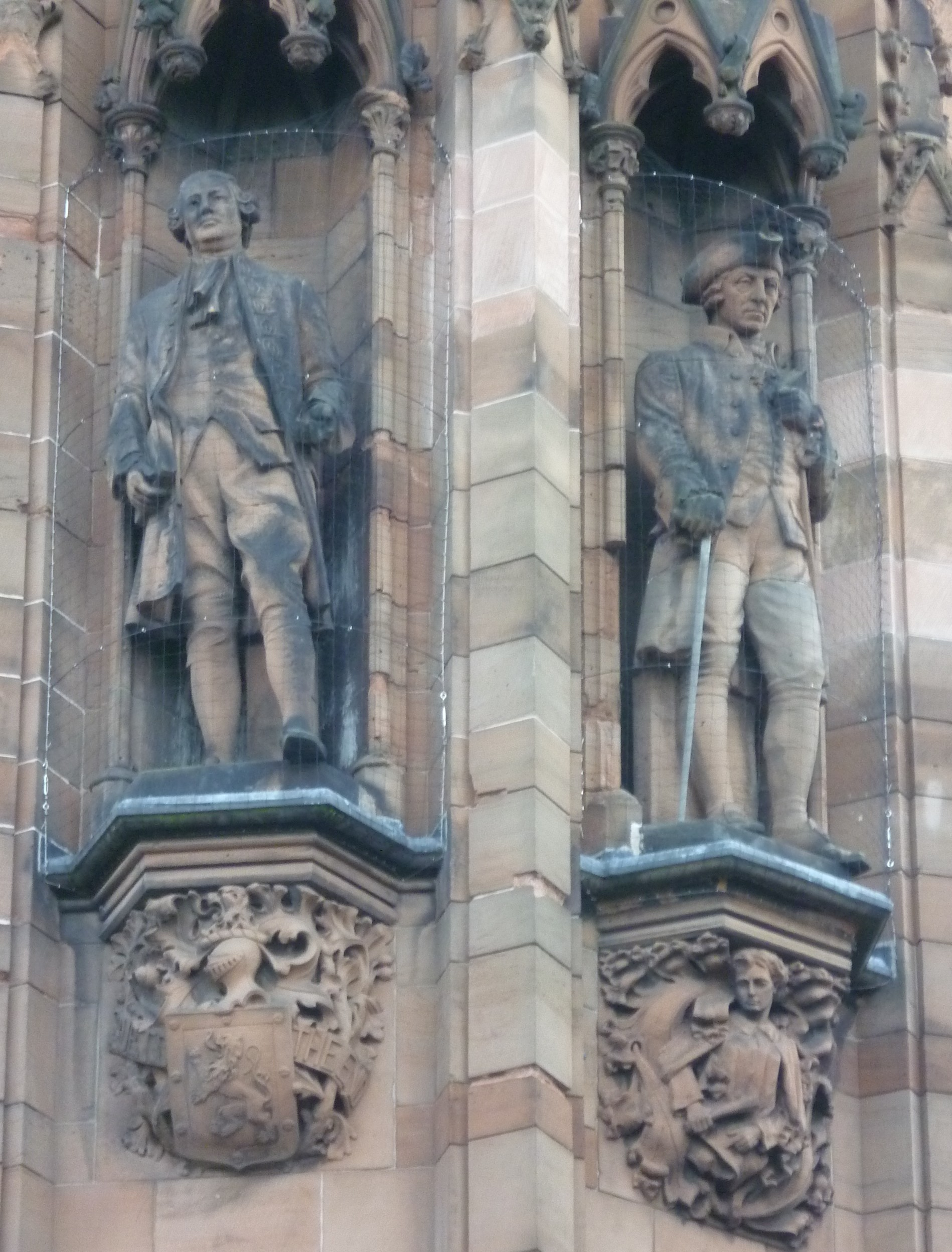
Scottish economist Adam Smith (right) and philosopher David Hume (left) represent The Economist's foundational beliefs of laissez-faire policies, self-sufficiency, anti-protectionism and free trade.

Individual contributors take diverse views. The Economist favours the support, through central banks, of banks and other important corporations. This principle can, in a much more limited form, be traced back to Walter Bagehot, the third editor of The Economist, who argued that the Bank of England should support major banks that got into difficulties. Karl Marx deemed The Economist the "European organ" of "the aristocracy of finance". At the same time, the magazine has criticised the inefficiency and regressivity of the U.S. tax model.

The Economist has supported reforms addressing social issues such as recognition of gay marriages, legalisation of drugs, and seems to support some government regulation on health issues, such as smoking in public, as well as bans on smacking children. The Economist consistently favours guest worker programmes, parental choice of school, and immigration reform. It once published an "obituary" of God, a particularly British example perhaps of its often ironic and iconoclastic issue framing. The Economist also has a long record of supporting gun control. In 2021, it was criticized for publishing an "anti-transgender screed". In 2019, The Economist received backlash for suggesting that transgender people should be sterilized; it subsequently apologized for this statement.

In recent British general elections, The Economist has endorsed the center-left Labour Party (in 2005 and 2024), the right wing Conservative Party (in 2010 and 2015), and the Liberal Democrats (in 2017 and 2019). It has supported both Republican and Democratic candidates in the United States.

In 2008, The Economist commented that Cristina Fernández de Kirchner, the Peronist/progressive president of Argentina at the time, was "dashing hopes of change" and "leading her country into economic peril and social conflict". The magazine called for Bill Clinton's impeachment, as well as for Donald Rumsfeld's resignation after the emergence of the Abu Ghraib torture and prisoner abuse. Although The Economist initially gave vigorous support to the U.S.-led invasion of Iraq, it later called the operation "bungled from the start" and criticised the "almost criminal negligence" of the Bush Administration's handling of the Iraq War, while maintaining in 2007 that pulling out in the short term would be irresponsible.

The Economist put its stance this way in 2016:

What, besides free trade and free markets, does The Economist believe in? "It is to the Radicals that The Economist still likes to think of itself as belonging. The extreme centre is the paper's historical position". That is as true today as when Crowther [Geoffrey, Economist editor 1938–1956] said it in 1955. The Economist considers itself the enemy of privilege, pomposity and predictability. It has backed conservatives such as Ronald Reagan and Margaret Thatcher. It has supported the Americans in Vietnam. But it has also endorsed Harold Wilson and Bill Clinton, and espoused a variety of liberal causes: opposing capital punishment from its earliest days, while favouring penal reform and decolonisation, as well as—more recently—gun control and gay marriage.

In an editorial marking its 175th anniversary, The Economist criticised adherents to liberalism for becoming too inclined to protect the political status quo rather than pursue reform. It called on liberals to return to advocating for bold political, economic and social reforms: protecting free markets, land and tax reform in the tradition of Georgism, open immigration, a rethink of the social contract with more emphasis on education, and a revival of liberal internationalism.

== Circulation ==
Each of The Economist issues' official date range is from Saturday to the following Friday. The Economist posts each week's new content online at approximately 21:00 Thursday evening UK time, ahead of the official publication date. From July to December 2019, their average global print circulation was over 909,476. As of September 2025, combined print and digital circulation was reported at 1.255 million. However, on a weekly average basis, the paper can reach up to 5.1 million readers, across their print and digital runs. Across their social media platforms, it reaches an audience of 35 million, as of 2016.

Circulation grew steadily in its early years. In 1844, it was 1,800, 3,800 in 1850 and had risen to 4,300 by 1854. In 1877, the publication's circulation was 3,700, and in 1920 it had risen to 6,000. Circulation increased rapidly after 1945, reaching 100,000 by 1970. Circulation is audited by the Audit Bureau of Circulations (ABC). From around 30,000 in 1960, it had risen to nearly one million by 2000 and by 2016 to about 1.3 million. Approximately half of all sales (54%) originate in the United States, with sales in the United Kingdom making 14% of the total and continental Europe 19%. Of its American readers, two out of three earn more than $100,000 a year. The Economist has sales, both by subscription and at newsagents, in over 200 countries. The Economist once boasted about its limited circulation. In the early 1990s, it used the slogan "The Economist – not read by millions of people". Geoffrey Crowther, a former editor, wrote: "Never in the history of journalism has so much been read for so long by so few."

== Censorship ==
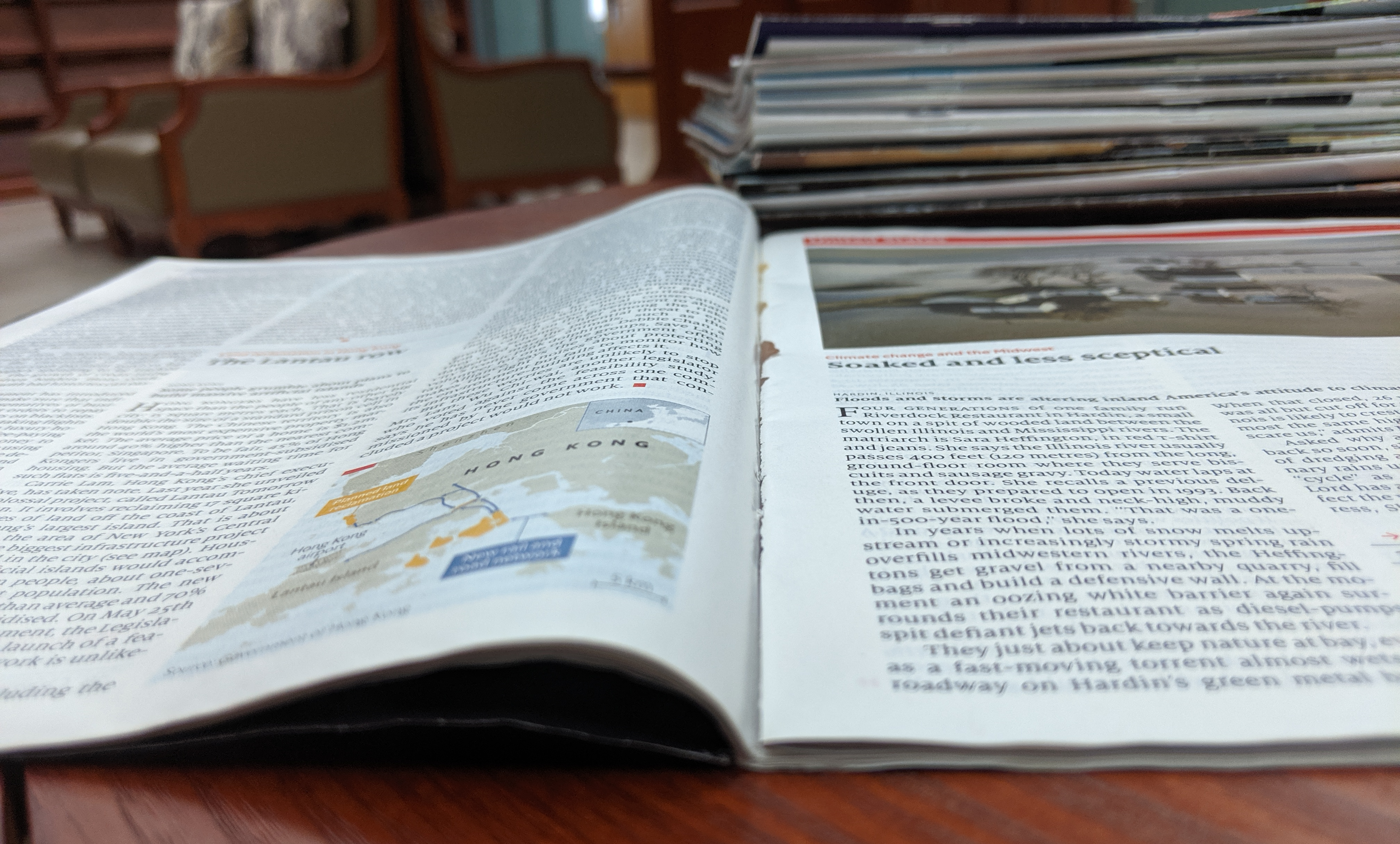
A copy of The Economist in Liaoning Provincial Library. Page 28 from the 1 June 2019 issue, about the 1989 Tiananmen Square Protests, has been removed.

Sections of The Economist criticising authoritarian regimes are frequently removed from the paper by the authorities in those countries. On 15 June 2006, Iran banned the sale of The Economist when it published a map labelling the Persian Gulf simply as Gulf—a choice that derives its political significance from the Persian Gulf naming dispute. On 29 May 2025, Reuters reported that Vietnam had banned the May 24 issue featuring the president Tô Lâm that described him as "an ambitious leader who emerged "from the security state" and who "must turn himself into a reformer" to adjust the country's economic model and make it richer".

In 2002, the government of Zimbabwe went further and imprisoned The Economist's correspondent there, Andrew Meldrum. The government charged him with violating a statute on "publishing untruth" for writing that a woman was decapitated by supporters of the ruling Zimbabwe African National Union – Patriotic Front party. The decapitation claim was retracted, and Meldrum acquitted of the charges in a Zimbabwean court, but in May 2003, Meldrum was abducted by Zimbabwean authorities and forcibly expelled to South Africa.

On 19 August 2013, The Economist disclosed that the Missouri Department of Corrections had censored its issue of 29 June 2013. According to the letter sent by the department, prisoners were not allowed to receive the issue because "1. it constitutes a threat to the security or discipline of the institution; 2. may facilitate or encourage criminal activity; or 3. may interfere with the rehabilitation of an offender".

== See also ==
- List of business newspapers
- List of newspapers in the United Kingdom
