= Dominic Ziegler =

British-Singaporean columnist

Dominic Ziegler writes the Banyan column, which focuses on Asian-related issues, for The Economist.

Ziegler served as the newspaper's China correspondent from 1994 to 2000, and as Tokyo Bureau Chief from 2005 to 2009.

He published his first book in 2015 titled Black Dragon River: A Journey Down the Amur River Between Russia and China.

In 2023, he moved to Singapore.
