= TD Tom Davies =

British handmade eyewear brand

- Type: Private Company
- Industry: Fashion
- Founded: 2002
- Headquarters: London, United Kingdom
- Products: Sunglasses and Optical
- Website: www.tdtomdavies.com

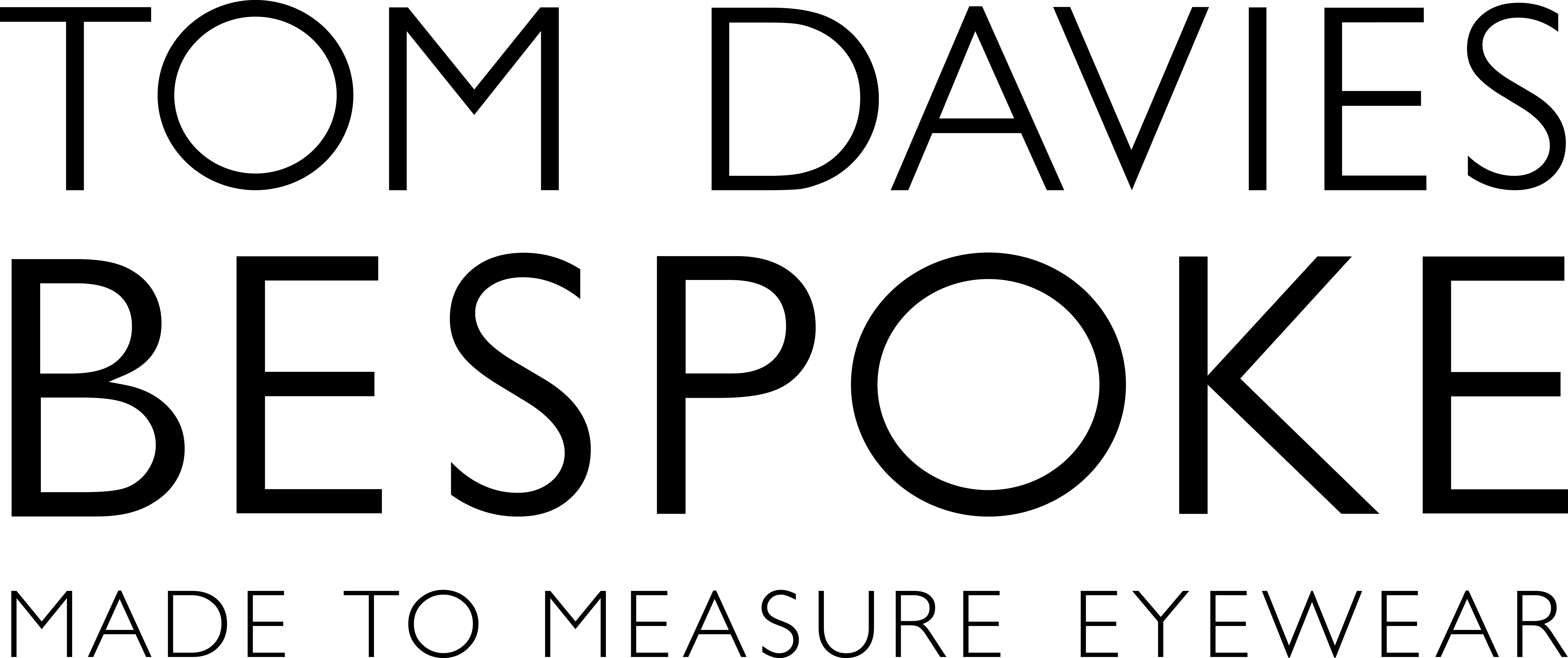
logo of TD Tom Davies

Tom Davies Bespoke is a British handmade eyewear brand, founded by Tom Davies Bespoke in 2002. Tom Davies offers a bespoke service on all frames of their collections. Its headquarters is in West London.

== History ==
In 1996, Tom Davies moved to China after leaving university. There he began working as a designer for a start-up eyewear factory in Hong Kong, designing frames and the machinery that made them. Back in London in 2002, he created TD Tom Davies and started to offer its bespoke eyewear service to opticians worldwide allowing an optician to design unique, made-to-measure frames themselves much like an eyewear-specific visit to Savile Row for a suit. Tom Davies opened his own factory in china in 2008 to enable bespoke spectacle production. Further, Tom Davies moved his production from China to the United Kingdom in 2017 by opening his own made in London factory located in West London.

== Tom Davies Bespoke Opticians Stores ==
Besides being sold in opticians in over 23 countries worldwide, Tom Davies also owns four flagship stores, all based in central London. They can be found at Sloane Square, Knightsbridge, Canary Wharf and The Royal Exchange.

The Tom Davies Bespoke Optician stores include an eye examination clinic which is stocked solely with ZEISS optical testing machinery and is the only private practice in the UK to have all the latest diagnostic equipment available from ZEISS. With the equipment of ZEISS, Tom Davies is able to conduct an eye examination which is as accurate and precise as the ones from the ophthalmology clinics. Further, it is 84% more accurate than a manual eye test.

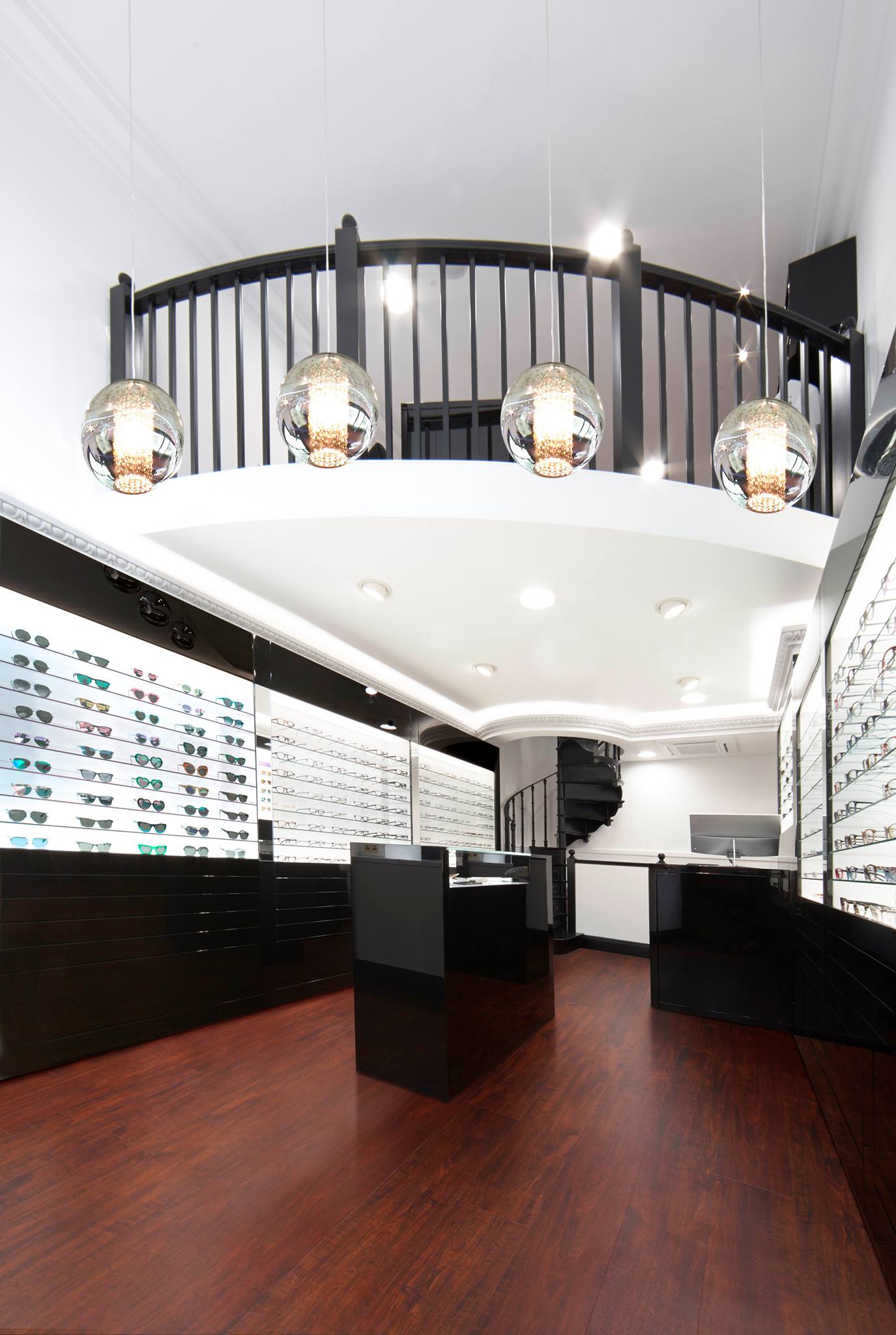
The Royal Exchange, Tom Davies Bespoke Optician Store

== Celebrity following ==
Heston Blumenthal's spectacles are both bespoke pairs made by Tom Davies Other celebrities who have worn TD Tom Davies glasses include: Brad Pitt, Carrie Fisher, Kristen Stewart, Angelina Jolie, Matt Bellamy and Rowan Atkinson

== Products ==
TD Tom Davies spectacles can be made of cotton acetate, titanium, natural horn and precious metals. They retail for an average of £378.

In 2018, Tom Davies became the first ever eyewear brand to create sunglasses that feature rhodium coated lenses.

As of 2016, Tom Davies offers a new service called Made To Order. The services enables opticians to make easier changes, order bespoke frames for their clients and offers features such as laser engraving the customers name on the temple arm.

== Film work ==
Tom Davies designed and manufactured all the eyewear in The Matrix Resurrections including for the characters Neo, Trinity and Morpheus.

The glasses Henry Cavill wears as Clark Kent in Batman v Superman: Dawn of Justice are made by British spectacle designer Tom Davies. Apparently the costume designer found most glasses sat too high on Henry Cavill's face because he has a high bridge. They sought out Tom Davies, who makes bespoke glasses, to design a one-off pair of spectacles for the job.

Tom Davies also made the glasses for Brad Pitt's character in Allied. Angelina Jolie wore a pair of limited edition Tom Davies frames in the movie The Tourist.

Tom Davies has designed the glasses worn by Academy Award-winning actresses Emma Stone and Emma Thompson in Disney film Cruella.

== Collaborations ==
Tom Davies collaborated in 2015 with fashion designer Lulu Liu for a series of signature frames. In 2018, Tom Davies collaborated with fashion designer Yang Li for a runway show for Paris Fashion week.

== Administration ==
In June 2025, Tom Davies Bespoke Eyewear Limited, the company behind the Tom Davies eyewear business, entered administration. Colin David Wilson and Trevor John Binyon of Opus Restructuring LLP were appointed joint administrators on 10 June 2025.
