= Sue Cook (disambiguation) =

Sue Cook is a television presenter.

Sue Cook may also refer to:

- Sue Cook (racewalker)
- Sue Weinlein Cook, game designer
- Suzanne Cook (now Suzanne Heywood), executive and former civil servant

== See also ==
- Suzan Johnson Cook(born 1957), U.S. presidential advisor, pastor, theologian, author, activist, and academic
