= Intelligent life =

Intelligent life may refer to:

- Intelligence including:
  - Animal cognition
  - Extraterrestrial intelligence, i.e. Intelligent life forms originating from outside Earth's planetary boundaries, whether theoretical or having existence past or present or future yet not discovered by terrestrial intelligence as of 2023 CE within Earth-centric chronology.
  - Sapience, wisdom or the ability of an organism or entity to act with appropriate judgment
- Intelligent Life (magazine), published by The Economist Group
