= Exor (company) =

Investment company incorporated in Netherlands

Exor N.V.
- Formerly: Istituto Finanziario Industriale
- Type: Public
- Traded as: Euronext Amsterdam: ΕXO; Xetra: EYX; AEX component
- ISIN: NL0012059018
- Industry: Holding company
- Founded: 27 July 1927; 99 years ago
- Founder: Giovanni Agnelli
- Headquarters: Amsterdam, Netherlands
- Key people: John Elkann (CEO); Nitin Nohria (independent chairman); Suzanne Heywood (COO); Guido De Boer (CFO)
- Products: Diversified investments, automotive, healthcare, tech, media, heavy equipment, sports,
- Owner: Agnelli family (through Giovanni Agnelli B.V.) (56.93%)
- Website: exor.com

Exor NV is the listed holding company of the Italian Agnelli family.

It is incorporated in the Netherlands, listed on Euronext Amsterdam, and controlled through the privately held company Giovanni Agnelli BV (owned by members of the extended Agnelli family).

It has a history of investments running over a century, originating from senator Giovanni Agnelli, the founder of Fiat. Its holding include auto and truck manufacturers Stellantis, Ferrari, and Iveco (until 2025), agricultural and construction firm CNH Industrial, health technology company Philips, the association football club Juventus FC, the international current affairs magazine The Economist, and the Italian media company GEDI Gruppo Editoriale, as well as several other minor investments. In May 2023, Exor launched its investment management company Lingotto.

== History ==
=== Founding and growth (1927–2007) ===
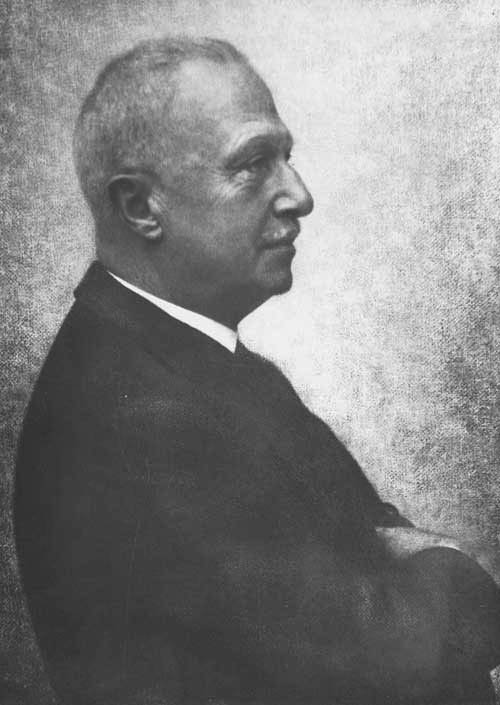
Giovanni Agnelli, founder of Exor

The company was founded in Turin on 27 July 1927 under the name of Istituto Finanziario Industriale (IFI) by the then senator Giovanni Agnelli, with the aim of reuniting under a single company all the shareholdings he had acquired, mainly in industrial sectors, including his stake as the largest shareholder in FIAT. When he died in 1945, he left his shareholding to his descendants, giving the largest share (35%) to his oldest grandson, Gianni Agnelli.

In 1957, IFI acquired control of Istituto Commerciale Laniero Italiano (ICLI), which conducted activities in the financial field, particularly in the textile and wool sector. In 1963, ICLI extended its operations to the banking system and changed its name to Istituto Bancario Italiano Laniero. Three years later, having spun off the banking business to Banca Subalpina, the company became Istituto Finanziario Italiano Laniero (IFIL), playing a parallel role to that of IFI and conducting similar investment management activities, under the management of the Agnelli family.

IFI listed preference shares (with no voting rights) on the Borsa Italiana in 1968. Over the following decades, while remaining the largest shareholder in FIAT, IFI gained holdings in numerous firms, including Buzzi Unicem, Rockefeller Center, Cinzano, Club Med, 3M and a minority stake in Swiss bank SGS.

In 1984, Gianni Agnelli created Giovanni Agnelli S.r.l., a holding company to consolidate the family ownership in IFI and prevent outsiders from acquiring voting shares. In 1987, with more family members joining the holding company (then renamed Giovanni Agnelli e C. S.a.p.az.), its control amounted to over 70% of IFI ordinary shares. By 2000, it had acquired 100% of the ordinary shares, with only non-voting preference shares left on the market.

In 2003, the company was restructured, under the leadership of Umberto Agnelli, its chairman. All shares in operational subsidiaries, including FIAT, were transferred to IFIL, which was then renamed IFIL Investments. IFI remained the parent holding company, through its ownership of 62.03% of IFIL ordinary shares and a stake in the Exor Group (a Luxembourg investment company that had been acquired in 1991).

In April 2007 John Elkann, who had been nominated as his successor and largest shareholder by Gianni Agnelli, assumed the chairmanship of IFI.

=== Restructuring as Exor and early investments (2008–2016) ===
With the aim of simplifying the capital structure, on 1 March 2009 IFIL Investments merged with and into IFI to create Exor S.p.A., the new listed holding company of the Agnelli group. John Elkann was named Chairman and Carlo Sant’Albano was appointed CEO. All classes of shares (savings shares, preference shares and ordinary shares) were listed on Borsa Italiana. As a result of the merger, Giovanni Agnelli e C. S.a.p.az. held 59.2% of the ordinary shares of Exor, exercising control in all ordinary matters. At the time of the merger, Exor's net asset value (NAV) per share was €12.95.

On 3 January 2011, Fiat executed a spin-off of its industrial vehicles division: as a result, Exor became the largest shareholder in the new Fiat Industrial, listed on Borsa Italiana. On 11 February 2011, John Elkann assumed the post of CEO of Exor, while retaining his role as chairman of the board.

In 2013, Exor announced plans to convert all outstanding preference and saving shares in its share capital into ordinary shares, to further simplify its capital structure. The conversion, approved by shareholders on 20 March, was executed on 24 June 2013. After the conversion, Giovanni Agnelli e C. S.a.p.az retained ownership of 51.39% of Exor's share capital.

In June 2013, Exor sold its 15% stake in Swiss bank SGS for a total consideration of €2 billion, generating €1.53 billion in capital gain. On 29 September 2013, Fiat Industrial and CNH Global merged to form CNH Industrial N.V., a new leader in trucking, agricultural machinery and construction equipment. The company is headquartered in London, incorporated in the Netherlands, and is listed on the NYSE and Borsa Italiana. Exor remained the controlling shareholder of the new entity.

After acquiring the last outstanding shares of the Chrysler Group, which it had saved from bankruptcy in 2009, Fiat announced plans to merge the two companies to form Fiat Chrysler Automobiles, the eight-largest automotive company in the world. The new company was incorporated in the Netherlands (because of its laws on double voting shares) and listed on both the NYSE and Borsa Italiana. The merger was completed on 12 October 2014.

On 12 August 2015, it was announced Exor would purchase three-fifths of The Economist Group shares then owned by Pearson PLC, which had held a non-controlling 50% stake since 1928. With the deal considered to be the "most important change to The Economist's shareholding structure in almost 90 years", the transaction was completed in August 2015, with about 50% of the Economist Group sold for about $715 million back to the group itself, as well as Exor S.p.A. As a result, Exor became the largest shareholder in The Economist, with a 43.4% stake. On 2 September 2015, Exor sold Cushman & Wakefield to Chicago-based DTZ for $1.28 billion, generating a capital gain of $722 million.

With a press release on 14 April 2015, Exor announced a tender offer to acquire PartnerRe, a Bermuda-based insurance company, for $6.4 billion. After months of public negotiations due to a competing bid from Axis Capital, Exor signed an agreement to acquire PartnerRe on 3 August 2015, valuing the company at $6.9 billion. The acquisition was completed on 18 March 2016. After closing, Exor transferred around €660 million of assets to PartnerRe.

After initially selling a 9% stake through an IPO on the NYSE in October 2015, FCA announced that it would distribute its remaining 81% interest in Ferrari N.V. to shareholders. Ferrari N.V. is the Netherlands holding company that owns luxury car manufacturer Ferrari SpA. On 4 January 2016, Ferrari shares began trading on Borsa Italiana, and Exor acquired a 23.5% shareholding (with 33.4% of voting rights). Exor also signed a shareholder agreement concerning Ferrari with Piero Ferrari (10% owner with 15.4% of voting rights).

On 10 February 2016, Exor acquired a 13% shareholding in Welltec, a Danish robotics company, for €103.3 million.

=== Relocation to the Netherlands and creation of Stellantis (2016–2021) ===
Exor announced on 25 July 2016 that it would relocate its legal and fiscal domicile to the Netherlands, with the purpose of aligning its capital structure with that of major subsidiaries. It will also benefit from a favourable taxation of dividends and would be allowed to employ a system of special voting shares (giving each shareholder 5 votes after 5 years of ownership and 10 votes after 10 years of ownership). The operation would be conducted through a cross-border merger of Exor S.p.A. with and into its Dutch subsidiary Exor Holding N.V., which would then be renamed Exor N.V. and its shares listed on Borsa Italiana.

The merger, which was approved by shareholders on 3 September 2016, was executed on 11 December 2016, and Exor N.V. shares began trading on the following day. John Elkann was confirmed as chairman and CEO, while Marc Bolland was named Senior Non-executive Director (a position required by Dutch Law when the chairman is not independent). Sergio Marchionne and Alessandro Nasi were subsequently named vice-chairmen.

On 2 July 2017, FCA distributed its 14.63% stake in GEDI Gruppo Editoriale, making Exor a minority shareholder with a 4.26% stake.

Upon learning of Sergio Marchionne's irrevocable health conditions on 21 July 2018, Exor led efforts to replace him in all group companies in which he was involved: Mike Manley replaced him as CEO of FCA, Suzanne Heywood as chairwoman of CNH Industrial, and John Elkann as executive chairman of Ferrari, with Louis Camilleri assuming the role of Ferrari CEO. Upon his death on 25 July, Elkann expressed the eternal gratitude of the Agnelli family for his work in the Exor group.

In December 2019, the board of Compagnie Industriali Riunite (CIR) accepted Exor's offer to buy its 43.78% stake in GEDI Gruppo Editoriale. This operation restored the Agnelli family to majority ownership of La Stampa, which they had already controlled from 1926 to 2016, through FIAT (then FCA). Following a tender offer by Exor, GEDI is 100% controlled by Giano Holding Spa (a subsidiary of Exor), and was delisted on 11 August 2020. CIR and Carlo Perrone then acquired a 5% shareholding each in Giano Holding.

On 16 April 2020, Exor acquired an 8.87% stake in public mobility company Via Transportation for $200 million. In December 2020, Exor announced an €80 million investment in Chinese luxury brand Shang Xia, partnering with Hermès.

As announced in December 2019, FCA and PSA Group merged on 16 January 2021. In July 2020, Elkann and the FCA CEO Mike Manley announced that the combined company would be called Stellantis. The new company was listed on Borsa Italiana, Euronext Paris, and the New York Stock Exchange. At date of merger, the combined company became the world's fifth-largest car maker by unit sales. Exor supported the combination, with John Elkann and Andrea Agnelli joining the board on its behalf, and Elkann being nominated chairman and executive director of Stellantis. On 14 April 2021, Exor and Peugeot 1810 SAS (an investment company owned by the Peugeot family), the two largest shareholders in Stellantis, signed a five-year collaboration agreement.

=== Further investments (2021-2024) ===
Exor became a minority shareholder of the French fashion house Christian Louboutin in March 2021, purchasing 24% of the company for €541 million. On 16 June 2021, Exor and World-Wide Investments Company Limited of Hong Kong created the investment company NUO, which is 50% owned by Exor and 50% owned by WWICL.

On 1 January 2022, CNH Industrial executed a spin-off of its on-highway activities, creating Iveco Group N.V., the new holding company for Italian truck manufacturer Iveco, which was listed on Borsa Italiana. As a result, Exor became the leading shareholder of the new entity, with a 27% stake and 42% of voting rights.

In February 2022, Exor paid €845 million to Italian tax authorities to settle a dispute related to the "Exit Tax" it paid when moving its legal headquarters to the Netherlands in 2016.

As part of its already existing Exor Ventures program, in March 2022 Exor launched VENTO, a venture capital firm in Italy, to create "an Italy-focused seed initiative to support the country’s most promising entrepreneurs building the next generation of great companies".

On 24 May 2022, Exor announced that it had resolved to separate the roles of CEO and chairman, in order to appoint a non-executive independent chair. John Elkann will continue as CEO, while Ajay Banga (former CEO of Mastercard) was appointed chairman.

In June 2022, Exor acquired 45% shareholding in Lifenet S.r.l., an Italian company active in the healthcare sector, for €67 million. To increase its exposure in the healthcare sector, on 1 July 2022 Exor signed a deal to acquire 10% of Institut Mérieux for a value of €833 million, by way of a reserved capital increase. One third of the capital increase was effected immediately, with the remaining two thirds deferred to a later date.

On 12 July 2022, Exor finalised the sale of PartnerRe to Covéa for $9.3 billion, generating over $2.4 billion in capital gain.

To align its listing with its legal structure in the Netherlands, Exor announced in July 2022 that it would move its stock listing from Milan to Euronext Amsterdam. Exor shares began trading in Amsterdam on 12 August 2022, and were delisted from Borsa Italiana on 27 September 2022.

In May 2023, Exor launched Lingotto, an independent alternative investment manager, wholly owned by Exor and open to capital from other investors. The initial capital was around €2 billion, provided by Exor and Covéa. Former Exor CFO Enrico Vellano joined Lingotto as CEO, with George Osborne acting as its non-executive chairman.

On 2 May 2023, following his appointment as President of the World Bank, Ajay Banga resigned as chairman of Exor. Nitin Nohria was proposed as his replacement, and appointed on 31 May 2023.

In June 2023, Exor announced its partnership with Impala to form TagHolding, single shareholder of TagEnergy, a company operating in the renewables and energy storage sectors. On 14 August 2023, Exor acquired 15% of Philips, a multinational company in the health and technology sector, in an operation worth €2.6 billion. As part of an agreement signed with Philips, Exor may increase its shareholding to 20% and gains the right to appoint one member of the supervisory board.

As part of a €750 million accelerated buyback program conducted in the fall of 2023, Exor cancelled 5.6% of its ordinary shares in February 2024. As a result, Giovanni Agnelli BV (the successor entity to Giovanni Agnelli e C. S.a.p.az.) holds 56.9% of Exor's outstanding capital (55.6% of issued capital) and 86.0% of voting rights.

In March 2024, Exor increased its stake in UK-based Clarivate, a global provider of data, analytics, technology and expert services, to 10.1%. As part of the agreement, Exor can increase its stake up to 17.5% and Exor COO Suzanne Heywood will join Clarivate's board. Also in 2024, Exor, through NUO, acquired a 30% stake in Osit Impresa SpA, which owns Italian women's fashion brand Subdued.

=== Sale of Iveco (2025) ===
On July 30, 2025, Exor agreed to sell its entire controlling stake in Iveco as Tata Motors acquired the company for Iveco for €3.8 billion, including the controlling stake of 27.1% held by Exor, while Leonardo agreed to acquire Iveco Defence Vehicles for €1.7 billion.

=== The sale of the GEDI (2026) ===
On March 23, 2026, the sale of 100% of GEDI to the Greek group Antenna was completed. Financial analysts have highlighted a certain rush to close by the first quarter of 2026 and have also noted that it is more of a fire sale than a sale. Market estimates indicate a value for the sale of approximately €100 million. However, financial analysts estimated the group was worth at least four times that amount, approximately €400 million. The sale was prompted by Exor's need to raise capital for new investments, particularly in the technology sector or in other more profitable sectors.

== Financial data ==
The financial data for Exor S.p.A. (2009-2015) are the following:

Financial data for Exor (2009–2015)
Date	Net Asset Value	Gross Asset Value	Gross Debt	NAV per share
01/03/2009	€3.178 billion	€4.335 billion	-€1.157 billion	€12.95
31/12/2009	€5.947 billion	€7.078 billion	-€1.131 billion	€24.24
31/12/2010	€8.574 billion	€9.840 billion	-€1.266 billion	€34.95
31/12/2011	€6.530 billion	€7.672 billion	-€1.142 billion	€26.62
31/12/2012	€7.790 billion	€9.178 billion	-€1.388 billion	€31.75
31/12/2013	€9.022 billion	€10.313 billion	-€1.291 billion	€36.77
31/12/2014	€10.334 billion	€12.005 billion	-€1.671 billion	€42.12
31/12/2015	€12.267 billion	€14.965 billion	-€2.698 billion	€50.90

As of 12 February 2024, Exor classifies itself as an investment company, and has identified the following key financial metrics to quantify its performance:

Financial data for Exor (2016–2025)
Year	Net Asset Value	Gross Asset Value	Net Financial Position	Share of the profit from investments	Loan-to-Value Ratio	NAV per share
2016	€13.890 billion	€17.519 billion	-€3.424 billion	€0.885 billion	19.78%	€57.64
2017	€19.155 billion	€22.424 billion	-€3.164 billion	€1.448 billion	14.65%	€79.48
2018	€17.238 billion	€20.760 billion	-€3.255 billion	€1.438 billion	15.88%	€71.89
2019	€23.282 billion	€26.702 billion	-€2.631 billion	€3.033 billion	10.15%	€98.60
2020	€24.041 billion	€28.151 billion	-€3.251 billion	€0.079 billion	11.91%	€102.08
2021	€31.069 billion	€36.147 billion	-€3.924 billion	€3.088 billion	10.97%	€132.41
2022	€28.233 billion	€32.487 billion	+€0.795 billion	€1.914 billion	-	€122.34
2023	€35.513 billion	€39.819 billion	-€3.968 billion	€3.661 billion	10.10%	€162.36
2024	€38.212 billion	€42.460 billion	-€4.248 billion	-	9.6%	€178.80
2025	€33.241	€37.130 billion	-€3.889 billion	-	6,9%	€164,4

All data at 31 December, extrapolated from Exor's annual reports.

== Net Asset Value ==
At 31 December 2025, Exor had a Net Asset Value of €33.141 billion, broken down as follows:

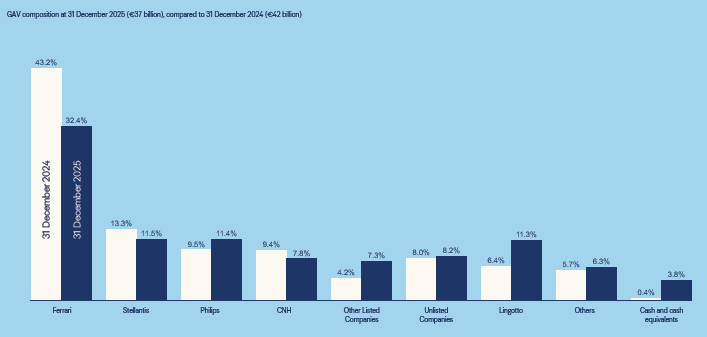
Exor's GAV breakdown at 31/12/2025

Breakdown of Exor's NAV at 31/12/2025 - € million
Companies	€29,172
Listed	€26,116
Unlisted	€3,056
Lingotto	€4,215
Others	€2,335
Funds managed by third parties	€932
Listed securities	€844
Unlisted securities	€259
Other assets	€300
GROSS ASSET VALUE (GAV)	€37,130
Gross debt	€3,708
Notes and bank debt	€3,663
Financial liabilities (Note: Financial liabilities corresponds mainly to the outstanding commitment in Institut Mérieux.)	€45
NET ASSET VALUE (NAV)	€33,241

== Companies ==
Exor's portfolio is principally composed by different companies in which Exor is the largest shareholder, which it either controls or exercises a significant influence in management. Their portfolio of companies is as follows:

=== Public companies ===
Company	Issued capital	Voting rights
Ferrari	19.5%	32.3%
Stellantis	15.5%	23.9%
CNH Industrial	26.9%	45.5%
Koninklijke Philips	19.0%	19.2%
Juventus Football Club	65.4%	78.1%
Clarivate	10.2%	10.2%

Note: Number of shares owned by Exor as last reported by Exor. Outstanding and issued shares as last reported by individual companies.

=== Private companies ===
Company	Issued capital	Voting rights
Institut Mérieux	10.0%	5.3%
Christian Louboutin	24.1%	24.1%
Via Transportation	17.4%	12.2%
The Economist Group	34.7%	20.0%
Welltec	47.6%	47.6%
TagEnergy	20.0%	18.6%
Lifenet	45.2%	45.9%
NUO	49.7%	50.0%
Shang Xia	100.0%	100.0%

Note: All private shareholdings at 21 April 2026, as reported in Exor's 2025 Annual Report.

== Exor Ventures ==
Exor's interest in new 21st-century companies led to the launch of Exor Ventures (formerly Exor Seeds), an early and late stage startup investment business, under the leadership of Noam Ohana since 2017. In September 2021, Exor appointed Diego Piacentini, former Amazon and Apple executive manager, as advisor of Exor and chairman of Exor Ventures.

Exor Ventures has invested $600 million in over 100 companies around the world with a focus on mobility, fintech, and healthcare sectors.

In 2024, Exor decided to discontinue its Ventures activities.

=== Vento ===
As part of its already existing Exor Ventures program, in March 2022 Exor launched VENTO, a venture capital firm in Italy guided by Diyala D'Aveni, to create "an Italy-focused seed initiative to support the country’s most promising entrepreneurs building the next generation of great companies". The firm, based in Turin, invests exclusively in Italian startups.

As of 23 April 2024, VENTO's portfolio includes the following companies:

- AcousticaBio
- anthropos
- Apto
- Arca Dynamics
- BIZAWAY
- BonusX
- BRIDGE
- Bugpilot
- cariqa
- cassandra
- CRANE BIOSCIENCES
- DBSPACE
- desia
- deckx
- Dorian Therapeutics
- DSCOVR
- EOLIANN
- Ephos
- eSteps
- Leasy
- flami
- Futura
- HALE
- Hivebound
- Holifya
- Ilios Tx
- IMPSSBL
- Jet HR
- JustSolve
- KATAKEM
- LEXROOM.AI
- LIQI
- MicroSignals
- MIRTA
- moligo technologies
- Nebuly
- NOVA
- Otter
- PART
- Planckian
- plino
- qomodo
- RANGE biotechnologies
- RELLAI
- Renaissance Fusion
- SAEKI
- samaya
- serenis
- Sibill
- SylloTips
- sinaptik
- STORYKUBE
- Superlayer
- theta
- text yess
- ToffeeX
- Unakin
- VIAVIA
- Wayfinder Biosciences
- zefi

== Key people ==
=== Board of Directors ===
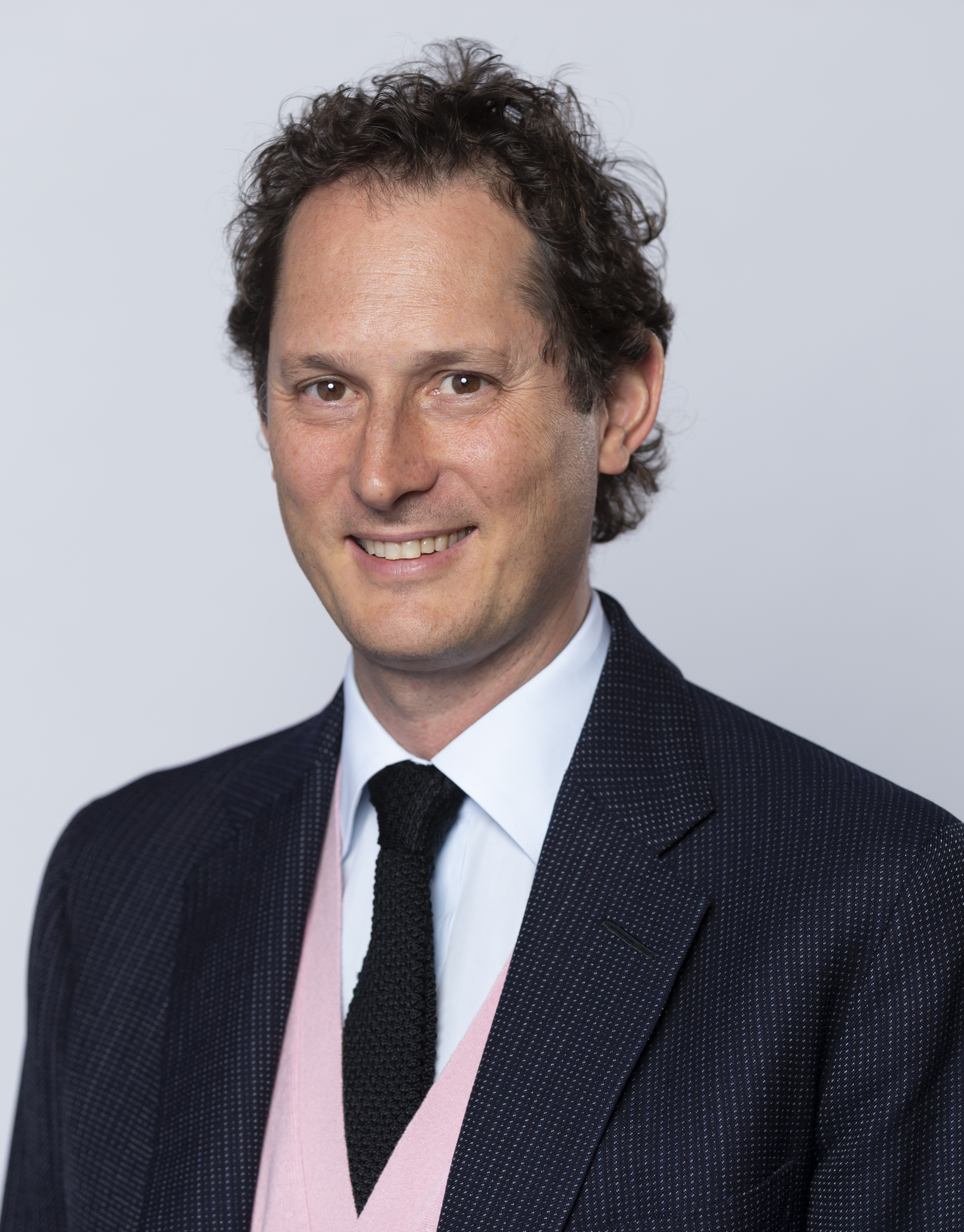
John Elkann, CEO of Exor

As of 20 May 2026, the board of directors in charge of Exor was as follows:

- Nitin Nohria – Chairman
- John Elkann – Chief Executive Officer
- Benedetto Della Chiesa - Non-Executive Director
- Sandra Dembeck – Non-Executive Director
- Axel Dumas – Non-Executive Director
- Ginevra Elkann – Non-Executive Director
- Karl Guha – Non-Executive Director
- Alessandro Nasi – Non-Executive Director
- Png Chin Yee – Non-Executive Director

John Elkann, Ginevra Elkann, Alessandro Nasi and Tiberto Ruy Brandolini D'Adda are members of the Agnelli family and representatives of Giovanni Agnelli BV, the company's controlling shareholder.

=== Executive Team ===
The company's executive team, as of 20 May 2026, is the following:

- John Elkann – Chief Executive Officer (CEO)
- Suzanne Heywood - Chief Operating Officer (COO)
- Guido de Boer - Chief Financial Officer (CFO)
- Benoît Ribadeau-Dumas - Chief Companies Officer

== Major shareholders ==
Shareholder	Shared Capital
Giovanni Agnelli B.V.	55.07%
Baillie Gifford	4.92%
Harris Associates	4.09%
Vanguard Group	3.59%
Own share	3.28%
Other Shareholders	29,05%

In addition, Giovanni Agnelli BV holds 86.0% of voting rights, due to the company's loyalty voting structure.

== See also ==
- List of the largest family businesses
- Agnelli family
- John Elkann
- Gianni Agnelli
- Giovanni Agnelli (entrepreneur, born 1866)
