= List of the largest family businesses =

The following list contains the world's 50 largest family businesses by revenue. All data comes from the Family Business Index 500 report by the British auditing firm Ernst & Young and the University of St. Gallen, which lists the 500 largest family businesses in the world. All 500 companies on the list had a combined turnover of $7.3 trillion in 2020. Companies that have not published financial statements in the last 24 months are not included in the ranking. In 2020, U.S. retailer Walmart was the largest family business company in the world, with sales of more than $500 billion.

== Top 50 ==
The ranking only lists companies that are managed by the same family in at least the second generation. To qualify as a family business, family members must continue to be involved in the management of the company, either on the board of directors, in the executive management or on the supervisory board. In addition, the family must hold at least 50 percent of the shares or voting rights in private companies and at least 32 percent of the shares in public companies.

Rank	Company	Country	Revenue in bn. US$ (2020)	Family (shareholding)
1	Walmart	United States	559.1	Walton family (48.9%)
2	Berkshire Hathaway	United States	245.5	Buffett family (37.2%)
3	Exor	Netherlands	145.3	Elkann family and Agnelli family (53.0%)
4	Schwarz Group	Germany	140.0	Schwarz family (100%)
5	Ford Motor Company	United States	127.1	Ford family (40.0%)
6	BMW	Germany	122.2	Quandt family (46.8%)
7	Koch Industries	United States	115.0	Koch family (84.0%)
8	Cargill	United States	114.6	Cargill-Macmillan family (85.0%)
9	Comcast	United States	103.6	Roberts family (33.8%)
10	Dell Technologies	United States	94.2	Dell family (75.0%)
11	Robert Bosch GmbH	Germany	87.0	Bosch family (100%)
12	Reliance Industries	India	79.5	Ambani family (44.3%)
13	SK Group	South Korea	73.9	Chey family (32.7%)
14	Country Garden	China	71.1	Yang Guoqiang family (59.3%)
15	Schaeffler Group	Germany	70.5	Schaeffler family (100%)
16	Roche Holding	Switzerland	68.5	Hoffman and Oeri families (50.1%)
17	LG Corporation	South Korea	58.1	Koo family (33.7%)
18	LVMH	France	54.8	Arnault family (47.5%)
19	George Weston Limited	Canada	54.7	Weston family (53.2%)
20	Aditya Birla Group	India	53.5	Birla family (100%)
21	ArcelorMittal	Luxembourg	53.3	Mittal family (35.6%)
22	JBS S. A.	Brazil	52.2	Batista family (35.8%)
23	América Móvil	Mexico	51.0	Slim family (52.9%)
24	Gunvor	Switzerland	50.0	Törnqvist family (100%)
25	Anheuser-Busch InBev	Belgium	49.7	Sicupira, Telles und Lemann families (33.6%)
26	Hanwha Group	South Korea	46.8	Kim family (38.1%)
27	Midea Group	China	43.5	He family (32.0%)
28	Tyson Foods	United States	43.2	Tyson family (70.6%)
29	Idemitsu Kōsan	Japan	42.0	Idemitsu family (37.6%)
30	Groupe Casino	France	41.8	Naouri family (56.5%)
31	A. P. Møller-Mærsk	Denmark	40.0	Mærsk Mc-Kinney Uggla family (70.6%)
32	Power Corporation of Canada	Canada	39.5	Desmarais family (50.6%)
33	Auchan	France	38.9	Mulliez family (95.0%)
34	Nike	United States	37.4	Knight family (84.2%)
35	Mars Incorporated	United States	37.0	Mars family (100%)
36	Aldi	Germany	35.6	Albrecht family (100%)
37	Reyes Holdings	United States	35.0	Reyes family (100%)
38	Tata Motors	India	34.9	Tata family (46.4%)
39	Porsche	Germany	34.6	Porsche-Piëch family (58.3%)
40	CK Hutchison Holdings	Hong Kong	34.4	Li family (56.2%)
41	L’Oréal	France	33.6	Bettencourt-Meyers family (33.2%)
42	Louis Dreyfus Company	Netherlands	33.6	Louis-Dreyfus family (96.0%)
43	Phoenix Pharmahandel	Germany	33.0	Merckle family (100%)
44	Penske Corporation	United States	32.0	Penske family (60.0%)
45	CMA CGM	France	31.5	Saadé family (74.1%)
46	H-E-B Grocery	United States	31.2	Butt family (100%)
47	Mercadona	Spain	29.8	Roig family (100%)
48	Bolloré	France	29.7	Bolloré family (75.4%)
49	Pilot Flying J	United States	29.5	Haslam family (50.1%)
50	CJ Group	South Korea	29.4	Lee family (44.8%)
