= Batman v Superman: Dawn of Justice =

2016 superhero film by Zack Snyder

- Theatrical release poster
- Directed by: Zack Snyder
- Written by: Chris Terrio; David S. Goyer
- Based on: Characters from DC Comics
- Produced by: Charles Roven; Deborah Snyder
- Starring: Ben Affleck; Henry Cavill; Amy Adams; Jesse Eisenberg; Diane Lane; Laurence Fishburne; Jeremy Irons; Holly Hunter; Gal Gadot
- Cinematography: Larry Fong
- Edited by: David Brenner
- Music by: Hans Zimmer; Junkie XL
- Production companies: Warner Bros. Pictures; RatPac Entertainment; DC Entertainment; Atlas Entertainment; Cruel and Unusual Films
- Distributed by: Warner Bros. Pictures
- Release dates: March 19, 2016 (Auditorio Nacional); March 25, 2016 (United States)
- Running time: 151 minutes
- Country: United States
- Language: English
- Budget: $250–325 million
- Box office: $874.4 million

Batman v Superman: Dawn of Justice is a 2016 American superhero film based on the DC Comics characters Batman and Superman. Directed by Zack Snyder and written by Chris Terrio and David S. Goyer, it is a follow-up to Man of Steel (2013) and the second film in the DC Extended Universe (DCEU). The film stars Ben Affleck as Batman and Henry Cavill as Superman, alongside a cast including Amy Adams, Jesse Eisenberg, Diane Lane, Laurence Fishburne, Jeremy Irons, Holly Hunter, and Gal Gadot. Batman v Superman: Dawn of Justice is the first live-action film to feature Batman and Superman together, as well as the first live-action cinematic portrayal of Wonder Woman. In the film, criminal mastermind Lex Luthor manipulates Batman into a preemptive battle with Superman, whom Luthor is obsessed with destroying.

The film was announced at the 2013 San Diego Comic-Con after the release of Man of Steel. Snyder stated that the film would take inspiration from the Batman comic book series The Dark Knight Returns by Frank Miller, but clarified that it would follow an original premise. The incarnation of Batman in the film is different from the character's previous portrayal by Christian Bale in The Dark Knight trilogy, serving as a cinematic reboot of the character. The film is also inspired by narrative elements from the Superman comic book series The Death of Superman. Pre-production began at East Los Angeles College in October 2013, and principal photography started in May 2014 in Detroit. Additional filming also took place in Illinois and New Mexico, concluding in December.

Batman v Superman: Dawn of Justice premiered at the Auditorio Nacional in Mexico City on March 19, 2016, and was released in the United States on March 25, by Warner Bros. Pictures. It grossed $874 million worldwide against a budget of $250–325 million, becoming the seventh-highest-grossing film of 2016, while also having the biggest opening weekend for a superhero film at the time of its release. It received mixed reviews from critics. A director's cut, dubbed the "Ultimate Edition", features 31 minutes of additional footage and was released to home media formats later in 2016. A follow-up, titled Justice League, was released on November 17, 2017.

== Plot ==
In a flashback to his childhood, Bruce Wayne flees his parents' funeral. He falls into a cave, where a circling vortex of bats elevates him back to the surface. In the present, eighteen months after his cataclysmic battle with General Zod in Metropolis, (Note: As depicted in Man of Steel (2013)) Superman has become a controversial figure. Bruce is now a billionaire who has operated in Gotham City as the masked vigilante Batman for twenty years. Having witnessed the battle in person, he sees Superman as an existential threat to humanity.

Clark Kent, Superman's civilian identity, seeks to condemn Batman's brutal methods in Daily Planet articles. LexCorp mogul Lex Luthor attempts to persuade US Senator June Finch to allow him to import kryptonite discovered in the aftermath of Zod's terraforming attempt, so that it can be used as a deterrent against future Kryptonian threats. She declines, but Luthor makes alternative plans with Finch's subordinate, who grants him access to Zod's corpse and the Kryptonian scout ship. (Note: As seen first in Man of Steel (2013))

Bruce attends a gala at LexCorp to steal the company's encrypted data, but antiquities dealer Diana Prince steals it first; she returns it to Bruce. Bruce dreams of a post-apocalyptic world where he leads rebels against an evil Superman. He is awakened by an unidentified person, appearing through a portal, who tells him that Lois Lane is "the key" and urges him to find "the others" before vanishing. (Note: Although the character is never explicitly identified in the theatrical film, producer Deborah Snyder confirmed that he is the Flash traveling back in time, played by Ezra Miller, later credited as the Flash in the Ultimate Edition.) The decrypted data reveals Luthor's files on several metahumans across the globe. One is Diana, who appears in a photo from World War I.

A widely publicized congressional hearing at the US Capitol, led by Finch, is held to question Superman's actions and intentions. A lead-covered bomb smuggled in by Luthor detonates, killing everyone present. Superman blames himself for not detecting it and self-imposes exile. Believing Superman was complicit in the attack, Batman breaks into LexCorp and steals the kryptonite to weaponize it. Wearing an armored exosuit and wielding a kryptonite spear, he lights the Bat-Signal and awaits a battle with Superman.

Luthor lures Superman out by kidnapping Martha Kent, Clark's adoptive mother, and Lois. Superman saves Lois and confronts Luthor, who reveals he orchestrated Batman's paranoia. He demands that Superman kill Batman in exchange for Martha's life. Superman arrives in Gotham and tries reasoning with Batman, who attacks him using kryptonite-laced gas. They battle, but Batman proves victorious. As Batman prepares to kill him with the spear, Superman pleads with him to "save Martha" – the same name as Batman's mother. Batman hesitates as Lois arrives and explains Superman's pleading. Realizing he has been manipulated, and recognizing Superman's humanity, Batman rescues Martha.

Luthor, desperate to kill Superman, executes his backup plan: unleashing a monster genetically engineered using DNA from both Zod's body and his own. (Note: While never identified on-screen or in the credits, beyond Luthor telling Superman the creature is "your doomsday", actor Robin Atkin Downes has identified the character as Doomsday.) A sword-wielding Diana joins Batman and Superman in their fight against the creature. Batman realizes its vulnerability to kryptonite. A weakened Superman fatally impales the creature with the kryptonite spear, but it deals him a deadly blow in return. Superman passes away in Lois's arms.

Following Luthor's arrest, Batman confronts him in prison, where Luthor gloats that Superman's death has made the world vulnerable to an alien threat. A memorial is held for Superman in Metropolis, while Bruce and Diana attend a funeral for Clark, also declared dead. Bruce tells Diana that he regrets failing Superman and asks for her help in forming a team of metahumans to protect Earth in Superman's absence. As they leave, the dirt atop Clark's coffin levitates.

== Cast ==
- Ben Affleck as Bruce Wayne / Batman:
  A billionaire socialite and owner of Wayne Enterprises who dedicates himself to protecting Gotham City from its criminal underworld as a highly trained, masked vigilante. The Batsuit in this film is made of a form-fitting fabric as opposed to the armored suits in previous portrayals, and a mechanical suit is also featured which Batman uses in his fight against Superman. On Batman's suit, Zack Snyder commented, "I had a really strong idea about what I wanted to do – I really wanted to do sort of a fabric-based Batman; not what's become the more normal, armored Batman. That's how we evolved it." Unlike previous versions who spoke in a deeper voice as Batman, this version uses a voice modulator to distort his real voice. Affleck stated a well-known billionaire would likely have his voice recognized. When asked what makes this Batman different from the previous portrayals, Affleck said this Batman "is a little older, he's a little more world-weary. He's been around the block once or twice so he's a little wiser but he's definitely more cynical and a little darker and more jaded", adding that Batman has gotten "more exposed to the violence and the criminal element of that world over time." The film's Batman was influenced by Frank Miller's The Dark Knight Returns, which shows Batman in his 50s. Snyder said, "I definitely wanted an older Batman. I wanted a war-weary Batman. That's why, in a lot of ways, Ben was really perfect for me – we kind of aged him a little bit. It worked really great. I'm really excited about the Batman we created." On Affleck's casting as Batman, Snyder said, "Ben provides an interesting counterbalance to Henry's Superman. He has the acting chops to create a layered portrayal of a man who is older and wiser than Clark Kent and bears the scars of a seasoned crime fighter, but retain the charm that the world sees in billionaire Bruce Wayne." Affleck praised Snyder for tackling the impact of the destruction caused in Metropolis in the previous installment, saying, "One of the things I liked was Zack's idea of showing accountability and the consequences of violence and seeing that there are real people in those buildings", adding, "And in fact, one of those buildings was Bruce Wayne's building so he knew people who died in that Black Zero event". Brandon Spink portrays a young Bruce Wayne.
- Henry Cavill as Clark Kent / Superman:
  A Metropolis-based Kryptonian survivor and a journalist for the Daily Planet who uses his extraterrestrial abilities to protect humanity. Superman's suit in Batman v Superman is somewhat similar to that in Man of Steel, but with enhanced, high-tech-style surface detail and a shinier, more metallic-looking cape. A quote written in Kryptonian was added into Superman's symbol which says "Where we had thought to stand alone, we will be with all the world". The film addresses the destruction caused by Superman and Zod in Metropolis, a part of Man of Steel that was criticized for being too extensive for Superman, to which Snyder responded "I was surprised because that's the thesis of Superman for me, that you can't just have superheroes knock around and have there be no consequences". On what the public perception of Superman is in the film, Cavill said "In this movie, everyone has split into different directions as to how they feel about this alien", adding, "Some people love him, some hate him. Other people fear him. Is he a tyrant?" When asked how Superman has evolved since Man of Steel, Cavill said "Superman himself isn't that different. He does, however, have to deal with a new set of problems because he's now been revealed to the world. This film is more about how the world in general – and Batman in particular – sees this alien, and less about the evolution of Superman." Cavill described Superman and Batman as being the "two sides of the same coin. They have the same goal, but use very different methods to achieve it. Understandably, that leads them to clash with one another, and their conflict is a historic moment."
- Amy Adams as Lois Lane:
  A reporter for the Daily Planet and love interest of Clark Kent. About her role, Adams stated that "Lois is still sort of like the key to the information. She's the girl going out and getting it and figuring it out and putting it together and all of that, so she's very much involved." When asked about her thoughts on portraying Lois Lane in the film, Adams replied, "I love that she's fearless. I'm not that way so it's really fun that she really is not afraid of the consequences." On Lois Lane and Clark Kent's relationship in the film, Adams said, "What's great about this is that, as far as the relationship with Lois and Clark goes, when we meet them you can tell that they've been in a relationship for while," further explaining, "So it was great to get to develop that sort of intimacy and that sort of friendship that I've developed with Henry, to get to bring that to the screen." She also described Clark Kent as being Lois Lane's connection to humanity and said, "She may have some tunnel vision, but she's got a job and moral standards. [When] we met her before, she would do anything to get the story – now Clark has instilled some faith in humanity in her. Her relationship with Clark is the closest thing she has to anything faith-based, you know? Although moving in with Clark brings issues."
- Jesse Eisenberg as Lex Luthor:
  An eccentric young businessman and hereditary CEO of LexCorp who is obsessed with defeating Superman. Luthor is usually depicted as bald in the comics while the film's version of Luthor depicts him with hair throughout the majority of the film. When speaking about his portrayal of Luthor compared to previous portrayals, Eisenberg said, "When you're doing a movie like this and playing a character that's already been played, the further away it is from those previous incarnations the better", adding, "Because chances are, especially with a guy like Gene Hackman or Kevin Spacey, you're not going to get favorably compared." Eisenberg explained his character's background as having "a core of reality", saying, "[Luthor] has a backstory that's tragic and an emotional inner life that's authentic. That's in the movie. It was my interest in playing the character with a real emotional core, and this writer, Chris Terrio's interest in creating a character that seemed viable in reality." On Luthor's behavior and attitude towards Superman, Eisenberg said, "He is a narcissist of the first order but complicated in that way as well in that he is terribly troubled and competitive and vengeful. He looks at Superman not as somebody to destroy but as genuine threat to humanity." Eisenberg described his role as Lex Luthor as his most advantageous role yet, saying, "In a lot of ways Luthor is more of a stretch than any character you would do in an independent movie, which is normally the place you stretch. So in that way it was not at all compromised. If anything it was the best, most advantageous role I've ever been given. The opportunity to do an interesting character on a movie of that scale is incredibly rare." Eisenberg describes a theme in the film, saying, "It raises the question of how one man can have so much power. These are the kind of things that we talk about authoritarian states. They're addressing geopolitics in this movie and not in a way that's pretentious or esoteric".
- Diane Lane as Martha Kent:
  Clark's adoptive mother. On her role as Superman's mother, Lane stated, "I always said if I had a son that would be the ultimate test. Raise a good man — there's something noble about that." When asked on her experience working with Zack Snyder on Batman v Superman, Lane said she was impressed by Snyder's imagination and added, "Who gets offered the opportunity to bring such things to the screen for millions of people? That's tremendous. It's an honor and a burden, and I can't imagine shouldering that load." On Martha Kent's support for her son Superman, Lane stated, "I think that she's reminding him he does have a choice", further explaining, "He doesn't have to be yoked to this destiny. He can actually feel the pleasure of making the choice."
- Laurence Fishburne as Perry White:
  The editor-in-chief of the Daily Planet and Clark and Lois' boss. When asked about reprising his role in the film, Fishburne said, "I was happy to come back to the character. I got really excited when I read it and I saw what was at the center at the movie, which was this huge fight between these two titans." On Perry White's role in the film, Fishburne said, "He's dealing with the fact that his medium looks like it's going the way of the dinosaurs, so that's a difficult position to be in", adding, the "good news is he's got a great reporter like Lois Lane and a new great reporter like Clark Kent who are interested and hungry to do the job." Describing Perry White's working relationship with Lois Lane, Fishburne stated, "She's my favorite child and she's my problem child." On his experience filming and his character's interactions, Fishburne said, "It was really just a couple of days in the beginning with Lois, Clark, and Perry. And the rest was just me with Lois, figuring out how to get her where she needed to go. But the relationships I think were established really well in Man of Steel."
- Jeremy Irons as Alfred Pennyworth:
  Bruce Wayne's butler, chief of security and trusted confidant. Irons described his take on Alfred Pennyworth as being "quite a different Alfred than we have seen so far. Zack Snyder had very clear views about what he wanted. I would just say he's more hands-on perhaps than just a butler." When asked what makes his Alfred different from previous portrayals, Irons said, "Zack Snyder, the director, wanted to create a completely different Alfred. So I felt I didn't have to carry any baggage from previous ones. It's sort of a reincarnation, if you'd like. I had a feeling I was creating my own Alfred, more of a man who can actually do anything if he has to." According to Irons, Alfred is "a bit of a grease monkey, and he's very involved in the decisions Bruce makes." On how Alfred would be in the film, Irons stated, "He has an interesting history. He's a very competent man. He's the sort of man I think anyone would like to be married to. He can sort of do everything: change light bulbs, blow up bridges if he has to."
- Holly Hunter as June Finch:
  United States Senator from Kentucky who heads the political argument on Superman and his actions. Describing her experience on being in the film, Hunter said, "It was really fun to be part of a giant, massive piece of machinery, headed up by Zack Snyder, who is thoroughly at home in that uber mega environment. Most people would have a nervous breakdown with that kind of pressure, and he's enthralled." When asked how she got involved in the film, Hunter said, "Zack asked me. He came to me with an offer, and I was like, 'Yeah, that would be fun.' It's fun to mix it up. I have scenes with Superman. He looks phenomenal. And to see Ben [Affleck, who plays Batman] and Henry [Cavill, who plays Superman] together is quite formidable." On acting in a superhero film, Hunter stated, "Being somebody who's like a theater geek that I am, I can just go right back to Aeschylus and Euripides and Sophocles. They were writing about gods and goddesses versus humans, and how gods could distort, pervert or help people get what they want. And so, for me, this didn't feel foreign because that was the translation that it went through for me; that was my filter." On her character's views on Superman, Hunter stated, "What is her problem with Superman? That absolute power corrupts absolutely. When power is acting autonomously, unilaterally with no legislation, with no boundaries, with no law, except for the ones that he deems in his own mind, that can be detrimental." Describing her character, Hunter said, "I thought that, you know, as a senator, she brought her female-ness to the job in how she listened, in her curiosity, in her ability to evaluate", adding, "[It] felt very female to me."
- Gal Gadot as Diana Prince / Wonder Woman:
  An immortal Amazonian warrior who is the crown princess of Themyscira. Wonder Woman's suit is made out of chrome-painted polyurethane, and she uses her hand wraps and sword harnesses. Gadot described her character as having "many strengths and powers, but at the end of the day, she's a woman with a lot of emotional intelligence". Describing Wonder Woman's compassion, Gadot stated, "It's all her heart—that's her strength. I think women are amazing for being able to show what they feel. I admire women who do." On her thoughts on portraying Wonder Woman, Gadot said, "You know Wonder Woman; she's amazing. I love everything that she represents and everything that she stands for. She's all about love and compassion and truth and justice and equality, and she's a whole lot of woman. For me, it was important that people can relate to her." Describing her role in the film, Gadot said, "In this movie you get a glimpse of who Wonder Woman is — she's being introduced into this DC Comics universe. But we were talking about her strengths, her façade, her attitude. Why is she acting the way she is?" On Wonder Woman's battle scene with Doomsday, Gadot stated, "I remember after we did that take, Zack came to me and he said, 'Did you just have a smirk?' I said, 'Yeah.' And he asked, 'Why? I think I like it, but why?' 'Well, if he's gonna mess with her, then she's gonna mess with him. And she knows she's gonna win.' At the end of the day, Wonder Woman is a peace seeker. But when fight arrives, she can fight. She's a warrior and she enjoys the adrenaline of the fight." Gadot also stated "I don't want people to think she is perfect", further explaining, "She can be naughty." On Gadot's casting as Wonder Woman, Snyder said "Wonder Woman is arguably one of the most powerful female characters of all time and a fan favorite in the DC Universe. Not only is Gal an amazing actress, but she also has that magical quality that makes her perfect for the role." Gadot underwent a diet and training regimen, practiced different martial arts and gained 17 pounds (7.7 kg) of muscle for the role. Gadot was previously offered the role as Faora Hu-Ul in Man of Steel but declined because she was pregnant at that time; this allowed her to be later cast as Wonder Woman.
- Scoot McNairy as Wallace Keefe:
  An amputee employee of Wayne Enterprises who is crippled during the destruction of Metropolis and holds Superman responsible. McNairy describes his character as a type of character who he has never played before and stated "getting into that thing was definitely something I had to wrap my head around emotionally in order to play that character." When asked if the character was being kept as a surprise until the film's release, McNairy said "I don't know if I'd call it necessarily a surprise. I would say it's a character that lends itself to the story being told." On his thoughts on being in the film, McNairy stated "Playing in that world with comic books you've been reading since you were a kid, being someone in that world, it's awesome."
- Callan Mulvey as Anatoli Knyazev:
  A Russian terrorist who works for Luthor. On casting Mulvey in the film, Zack Snyder stated, "I just had the good fortune to work with Callan on 300: Rise of an Empire and was very impressed with his incredible talent," further adding, "He's a fantastic actor and I'm looking forward to having the chance to work with him again." On working with Snyder again, Mulvey stated "Zack is such a visionary, so I know it's going to be an amazing project. Talent as a director aside, people really love working for Zack and being on his sets, which says it all really."
- Tao Okamoto as Mercy Graves:
  Assistant to Luthor. On her role in the film, Okamoto said "It was so fascinating. I didn't have a big speaking role. I used to act as sassy girls all the time as a model so that wasn't so challenging to me. But I enjoyed it so much, being mean. I tried to be mean." On Okamoto's casting, Snyder said "Tao is a striking presence whose beauty is aptly rivaled by her amazing abilities as an actress. I'm really excited to have her joining us on this adventure."

Robin Atkin Downes performed the motion capture and voice work for the creature at the film's climax. Although the character is not named directly, it was revealed later to be that of Doomsday. The role was kept under such heavy secrecy that Downes did not know who he was playing until the second trailer was released. On his role, Downes stated that he was proud to be part of the film and expressed his admiration in helping bring Doomsday to life in Batman v Superman: Dawn of Justice. Snyder has confirmed Doomsday will return in the DCEU, stating "Well, you have Doomsday, right? He doesn't just crawl out of the ground. He has his own mythology, right? So that has to be explored." Downes has previously provided voice roles for various DC animated films and shows as well as DC video games.

Additionally, Jeffrey Dean Morgan portrays Thomas Wayne in an uncredited appearance and Lauren Cohan portrays Martha Wayne, Bruce Wayne's deceased parents, Patrick Wilson (who later portrayed Ocean Master in Aquaman and its sequel) portrays the President of the United States in a voice role, and Michael Cassidy portrays Jimmy Olsen, a CIA agent. Reprising their roles from Man of Steel are Harry Lennix as Secretary Calvin Swanwick, Christina Wren as Major Carrie Farris, Kevin Costner as Jonathan Kent, Rebecca Buller as Jenny Jurwich, Chad Krowchuk as Glen Woodburn, and Carla Gugino as the Kryptonian AI Kelor. The corpse of General Zod also appears in the film in a crucial role; however, Michael Shannon did not film any scenes for the film and the corpse was created using the physique of fitness model Greg Plitt and a head-shot of Shannon. Hugh Maguire portrays Jack O'Dwyer, an executive of Wayne Enterprises.

Ezra Miller, Jason Momoa, and Ray Fisher are introduced as Barry Allen / The Flash, Arthur Curry / Aquaman, and Victor Stone / Cyborg respectively in brief appearances, which led to their inclusion in the Justice League film. Joe Morton appears in a role as Silas Stone, Victor's father. U.S. Senator Patrick Leahy makes a cameo appearance as Senator Purrington, whilst U.S. Senator Debbie Stabenow also makes a cameo as the Governor of New Jersey. Neil deGrasse Tyson, Soledad O'Brien, Anderson Cooper, Nancy Grace, Charlie Rose, Dana Bash, Andrew Sullivan, and Vikram Gandhi appear as themselves. Sammi Rotibi was cast as General Amajagh, while Wunmi Mosaku portrays Kahina Ziri, a woman from Nairomi who initially testifies to the U.S. Congress against Superman. Jena Malone was cast as S.T.A.R. Labs scientist Jenet Klyburn, but her scenes were cut from the theatrical release, along with Man of Steel characters Coburn Goss as Father Leone, Joseph Cranford as Pete Ross and Emily Peterson as Lana Lang; they were restored for the Ultimate Edition home media release. Talk show host Jon Stewart has a cameo in the extended cut. To further establish the interconnection between the films of the shared universe, Chris Pine, Saïd Taghmaoui, Ewen Bremner, and Eugene Brave Rock appear in Diana Prince's photo as Steve Trevor, Sameer, Charlie, and Chief Napi, all characters who would appear in the Wonder Woman film.

== Production ==
=== Development ===
In August 2001, Andrew Kevin Walker was hired by Warner Bros. after pitching the studio an idea titled Batman vs. Superman, attaching Wolfgang Petersen as director. Walker's draft was thought of as too dark by the studio, who hired Akiva Goldsman to do a rewrite, which was codenamed Asylum. Warner Bros. wanted Johnny Depp as Batman and Josh Hartnett as Superman, but Colin Farrell and Jude Law were later "cast" in the roles. Filming was to start in early 2003, with plans for a five- to six-month shoot and a release date was set for the summer of 2004. In late 2002, Petersen, however, put the project on hold to make Troy, and Warner Bros. quickly developed Catwoman, starring Halle Berry, as a replacement for the project. In August 2008, the studio's President of Production Jeff Robinov admitted, "Had Superman worked in 2006 (i.e. with Superman Returns), we would have had a movie for Christmas of this year or 2009. Now the plan is just to reintroduce Superman without regard to a Batman and Superman movie at all."

"... after Man of Steel finished and we started talking about what would be in the next movie, I started subtly mentioning that it would be cool if he faced Batman... You're in a story meeting talking about, like, who should [Superman] fight if he fought this giant alien threat Zod who was basically his equal physically, from his planet, fighting on our turf... You know, who to fight next?... But I'm not gonna say at all that when I took the job to do Man of Steel that I did it in a subversive way to get to Batman. I really believe that only after contemplating who could face [Superman] did Batman come into the picture."

— Snyder, on how Batman came into the film

In June 2013, around the time of Man of Steel's release, the studio announced that director Zack Snyder and screenwriter David S. Goyer would return for a sequel, with the studio considering a 2015 release. The following month, Snyder confirmed at San Diego Comic-Con that the follow-up to Man of Steel would be Batman vs. Superman featuring Superman and Batman meeting for the first time on film. Goyer and Snyder would co-write the story, and Goyer would write the script. Christopher Nolan was involved in an advisory role as executive producer. Snyder and Nolan considered having Man of Steel share continuity with Nolan's The Dark Knight trilogy, but ultimately decided against it. Given The Dark Knight Rises (2012) ended with John Blake (played by Joseph Gordon Levitt) taking over as Batman for Bruce Wayne (Christian Bale), Snyder agreed that a connection between the two franchises could have "complicated things" for Batman vs. Superman as audiences would commonly expect to see Bruce Wayne slug it out with Superman. According to Snyder, the film would take inspiration from the comic The Dark Knight Returns.

In November 2013, Snyder clarified his film would not be based upon the aforementioned graphic novel. "If you were going to do that, you would need a different Superman. We're bringing Batman into the universe that now this Superman lives in." The film also marks the first appearance of Wonder Woman in a live-action, theatrical feature, which Warner Bros. had been developing as far back as 1996. In December 2013, Chris Terrio was hired to rewrite the script, due to Goyer's commitments to other projects. Further commenting on the influences, Terrio revealed that the film would draw inspiration from Nolan's Batman trilogy, Italian semiotician Umberto Eco's 1972 essay "The Myth of Superman", and the W.H. Auden poem "Musée des Beaux Arts" which contrasts the quotidian details of normal people's lives with the epic struggles of mythological figures. According to him, "In superhero stories, Batman is Pluto, god of the underworld, and Superman is Apollo, god of the sky. That began to be really interesting to me — that their conflict is not just due to manipulation, but their very existence." The Joker and the Riddler were supposed to appear in the film, but Snyder ultimately decided to cut them from the final script.

The film's official title, Batman v Superman: Dawn of Justice, was revealed in May 2014. Snyder explained that having the "v" in the title instead of "vs." was a way "to keep it from being a straight 'versus' movie, even in the most subtle way". Henry Cavill later stated, "I wouldn't call this a Superman sequel [...] This is Batman versus Superman. It's a separate entity altogether. It's introducing the Batman character and expanding upon the universe, which was kicked off by Man of Steel." Forbes noted that although the film originated as a sequel to Man of Steel, it was "revamped into a backdoor pilot for Justice League and/or an eventual stand-alone Batman movie." As part of a settlement with his heirs, this is the first Batman production that lists Bill Finger as a co-creator. In April 2021, Terrio revealed that his script was never titled Batman v Superman: Dawn of Justice, while Snyder indicated that the name of the film was decided by studio executives and that he fought for the abbreviation of the word "versus" in the title. Potential titles that the pair initially wanted included Justice League: Foundations, Justice League: Rising, and Son of Sun and Knight of Night.

=== Casting ===
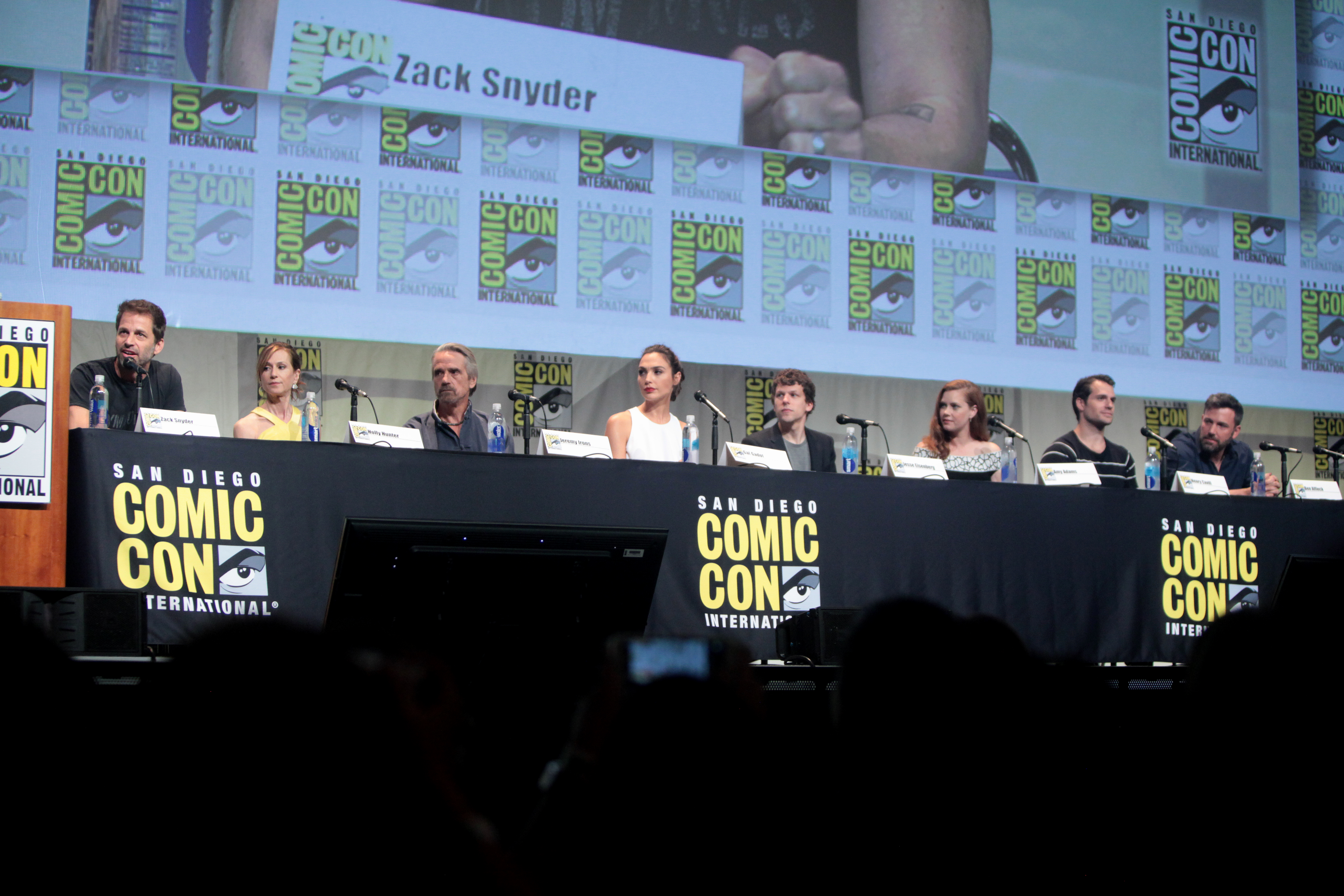
From left: Zack Snyder (director), Holly Hunter, Jeremy Irons, Gal Gadot, Jesse Eisenberg, Amy Adams, Henry Cavill and Ben Affleck at the 2015 San Diego Comic-Con

Henry Cavill, Amy Adams, Kevin Costner, Diane Lane, Laurence Fishburne, Harry Lennix and Christina Wren reprise their roles from Man of Steel. Joining the cast are Ben Affleck as Batman, Gal Gadot as Wonder Woman, Jesse Eisenberg as Lex Luthor, Jeremy Irons as Alfred Pennyworth, Ray Fisher as Cyborg, Jason Momoa as Aquaman, Ezra Miller as The Flash and Tao Okamoto as Luthor's assistant Mercy Graves. Scoot McNairy and Callan Mulvey were cast as Wallace Keefe and Anatoli Knyazev, while Jena Malone was cast as Jenet Klyburn, a character that was featured exclusively in the Ultimate Edition home media release.

Dawn of Justice is Affleck's second film as a comic book superhero; he played Daredevil in the 2003 film of the same name, and was initially reluctant to accept playing Batman, citing that he "felt [he] didn't fit the traditional mold", but he became excited after Snyder showed him the concept and reassured him that the film would be different from Nolan's trilogy. Affleck's dislike of Daredevil inspired him to take the role.

Snyder cast an older Batman to be a layered juxtaposition against a younger Superman; while "bear[ing] the scars of a seasoned crime fighter, but retain[ing] the charm that the world sees in billionaire Bruce Wayne." Nolan was involved with the casting of Affleck and he was the first actor Snyder approached for the part. Ryan Gosling, Joe Manganiello, Richard Armitage, Max Martini and Matthew Goode were considered for the role. The director had also discussed the part with Josh Brolin. Christian Bale admitted he wanted to play Batman again after The Dark Knight Rises, though he stated that his Batman does not belong in any other film and he was never approached by Warner Bros. to play the role again. Jason Momoa auditioned for Batman, but was cast as Aquaman instead.

Snyder offered the role of Jimmy Olsen to Eisenberg, but he turned it down as he didn't feel he was right for that role; Snyder would eventually offered him the role of Lex Luthor. On casting Eisenberg as Lex Luthor, Snyder offered, "Having Jesse in the role allows us to explore that interesting dynamic, and also take the character in some new and unexpected directions". Leonardo DiCaprio, Tom Hanks, Joaquin Phoenix, Bryan Cranston and Adam Driver were considered for the role. Producer Charles Roven revealed that this incarnation of Wonder Woman would use the character's origins from 2011's The New 52 reboot of the DC continuity, wherein the character would be a demigoddess, and the daughter of Zeus. This deviates from the character's original origins, where she was "a clay figure brought to life by the gods". Olga Kurylenko, Jaimie Alexander and Élodie Yung were considered for the role of Wonder Woman before Gadot was cast. Dawn of Justice is Ray Fisher's feature film debut, and the first live-action film to feature Cyborg, whose role originally was to become more significant in future DC Comics films. It is also the live-action theatrical debut of Aquaman.

The casting of Affleck, Gadot, and Eisenberg was criticized. Affleck's casting caused significant backlash from comic book fans, with multiple online petitions demanding his removal from the role; unlike previous Batman actors, he was not considered intimidating enough for the role by the protesters. Conversely, PopMatters journalist J.C. Maçek III supported Affleck's casting as Batman, stating, "Way back when the news was new I wrote a PopMatters article defending the choice of Ben Affleck as Batman. I'll let that one speak for itself." Via social media, fans criticized Gadot's small frame in contrast to Wonder Woman's warrior-like build in the comics. Responding to this, Gadot stated that she had been participating in various training regimens to achieve a body that stays closer to the source material. Fans also criticized Eisenberg's casting, feeling that the then-30-year-old was too young for the role, and not physically imposing enough. Upon the film's release, both Affleck and Gadot received considerable praise for their performances, despite the overall negative reception of the film itself.

=== Design ===
Michael Wilkinson reprised his duties as costume designer. He updated the Superman suit from Man of Steel so that it "feels fresh and right for this installment of Zack Snyder's comic-book universe". The first Batsuit featured in the film is influenced by The Dark Knight Returns; unlike the suits seen in previous live-action Batman films, it is made of cloth instead of armor and is a cast of the physique of fitness model Rossano Rea. An image of the Wonder Woman costume was revealed at the 2014 San Diego Comic-Con, in which the costume desaturates the red, blue, and gold colors that make up the costume of most versions of the character.

A second Batsuit was also unveiled at Comic-Con, and unlike the first, it is armored. Aquaman's look in this film shows him "tattooed in Maori-like patterns", and wearing a suit "decked out in shades of gold, black and silver armor". According to the Warner Bros. Studios lot, the next generation Batmobile combined inspiration from both the sleek, streamlined design of classic Batmobiles and the high-suspension, military build from the more recent Tumbler from The Dark Knight Trilogy. Designed by production designer Patrick Tatopoulos, the Batmobile is about 20 feet (6.1 m) long and 12 feet (3.66 m) wide. The glasses Cavill wears as Clark Kent are made by British spectacle designer Tom Davies.

=== Filming ===
In September 2013, Larry Fong joined the crew as cinematographer, having previously worked with Zack Snyder on 300, Watchmen, and Sucker Punch. Initial filming commenced on October 19, 2013, at East Los Angeles College, to shoot an American football game between Gotham City University and rival Metropolis State University. At the end of the month, construction began on the Kent farm seen in Man of Steel for the film. Principal photography involving the main cast of the film began on May 19, 2014, in Detroit, Michigan, with scenes featuring Gal Gadot as Diana Prince being filmed early on May 16. While filming in Michigan, the production spent a total of $199 million in the state. The scene of a state funeral at the Arlington National Cemetery, a tribute by the United States Army, was actually filmed in Michigan as well, using green screen.

Additional filming began in Chicago, Illinois in November 2014. Other locations included the Michigan Motion Picture Studios, the Eli and Edythe Broad Art Museum at Michigan State University, Yorkville, Illinois, the South Pacific, and New Mexico. Sequences of the film, including a scene depicting the murder of Bruce Wayne's parents, were filmed using IMAX cameras. The planned shoot in Morocco was shifted to New Mexico due to incidents related to the 2014 Ebola outbreak. Principal photography wrapped on December 5, 2014.

=== Music ===
Hans Zimmer composed the film score, emphasizing a challenge not to reuse the themes he established with the Batman character from Christopher Nolan's trilogy. Junkie XL, who provided additional music in Man of Steel, also returned for this film, helping to compose the theme for Batman. Originally, Zimmer enlisted Junkie XL to compose the Batman material, with Zimmer planning to focus solely on the Superman side of the score, but the final Batman theme was written by both composers as a collaboration. Zimmer noted that he had significant trouble in finding a new angle from which to tell the story and after the release of the film, Zimmer announced that he was retired from superhero films, though he has since retracted this. The soundtrack album of the film was released on March 18, 2016, by WaterTower Music.

Songs featured in the film include: "Kang Ling (An Instrument Made From A Human Thigh Bone)", a traditional song performed by the monks of the Dip Tse Chok Ling Monastery, Dharamshala; "Night and Day" and "Ev'ry Time We Say Goodbye" written by Cole Porter and performed by Richard Cheese; "Shostakovich: Waltz II (Jazz Suite No. 2)" written by Dmitri Shostakovich performed by the Royal Concertgebouw Orchestra conducted by Riccardo Chailly; and "Amazing Grace" arranged and performed by John Allan and again performed by the Canadian Scottish Regiment Pipes and Drums and the United States Third Marine Aircraft Wing Band.

== Marketing ==
An estimated $165 million marketing effort helped promote Batman v Superman: Dawn of Justice. At the 2014 San Diego Comic-Con, Snyder introduced the film's first footage intended to be exclusive to the event. A teaser trailer was scheduled to be screened in selected cinemas on April 20, 2015. However, on April 16, the trailer leaked online, and within a few hours Snyder officially released the trailer to Twitter. At the 2015 San Diego Comic-Con, Snyder and the cast attended to present an initial trailer of the film. While the teaser had received mixed response, the trailer was positively received by attendees, who gave it a standing ovation. Mark Hughes of Forbes said the trailers "both set the stage for a story about the world's distrust and fear of Superman, Batman's rage at Superman and intention to duke it out with the Man of Steel, and Wonder Woman's participation in a big fight featuring the 'Trinity'."

Warner Bros. Consumer Products partnered-up with "a powerhouse slate of global licensees for a broad, multi-category licensing and merchandising program", including Mattel, Lego, Rubies, Funko, Thinkway Toys, Hot Toys, Junkfood, Bioworld, Pez, Seiko, Converse and among many other licensees to sell merchandise related to the film. Fiat Chrysler Automobiles was also a licensee for the film, offering a special edition Jeep Renegade in exchange for a near-exclusive product placement deal; aside from Bruce Wayne's Aston Martin, all vehicles in the film were either from Chrysler, Dodge, Jeep, Ram, or Iveco. Batman v Superman: Dawn of Justice – Cross Fire, an original companion novel tied to the film, telling a tie-in story set before the events of the movie, was published by Scholastic Corporation.

Also, there are a series of four minicomics found in Batman v Superman-branded General Mills cereals. Additionally, those who purchased Batman v Superman-themed Doritos Family Fun Mix at Walmart received the comic book prequel Batman v Superman: Dawn of Justice – Upstairs/Downstairs. Rocksteady Studios released downloadable content for the video game Batman: Arkham Knight that featured the Batmobile and Batsuit from the film.

The third trailer debuted on Jimmy Kimmel Live! on December 3, 2015. It received positive responses, with Scott Mendelson of Forbes calling the trailer a "Saturday morning cartoon nerd's wildest dreams." Molly Driscoll of CS Monitor stated that it looks like the film "will continue the trend of adapting comic book stories as timely tales." Graeme McMillan of The Hollywood Reporter noted that based on the trailer's content, the film might be the anti-Civil War, referring to Marvel's Captain America: Civil War as "Superman and Batman complete the comic book trope by overcoming their differences to fight a common foe, alongside a third hero, who saves them both — that feels the most fresh, especially in light of the Civil War trailer. While that ended with a showdown between three heroes, this trailer moves beyond that to show three heroes standing united." However, it was criticized for revealing that, with Rob Tornoe of NewsWorks pointing out that this trailer was targeting the "broadest audience" rather than just fans, as studios try to "maximize a film's opening day box office."

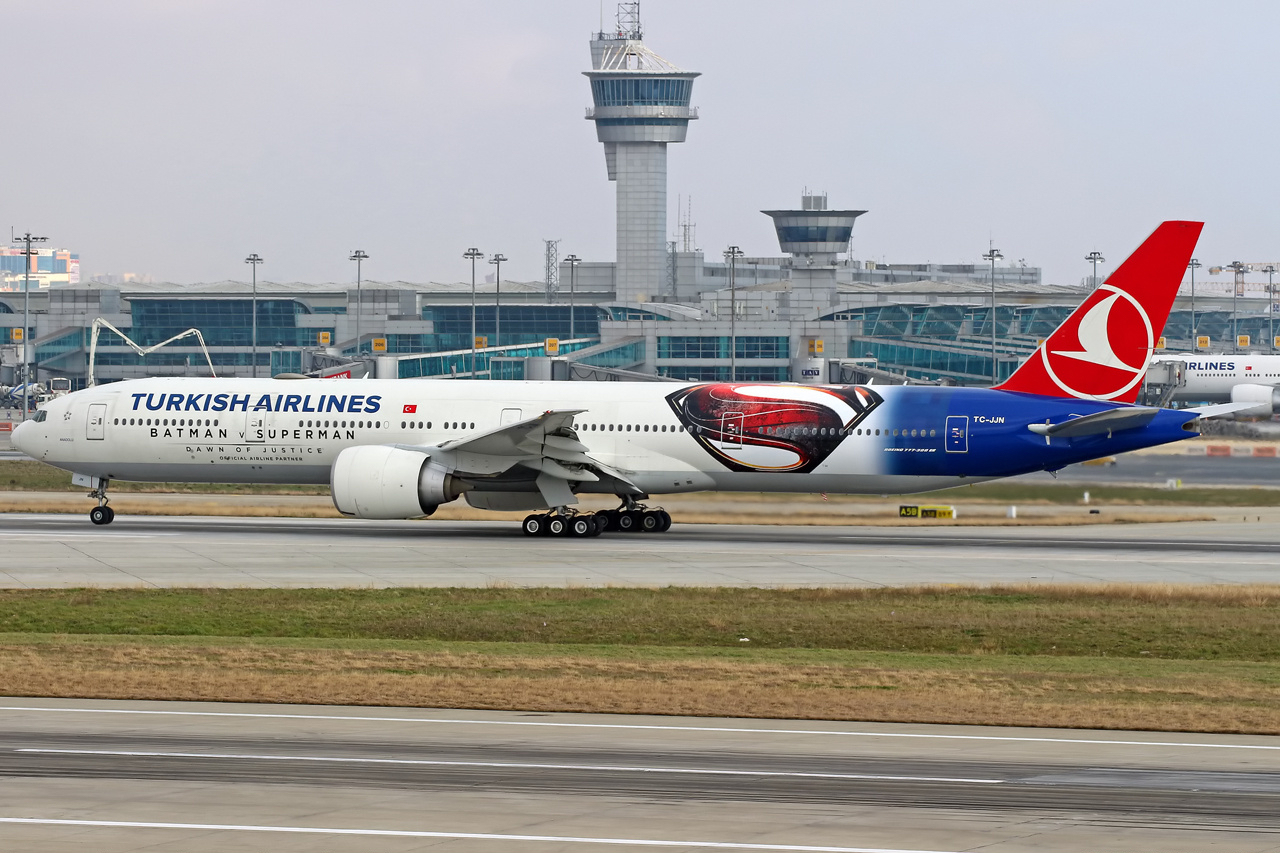
An advertisement for the film on Turkish Airlines' Boeing 777-300ER at Istanbul Atatürk Airport

Warner Bros. did not buy a Super Bowl 50 commercial; instead, they worked with Turkish Airlines to put together a pair of Batman v Superman-themed airline commercials. McMillan of The Hollywood Reporter stated that the spots "inform interested parties about the culture, geography and history of Batman and Superman's individual stomping grounds, each one filled with Easter eggs for the comic book faithful and newcomer alike." Jesse Eisenberg's part as Lex Luthor in these commercials was praised, as Dirk Libbey of CinemaBlend noted that "he matches up well with Bruce Wayne by playing the welcoming billionaire business man. It's a far cry from the somewhat cartoonish villain we've seen in the clips from the film."

The final trailer was released to the public on February 11, 2016, which was described as "intense" by Kwame Opam of The Verge. Mendelson of Forbes felt that Warner Bros. "probably wouldn't have even dropped this one had the prior trailer back in December been received better. So now we have this fourth and final sell, and at least they are going out on a high note." Jonathon Dornbush of Entertainment Weekly said that the footage "works to establish Batman as his own independent crime fighting force, while also providing a deeper look at his existential struggle against Superman."

In February 2016, Warner Bros. and Doritos formed a partnership, creating a website offering fans the opportunity to enter codes found on Doritos purchases branded with the film's logo, and enter to win movie tickets, tech toys, and a trip the premiere in New York City. Warner Bros. also partnered with Omaze to give fans who donated a chance to win "The Ultimate Batman v Superman: Dawn of Justice Experience", while benefiting three nonprofit organizations nominated by Ben Affleck, Henry Cavill and Jesse Eisenberg. "The Ultimate Batman v Superman: Dawn of Justice Experience" offered a fan and their friend the chance to win tickets to the premiere of the film, as well as fly on a helicopter with Cavill or ride in the Batmobile with Affleck. Hendrick Motorsports drivers Jimmie Johnson and Dale Earnhardt Jr. drove cars based on Superman and Batman respectively, at Auto Club Speedway on March 20, 2016. A tie-in endless runner video game to the film, entitled Batman vs Superman – Who Will Win?, debuted March 16, 2016, released by Warner Bros. International Enterprises.

== Release ==
In November 2013, Warner Bros. announced that Batman v Superman: Dawn of Justice would be released on July 17, 2015. In January 2014, however, the studio announced that it was delayed from its original release date and moved to May 6, 2016, in order to give the filmmakers "time to realize fully their vision, given the complex visual nature of the story." In August 2014, the release date was moved up to March 25, 2016, with a Warner Bros. insider saying the studio was "not flinching" in regards to the previous opening date being on the same day as Marvel Studios' Captain America: Civil War, but instead stating that March 2016 was a "fantastic corridor" for them. According to The Hollywood Reporter, Warner Bros. considered a 70mm release for the film.

Batman v Superman: Dawn of Justice premiered at Auditorio Nacional in Mexico City on March 19, 2016, followed by a New York City premiere on March 20 at Radio City Music Hall. Following the 2016 Brussels bombings, Warner Bros. originally cancelled the red carpet of the London premiere, but decided to carry on with the premiere for the fans. The film was released in the United States and the United Kingdom on March 25 in 3D. It opened simultaneously in North America, China and Japan, the world's three largest film markets, as well as additional international territories, with the exception of Poland, where theaters do not open on Good Friday. The film debuted simultaneously across 30,000 screens in nearly every major foreign territory across 61 markets, including China. In the United States, it opened across roughly 4,242 locations, of which 3,500 theaters (85%) were in 3D, 390 IMAX screens, 470 PLF locations, 150 D-Box theaters and ten 70 mm prints.

== Reception ==
=== Box office ===
The film grossed $166 million in the United States and Canada in its opening weekend, the eighth-biggest opening of all time, ahead of The Dark Knight Rises' $160.9 million. The film had a worldwide opening of $422.5 million, which stands as the second-biggest for Warner Bros. and the fourth-biggest of all time at the time of its release. It became the fourth film to have a global opening above $400 million. It also had an IMAX worldwide opening weekend total of $36 million from 945 IMAX screens, the third-biggest ever, behind Star Wars: The Force Awakens ($48 million) and Jurassic World ($44 million). However, both inside and outside of the United States, Batman v Superman: Dawn of Justice experienced a notable poor Friday-to-Sunday hold and set a new record for the worst Friday-to-Sunday drop for a superhero movie release in modern box office history with a 58% decline, which was previously held by 2015's Fantastic Four.

In its second weekend, Batman v Superman: Dawn of Justice experienced a "historic" box-office drop, with an 81.2% decline on Friday that was "one of the biggest Friday-to-Friday drops any blockbuster has ever seen", and an overall 68.4% drop for the weekend despite not "facing any big competition at the box office", making it the second largest decline for a marquee superhero title, behind only 2003's Hulk. Brad Brevet, writing for Box Office Mojo, reported that "it appeared Batman v Superman was looking at a drop anywhere from 58–68% and it ended up settling in on the wrong side of those expectations." Scott Mendelson, writing for Forbes, said "Whether or not the movie is any good, and whether or not audiences respond to the picture, is best measured by the second and third weekends...Yes, we're still talking about a $15.35 million second Friday and a $50m+ second weekend, but in terms of legs, this film sadly doesn't seem to have any." Continuing this trend, in its third weekend, the film dropped by 54.3% in which Brad Brevet concluded in a follow-up for Box Office Mojo that "the legs on this one are proving quite short."

In the weeks leading up to the film's release, advance ticket sales outpaced The Dark Knight Rises, The Avengers, and Furious 7. Worldwide, it was estimated to gross between $300–340 million in over 35,000 screens in its opening weekend. It passed the $50 million mark in IMAX ticket sales on its second weekend, grossing a total of $53.4 million from 571 IMAX screens. Warner Bros. US distribution chief Jeff Goldstein described the film's box office performance as a "fantastic result, by any measure". Box office analyst Jeff Bock said "Still, outside of Christopher Nolan's two Dark Knight movies, and Tim Burton's Batman films when you adjust for inflation, this is the highest-grossing property in DC's bullpen thus far. It tops Man of Steel by more than $200 million," and that "overall, BvS successfully relaunched DC's cinematic universe." The film needed to reach $800 million in revenue at the box office to "recoup its investment" according to financial analysts. Despite surpassing this amount, it was considered "a disappointment" for failing to reach $1 billion. This resulted in Warner Bros. creating DC Films in May 2016, giving a dedicated executive team responsibility for films based on DC Comics, similar to the dedicated Marvel Comics focus of Marvel Studios within the larger Walt Disney Studios group. Batman v Superman: Dawn of Justice grossed $330.4 million in North America and $544 million in other territories for a worldwide total of $874.4 million, making it the seventh-highest-grossing film of 2016. Deadline Hollywood calculated the net profit of the film to be $105.7 million, when factoring together all expenses and revenues for the film.

==== North America ====
Following reports of pre-tickets sales in both the United States and Canada on February 29, many insiders and analysts predicted an opening weekend haul between $120–140 million for Batman v Superman: Dawn of Justice, with projections as high as $185 million. According to Deadline Hollywood, an undisclosed rival studio box office analyst indicated that if the film is truly pacing in tandem with The Dark Knight Rises, then Dawn of Justice could possibly be looking at a $180 million+ debut. The film also became Fandango's top pre-selling superhero film ever, representing 90% of the site's weekend's ticket sales. A survey carried out showed that the introduction of Wonder Woman is a primary draw for moviegoers. It pre-sold around $20–25 million worth of advance tickets. Dawn of Justice made $27.7 million in Thursday previews from around 3,800 theaters which is the biggest of 2016, the biggest Easter weekend preview, the second-biggest for a superhero film (behind The Dark Knight Rises), and the seventh-biggest of all time of which $3.0 million came from IMAX showings, also a new record for Easter weekend.

On its opening day, it earned $81.59 million from 4,242 theaters, including previews, marking the biggest pre-summer opening day of all time, the second-biggest superhero Friday opening and the fourth-biggest opening-day and fourth-biggest single-day gross, with $9 million coming from IMAX showings. Excluding the Thursday previews, it earned $53.89 million on Friday which is the fifth-biggest ever. It fell 37.8% on Saturday, which is the second-worst superhero opening Friday-to-Saturday drop, only behind the 40% drop of The Dark Knight Rises. In total, it earned $166 million for its debut weekend, setting records for the biggest March and pre-summer openings, the biggest Easter opening, the second-biggest opening for Warner Bros., the biggest for a DC Comics property, and the eighth-biggest opening of all time. Conversely, the film holds the record for the worst superhero Friday-to-Sunday drop with a 58% decline, eclipsing the previous 48% decline record held by Fantastic Four in 2015. IMAX comprised 11% or $18 million of the weekend's gross from 388 theaters which is the fifth-biggest of all time (a record it shares with Age of Ultron) and 3D represented 40% ($68 million) of the total ticket sales. RealD 3D comprised $47 million of the opening gross. Premium large formats generated $17.6 million (10%), with $3.6 million of that coming from Cinemark XD auditoriums from 475 theaters.

Following its record breaking opening weekend, it posted the biggest March Monday with $15.05 million, a drop of 55% from its Sunday gross. This broke The Hunger Games' previous record of $10.8 million, and also the biggest March Tuesday with $12.2 million. It made $209 million in its first week full which stands at the eleventh-biggest opening week of all time and surpassed the lifetime total Batman Begins. Despite earning $15.35 million in its second Friday, the film dropped 81.2% and broke the record for the biggest Friday-to-Friday drop for a comic book adaptation film, not including $27.7 million worth of previews which represented an even larger decline. It fell precipitously by 69.1% in its second weekend, grossing $51.3 million from 4,256 theaters (an addition of 14 cinemas) due to poor reviews and mixed word of mouth, establishing itself an infamous record for the seventh steepest drop for a superhero/comic book adapted film and the steepest decline since the −69% posted by X-Men Origins: Wolverine in 2009, despite facing little to no competition or new wide-releases and having the added benefit of 30% K–12 schools off, and 9% of colleges on break, per ComScore. The steep drop also marks the fourth-biggest for a film that opened above $100 million (tied with The Twilight Saga: Breaking Dawn – Part 2). In its third weekend it was overtaken by the comedy The Boss after falling 54% with $23.3 million.

Batman v Superman: Dawn of Justice proved to be front-loaded, failing to generate significant revenue after its opening weekend/week release. It earned just 1.99 times ($330 million) its opening weekend numbers ($166 million), which is lower than Man of Steel's 2.28 multiplier. Like other DC films, such as Watchmen, Green Lantern and Man of Steel, it opened to record breaking numbers but then dropped the following weekend onward due largely to bad critical reception and mixed word of mouth from audiences. A similar result was followed by DC's third superhero film, Suicide Squad released in August 2016, although Suicide Squad became less front-loaded than Dawn of Justice.

==== Outside North America ====
Internationally, it was projected to open between $180–200 million. It opened in ten countries on Wednesday, March 23, 2016, earning $7 million and debuting at No. 1 in all markets on approximately 5,900 screens. The following day, the film was released in 38 additional countries, earning $33.1 million on 19,700 screens for a two-day total of $44 million. On March 25, it opened in the remaining 17 countries delivering $67.2 million in revenue, for a three-day total of $115.3 million in 62 countries on more than 30,000 screens. Through Sunday, March 27, it earned an opening-weekend total of $256.5 million from 66 countries on over 40,000 screens, making it the biggest superhero opening weekend of all time, the biggest overall March opening, the second-biggest opening ever for Warner Bros., and the fifth-biggest international opening on record. The film's accomplishments also included the second-biggest IMAX opening record of $18 million, behind only Jurassic World which tallied $23.5 million. 3D accounted 59% or $149.86 million of the weekend gross led by China (98%), Germany (88%), Brazil (81%), Russia (55%), and France (51%). As with North America, the film witnessed a steep decline in its second Friday internationally, falling 72% to $19.2 million, with the biggest decline in the U.K. (77%) and China (87%). Its second weekend earnings fell 66% overall to $85.25 million. Despite the decline, the film topped the box office for three consecutive weekends.

In Mexico, it had the biggest opening day for Warner Bros. and the second-biggest of all time with $5.8 million, including record-breaking midnight showings. It also scored the biggest opening day of all time in Brazil ($3.5 million) and the biggest opening day for a superhero film in Germany ($2.8 million). Elsewhere, it opened in the United Kingdom and Ireland ($9 million), Australia ($2.5 million), India ($2.54 million), Russia ($1.9 million), South Korea ($1.7 million), Japan ($1.2 million), the United Arab Emirates and Hong Kong ($1.1 million respectively). In China, it earned $21.22 million on its opening day, including around $1.34 million worth of previews, which is the biggest for Warner Bros. and the sixth-biggest Hollywood opening day of all time. However, other Chinese sources have the film open to around $20 million. In terms of opening weekends, the biggest openings were recorded in China ($57.2 million), the United Kingdom and Ireland ($20.7 million), Mexico ($18.2 million), Brazil ($12 million), South Korea ($10.2 million), Australia ($9.9 million), France ($8.6 million), Germany ($8.1 million), Russia ($7.7 million), India ($6.6 million), Spain ($6.1 million) and Japan ($4.5 million). It broke all-time opening record in Brazil and Warner Bros. opening records in Mexico, Hong Kong, India, Malaysia, Singapore, Vietnam, Argentina, Bolivia, Chile, Colombia, Peru, Puerto Rico and Venezuela. In the United Kingdom and Ireland, it benefited from the long Easter weekend holiday and despite a distinctly mixed bag of reviews in the U.K. press, it posted an opening £14.62 million or $20.7 million from 612 theaters, a record for 2016 so far and for a superhero title on straight Friday to Sunday, but fell short of The Avengers and Avengers: Age of Ultron, when accounting for previews.

In Japan, it opened in third place, behind two local films, Assassination Classroom: Graduation and Doraemon: Nobita and the Birth of Japan 2016. In South Korea, it scored the biggest March opening after opening on a Tuesday and dominating 68.3% of the market share with $10.2 million. In China, after scoring the biggest Hollywood opening Friday (behind Transformers: Age of Extinction), it earned an estimated $57.2 million from approximately 16,000 screens in its opening weekend, besting all other DC Comics adaption film just by its weekend haul except for Man of Steel and gave Warner Bros. its biggest three day opening there with $7 million coming from 557 IMAX screens. However, the opening figure fell below analysts projections of $70–80 million. It held the top spot for its first seven days only, after which it faced stiff competitions from local productions, and fell dramatically from then onwards in accruing revenue. As a result, it fell to third place in its second weekend after falling enormously by 78% to $12.7 million, a record for a superhero film.

It became the Warner Bros.' highest-grossing film of all time in India, Indonesia, Malaysia, the Philippines and Vietnam. It also crossed $100 million Latin American markets, making it Warner Bros.' second highest-grossing film there. In total earnings, its biggest markets outside of North America are China ($95 million), followed by the UK ($52.1 million), Mexico ($36 million) and Brazil ($35.5 million).

=== Critical response ===
Batman v Superman: Dawn of Justice received negative reviews from critics. The review aggregation website Rotten Tomatoes reported that out of 436 critic reviews, 28% of them were positive, with an average rating of 5.0/10. The site's consensus states: "Batman v Superman: Dawn of Justice smothers a potentially powerful story – and some of America's most iconic superheroes – in a grim whirlwind of effects-driven action." Metacritic assigned the film a weighted average score of 44 out of 100, based on 51 critics, indicating "mixed or average" reviews. Audiences polled by CinemaScore gave the film an average grade of "B" on an A+ to F scale. It earned "B−" from men, "B" from women, a "B" from those under 25 and a "B−" from those over 25. According to PostTrak, 73% of audiences graded the film "very good" or "excellent", with a 60% giving it a "definite recommend". BBC News reported that "the film had been widely praised by fans after its first screening in New York".

Lindy West in The Guardian described the film as "153 minutes of a grown man whacking two dolls together", asking "[h]as the definition of 'movie' changed from 'motion picture story that a human wrote on purpose' to '700 only tangentially related 12-second grey and red vignettes'?" A. O. Scott of The New York Times wrote: "The point of Batman v Superman isn't fun, and it isn't thinking, either. It's obedience. The theology is invoked [...] to buttress a spectacle of power. And in that way the film serves as a metaphor for its own aspirations. The corporations that produce movies like this one, and the ambitious hacks who sign up to make them, have no evident motive beyond their own aggrandizement." Writing in The Telegraph, Robbie Collin called the film "humourless" and "the most incoherent blockbuster in years". Cynthia Fuchs of PopMatters said, "As you're watching this movie, you might also contemplate your own part, in being swayed into consuming so much of what you've consumed before", adding, "Wonder Woman remains Batman v Superman's most compelling story, precisely because it's untold." Matt Patches of Thrillist wrote "what Batman v Superman can do, it does, at the cost of coherency and thrills. The movie is bat-shit crazy. A dour, disdainful demeanor, plus a gluttony of complex plot twists, dissipates most of the contact high." Michael Philips of Chicago Tribune wrote, "A near-total drag, Batman v Superman: Dawn of Justice plays like a loose, unofficial quarter-billion-dollar remake of The Odd Couple, in which Oscar and Felix are literally trying to kill each other." On his podcast Hollywood Babble-On, film director Kevin Smith, a long-time friend and collaborator of Affleck, praised Affleck's performance but panned the film, commenting that it "didn't really have a heart" and was "humorless", arguing that "there seems to be a fundamental lack of understanding of what those characters are about. It's almost like Zack Snyder didn't read a bunch of comics, he read one comic once, and it was Dark Knight Returns, and his favorite part was the last part where Batman and Superman fight." On a second viewing, however, Smith via his Instagram lightened his stance.

David Betancourt of The Washington Post and Scott Mendelson of Forbes praised the film's visual spectacle and performances from Affleck and Gadot, though Mendelson also called the film "an utter mess of thinly sketched characters, haphazard plotting, surprisingly jumbled action". Peter Travers of Rolling Stone called the film "better than Man of Steel but below the high bar set by Nolan's Dark Knight," adding that "Dawn of Justice is still a colossus, the stuff that DC Comics dreams are made of for that kid in all of us who yearns to see Batman and Superman suit up and go in for the kill." Jake Coyle of Associated Press wrote, "it hurtles not with the kinetic momentum of Mad Max: Fury Road nor the comparatively spry skip of a Marvel movie, but with an operatic grandeur it sometimes earns and often doesn't." Mark Hughes of Forbes called it "the follow-up to The Dark Knight that many viewers and fans wanted or hoped for", adding that it's "visually stunning, with powerful emotional storytelling and awe-inspiring action spectacle." Andrew Barker of Variety said "as a pure visual spectacle... Batman V Superman ably blows the hinges off the multiplex doors." Charles Koplinski of the Illinois Times called it "a brooding, but most importantly intelligent take on the seminal figures of our 20th century pop culture mythology, a movie that at once pays tribute to these characters' roots while offering up modern incarnations of them that ring true for our times." Nicolas Barber of the BBC called the film "a four-star epic" praising Affleck's performance as Batman and the visual grandeur of Fong's cinematography. Jordan Hoffman of The Guardian gave an ambivalent review; he especially criticized the "very bad writing", but conceded "there are a lot of moments... that work" and praised Affleck and Gadot's performances, calling Gadot as Wonder Woman the best thing in the film.

Multiple commentators criticized Eisenberg on the grounds that his interpretation of Lex Luthor hewed too close to character traits associated with another DC Comics villain, the Joker. Even before the film was released, Affleck compared Eisenberg's performance to that of Heath Ledger in The Dark Knight. Once the film came out, critics lambasted Eisenberg's take on Luthor. Sonny Bunch of The Washington Post lamented that "As the film progresses, Lex degenerates into a gibbering mad man, some strange mix of the Riddler and the Joker with a little bit of Mark Zuckerberg added for flair." Charlie Jane Anders of Gizmodo wrote that "Someone clearly told Jesse Eisenberg that this movie is the Dark Knight to Man of Steel's Batman Begins, and he's doing his damndest to give a Heath Ledger-esque performance... Watching the trailers, I had thought Eisenberg's loopy acting might be this movie's saving grace – but a concentrated dose of his faux mania actually turns out to be the worst thing." Andy Scott of Grunge, in an article titled "How Jesse Eisenberg Ruined Batman v Superman," wrote that "Eisenberg's speech patterns and mannerisms felt almost entirely lifted from Ledger's iconic performance, to the point where he walked the dangerous grey line between respectful homage and downright thievery." Eisenberg responded to the critiques by saying he attempted to "make these people real and relatable and interesting and engaging, not just, you know, a surface bad person."

Writer Chris Terrio said the decision to remove 30 minutes for the theatrical cut was an act of sabotage. In June 2018, Mise-en-scène: The Journal of Film & Visual Narration published the article "Applying Suspense to Archetypal Superheroes: Hitchcockian Ambiguity in Batman v Superman: Dawn of Justice," which argued that the film "warrants analysis as a particularly ambitious development within the evolving superhero genre. It applies a remarkable amount of Hitchcockian thrills to a story pitting two protagonists against one another within a villain's conspiracy to create the first live-action Hitchcockian superhero thriller featuring branded, culturally established characters. By displacing its protagonists from their inherently justified positions, it creates a critical moral ambiguity that directly deconstructs the assumptions at the heart of Western society's two most archetypal superheroes."

In 2023, Director Zack Snyder dives into why audiences and critics didn't engage with Batman v Superman:

I think that probably is what caused the movie to be so polarizing. I think, and maybe I'm wrong, but I feel like a lot of people went into the movies for going like, "Oh, it's the superhero romp, right? Let's have fun with it." And we gave them this sort of hardcore deconstructivist, heavily layered, experiential modern mythological superhero movie that needs ... that you really need to pay attention to. That was not cool [for them]. That's not something anyone wanted to do. They were like, "What? No! That's exhausting. How about, why do they fight at night?" I hate that.

— Zack Snyder

=== Accolades ===
List of awards and nominations
Award	Category	Recipient(s)	Result	Ref.
Critics' Choice Awards	Best Actress in an Action Movie	Gal Gadot	Nominated	
Golden Raspberry Awards	Worst Picture	Charles Roven and Deborah Snyder	Nominated	
Golden Raspberry Awards	Worst Director	Zack Snyder	Nominated	
Golden Raspberry Awards	Worst Screenplay	Chris Terrio and David S. Goyer	Won	
Golden Raspberry Awards	Worst Actor	Ben Affleck	Nominated	
Golden Raspberry Awards	Worst Actor	Henry Cavill	Nominated	
Golden Raspberry Awards	Worst Supporting Actor	Jesse Eisenberg	Won	
Golden Raspberry Awards	Worst Screen Combo	Ben Affleck and Henry Cavill	Won	
Golden Raspberry Awards	Worst Prequel, Remake, Ripoff or Sequel	Batman v Superman: Dawn of Justice	Won	
Nickelodeon Kids' Choice Awards	Favorite Movie	Batman v Superman: Dawn of Justice	Nominated	
Nickelodeon Kids' Choice Awards	Favorite Movie Actress	Amy Adams	Nominated	
Nickelodeon Kids' Choice Awards	Favorite Movie Actor	Ben Affleck	Nominated	
Nickelodeon Kids' Choice Awards	Favorite Movie Actor	Henry Cavill	Nominated	
Nickelodeon Kids' Choice Awards	Favorite Butt-Kicker	Ben Affleck	Nominated	
Nickelodeon Kids' Choice Awards	Favorite Butt-Kicker	Henry Cavill	Nominated	
Nickelodeon Kids' Choice Awards	Favorite Frenemies	Ben Affleck and Henry Cavill	Nominated	
People's Choice Awards	Favorite Action Movie	Batman v Superman: Dawn of Justice	Nominated	
Saturn Awards	Best Comic-to-Film Motion Picture	Batman v Superman: Dawn of Justice	Nominated	
Teen Choice Awards	Teen Choice Award for Choice Movie - Sci-Fi/Fantasy	Batman v Superman: Dawn of Justice	Nominated	
Teen Choice Awards	Choice Movie Actor: Sci-Fi/Fantasy	Henry Cavill	Nominated	
Teen Choice Awards	Choice Movie Actor: Sci-Fi/Fantasy	Ben Affleck	Nominated	
Teen Choice Awards	Choice Movie Actress: Sci-Fi/Fantasy	Amy Adams	Nominated	
Teen Choice Awards	Choice Movie: Scene Stealer	Gal Gadot	Nominated	
Teen Choice Awards	Choice Movie: Villain	Jesse Eisenberg	Nominated	
Teen Choice Awards	Choice Movie: Liplock	Henry Cavill and Amy Adams	Nominated	
Golden Trailer Awards	Most Original Poster	Warner Bros. Pictures	Won	

== Themes and analysis ==
Batman v Superman has been interpreted as an allegory about contemporary American politics, particularly America's response to 9/11.

Writing for The Commercial Appeal, John Beifuss noted the similarities between the Metropolis battle at the beginning of the film and 9/11: "The idea is that just as 9/11 had a transformative existential impact on the psyche of America, the battle of Metropolis – and the subsequent realization that an all-powerful alien could destroy his adopted planet with ease – has altered human consciousness, creating new standards of morality and levels of fear – "the feeling of powerlessness that turns good men cruel," in the words of Wayne's butler, Alfred (Jeremy Irons)." He says that Batman comes out of the Metropolis battle scene as "a changed – and even more deranged – man."

Kofi Outlaw of ComicBook.com interpreted the allegory as Batman representing "the right-wing hawk reaction to 9/11... an America that prefers security over civil liberties; the Bush-era mentality of stopping threats pro-actively before they can threaten close to home". Meanwhile, Superman, Outlaw writes, represents "the more left-wing, liberal, American ideal", while Luthor represents "insidious opportunists who exploited (and still exploit) the turmoil of a post-9/11, war-torn, world for personal gain." Outlaw suggests that the scene where Batman and Superman find common ground in their mothers is parallel to the notion that conflicting political ideologies still have similarities.

Writing for Screen Rant, Andrew Dyce wrote "Bruce has, like so many political figures and nations, given up the moral high ground, rationalized his extreme methods as necessary, identified an enemy he does not seek to understand, and abandoned the spirit, if not the explicit values upon which his country – rather, upon which his mission was founded."

Writing for Vice, Kaleem Aftab wrote that the film "was intended as an unpleasant lambast of the government and the popular reaction to 9/11." He compared Superman's character to the Muslim American experience, concluding that the film "is a condemnation of what America is becoming, a place where immigrants, especially those unfairly tainted because of the mass destruction caused by a few, are no longer part of a viable American dream."

Writing for The New Yorker, Richard Brody analyzed the allegory differently: Batman, according to Brody, represents the Democratic Party, whereas Superman represents the Republican Party. Brody feels this notion is supported by the fact that Batman's eyes glow blue when he is wearing the exoskeleton and Superman's glow red when he uses his heat vision. Brody criticized this allegory as "salacious" for suggesting that the Democratic Party allies itself with evil, which he says "has no relationship to contemporary politics". However, he called it "a powerful metaphor" for suggesting "there'd be much less of an urge to find a superhero—or to magnify demagogues who pretend to be one—if politicians merely did their jobs competently and sensitively."

Mark Hughes writing for Forbes notes that the film inverts the politics of The Dark Knight Returns by having Superman as the outsider character who is questioned by the government and media. He writes "This is a reversal of sorts from the comic, where Superman represents the establishment perspective while Batman is the outcast under constant press, public, and government scrutiny." He also noted how Batman sees Superman as human for the first time during the Martha scene: "he's never looked at Superman as a real person or as a man before. Then suddenly Superman is vulnerable, he has a regular guy's name and a woman who loves him crying over him, and a mom – his last words are basically "save my mother." We see, very emotionally, how Batman realizes what he's doing and that he's the bad guy, a painful but very human revelatory moment."

Richard Newby writing for The Hollywood Reporter, wrote the Martha scene "is Bruce's opportunity to reconnect with his own humanity and the humanity of Superman. Batman doesn't end the fight because their mothers have the same name, but because he recognizes Superman as someone with a mother, and thus a human, despite his alien origins. The battle against Superman is ultimately Bruce's realization that he can be better and reconnect with humanity again. It's not a redemption, or a full change, as he does kill mercenaries at the warehouse in the following scene, but it is a start."

Ben Affleck said he liked the "idea of showing accountability and the consequences of violence and seeing that there are real people in those buildings", with the scene of Bruce Wayne at the battle of Metropolis.

== Director's cut ==
An extended cut of the film dubbed the "Ultimate Edition" was released on home media platforms, alongside the theatrical cut. This version is longer by 31 minutes, and received an R rating from the Motion Picture Association of America, for more violence than the PG-13 rated theatrical cut. Upon the release of the Ultimate Edition, critics noted that the film would have likely been better received with the additional footage. Mark Hughes of Forbes stated that "while not everyone changed their 'hated it' ratings to 'loved it' after viewing the new 3-hour edit of the film, it appears most so far are declaring the longer version a big improvement, moving the film out of the 'bad' column and into the 'good.'". He also stated that the film's reputation would improve with future retrospect, and with the director's cut, "that process got underway even faster than [he] expected when the ultimate edition got its one-night theatrical release." Ben Kendrick of Screen Rant stated that while it was more "intelligible", character portrayal was not "fundamentally changed" and "for viewers who didn't like Man of Steel or Batman v Superman for larger reasons, such as tone, approach, and the darker characterization of DC's most iconic heroes, the Ultimate Edition is only a longer... version of a film that... is likely to remain divisive, even if the final product is a better film." Phil Owens of TheWrap called it an improvement upon the original cut, writing, "Lo and behold somehow Batman v Superman: Dawn of Justice has become something that approaches a functional movie. In the process, it only makes the original cut even more inexplicable and terrible."

== Home video ==
On the home video sales chart, the film debuted in first place for the week ending July 24, 2016. In the United States, it made $23.4 million in DVD sales and $58.9 million in Blu-ray sales, for an estimated total of $82.4 million. The film was the seventh best-selling video title of 2016.

Despite being shot partially on IMAX film and released to IMAX theaters with select scenes in either 1.43:1 or 1.90:1, the initial Blu-ray release only featured the fixed 2.39:1 aspect ratio that was used for non-IMAX screenings. However, on December 12, 2020, Snyder revealed that he is working to restore the IMAX ratio to the film for an upcoming re-release in 2021. On March 4, 2021, Warner Bros. announced that a remastered version of the Ultimate Edition (with the IMAX scenes presented in their original aspect ratio of 1.43:1) would be released on to digital platforms and HBO Max on March 18, 2021 (the same day Zack Snyder's Justice League was released), and would also be released on Ultra HD Blu-ray several days later on March 23.
