= Shang Xia =

Chinese retail brand

Shang Xia is a Chinese brand which produces handbags, shoes, clothing, and furniture. It is majority-owned by Dutch holding company Exor NV.

== History ==
Shang Xia was founded in 2010 as a joint collaboration between Hermès Group and Chinese designer Jiang Qiong-er. The brand's first bag, the Lan Yue, was a leather-textured imitation of a bamboo bowl. Its Da Tian Di chair is a reinterpretation of the Ming dynasty furniture style.

Shang Xia opened its first store outside of China, in Paris, in 2013.

In December 2020, Exor invested around €80 million in Shang Xia, and in 2021, Exor became the majority owner. In the same year, Yang Li was appointed its fashion creative director. Shang Xia presented its first collection at the 2021 Paris Fashion Week. In 2022, Sophia Wu, who was Shang Xia's chief operating officer, was promoted to CEO.

== Etymology ==
Shang Xia (Chinese: 上下) means 'up and down' in Chinese.
