= Lara Boro =

American media executive

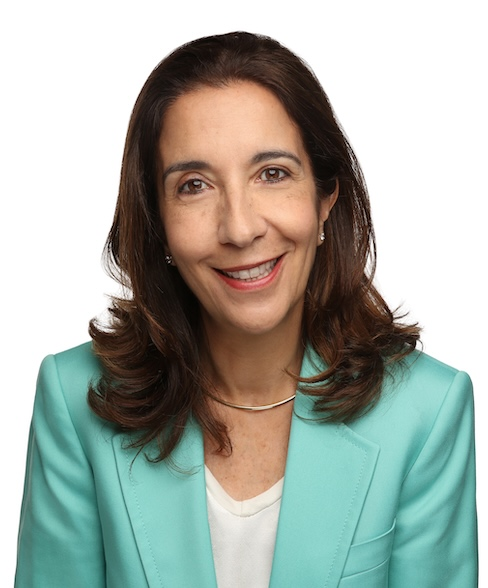
- Lara Boro in 2024
- Born: August 1, 1967 (age 58); Dubrovnik, Croatia
- Education: Lycee Francais Charles de Gaulle
- Alma mater: UCLA; INSEAD
- Occupation: CEO of The Economist Group
- Children: 2
- Website: LinkedIn profile

Lara Boro (born August 1, 1967) is a media executive and current CEO of The Economist Group, a position she has held since 2019. Prior to The Economist Group, she ran the Intelligence arm of Informa plc, served as CEO International at Ascential plc and held senior-level positions at CPA Global, the Financial Times and Mondex International.

== Early life and education ==
Lara Boro was born in Dubrovnik, Croatia, to a Lebanese father and a Croatian-Austrian mother. She grew up in Lebanon until the war of 1975 when she moved to the former Yugoslavia and later to the UK. She attended the Lycée Français Charles de Gaulle and later studied economics and business at UCLA. She also earned an MBA at INSEAD in France.

== Career ==
Boro began her career at Mondex International where she worked in commercial development. She went on to work for the Financial Times where she became head of e-commerce in 1999, spending four years with the publication. She also spent time with CPA Global where she held positions in strategy, Mergers and acquisitions, and commercial development. She also served as the CEO of the international division of Ascential plc prior to moving on to Informa.

Boro joined Informa plc in 2014 where she was strategy director for the B2B division of the company. She later became divisional CEO where she was head of the Group’s data and information businesses.

In 2019, Boro left Informa to become the CEO of The Economist Group. At The Economist Group, Boro oversaw The Economist's transition from print into a primarily digital publication. She also oversaw the launch of the Economist Impact in 2021, an initiative that brought together The Economist Group’s policy research, sponsored content, advertising and events under one brand. In 2022, she became an advisory board member at MIT Technology Review and joined the advisory board of Hakluyt & Company in 2026.

== Personal life ==
Boro is married, lives in London and has two children.
