= The Economist Group =

Media company headquartered in London, England

The Economist Newspaper Limited
- Trade name: The Economist Group
- Type: Private limited company
- Founded: 1843; 183 years ago in London
- Founder: James Wilson
- Headquarters: London, England
- Area served: Worldwide
- Key people: Paul Deighton (chairman); Lara Salameh Boro (CEO)
- Products: Newspapers, magazines, books, films, podcasts
- Services: Market intelligence, conferences
- Revenue: ▼£367.0 million (2024)
- Operating income: ▲£47.4 million (2024)
- Net income: ▼£31.2 million (2023)
- Total assets: ▲£187.5 million (2023)
- Total equity: ▲£(76.1) million (2023)
- Owners: Exor N.V. (43.4%); Smith Financial Corporation (26.7%); Cadbury; Schroder; Layton
- Number of employees: 1,641 (2023)
- Divisions: Economist Intelligence Unit, EuroFinance
- Website: economistgroup.com
- Footnotes; Financials as of 31 March 2023.

The Economist Newspaper Limited (commonly the Economist Group) is a British media company headquartered in London, England. It is best known as publisher of The Economist newspaper and its sister lifestyle magazine, 1843. The Economist Group specialises in international business and world affairs information. Its principal activities are in print and digital media as well as in conferences and market intelligence.

== Ownership ==
After the death of its founder James Wilson in 1860, The Economist was held in testamentary trust for his six daughters and their dependents. The eldest, Mrs Bagehot, whose husband Walter was editor at the time of Wilson's death, maintained a close personal interest in the paper until her death in 1921. Subsequently, the Wilson trustees were concerned whether surviving beneficiaries would keep touch with the paper's direction, as further deaths formed subsidiary trusts over time. So in 1928 the Wilson Trust decided to sell the paper, whilst creating a structure intended to maintain its reputation for 'independent judgment and unfettered criticism'. A non-controlling 50% went to the Financial Times, and the other half to an influential group of individual shareholders. A new board of independent trustees was created, with rights both to veto the transfer of voting shares and to choose or remove editors-in-chief, who in turn would have sole responsibility for the paper's policy.

Ownership of the 50% shareholding passed to Pearson plc when they bought the Financial Times Limited (FT) in 1957. Later, however, when Pearson plc was negotiating the sale of FT, the Economist's independent trustees vetoed 'complicated attempts at a deal'. Finally, in August 2015, as part of their sale of the FT to Nikkei, Inc., Pearson sold their share in the Economist.

The Agnelli family's Exor paid £287 million to raise their stake from 4.7% to 43.4%, while the Economist paid £182 million for the balance of 5.04 million shares which will be distributed to current shareholders. Aside from the Agnelli family, smaller shareholders in the company include Cadbury, Rothschild (21%), Schroder, Layton and other family interests as well as a number of staff and former staff shareholders.

In March 2026, it was reported that the Smith Financial Corp, owned by Canadian billionaire Stephen J. R. Smith and his family, had acquired a 26.9% stake in the Economist Group from Lynn Forester de Rothschild and her family and its foundation.

== History ==
The origins of the Economist Group date back to the foundation of The Economist: A Political, Commercial, Agricultural, & Free-Trade Journal by James Wilson in 1843.

In 1946, the Economist Intelligence Unit began providing business intelligence to both The Economist newspaper and external clients. In the same year, the Economist bookshop was established as a 50:50 joint venture with the London School of Economics.

Economist Conferences was established as a division of Economist Intelligence Unit in 1956 to offer government roundtables.

In 1995, the Economist Group acquired the Journal of Commerce, a US-based provider of information for the shipping and transportation industries. In the same year the Group launched European Voice, the first pan-European Union weekly newspaper.

In July 2004, the Economist Group launched an upmarket lifestyle magazine called Intelligent Life, an annual publication. This magazine was redesigned as a quarterly in September 2007, and became a bi-monthly publication in August 2011. In March 2016, the magazine was renamed 1843.

Launched in 2010, the Ideas People Channel is a vertical online advertising network of around 50 sites defined by the mindset of the audience. The sites recruited for the network were identified by the readers of The Economist as their favourite online destinations for topics on business, globalisation, innovation and culture. The channel competes it the lower-cost, high-volume network advertising market, a category not previously served by The Economist online. Also recently launched is Economist Education, providing e-learning courses.

In March 2012, the Economist Group acquired the London-based marketing communications agency TVC Group for an undisclosed sum.

In April 2012, the Economist Intelligence Unit expanded in Asia with the acquisition of Clearstate, a market intelligence firm specialising in customised strategic advisory and primary research in the healthcare and life sciences domains.

In July 2015, Canback & Company, a strategy consulting firm operating in more than 70 countries was acquired. It is now known as EIU Canback.

== Operations ==
The Economist Group is headquartered in London, England, and has offices worldwide, including in Brussels, Belgium, Frankfurt, Germany, Geneva, Switzerland, Paris, France, Dubai, United Arab Emirates, Johannesburg, South Africa, Hong Kong, mainland China, Singapore, Tokyo, Japan, India, New York City and Washington, D.C. in the United States.

The Economist Group's principal activities are newspapers, magazines, conferences and market intelligence. Publications and services delivered under The Economist brand include The Economist newspaper, The Economist online, Economist Intelligence Unit, Economist Conferences, Economist Corporate Network, The World In series and a bi-monthly lifestyle magazine, 1843. The group's other brands include CQ Roll Call (aimed at decision-makers on Capitol Hill), EuroFinance, a cash and treasury management event business, and a digital media agency, TVC. European Voice (Brussels), formerly a sister publication of CQ Roll Call, was sold to the French company Selectcom in 2013.

=== Economist Intelligence Corporate Network ===
The Economist Intelligence Corporate Network is a members-only service within the Economist Group providing global and regional business intelligence briefings, presentations and advice to its subscribers. The Corporate Network relies on the "information, insight, and interaction" provided by regional experts in its parent organization. 81% of its customers are business executives at the director or senior management levels. It has offices in Dubai, Johannesburg, Beijing, Hong Kong, Shanghai, Singapore and Tokyo.

== Corporate affairs ==
=== Governance ===
The current members of the board of directors of the Economist Group are: Paul Deighton, Baron Deighton (Chairman), Zanny Minton Beddoes (editor-in-chief of The Economist), Lady Suzanne Heywood, Eli Goldstein, Mustafa Suleyman, Diego Piacentini, Georgina Cadbury, M. S. Banga, Lara Boro (Group chief executive).

Former board members include: Andrew Rashbass, Rona Fairhead, Philip Mengel and Eric Schmidt (of Alphabet, parent company of Google). The current trustees of the Group are: Virginia Bottomley, Gus O'Donnell, Tim Clark and Bryan Sanderson.

=== Financial data ===
	2007	2008	2009	2010	2011	2012	2013	2014	2015	2016	2017	2018	2019	2020	2021	2022	2023
Group turnover (in £M)	248	266	313	320	347	359	343	328	324	331	353	367	333	320	310	346	377
Group operating profit (in £M)	36	44	56	58	63	63	64	55	59	61	54	47	31	53	42	46	42
