= Welltec =

International provider of robotic well solutions for the oil and gas industry

Welltec A/S
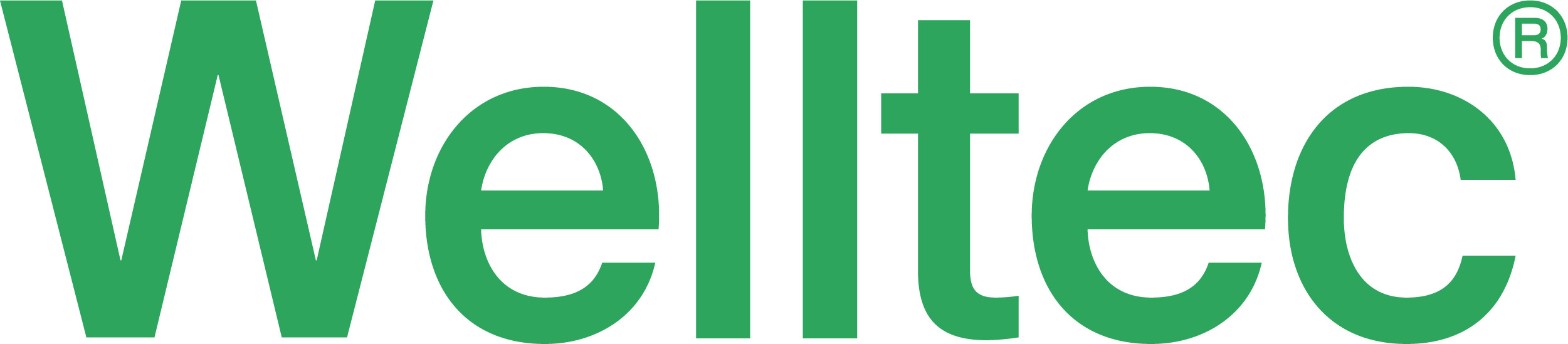
- Industry: Oilfield Services
- Founded: 1994
- Founder: Jørgen Hallundbæk
- Headquarters: Allerød, Denmark
- Key people: Peter Hansen (CEO),
- Revenue: DKK 2 billion
- Owner: Exor N.V. (47.6%)
- Website: welltec.com

Welltec, based in Allerød, Denmark is an international provider of robotic well solutions for the oil and gas industry known for its flagship "Well Tractor". The company was established in 1994 by Jørgen Hallundbæk, who conceived the idea behind the Well Tractor while he was a graduate student at the Technical University of Denmark.

In 2003 the company went from being a subcontractor to other service companies to being a direct contractor to the operators and today the company has established over 45 offices worldwide and employs more than 1,000 people..

== See also ==
- List of oilfield service companies
