= Yang Li (fashion designer) =

Fashion designer

- Born: 1987 (age 38–39); Beijing
- Education: Central Saint Martins
- Label: Yang Li Shang Xia

Yang Li is a Chinese fashion designer based in London. He currently is the creative director of Shang Xia.

== Early life ==
Li was born and lived in Beijing, until moving to Perth, Australia at age 10. Li spent his later youth playing basketball and skateboarding, two sports whose style and expression through clothing were his first introduction to fashion. Yang Li has described music as a profound inspiration that has led to multiple fashion collaborations

== Career ==
Li dabbled in music and briefly studied law to please his parents, but ultimately decided to pursue fashion. Upon receiving a scholarship to Central Saint Martins in 2007, Li moved to London to study fashion. After an internship under English designer Gareth Pugh, Li withdrew from the institution and moved to Belgium to intern under fashion designer Raf Simons. Following his experience described as "working in a creative kitchen", he launched his eponymous label in 2010.

Li's first collection "Zero Hour", released in 2010, was shown through a short film in collaboration with filmmaker and photographer Scott Trindle, in which articles of clothing were cut and repaired in varying degrees, which he saw as an act of "subtle rebellion". He proceeded to release three more collections before his Fall/Winter 2013 Paris debut women's collection, a show dubbed "phenomenal" by Vogue. In 2014, he was shortlisted for the LVMH prize. CLCC SA, a Luxembourg fashion fund who had also funded Raf Simons, made investments in Yang Li in 2015. Li debuted his menswear line in January 2016 for Paris Fashion Week. In 2017, he launched his collaboration label SAMIZDAT.

Li is known for working with underground and cult musicians. For Li's Spring/Summer 2018 collection, the designer partnered with American singer-songwriter Michael Gira for a live performance to accompany his runway show at Palais de Tokyo in Paris. Other music collaborations include Blixa Bargeld of Einstürzende Neubauten, Nick Cave and the Bad Seeds, Justin Broadrick, Keiji Haino, Jehnny Beth, Genesis Porridge, Psychic TV, Ramleh, KK Null, and Pharmakon.

Shang Xia (2021– )

On 22 September 2021, Shang Xia announced Yang Li as creative director; the brand unveiled a refreshed logo the same day designed by Yang Li with theseus chan, and his debut was staged at Paris Fashion Week on 4 October 2021.

Li’s appointment came amid a new ownership chapter for the house: Exor, chaired by John Elkann, invested around €80 million in December 2020 to become majority shareholder, while Hermès remained a shareholder in the new luxury brand

Working across Shang Xia’s broader lifestyle scope—ready-to-wear, leather goods, furniture and tea culture—Li’s remit extended to brand identity and spatial design. Under his directorship the label set up a design studio in Paris to complement its Shanghai base, and during his tenure Shang Xia Yang Li selected & collaborated with architect John Pawson on stores and a tea-house style café in China.

Commentary in the fashion press characterised Li’s direction as modernising Shang Xia’s codes and widening its appeal to younger consumers.

== Automatic show ==
In 2018 Li debuted the "automatic show", ceding control of the FW19 visual presentation to his models.

Li says that he was inspired by the disjointed prose of American writer William S. Burroughs, who was known for championing an unconscious and "automatic" style of writing in his work. resulting in the following YANG LI AUTOMATIC MANIFESTO

smash the control images
smash the control machine
proclaim a new era
set a new calendar
nothing is true
everything is permitted
i strive to live up to my words..
out of control..

Li said:

We live in an era in which control over one’s image is everything, and this is especially true for fashion ... I wanted to cede this control exactly at the most intimate moment of look-book creation, to reverse this model, in order to create a more relevant and authentic method of storytelling.

The show was critically acclaimed and received overwhelming attention across the industry, models.com citing it as one of the coolest show of the season

The following year in 2019, Li extended his exploration of formats with a 3D virtual meets live show in collaboration with The Jesus and Mary Chain. Yang Li presented his collection titled Greatest Hits: Automatic Show II at La Gaîté Lyrique. The show was a part concert, part visual experience through the digital projections which featured a 3D scanned version of Ruby Aldridge and Wolf Gillespie who modelled the collection in a virtual video game like environment, mirrored in a 360 view across the venue in collaboration with SHOWstudio and AGUSTA YR, the show also featured a live performance by The Jesus and Mary Chain.

Li's work has attracted a number of highly influential stockists, including SSENSE, Farfetch, Dover Street Market, and LUISAVIAROMA.
