= Gross asset value =

Sum of value of property a company owns

The Gross Asset Value (GAV) is the sum of value of property a company owns.

Besides the net asset value, the GAV is a common KPI for property funds to measure the success of the fund manager.

== See also ==
- Net asset value
