= 1843 (magazine) =

British cultural magazine

- Editor: Rosie Blau
- Categories: Culture, Lifestyle
- Frequency: Bi-monthly (2007–2020); Digital (since 2020)
- Publisher: The Economist Newspaper Limited
- First issue: September 2007
- Company: Economist Group
- Country: United Kingdom
- Based in: London
- Language: English
- Website: economist.com/1843
- ISSN: 2397-2238

1843 (formerly Intelligent Life) is a digital magazine published by The Economist which features longform narrative journalism as well as shorter reads and columns. Named after the year The Economist was founded, 1843 offers a complementary perspective to its sister publication, focusing more on narrative, rather than analysis. Like The Economist, 1843 is based in London and has a global readership. Like the newspaper, the magazine is owned by the Economist Group, a British media holding company.

== History ==
The magazine was launched under the title Intelligent Life in September 2007 as a quarterly publication, having previously been a summer annual and was billed as covering "the arts, style, food, wine, cars, travel and anything else under the sun, as long as it's interesting."

In March 2016, the Economist Group relaunched and rebranded Intelligent Life as 1843 (named for The Economist's founding year).

1843 magazine features contributions from The Economist's journalists, as well as writers and photographers from around the world. It is edited by Rosie Blau. It is seen as akin to The Wall Street Journal's WSJ. and the Financial Times' FT Magazine.

It has won awards for its journalism from the British Society of Magazine Editors, the Association of Illustrators, British Journalism Awards, the Foreign Press Association Media Awards, the Migration Media Awards, Fortnum & Mason Food and Drink Awards and the Travel Media Awards.

In May 2020 it was announced that 1843 would move to a digital-only format.
