= Suzanne Heywood =

British businesswoman and civil servant (born 1969)

The Right Honourable The Lady Heywood of Whitehall CBE
- Born: Suzanne Elizabeth Cook; 25 February 1969 (age 57); Southampton, Hampshire, England
- Education: Somerville College, Oxford; King's College, Cambridge
- Occupation: Business executive
- Spouse: Jeremy Heywood (m. 1997; died 2018)
- Children: 3
- Website: suzanneheywood.com

Suzanne Elizabeth Heywood, Baroness Heywood of Whitehall, CBE (née Cook; born 25 February 1969), is a British executive and former civil servant. She has been the chief operating officer of the Exor Group since 2022 and the chair of CNH Industrial since 2018. She is also the chair of Iveco.

Having sailed around the world with her family as a child for a decade, she studied at Somerville College, Oxford and King's College, Cambridge. Her early career was spent as a civil servant in HM Treasury. She then joined McKinsey & Company, where she rose to become a senior partner before leaving for Exor in 2016.

In the 2024 Birthday Honours, Suzanne Heywood was appointed a Commander of the Order of the British Empire (CBE) for services to business leadership.

== Early life and education ==
Suzanne Cook was born on 25 February 1969 in Southampton, England, to teachers Gordon Cook and Mary, née Brindley. Having sold the family house and a family-owned hotel, and initially sponsored by a hotel group, from 1976 to 1986 the Cooks sailed around the world in a schooner called Wavewalker, retracing initially the third and final voyage of the eighteenth-century explorer and cartographer Captain Cook (to whom they were not related despite the shared surname). Although three years were planned for the sailing, they ended up spending a decade doing so. In 1977, the ship was almost destroyed in a storm between Africa and Australia. Cook was below deck and received a serious head injury eventually requiring seven surgeries, but the rest of her family and crew received only minor injuries; her father had been the only one on deck and was thrown overboard but was saved by his lifeline.

Of her upbringing, Heywood has remarked "kindness and warmth... were so absent in my childhood"; she has not been in contact with her father since 2019 owing to his objections to her writing her memoir, her mother, with whom she had a very strained relationship, died in 2016, and "she has not spoken to her brother for some time", he, having been the "favoured child" and not academically inclined, not having experienced the same deprivations as Heywood. She notes her father's motivation for undertaking the sailing voyage as a desire to be "heroic", observing also his "quite aggressive" nature, and recounts her mother's cold behaviour: "she wouldn’t speak to me, or would refer to me as “her” in front of me. She really disliked me and favoured my brother." Prior to her death, Heywood's mother typed a letter, found later by her daughter, in which she "threatened that if I went ahead with the book, she would write nasty things about me and Jeremy, and try to ruin his career. She also said that I was educationally poor. It was horrible, horrible but helpful– and it set me free".

Having been denied the opportunity to settle at a boarding school to enjoy the education she craved- and for requesting which she was berated for selfishness by her parents- Cook undertook her secondary education through the Queensland Correspondence School, doing both the Junior Certificate and the Senior Certificate.

The family arrived in New Zealand when Cook was 15, and Cook was left with her younger brother to live in a small holiday house at the isolated Lake Rotoiti. A year later, she returned to England alone and matriculated into Somerville College, Oxford in 1987 to study zoology. Her college tutor was Marian Dawkins. She graduated from Oxford with a Bachelor of Arts (BA) degree in 1990. She then moved to the University of Cambridge, King's College, Cambridge, to undertake postgraduate studies. She completed her Doctor of Philosophy (PhD) degree in 1993: her thesis was titled "Filial imprinting in chicks: processes and stimulus representations".

== Career ==
In 1993, Heywood joined Her Majesty's Treasury as a fast stream trainee. In 1995, after two years of training, she was appointed private secretary to the Financial Secretary to the Treasury. From 1996 to 1997 she was a Grade 7 civil servant.

In 1997, Heywood left the civil service and moved into the private sector, joining McKinsey & Company as an associate. She became a partner in 2007. She was made director (senior partner) in 2013 when she was appointed Global Head of the Organisation Design Service Line. She left McKinsey & Company in 2016 to join the Exor Group as managing director; in November 2022 she was appointed Chief Operating Officer. Additionally, she has been chair of CNH Industrial since July 2018, and served as interim CEO of CNH Industrial from March 2020 to January 2021, following the resignation of Hubertus Mühlhäuser. As Deputy Chair of Trustees she became Acting Chair of the Royal Opera House from December 2019 until July 2020. Heywood is also on the board of the Covent Garden Foundation, Chanel Ltd., The Economist Group Ltd. and the Royal Academy of Music.

== Personal life ==
In 1997, the then Suzanne Cook married Jeremy Heywood. Jeremy was a senior civil servant, who was Cabinet Secretary and Head of the Home Civil Service until shortly before his death in 2018. Together they had three children, including twins.

In 2017, Heywood wrote a biography of her mother-in-law, the archaeologist Brenda Swinbank.

In 2021, Heywood spoke out in defence of her late husband, following criticisms made in Nigel Boardman's review of the Lex Greensill affair.

In 2023, Heywood published Wavewalker: Breaking Free, a memoir of her childhood at sea and her efforts to educate herself in order to escape back to a more normal life.

== Selected works ==
- Heywood, Suzanne (2023). Wavewalker: Breaking Free. HarperCollins. ISBN 9780008498498.
- Heywood, Suzanne (2021). What Does Jeremy Think?: Jeremy Heywood and the Making of Modern Britain. HarperCollins. ISBN 9780008353124.
- Heywood, Suzanne (2017). Recollections of a Female Archaeologist: A Life of Brenda Swinbank. Blurb Publishing. ISBN 978-1389025303.
- Heidari-Robinson, Stephen; Heywood, Suzanne (2016). ReOrg: How to Get It Right. Boston, MA: Harvard Business Review Press. ISBN 978-1633692237.

Orders of precedence in the United Kingdom
Preceded by The Baroness Bull	Ladies	Succeeded by The Baroness Osamor
