= Michael Layton =

Michael Layton may refer to:

- Mike Layton (born 1978), Toronto city councillor
- Mike Layton (journalist) (1922–2011), American newspaper journalist
- Michael Layton, 2nd Baron Layton (1912–1989), British businessman
