= IDS Executive Compensation Review =

- Discipline: Pay Benchmarking
- Language: English
- Edited by: Steve Tatton

Publication details
- History: 1981–present
- Publisher: Incomes Data Services (United Kingdom)
- Frequency: Monthly journal, annual reports and services

Standard abbreviations
- ISO 4: IDS Exec. Compens. Rev.

Indexing
- ISSN: 1746-1847

Links
- Journal homepage

IDS Executive Compensation Review (ECR) is journal which has been reporting on all aspects of pay and practice for managers and professionals since 1981. ECR provides guidance on market trends for specific job functions, new ideas in reward strategy, and the latest benchmarking data for those higher up the managerial ladder. The journal is known for its research into directors’ pay in both the public and private sectors, as well as its findings on the latest bonus payments for managers and professionals. The service is used by HR professionals, consultants, trade unions, government and the media.

IDS Executive Compensation Review is published by Incomes Data Services, an independent research organisation providing information and analysis on pay, conditions, pensions, employment law and HR policy practice in the UK and Europe.

== Online services ==
Journal content is available as the Executive Compensation module of ids.thomsonreuters.com. ECR also provides data to www.IDSPay.co.uk where pay data can be used to create bespoke reports.

== Pay sector reports ==
The IDS Executive Compensation Research team is also responsible for compiling the annual Directors' Pay Report, Pay and Progression for Graduates, and the NHS Boardroom Pay Report.

== History ==
IDS’s Executive Compensation Review was launched in 1981 as a sister journal to IDS Pay Report. It was first named the Top Pay Unit, then the Management Pay Review, until it was re-launched as the Executive Compensation Review in January 2003.
