= Fráňa Zemínová =

Czechoslovak women's rights activist and politician (1882–1962)

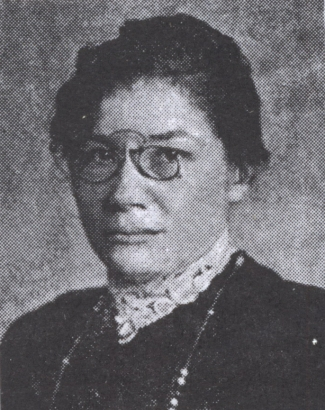

Member of the Constituent National Assembly
- In office 1946–1948

Member of the Interim National Assembly
- In office 1945–1946

Member of the Chamber of Deputies
- In office 1920–1939

Personal details
- Born: 15 August 1882; Dolní Chvatliny, Austria-Hungary
- Died: 26 September 1962 (aged 80); Velichovky, Czechoslovakia

Františka "Fráňa" Zeminová (15 August 1882 – 26 September 1962) was a Czechoslovak women's rights activist and politician. In 1920 she was elected to the Chamber of Deputies of Czechoslovakia, becoming one of the first group of female parliamentarians in the country. She remained a member of parliament until 1948, after which she was jailed by the communist authorities.

== Biography ==
Zeminová was born in Dolní Chvatliny, then in Austria-Hungary, in 1882, the youngest of twelve children of a farming couple. She graduated from business school and from the age of 20 until 1918 worked as an accountant and saleswoman in the Prague publishing house I. L. Kober. She had been active in the Czech National Social Party since 1897, but was unable to join until 1912. In 1905, together with Františka Plamínková, she was a co-founder of the Committee on Women's Suffrage and several other women's associations. Her participation in demonstrations brought her to the attention of the Austrian police, and she spent a short time in jail for 'anti-state activities'. She was also involved in the trade union movement and had articles published in the Ženské snahy monthly magazine and České slovo daily newspaper.

In 1918 she became a member of the Revolutionary National Assembly for the National Socials. Following the formation of Czechoslovakia, she was a candidate in the 1920 parliamentary elections, and was elected to the Chamber of Deputies. She was re-elected in 1925, 1929 and 1935 serving until 1939. In February 1937 Dorothy Layton, Eleanor Rathbone and Katharine Stewart-Murray, Duchess of Atholl made a tour of Romania, Czechoslovakia and Yugoslavia. They were received by Zeminová in Prague, who used the occasion to laud the support of Britain for her country during the events that were to lead up to Germany's invasion.

Following the occupation of parts of Czechoslovakia by Germany and Hungary in 1939, she became a member of the Party of National Unity. After World War II she served in the Interim National Assembly from 1945 to 1946 and was then elected to the Constituent National Assembly, serving until the 1948 elections.

Following the 1948 coup, she was arrested in 1949 and sentenced to 20 years in jail. She spent eleven years in prisons in Prague, Jihlava and Plzeň working as a seamstress, before being pardoned by President Antonín Novotný as part of a large amnesty in 1960. During her time in prison she had organised hunger strikes, and suffered two heart attacks. After being released, she remained under the supervision of the StB until her death in Velichovky in 1962. She was posthumously awarded the Order of Tomáš Garrigue Masaryk in 1992.
