= Bavor Rodovský mladší of Hustířany =

Bavor Rodovský mladší of Hustířany (around 1526 in Hustířany – 1591/92 or 1600 in Budyně nad Ohří) was a nobleman and alchemist from Bohemia.

Bavor Rodovský mladší was born into the Rodovský of Hustířany noble family to Jan Rodovský of Hustiřany and his wife Anna Šelndorfská of Hornšperk. He was named in honor of his grandfather, the elder Bavor Rodovský.

The family was too poor to send Rodovský mladší to university, and he had to study on his own. Among other things, he taught himself German, Latin, mathematics, astronomy, philosophy, and in particular, alchemy.

In 1566, Rodovský mladší married Voršila of Šelndorf. With her dowry he was able to purchase an estate in Radostov, but was later forced to sell it to settle his debts. The family then moved to Prague. There Rodovský mladší again fell into debt, at which point his wife left him, taking their only son, Jan. From 1573 Rodovský mladší worked with alchemists like William of Rosenberg, and Zbyněk Zajíc of Hazmburk, and also found work in the alchemical laboratories of Emperor Rudolf II. One of his alchemical manuscripts survives as part of the Vossiani Chymici collection at the Leiden University Library.

== Works ==
- Smaragdová deska (1591), a Czech translation of the Tabula Smaragdina attributed to Hermes Trismegistus
- Alchimie česká
- Kniha o dokonalém umění chymickém
- Vo Hermesově filosofii, tj. vo požehnaném kameni filosofické
- Řeči filosofické o kameni filosofickém
- Secreta Aristotelis aneb Kniha lidských cností a mnohých naučení, kterak se králové, knížata i páni v svém panování mají opatrovati
- Kuchařství, to jest knížka o rozličných krmích, kterak se užitečně s chutí strojiti mají (1591); one of the oldest Czech cookbooks.

== Bibliography ==
- Karpenko, Vladimír. "Bohemian Nobility and Alchemy in the Second Half of the Sixteenth Century: Wilhelm of Rosenberg and Two Alchemists." Cauda Pavonis 15, no. 2 (1996): 14–18.
- Krumlowský, Felix. Jména z českých dějin, která byste měli znát II. Pavel Dobrovský – Beta, 2008. ISBN 978-80-7306-343-6
- Nummedal, Tara. Alchemy and Authority in the Holy Roman Empire. Chicago: University of Chicago Press, 2007, esp. 22–23.
- Zachar, Otakar. "Z dějin alchymie v Čechách. I. Bavor mladši Rodovský z Hustiřan, alchymista český." Časopis Musea Kralovstí Českého 21–22 (1899–1900): 157–63.
