= IDS HR in Practice =

- Discipline: HR
- Language: English
- Edited by: John Robertson

Publication details
- History: 1971 – present
- Publisher: Incomes Data Services Ltd (United Kingdom)

Standard abbreviations
- ISO 4: IDS HR Pract.

Indexing
- ISSN: 0308-9339

Links
- Journal homepage

IDS HR in Practice is a subscription-based online service offering analysis and coverage of best practice in all major areas of HR. It features named case studies and benchmarking data on a wide range of employee benefits and allowances. The HR module of IDS Thomson Reuters, the service was launched in 2012 and is the successor to the fortnightly journal IDS HR Studies. A subscription to IDS HR in Practice includes access to the content of IDS HR Studies back to 2003.

IDS HR in Practice is published by Incomes Data Services, a subsidiary of Sweet & Maxwell which is itself owned by Thomson Reuters.

The service is used by companies, trade unions, consultants and other employment-related organisations.

== Best practice case studies ==
IDS HR in Practice provides analysis and named company case studies of best practice on all major HR topics, including:

- Absence management
- Alcohol and drugs policies
- Assessment centres
- Coaching and mentoring
- Corporate social responsibility
- Discipline, grievance and mediation
- e-HR
- e-learning
- Employee assistance programmes
- Employee engagement
- Employee health and well-being
- Employer branding
- Flexible benefits
- Flexible working
- Improving staff retention
- Internet and e-mail policies
- Job evaluation
- Job families
- Leadership development
- Managing redundancy
- Performance management
- Succession planning
- Talent management
- Total reward
- Training strategies
- Work-life balance

== Benchmarking data ==
IDS HR in Practice includes benchmarking data on a wide range of employee benefits and allowances, including:

- Annual hours
- Bonus schemes
- Employee share schemes
- Flexitime schemes
- Hours and holidays
- London allowances
- Overtime
- Shift pay
- Sick pay
- Standby and call-out pay

== In the press ==
- What is your redundancy cheque worth? - 10 July 2008
- HR departments have survived the recession with relatively few job cuts – 14 December 2009
