= Sue Gee =

British writer

- Born: 1947 (age 78–79)
- Occupation: Novelist
- Spouse: Marek Mayer (2003–2005)
- Children: 1
- Writing career
- Language: English
- Period: 1980–present
- Genre: Literary fiction

Sue Gee (born 1947) is a British novelist. She is published by Headline Review and by Salt. The Hours of the Night was the controversial winner of the Romantic Novel of the Year award in 1997. The Mysteries of Glass was long listed for the Orange Prize for Fiction in 2005.

== Biography ==
=== Personal life ===
Sue Gee's parents met and married in India in 1946 and returned to Britain in 1947, with the coming of independence to India. She and her brother David grew up on a Devon farm and in a Leicestershire village, before the family moved to Surrey in 1957. She lived for 27 years with the environmental journalist Marek Mayer: they married in 2003, two years before his death. Their son is Jamie Mayer. Sue Gee lives in London and Herefordshire.

=== Background and career ===
She was educated at the University of London, Goldsmiths College and at Middlesex University, where between 2000 and 2008 she was programme leader on the MA Creative Writing course and established The North London Literary Festival. She currently teaches at the Faber Academy, and is a mentor on the Write to Life programme at Freedom from Torture.

Her first novel, Spring Will Be Ours, was inspired by Marek Mayer's Polish background. It delineates the period 1939–1981 – from the Invasion of Poland (1939) at the start of World War II to the period of Solidarity and martial law (1981–1983). Its title comes from graffiti scrawled on the walls of Warsaw in 1981: Winter is yours, but spring will be ours. Later novels are both historical and contemporary. The success of her novel The Hours of the Night in 1995 attracted criticism from Barbara Cartland and others because it included a love affair between a gay couple.

She is also the author of many short stories, and of a Radio 4 drama, Ancient & Modern, broadcast in 2004 with Juliet Stevenson in the lead role.

== Bibliography ==
- Spring Will Be Ours (1988)
- Keeping Secrets (1991)
- The Last Guests of the Season (1993)
- Letters from Prague (1994)
- The Hours of the Night (1996)
- Earth & Heaven (2000)
- The Mysteries of Glass (2004)
- Reading in Bed (2007)
- Last Fling – short stories (2011)
- Coming Home (2013)
- Trio (2016)

Dramatic works

- Ancient & Modern (2004)
