= IDS Pay Report =

- Discipline: Pay and Reward
- Language: English
- Edited by: Ken Mulkearn

Publication details
- History: 1966 – present
- Publisher: Incomes Data Services (United Kingdom)
- Frequency: Monthly

Standard abbreviations
- ISO 4: IDS Pay Rep.

Indexing
- ISSN: 0019-3461

Links
- Journal homepage

IDS Pay Report was a monthly journal providing research and analysis on pay and benefits across the UK economy. Ken Mulkearn, its last editor now edits Pay Climate a quarterly journal available from Incomes Data Research.

IDS Pay Report provided analysis of new reward systems and policy initiatives affecting HR practitioners. Detailed case studies cover topics including changes in pay progression, grading structures, work patterns and working time arrangements and total reward.

Described as ‘essential reading’ in the Financial Times and widely quoted in the media, the regular updates provide news of all the latest pay and labour market developments and details of pay settlements and trends in pay bargaining.

The journal and online services supply the latest figures on earnings, inflation, employment and unemployment. The reasons behind movements in average earnings and inflation are reported and analysed in the context of the changing labour market.

IDS Pay Report is published by Incomes Data Services an independent research organisation providing information and analysis on pay, conditions, pensions, employment law and HR policy practice in the UK and Europe.

== Online services ==
Journal content is available as the Pay & Reward module of ids.thomsonreuters.com. IDS Pay Report also provides data to www.IDSPay.co.uk where pay data can be used to create bespoke reports.

== Pay sector reports ==
IDS Pay Report conducts annual salary surveys to provide detailed pay data and analysis across a variety of industry sectors, including the following:

- Pay and Conditions in Engineering
- Pay and Conditions in Call and Contact Centres
- Pay and Conditions in Housing and Social Care
- Pay and Conditions in Retail
- Pay in Road Transport and Distribution
- Pay and Benefits in the Public Services
- Pay in IT and e-commerce

== History ==
Incomes Data Services was founded in 1966 by David Layton, who amongst other activities, had been an Industrial Relations Manager at the old National Coal Board. The very first publication was published in 1966 as ‘Incomes Data Report’, which later became ‘IDS Report’ and later still, ‘IDS Pay Report’. Running for over 40 years, IDS Pay Report celebrated its 1,000th issue in May 2008.

IDS was acquired by the global legal publishing company Thomson in September 2005, which became Thomson Reuters in April 2008.
