= IDS Employment Law Brief =

- Discipline: Law
- Language: English
- Edited by: Annabel Rutherford

Publication details
- History: 1971 – present
- Publisher: Incomes Data Services (United Kingdom)
- Frequency: Semi-monthly

Standard abbreviations
- ISO 4: IDS Employ. Law Br.

Indexing
- ISSN: 1748-2828

Links
- Journal homepage

IDS Employment Law Brief (also known as IDS Brief) is a twice-monthly journal that has been reporting on and explaining new employment legislation and cases since 1971. IDS Brief provides comment on employment law for legal and HR professionals, covering key cases in the courts and tribunals, and assessing the practical implications for organisations.

Written by an in-house team of employment lawyers the journal is accompanied by IDS Employment Law Handbooks and Guides (previously named Supplements) and the online service - www.idsbrief.com

IDS Brief Handbooks have recently been launched on Westlaw UK.

IDS Brief case reports are often cited as references in other works.

IDS Employment Law Brief is published by Incomes Data Services, a research organisation providing information and analysis on pay and conditions, pensions, employment law and HR policy and practice in the UK and Europe.

== History ==
IDS Employment Law Brief was launched as IDS Brief in 1971 to explain the complexities of the Industrial relations Act 1971, which had introduced the right not to be unfairly dismissed as well as a tortuous legal code to govern the activities of trade unions.

IDS Employment Law Brief celebrated its 900th issue in May 2010.
