= Walter Layton, 1st Baron Layton =

British politician (1884–1966)

Layton in 1932

Walter Thomas Layton, 1st Baron Layton CH CBE (15 March 1884 – 14 February 1966), was a British economist, editor, newspaper proprietor and Liberal Party politician.

== Background and education ==
Layton was the son of Alfred John Layton of Woking, Surrey, and Mary Johnson. He was educated at King's College School, Westminster City School, University College, London and Trinity College, Cambridge.

== Career ==
He became a lecturer in economics at Trinity College, Cambridge in 1908, then from 1909 to 1914 he was a Fellow of Gonville and Caius College. A notable economist, Layton worked for the Ministry of Munitions during the First World War, then at the fledgling Economic and Financial Organization of the League of Nations. In 1922 he was appointed editor of The Economist, a post he held until 1938, and from 1944 to 1963 was also Chairman of The Economist Newspaper Ltd. His editorship was of profound importance to the newspaper, and he was probably the person to whom it owes most thanks for its survival and continued independence. He was editorial director of the News Chronicle (1930–40), and returned to the Chronicle after the war, where he remained until the newspaper ceased publication in 1960.

He was a member of the Liberal Party committee that produced Britain's Industrial Future, otherwise known as the Liberal Yellow Book. Layton was again drafted in to work for the government during the Second World War, holding positions in the Ministry of Supply (from May 1940) and the Ministry of Production. Head of Joint War Production Staff 1942 to 1943. After the war, he served as Vice-President of the Parliamentary Assembly of the Council of Europe from 1949 to 1957.

== Honours ==
Layton was made a CBE in 1917 and a Member of the Order of the Companions of Honour in 1919. He was knighted in 1930 and in 1947 he was raised to the peerage as Baron Layton, of Danehill in the County of Sussex.

== Liberal politics ==
Layton stood unsuccessfully for parliament three times as a Liberal. He fought Burnley in 1922, Cardiff South in 1923 and in 1929 he switched again to fight the London University seat. However, Layton's importance in Liberal politics had much more to do with his work at the News Chronicle and The Economist where he became a prominent member of a group of Liberals who had a major influence on public opinion. Their orbits were the Whitehall and Westminster villages. They moved in Fleet Street, the City, and Oxbridge circles. Among their contemporaries were Maynard Keynes, William Beveridge, Gilbert Murray, and Seebohm Rowntree. Layton would later chair the executive committee of the Liberal Industrial Inquiry which produced the celebrated Yellow Book of 1928.

== Marriage and children ==
Lord Layton married Eleanor Dorothea Osmaston, daughter of Eleanor Margaret and Francis Beresford Plumptre Osmaston, in 1910. They had seven children:

- The Hon. Margaret Dorothea Layton MA (13 March 1911 – 5 July 1962), married Alfred Geiringer (1911-1996) of Reuters, four children
- Michael John Layton, 2nd Baron Layton (28 September 1912 – 23 January 1989), married Dorothy Rose Cross (1916-1994), two children
- Lt. Col. the Hon. David Layton MBE (5 July 1914 – 31 July 2009), educ. Gresham's School and Cambridge University, married (1) (Joan) Elizabeth Gray, three children; married (2) Joy Parkinson (d. 2013)
- The Hon. Jean Mary Layton (14 April 1916 – 8 July 2017), violinist and music therapist, 100th birthday marked by Classic FM in 2016, married Paul Eisler (d.1966), two children
- The Hon. Olive Shirley Layton (18 December 1918 – 22 June 2009), actress, married Peter Gellhorn, composer and conductor (1912-2004), four children
- The Hon. (Elizabeth) Ruth Frances Layton (27 April 1923 – 4 June 2016), served in ATS, married Edward Gutierrez Pegna (1919-2009), four children
- The Hon. Christopher Walter Layton (31 December 1929 – 12 March 2023), married (1) Anneliese Margaret von Thadden, two children; married (2) Margaret Ann Moon, three children; married (3) Wendy Elizabeth Christine Bartlett, one child

Layton died in February 1966, aged 81, and was succeeded in the barony by his eldest son.

Peerage of the United Kingdom
New creation	Baron Layton; 1947–1966	Succeeded by Michael John Layton
Media offices
Preceded by Hartley Withers	Editor of The Economist; 1922–1938	Succeeded by Geoffrey Crowther
