= Jedlina-Zdrój =

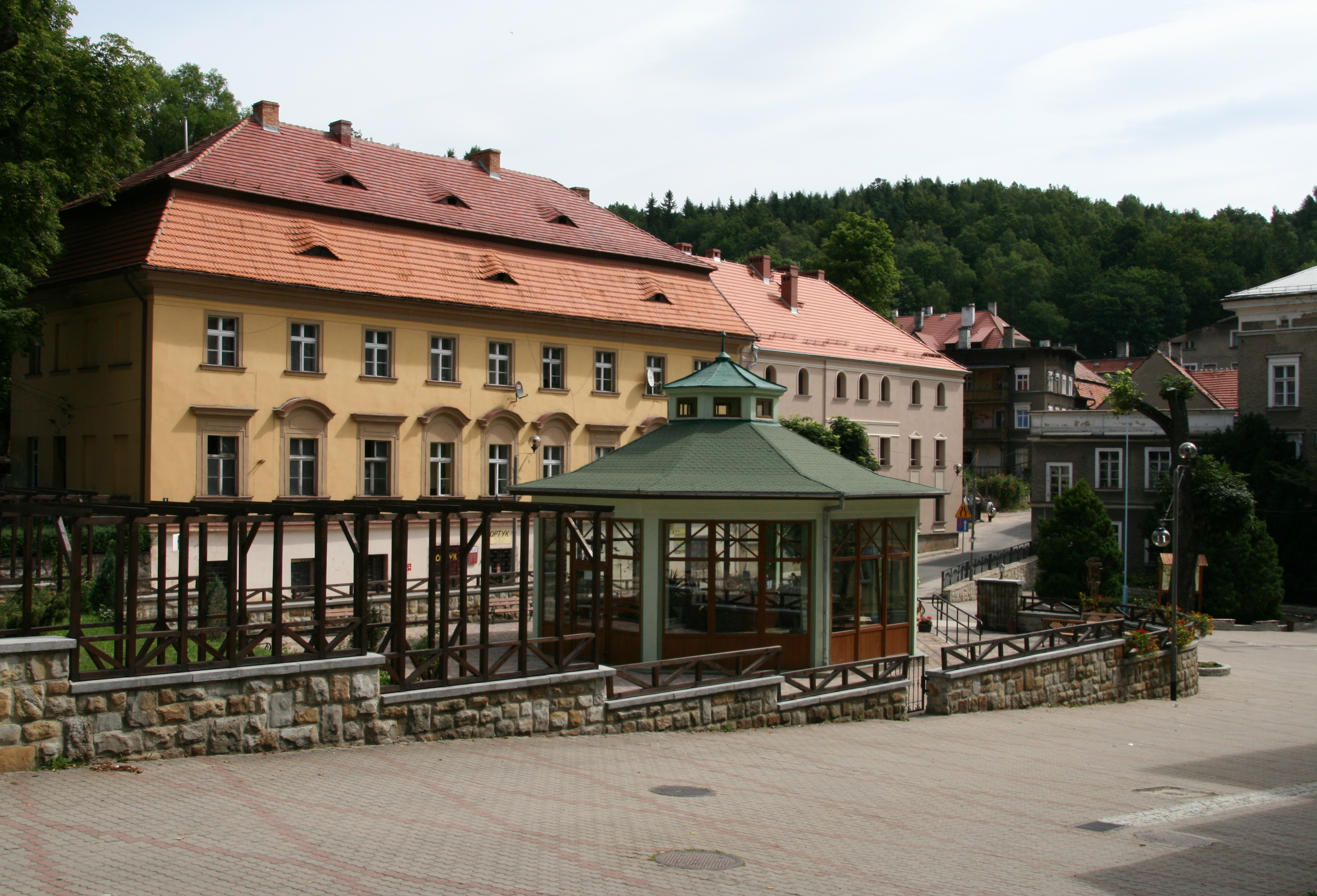
- Zdrojowy Square

- Flag Coat of arms

- Location within Poland
- Coordinates: 50°43′16″N 16°20′20″E
- Country: Poland
- Voivodeship: Lower Silesian
- County: Wałbrzych
- Gmina: Jedlina-Zdrój (urban gmina)
- Town rights: 1768

Area
  - Total: 17.45 km^{2} (6.74 sq mi)

Population (2019-06-30)
  - Total: 4,828
  - Density: 276.7/km^{2} (716.6/sq mi)
- Time zone: UTC+1 (CET)
  - Summer (DST): UTC+2 (CEST)
- Postal code: 58-330
- Area code: (+48) 74
- Vehicle registration: DBA
- Website: https://www.jedlinazdroj.eu

Jedlina-Zdrój [jɛdˈlʲina ˈzdrui̯] (German: Bad Charlottenbrunn) is a spa town in Wałbrzych County, Lower Silesian Voivodeship, in south-western Poland, in the historic region of Lower Silesia.

As of 2019, the town has a population of 4,828.

== History ==
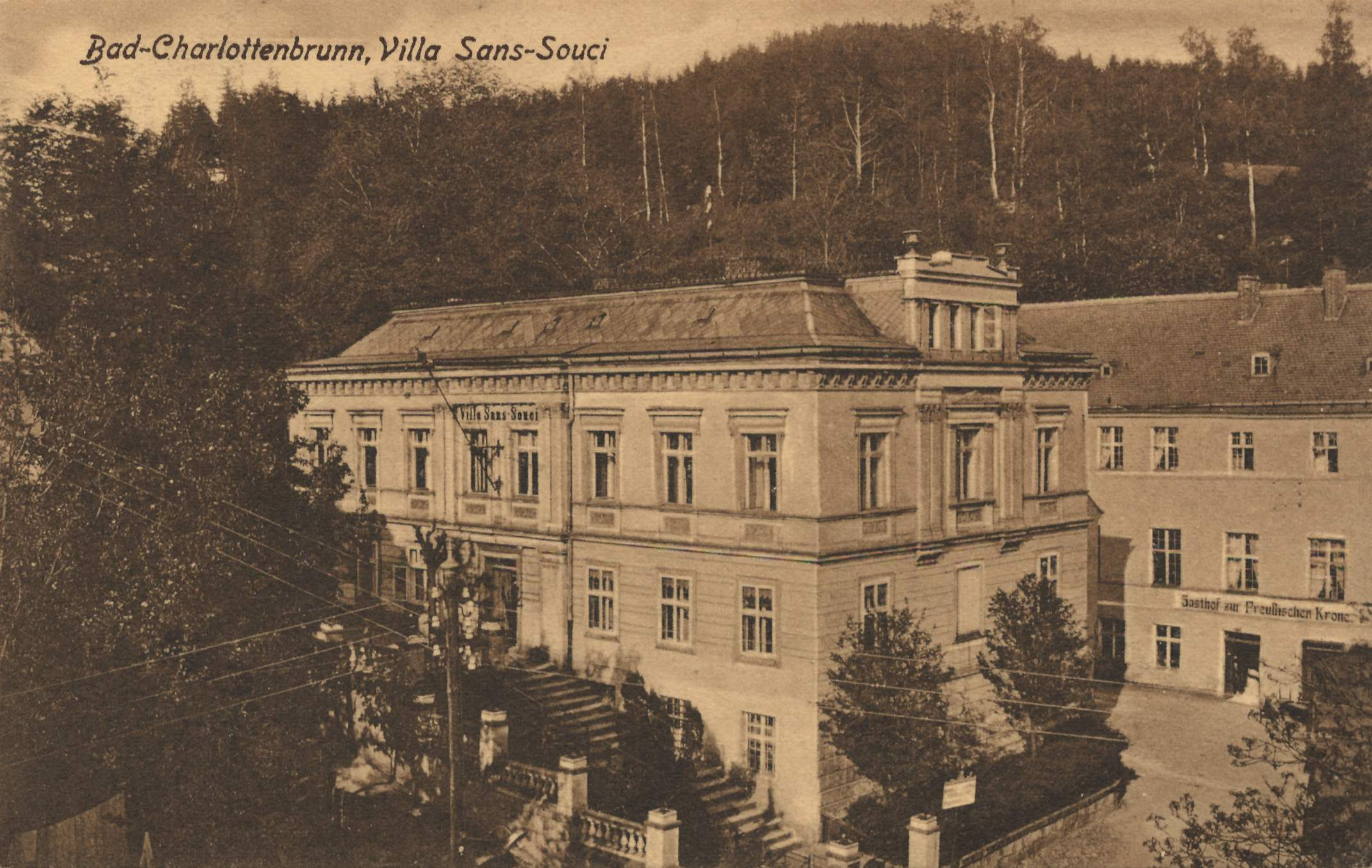
View of the town from around 1900

The oldest mention of Jedlinka dates back to the 13th century, to the reign of Duke Bolko I the Strict of the Polish Piast dynasty. It was a settlement of lumberjacks, and its name refers to the fir forests growing here. In the 18th century a mineral spa was founded in the Jedlinka estate. It was named Charlottenbrunn by its founder in honour of his wife Charlotte von Seherr-Thossa. In 1737 a spa house and other buildings were built. Later on, the village became a centre of textile trade. Four fairs a year took place here. In 1742 the settlement was annexed by the Kingdom of Prussia. In 1768 it was granted town rights. In the 19th century the spa town often changed its owners, which slowed its development. In the interwar period there were six hotels and about 30 pensions in the town. During World War II, in 1944, the Germans established a labor camp, which was a branch of the Gross-Rosen concentration camp, in the town. After Nazi Germany's defeat in World War II the region became once again part of Poland and the town was renamed Jedlina-Zdrój. The suffix "Zdrój" is typical for names of spa towns in Poland.

== Twin towns – sister cities ==
Jedlina-Zdrój is twinned with:

- Saint-Étienne-de-Crossey, France
- Strehla, Germany
- Velichovky, Czech Republic

== Gallery ==
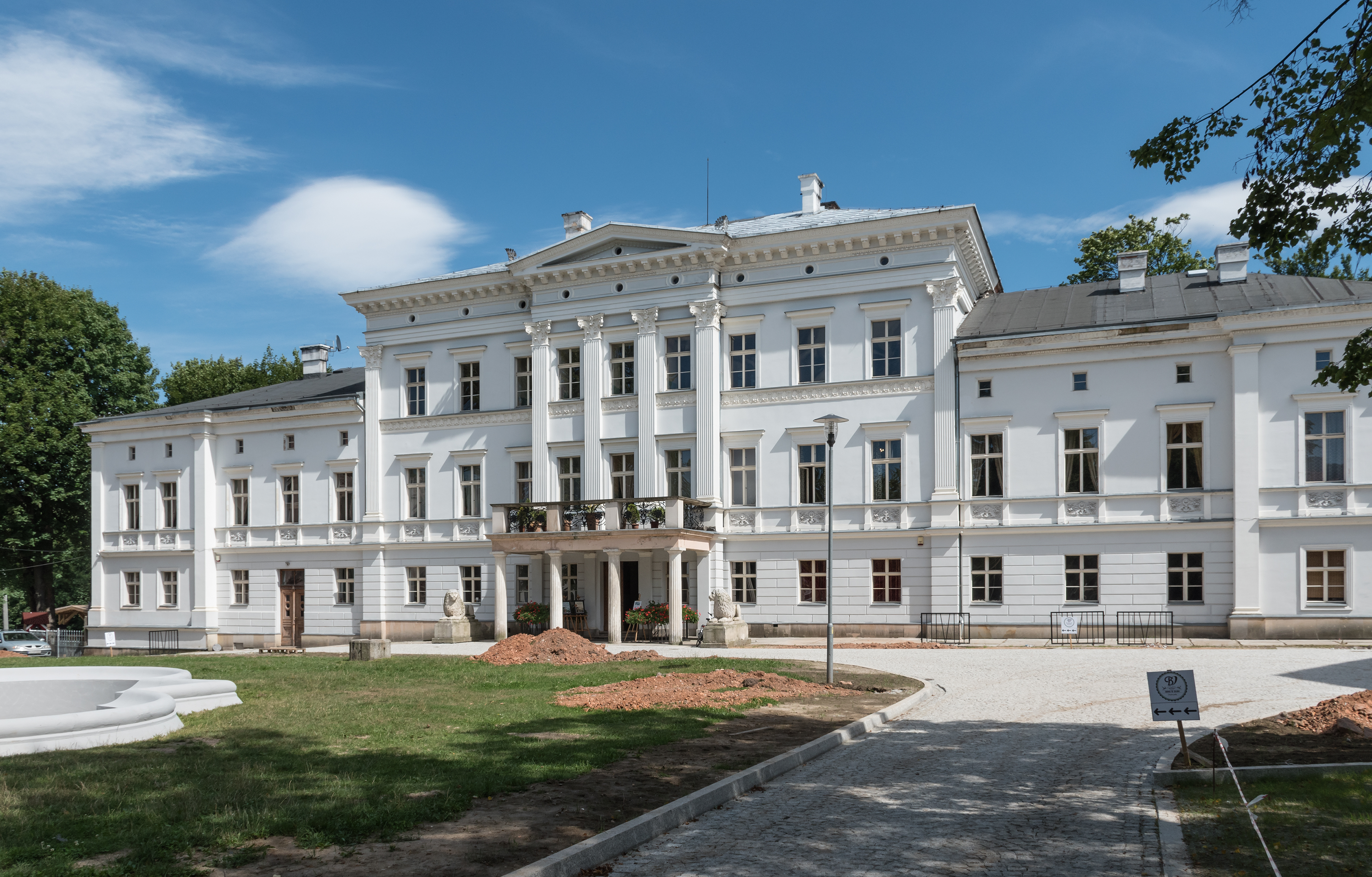
Jedlinka Palace

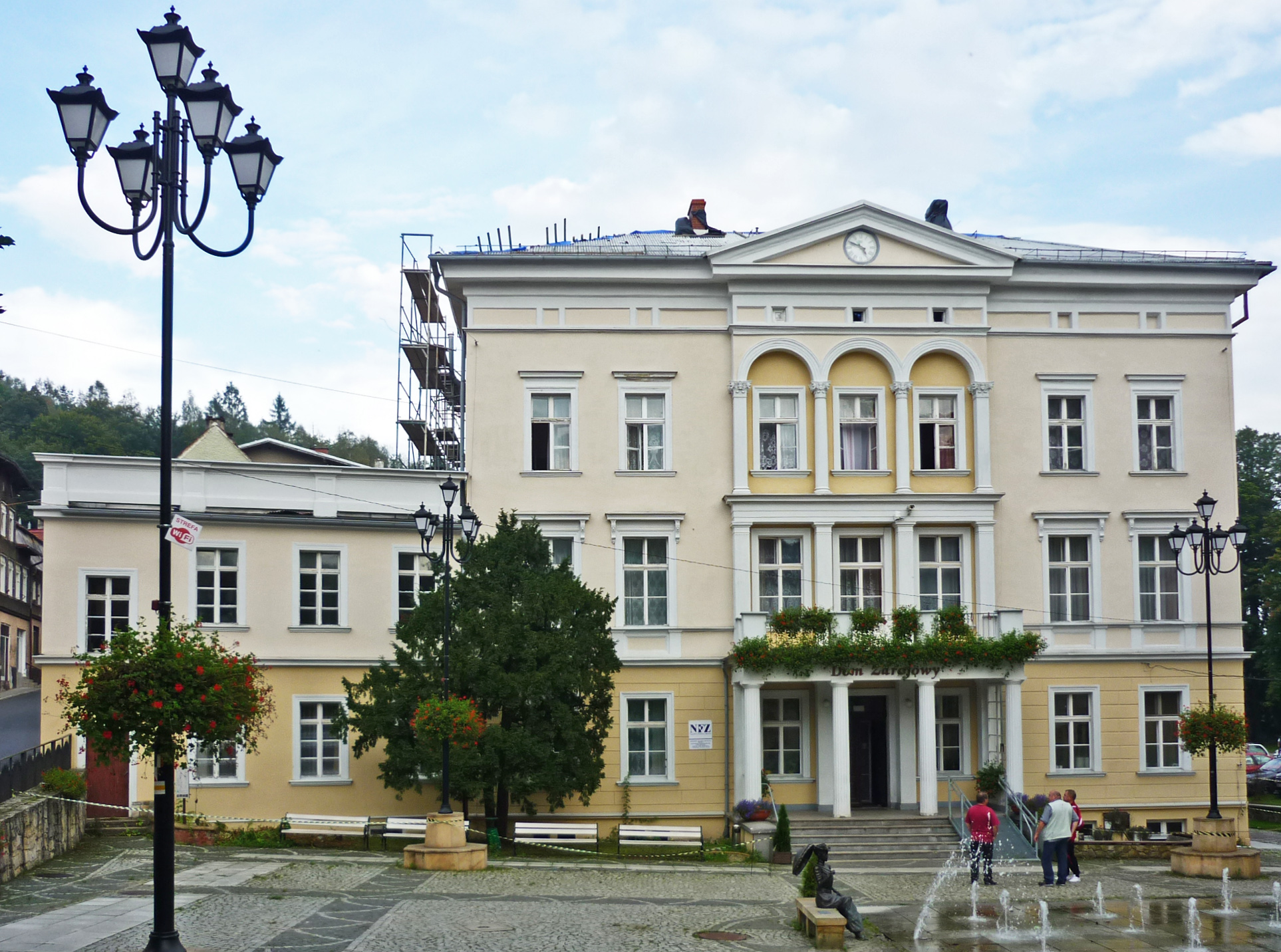
Spa house

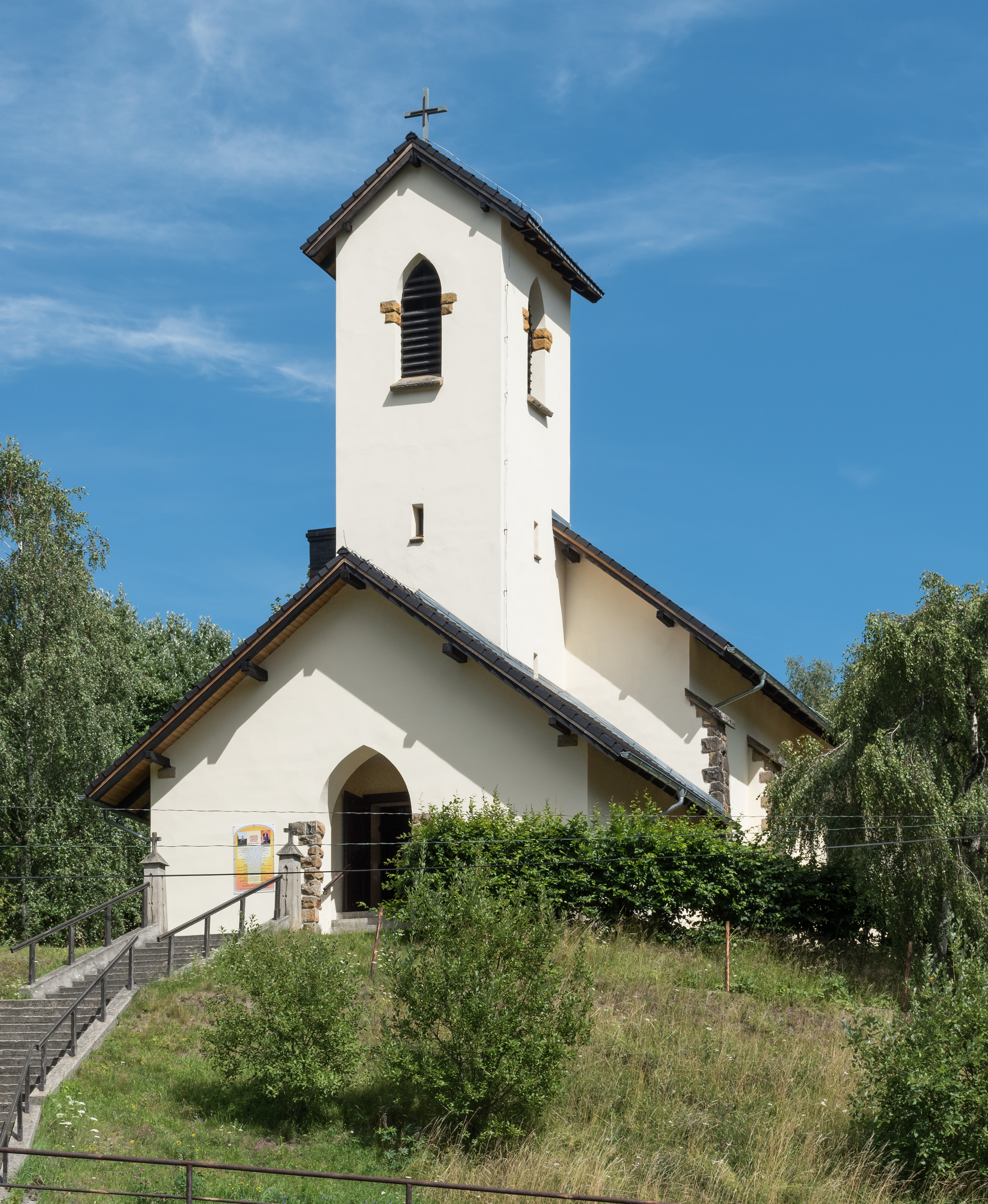
Church of the Assumption
