= Francis Hirst =

British journalist

Francis W. Hirst
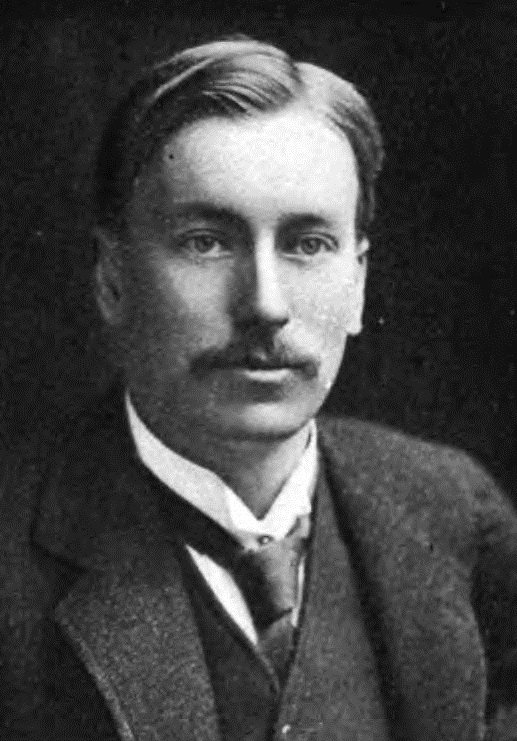
- Born: Francis Wrigley Hirst; 10 June 1873; Dalton Lodge, Huddersfield, England
- Died: 22 February 1953 (aged 79)

Francis Wrigley Hirst (10 June 1873 – 22 February 1953) was a British journalist, writer and editor of The Economist magazine. He was a Liberal in party terms and a classical liberal in ideology.

== Early life ==
Hirst was born at Dalton Lodge, two miles east of Huddersfield. He attended Clifton College and became editor of the Cliftonian. He went to Wadham College, Oxford, from 1892 to 1896, where he was Librarian and then President of the Oxford Union Society. He gained a First in Classical Moderations in 1894 and a First in Greats in 1896. At Wadham, and at the Oxford Union, he was a friend and contemporary of the future politicians John Simon and F. E. Smith, and of the athlete C.B. Fry.

== Liberal publicist ==
In the late 1890s Hirst decided to persuade his Oxford friends to write a volume of essays on Liberalism with him. The group wanted the preface to be written by a prominent Liberal, other than Lord Rosebery or Sir William Harcourt as these were the leaders of opposing factions. Their first preference was for John Morley but he declined on the grounds that he would be attacked for opinions expressed in the book which he did not hold. Hirst then asked H. H. Asquith who said the essays were likely intended to be "a declaration of war against that section of Liberal opinion, which has of recent years gravitated towards modes of thought and fashions of speech which are called 'Collectivist'". He further said that whilst he did not find himself in "substantial disagreement" with the essays he declined the offer because "exception might not unreasonably be taken to my going out of my way (as it would be said) to herald a militant demonstration, avowedly directed against a section (however small) of the party of which I am (for the time being) one of the responsible leaders". Hirst was "baffled" by this and then asked William Ewart Gladstone. Gladstone replied with a handwritten letter:

I am wholly unable to comply with the requests which so often reach me for the writing of Prefaces, but I venture on assuring you that I regard the design formed by you and your friends with sincere interest, and in particular wish well to all the efforts you may make on behalf of individual freedom and independence as opposed to what is termed Collectivism.

In the end Hirst and his friend J. S. Phillimore wrote the preface. The book was dedicated to Morley. After Morley read Hirst's contributions to Cassell's biography of Gladstone edited by Sir Wemyss Reid, he asked Hirst to spend a few weeks with him at Hawarden Castle (Gladstone's home) to help him write Gladstone's authorised biography. Hirst opposed the Boer War and was a co-founder of the League Against Aggression and Militarism.

After he had left Oxford, Hirst edited political and economic books for Harper's, including one on Toryism by F. E. Smith and one on Socialism by R. C. K. Ensor. Another was his compilation of extracts from Richard Cobden, John Bright, Joseph Hume, W. J. Fox, William Molesworth, Thomas Farrer and others, titled Free Trade and Other Fundamental Doctrines of the Manchester School. In 1904 Morley asked Hirst to write a biography of Adam Smith for his "English Men of Letters" series. During the next two years he wrote The Arbiter in Council, an imaginary dialogue in which the Arbiter, an old Cobdenite Radical, discusses the issues of war and peace. Morley recommended it to Macmillan and it was published anonymously but the authorship came to be known.

In 1903 he married Helena Mary Carroll Cobden at Heyshott, near Midhurst, West Sussex. She was born on 16 February 1880 in Japan. She died 27 December 1965 in Chichester, West Sussex. Helena was Richard Cobden's great-niece. Francis Hirst had a particular affection for the Cobden Club and the Dunford House Association. One of his homes was Dunford House, Midhurst, West Sussex – the former home of Richard Cobden – where he used to organise the "Dunford House Conferences". The Hirsts lived there until 1952.

Hirst wrote to the new Liberal Prime Minister, Sir Henry Campbell-Bannerman on 29 December 1905, claiming that depression in trade and social distress could be explained by over-taxation and wasteful government expenditure on armaments. The outcome of this was "dear money, lowered credit, less enterprise in business and manufacturers, reduced home demand and therefore reduced output to unemployment". He told Campbell-Bannerman that "to restore credit and to lower taxes is the first great remedy for unemployment and the first great mission of the Liberal government". Hirst wrote again to Campbell-Bannerman on 9 November 1907, claiming that his government would only regain popularity by pursuing the traditional policy of retrenchment in expenditure.

Morley also recommended Hirst as editor of The Economist, which he held from 1907 to 1916. In 1913–14 Hirst was a member of the international commission sent by the Carnegie Endowment for International Peace to investigate the conduct of the Balkan Wars of 1912–13. Hirst was with John Burns when Britain declared war on Germany in August 1914, and they both wept at the news. He was editor of the journal Common Sense from 1916 to 1921. Common Sense has been described as "the new house journal of disaffected Cobdenites". Hirst wrote that there was little to choose between the old Prime Minister Asquith and the new, Lloyd George; they both held power at the pleasure of protectionists. This "Old Gang of official Liberals" were impossible to rely upon because they had sacrificed liberalism in a "miserable hunt for offices and titles...in order to please their Protectionist colleagues and remain in office". Hirst agreed with Lord Lansdowne's proposal for a negotiated peace with Germany and drew up a government for this purpose. It did not include Asquithian Liberals but included old-fashioned Liberals such as Lord Loreburn and Richard Holt.

== Political activity ==
Hirst stood for Parliament as a Liberal in 1910 and 1929. Hirst campaigned against the post-war revival of protectionism under the guise of safeguarding. In 1927 he noted the Labour Party's opposition to tariffs but also doubted whether "any system of socialism is ultimately compatible with the policy of free imports and the open door". When the Liberal Walter Runciman, President of the Board of Trade, introduced the Abnormal Importations (Customs Duties) Act 1931 Hirst accused Runciman of pursuing a "Tariff of Abominations, the worst since Waterloo", with the Ottawa Agreement meaning that Britain's tariff policy was no longer under the control of the British Parliament but by the colonies. It was an inversion of George III's policy in regard to the American colonies: "It is now the turn of the Colonies to control the mother country's taxes!"

In June 1936 he was elected to serve on the Liberal Party Council. He spent several years in the late 1930s writing an enormous biography of the liberal statesman Percy Molteno but, though it was completed in May 1939, the outbreak of World War II prevented its publication.

After the war in 1946 Hirst published The Repeal of the Corn Laws in which he compared the privations of the 1940s to the "hungry forties" of the previous century. Two days after the centenary of Corn Law repeal the Labour government introduced bread rationing for the first time. In 1947 he published In the Golden Days, an autobiography which terminated in 1906. He noted that Samuel Smiles' "book on the virtues of thrift has been lost and obliterated in an age of borrowing and bankruptcy".

== Views ==
J. E. Allen called Hirst "a disciple of Adam Smith" who

"disliked indirect taxes, except a few on articles of general consumption which are not necessaries, such as tobacco, beer, spirits, and wine".

In his later years Hirst was

"more than doubtful about the value of the 'Welfare State', and of what he called 'The Beveridge Hoax'. He did not admit the right of Parliament to take money from one lot of citizens and give it to another lot; in fact he disliked the use of the Budget as an instrument for the redistribution of the national income. Borrowing by the Government or by local authorities seemed to him dangerous".

G. P. Gooch said of him that

"his horror of tariffs, huge armaments, and war was hardly greater than his detestation of the omnipotent State...he remained a 'Manchester' man to the end".

Hirst was a Cobdenite isolationist who disliked the balance of power theory and feared the League of Nations gave Britain obligations which might lead her into war. Roger Fulford has noted Hirst's hostility to

"'Mr. George' and the follies of his economic plans for curing unemployment".

Maurice Bowra described Hirst as believing

"the nation's finances were the most serious thing in its politics. He hated to see public extravagance...He thought the expense of war one of its most deadly characteristics. With him expenditure of public money was a moral activity which should be governed by the highest principles and never be prostituted to electoral or party needs. He believed firmly in private enterprise and had little affection for State control...one felt in the presence of a true disciple of Gladstone".

Another friend of Hirst's, A. F. Thompson, asserted that he was

"archetype of the stern and unbending Cobdenite...His denunciations of Keynes were particularly memorable".

== Publications ==
- (1897). Essays in Liberalism (part author).
  - 'Preface' (with J. S. Phillimore), pp. vii–xiii.
  - 'Liberalism and Wealth', pp. 31–96.
- (1898). 'Mr. Gladstone. I.', The Economic Journal, Vol. 8, No. 31, Sep., pp. 395–402.
- (1898). 'Mr. Gladstone II', The Economic Journal, Vol. 8, No. 32, Dec., pp. 533–543.
- (1899). The Life of William Ewart Gladstone (edited by Sir Wemyss Reid):
  - Chapter II: "Mr. Gladstone and the Oxford Union Society".
  - Chapter IV: "Mr. Gladstone as a Tory, 1832–1841".
  - Chapter VI: "Mr. Gladstone and the Reform of the Tariff, 1841–1846".
  - Chapter VIII: "Mr. Gladstone as a Peelite, 1846–1859".
  - Chapter IX: "Mr. Gladstone as Chancellor of the Exchequer, 1853, 1859–1865".
  - Chapter XI: "Mr. Gladstone as Leader of the House and Reformer, 1865–1868".
  - Chapter XIII: "Mr. Gladstone's First Premiership, 1868–1874".
  - Chapter XV: "Mr. Gladstone's First Retirement, 1874–1876".
  - Chapter XVI: "Mr. Gladstone and the Eastern Question, 1876–1879".
  - Chapter XVII: "Mr. Gladstone's Second Premiership, 1880–1885".
  - Chapter XVIII: "Mr. Gladstone and Home Rule, 1885–1892".
  - Chapter XIX: "Mr. Gladstone's Fourth Premiership and Final Retirement, 1892–1897".
- (1900). Liberalism and the Empire: Three Essays (part author).
  - 'Imperialism and Finance', pp. 1–117.
- (1903). Local Government in England (with J. Redlich, 2 vols.)
- (1903). Free Trade and Other Fundamental Doctrines of the Manchester School.
- (1903). History of Local Government in England.
- (1904). Adam Smith.
- (1905). Monopolies, Trusts and Cartels.
- (1906). The Arbiter in Council.
- (1907). A Library of Peace & War.
- (1910). The Credit of Nations.
- (1911). The National Expenditure of the United Kingdom.
- (1911). The Stock Exchange.
- (1912). Progress of the Nation.
- (1913). The Six Panics and Other Essays.
- (1915). The Political Economy of War (2nd ed.). London and Toronto: J. M. Dent. 1916 – via Internet Archive.
- (1922). The Paper Moneys of Europe.
- (1925). Alexander Gordon Cummins Harvey: A Memoir.
- (1925). From Adam Smith to Philip Snowden: A History of Free Trade in Great Britain.
- (1926). The Life and Letters of Thomas Jefferson.
- (1927). The Early Life and Letters of John Morley.
- (1927). Safeguarding and Protection in Great Britain and the United States.
- (1931). Wall Street and Lombard Street.
- (1931). Gladstone as Financier and Economist. London: Ernest Benn Limited. 1931 – via Internet Archive.
- (1933). Money: Gold, Silver, and Paper.
- (1934). The Consequences of the War to Great Britain.
- (1935). Liberty and Tyranny.
- (1935). Economic Freedom and Private Property.
- (1937). Armaments.
- (1942). Free Markets or Monopoly.
- (1943). Problems and Fallacies of Political Economy.
- (1944). Foreign Policy, Past and Future.
- (1944). Principles of Prosperity.
- (1946). Repeal of the Corn Laws.
- (1947). In the Golden Days.

== Notes ==
Preceded by Edward Johnstone	Editor of The Economist; 1907–1916	Succeeded by Hartley Withers
