= Baron Layton =

Barony in the Peerage of the United Kingdom

Baron Layton, of Danehill in the County of Sussex, is a title in the Peerage of the United Kingdom. It was created in 1947 for Sir Walter Layton, a prominent economist, editor and newspaper proprietor. He was editor of The Economist from 1922 to 1938. As of 2019 the title is held by his grandson, the fourth Baron—son of the first Baron's younger son David Layton—who succeeded in 2018.

== Barons Layton (1947) ==
- Walter Thomas Layton, 1st Baron Layton (1884–1966)
- Michael John Layton, 2nd Baron Layton (1912–1989)
- Geoffrey Michael Layton, 3rd Baron Layton (1947–2018)
- Jonathan Francis Layton, 4th Baron Layton (b. 1942)

The heir apparent is the present holder's son, the Hon. Jeremy Layton (b. 1978).
