= Hartley Withers =

English financial journalist (1867–1950)

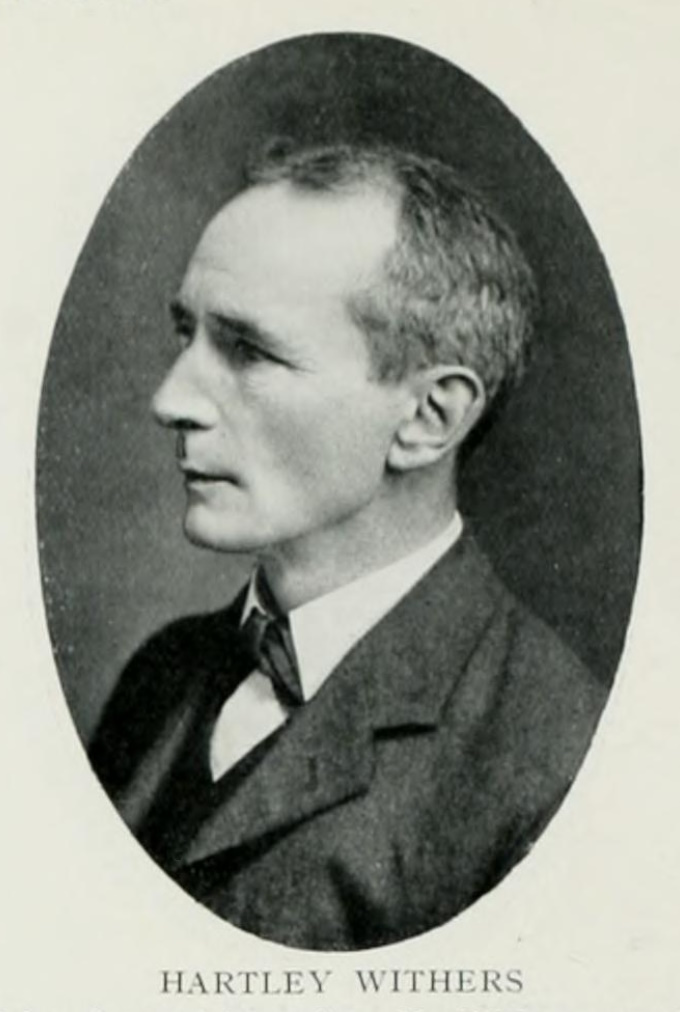
- Hartley Withers (photographed in about 1922).
- Born: Hartley Withers; 15 July 1867; Aigburth, Liverpool, England
- Died: 21 March 1950 (aged 82); Colchester, Essex
- Occupations: Financial journalist, author
- Writing career
- Genres: Popular finance and financial institutions

Hartley Withers (15 July 1867 – 21 March 1950) was a British financial journalist and a prolific author of books about finance and financial institutions aimed at a general readership.

His book The Meaning of Money, published in 1909, was considered an important and pioneering explanation and analysis of the financial organisation of modern society. Withers worked as a journalist and editor at The Times and The Morning Post.

At the outbreak of World War I he briefly worked in the British Treasury before becoming editor of The Economist from 1916 to 1921. During the 1920s Withers began to withdraw from regular journalism to focus on writing books.

== Early life ==
Hartley Withers was born on 15 July 1867 at Aigburth, a suburb of Liverpool, the son of Henry Hartley Withers, a bank manager and stockbroker, and his wife Jane Livingston (née Lowndes).^{[A]} He was educated at Westminster School, and matriculated at Christ Church, Oxford in 1886. He graduated in literae humaniores in 1890.

== Career ==
After graduating Withers was employed "for a short time" as an assistant master at Clifton College, a public school in the city of Bristol, after which he worked as a clerk at the Stock Exchange.

In 1894 Withers joined the staff of The Times, working in its City office.

Hartley Withers and Letitia Harrison were married on 8 August 1895.

By 1905 Withers had become discontented with his position at The Times. At that time The Tribune newspaper was in the process of being established as the organ of the British Liberal Party. Withers' senior colleague at The Times, F. Harcourt Kitchin, was invited to become its financial editor but declined the offer. The position was then offered to Withers who accepted. Kitchin, who had a high opinion of his colleague's personal and professional qualities, was horrified at this turn of events and prevailed upon Moberly Bell, the managing director of The Times, to offer to appoint Withers to the position of City editor as a counter offer. Withers then decided to remain at The Times and was appointed to the City editor position.

During the years preceding World War I Withers was one of three influential economic journalists writing for British journals, alongside Kitchin, his colleague at The Times (and later with The Morning Post), and Arthur W. Kiddy of The Standard.^{[B]}

In his obituary in The Times Withers was described as "a great financial journalist, who raised the status and enlarged the scope of his profession", who was "a pioneer in the analysis and explanation of the financial organization of modern society". His book The Meaning of Money, first published in 1909, was revised and reprinted several times. It was described as "a great book, epochal in finance", in which difficult concepts were presented "clearly, concisely and temperately" and with "scholarly precision". A review in the Manchester Guardian characterised The Meaning of Money in the following terms: "No common measure of literary accomplishment, a lucid, forceful and pointed style, and a great store of material for apt and often amusing illustration have lent both grace and charm to a work of quite exceptional utility".

Withers remained as City editor at The Times until 1910, after which he occupied the position of City editor for The Morning Post during 1911. After leaving The Morning Post he was employed until 1915 by the merchant banking firm of Seligman Brothers (the London branch of J. & W. Seligman & Co.). After the success of The Meaning of Money, Withers continued to write books dealing with aspects of finance and financial institutions, written in a lucid style suited to the general reader. The Meaning of Money was followed by eighteen other books in the period 1910 to 1939. In a review by the economist H. S. Foxwell of Money-Changing: An Introduction to Foreign Exchange (1913), the writer describes Withers' style: "He always goes straight to vital issues: he avoids technicalities and formulas: his exposition is perfectly clear, and his style almost dangerously easy and attractive". Foxwell adds that Withers' writing "is the kind of simplicity we often (perhaps only) find in the great masters: the result of a firm, clear grasp of essentials".

After the outbreak of World War I Withers served as the Director of Financial Inquiries, a statistical and information bureau in the British Treasury. He was also involved with the Parliamentary War Savings Committee which promoted war loans issued through post offices.

In 1916 Withers returned to journalism as editor of The Economist, replacing Francis Hirst. He remained at The Economist until 1921 (when he was succeeded by Walter Layton).

During the period 1921 to 1928 Withers was connected with The Saturday Review and the Daily Mail, but during this period he began to withdraw from regular journalism to concentrate on the writing of books. In 1925 it was written that Withers had "retired into the country to keep pigs". In 1927 he was living at Guildford in Surrey, south-west of London. He continued his prolific output of books during the 1920s and 1930s. His economic views were orthodox of the 'sound money' school. Withers last book was published in 1939; The Defeat of Poverty was described as "a stimulating and provocative contribution to the literature of economic recovery of the period".

== Death ==
Hartley Withers died on 21 March 1950 at Colchester in north-eastern Essex, aged 82. A memorial service for Withers was held on 20 April 1950 at St Dunstan-in-the-West in Fleet Street, London.

== Publications ==
- The English and the Dutch in South Africa: A Historical Retrospect (1896), London: Clement Wilson.
- The Cathedral Church of Canterbury: A Description of Its Fabric and a Brief History of the Archiepiscopal See (1901), London: George Bell & Sons.
- The Meaning of Money (1909), London: Smith, Elder & Co.
- Stocks and Shares (1910), London: Smith, Elder & Co.
- (co-author) The English Banking System (1910) (for the National Monetary Commission), Washington: Government Printing Office.
- Money-Changing: An Introduction to Foreign Exchange (1913), London: Smith, Elder & Co.
- Poverty and Waste (1914), London: John Murray.
- War and Lombard Street (1915), London: Smith, Elder & Co.
- International Finance (1916), London: Smith, Elder & Co.
- Our Money and the State (1917), London: John Murray.
- The Business of Finance (1918), London: John Murray.
- The League of Nations: Its Economic Aspect (1918), London: Humphrey Milford.
- War-time Financial Problems (1919), London: John Murray.
- The Case for Capitalism (1920), New York: E. P. Dutton & Co.
- Hints About Investments (1926), London: E. Nash & Grayson.
- Money (1927), Benn's Sixpenny Library No. 179.
- Everybody's Business (1931), London: Jonathan Cape.
- Money in the Melting Pot (1932), London: Sidgwick & Jackson.
- National Provincial Bank, 1833-1933 (1933)
- Investing Simplified (1934), London: Thornton Butterworth.
- The Defeat of Poverty (1939), London: Jonathan Cape.

== Notes ==
A.The educationist Harry Livingston Withers was his elder brother.

B.All three journalists occupied the position of financial editor of The Morning Post at various times. F. Harcourt Kitchin left The Times in 1906 to take up that position. In 1911 he was replaced by Hartley Withers. Arthur W. Kiddy was financial editor of The Morning Post from 1915 to 1937.
