= Harry Livingston Withers =

British educationist and professor

Harry Livingston Withers (1864 – 12 December 1902), was a British educationist and professor.

== Life ==
Withers was born in Liverpool in 1864, the third son of Henry Hartley Withers, a bank manager and stockbroker, and his wife Jane Livingston Lowndes, daughter of Matthew Dobson Lowndes; the journalist and author Hartley Withers (1867–1950) was his younger brother.

He was educated at King's College School, London, and at Balliol College, Oxford, where he won an open classical scholarship in 1882. He obtained a first class in classical moderations, and a first class in Literae humaniores. After leaving college, he served for a time as assistant master in the Wesleyan Elementary Day School in Oxford, in order to acquire experience in the theory and practice of education, in which field he was already interested. He was successively master at the City of London School, the Manchester Grammar School, and Clifton College. From 1893 to 1899 he was principal of the Isleworth Training College, and from 1899 he held the Chair of Education as professor at Owens College Manchester. He was also the first chairman of the council for the registration of teachers when it was instituted by the Board of Education.

He died at Manchester on 12 December 1902.
