= Elma Tryphosa Dangerfield =

Elma Tryphosa Dangerfield CBE (11 October 1907 - 22 January 2006) was a British journalist, writer, campaigner and Liberal Party politician.

== Background ==
She was born in Liverpool as Elma Tryphosa Birkett but brought up partly in the Philippines, China, and Japan. She was educated in England at Beaufort School, Camberley, and University College London. In 1926 she married Edward Dangerfield. They had one daughter.

She was Secretary, then Director of the Byron Society from 1971-2006.

== Political career ==
She was the Director of the European-Atlantic Group. She was a member of Royal Institute of International Affairs, and a Fellow of the Institute of Directors. She contested Aberdeen South in the United Kingdom general election of 1959. She was Director, of the United Kingdom Council of the European Movement. She was Joint Executive Editor of European Review. She contested Hitchin in the United Kingdom general election of 1964.

=== Election contests ===
General Election 1959: Aberdeen South
| Party | Candidate | Votes | % | ±% |
|---|---|---|---|---|
| Unionist | Priscilla Buchan | 25,471 | 53.8 | +3.8 |
| Labour | Peter Doig | 17,349 | 36.6 | −5.8 |
| Liberal | Elma Dangerfield | 4,558 | 9.6 | n/a |
| Majority | | 8,122 | 17.2 | +9.6 |
| Turnout | | | 81.6 | −2.2 |
| Unionist hold | | Swing | +4.8 | |

General Election 1964: Hitchin
| Party | Candidate | Votes | % | ±% |
|---|---|---|---|---|
| Labour | Shirley Williams | 34,034 | 45.8 | |
| Conservative | Martin Maddan | 30,649 | 41.3 | |
| Liberal | Elma Dangerfield | 9,564 | 12.9 | |
| Majority | | 3,385 | 4.6 | |
| Turnout | | | 84.5 | |
| Labour gain from Conservative | | Swing | | |

In 1960 she was appointed OBE. In 2002 she was appointed a CBE.
