= Budyně nad Ohří =

- Town
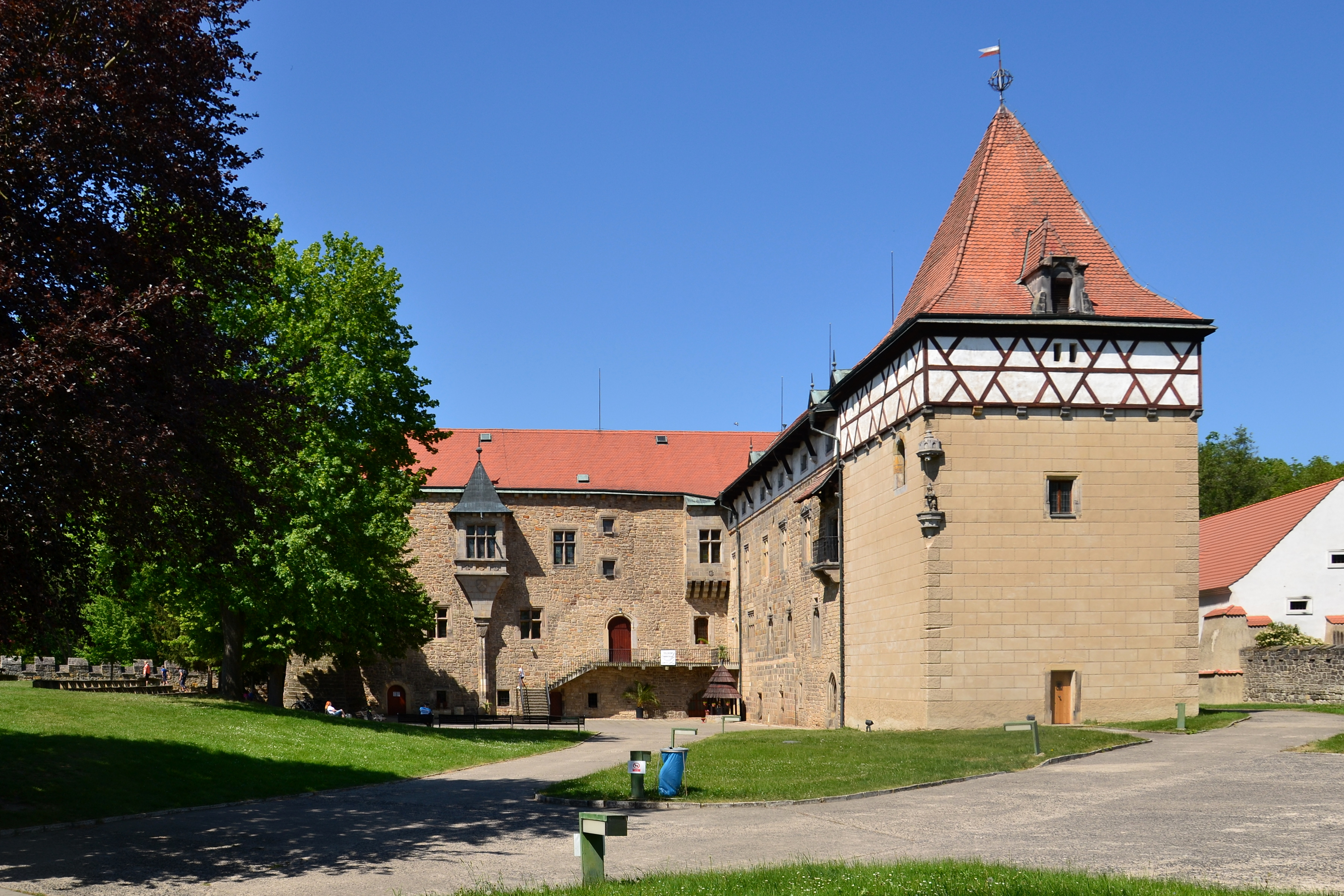
- Budyně nad Ohří Castle

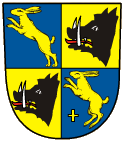
- Flag Coat of arms

- Location in the Czech Republic
- Coordinates: 50°24′11″N 14°7′55″E
- Country: Czech Republic
- Region: Ústí nad Labem
- District: Litoměřice
- First mentioned: 1173

Government
  - Mayor: Petr Kindl (KDU-ČSL)

Area
  - Total: 33.57 km^{2} (12.96 sq mi)
- Elevation: 431 m (1,414 ft)

Population (2026-01-01)
  - Total: 2,152
  - Density: 64.10/km^{2} (166.0/sq mi)
- Time zone: UTC+1 (CET)
  - Summer (DST): UTC+2 (CEST)
- Postal code: 411 18
- Website: www.budyne.cz

Budyně nad Ohří (Czech pronunciation: [ˈbudɪɲɛ ˈnat oɦr̝iː]; German: Budin an der Eger) is a town in Litoměřice District in the Ústí nad Labem Region of the Czech Republic. It has about 2,200 inhabitants. The town is located on the Ohře River in the Lower Ohře Table.

The historic town centre is well preserved and is protected as an urban monument zone. The main landmark is the Budyně nad Ohří Castle.

== Administrative division ==
Budyně nad Ohří consists of seven municipal parts (in brackets population according to the 2021 census):

- Budyně nad Ohří (1,374)
- Břežany nad Ohří (142)
- Kostelec nad Ohří (122)
- Nížebohy (188)
- Písty (108)
- Roudníček (98)
- Vrbka (94)

== Etymology ==
The name Budyně is derived from the personal name Buda, meaning "Buda's (village)".

== Geography ==
Budyně nad Ohří is located about 15 kilometres (9 mi) south of Litoměřice and 38 km (24 mi) northwest of Prague. It lies in a flat and mainly agricultural landscape in the Lower Ohře Table. The Ohře River flows through the town.

== History ==
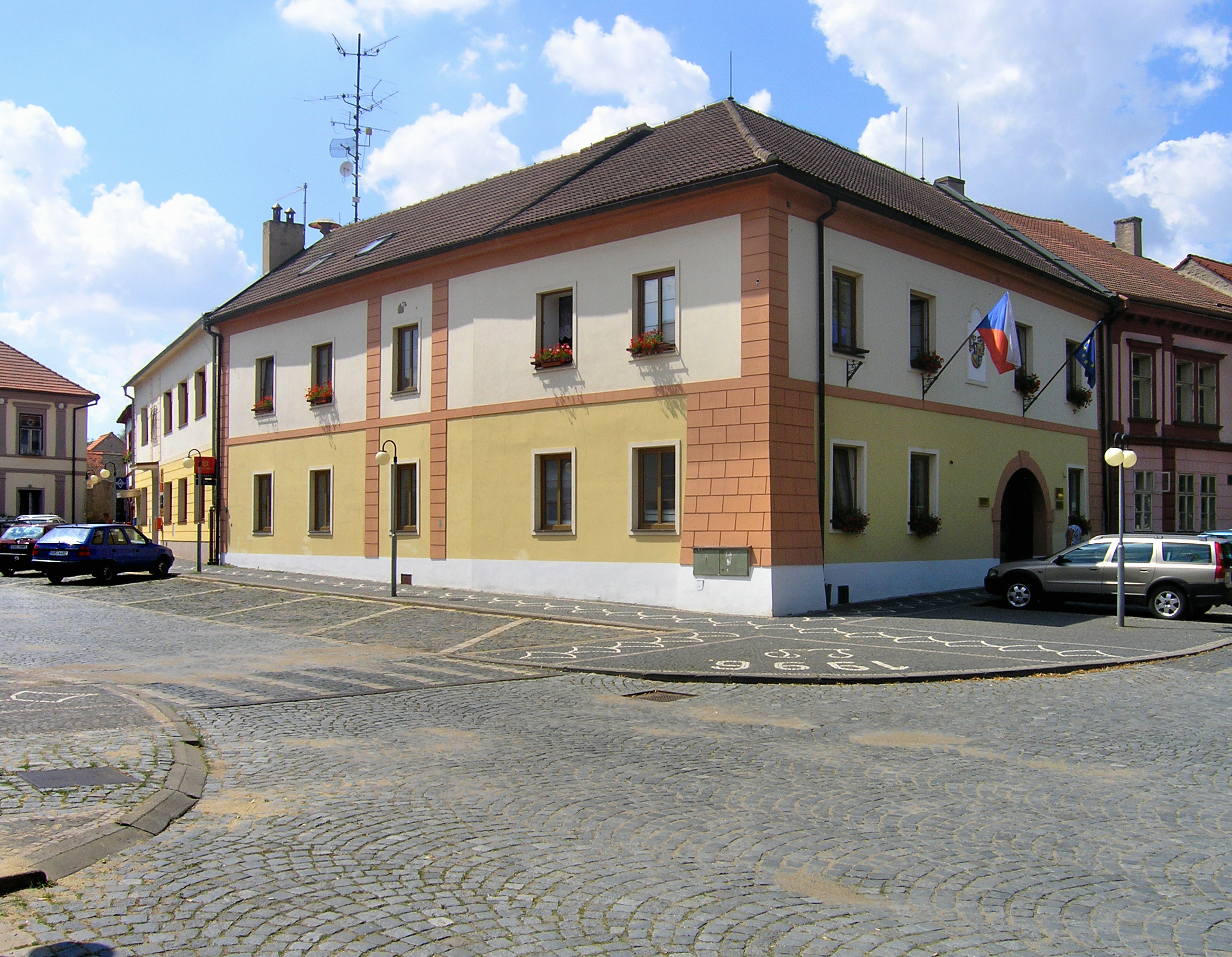
Town hall

The first written mention of Budyně nad Ohří is from 1173. Originally there was a wooden castle, but it was rebuilt to a Gothic stone castle by King Ottokar I at the beginning of the 13th century. King John of Bohemia sold Budyně to the noble family of Zajíc of Hazmburk, who owned it until 1613. During their rule, the castle and the whole estate prospered and developed.

== Demographics ==
Historical population

Year	Pop.	±%
1869	3,053	—
1880	3,124	+2.3%
1890	3,116	−0.3%
1900	3,234	+3.8%
1910	3,454	+6.8%

Year	Pop.	±%
1921	3,468	+0.4%
1930	3,230	−6.9%
1950	2,527	−21.8%
1961	2,605	+3.1%
1970	2,379	−8.7%

Year	Pop.	±%
1980	2,197	−7.7%
1991	1,880	−14.4%
2001	1,879	−0.1%
2011	2,077	+10.5%
2021	2,126	+2.4%

Source: Censuses

== Transport ==
Budyně nad Ohří is located on the railway from Roudnice nad Labem to Libochovice. Historic trains run on it and it is only in operation during the summer tourist season on weekends.

== Sights ==
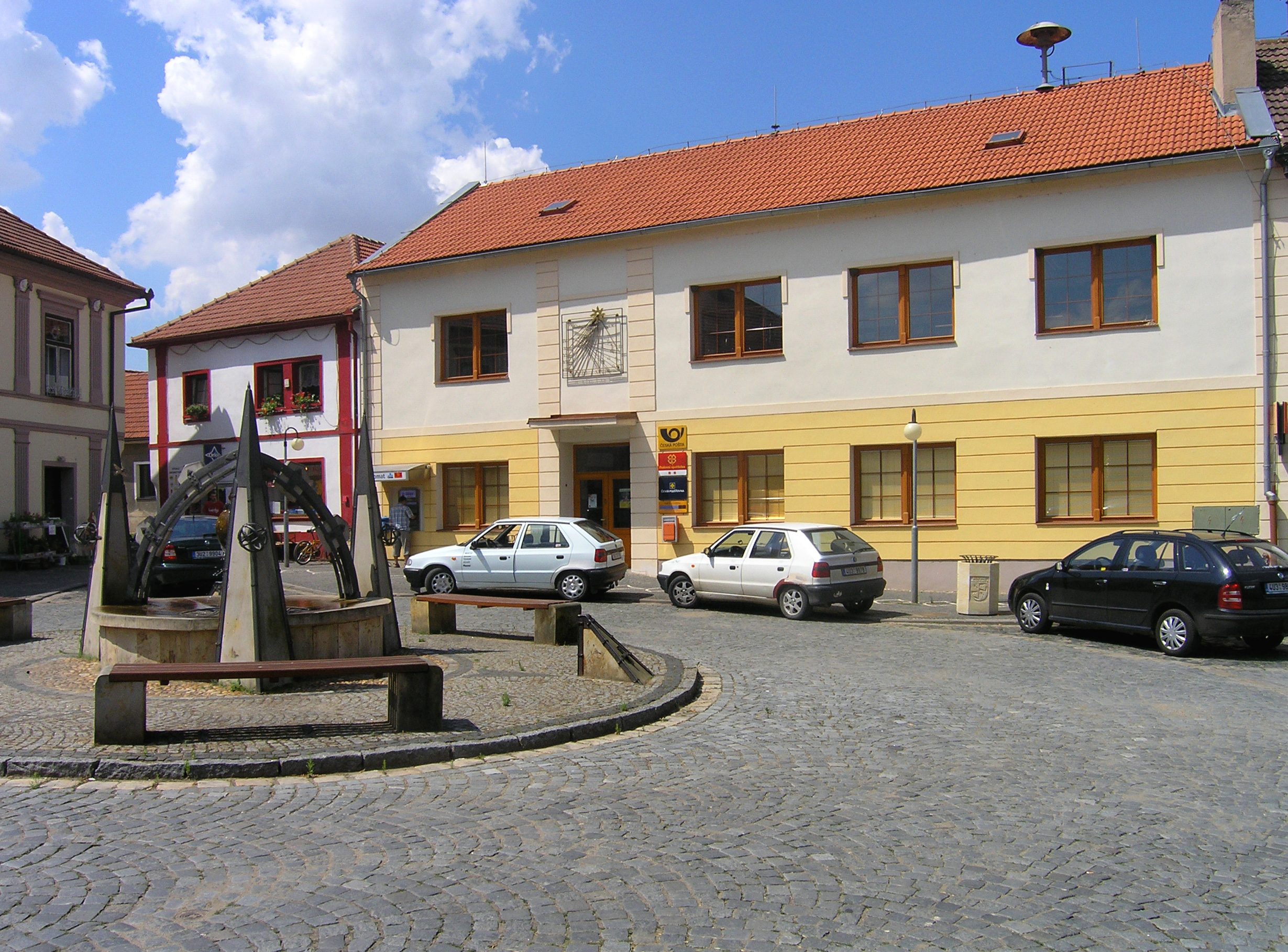
Town square

Budyně nad Ohří is known for its water castle. Since 1946, it has been owned by the town. In the 1920s, the Janda's Museum was founded in the premises of the castle with an exposition of donations from travellers and private collections of the inhabitants of the region. The museum was reopened in 1997.

The main landmark of the town square is the Church of Saint Wenceslaus. It was founded in the 13th century. After it was damaged by a fire in 1669, the originally Gothic church was rebuilt in the Baroque style. In 1710, the church was extended.

== Notable people ==
- Bavor Rodovský mladší of Hustířany (1526–1591), nobleman and alchemist; died here
- Petr Čech (1944–2022), hurdler

== Twin towns – sister cities ==
Budyně nad Ohří is twinned with:

- Hohnstein, Germany
