= The North London Literary Festival =

North London Literary Festival
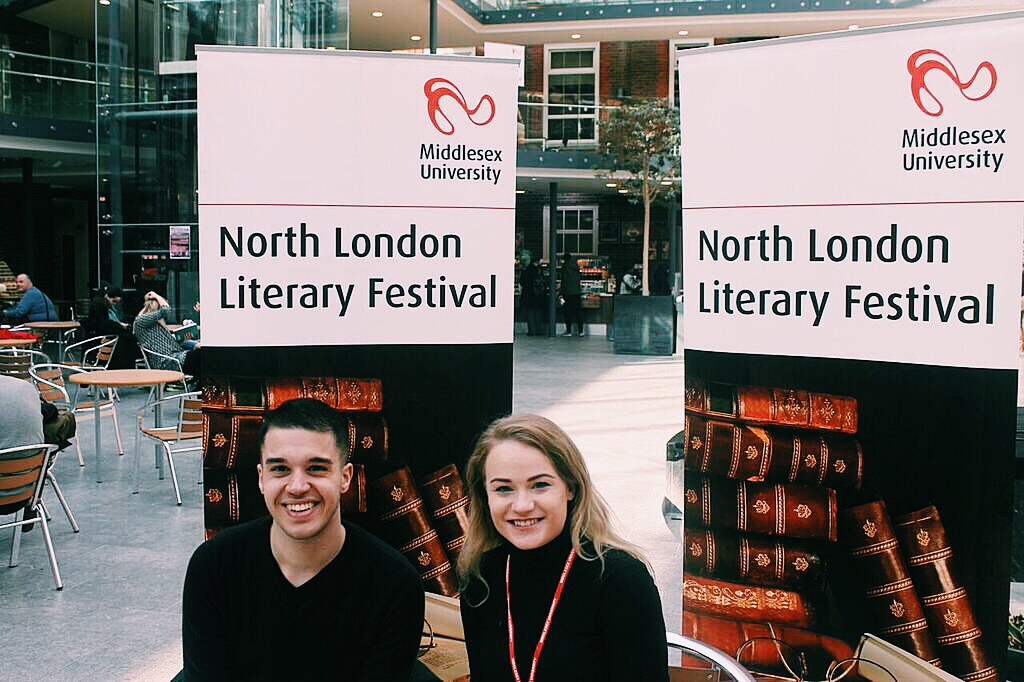
- Student organisers, Middlesex University
- Date: 16 March 2017
- Ends: 1 day event
- Frequency: Annually
- Venue: Hendon Campus, College Building
- Location: Middlesex University
- Country: London
- Years active: 1996-present
- Inaugurated: 1996
- Founder: Sue Gee
- Most recent: 13 March 2018
- Previous event: 23–24 March 2015
- Area: Hendon, London
- Leader: Chris Callow Jr.
- Sponsor: Middlesex University
- Website: northlondonlitfest.com (archived)

The North London Literary Festival was an annual event held at Middlesex University and the surrounding areas of North London. The event was student-led in order for them to gain key experience, and the festival was free to access for students and the public. It ran from 2013 to 2015, as a three-day event.

== History ==
Running annually since 1996, the festival aims to celebrate literary works through pop-up readings by students around North London, as well as guest speakers and workshops at the Hendon campus of Middlesex University. The event was founded by novelist Sue Gee, but was student-led in order for them to gain key experience, and the festival was free to access for students and the public.

The festival is not associated with the North London Book Fest, which was established at Alexandra Palace in 2024.

== Speakers ==
Previous speakers include Justin Cartwright, Philip Hensher, A. L. Kennedy, Linton Kwesi Johnson, Andrea Levy, Andrew Motion, Jan Pieńkowski, David Puttnam and Fay Weldon.

Notable speakers include: David Nicholls, author of One Day (2009) and Galaxy Book of the Year winner, in 2014, Dame Professor Carol Ann Duffy in 2015. In 2013, the festival secured a reading from horror novelist, James Herbert. Noted as a ‘rare appearance’, Herbert was set to discuss his latest work but unexpectedly died before the event.

The main three-day event is held in late March or early April each year. Aside from a number of notable speakers, the festival typically included fiction and screen writing workshops, book signings and competitions.

== See also ==
- London Literature Festival
