= European-Atlantic Group =

Non-governmental organization

The European-Atlantic Group (E-AG) is a non-governmental organization which aims to promote closer relations between the European and Atlantic countries by providing a forum in Britain for discussion of their problems and possibilities for better economic and political cooperation. The E-AG is a wide-ranging, non-aligned, all-party, registered charity, based in Westminster, which works in the field of international relations. Most E-AG meetings since 2018 have been held at Westminster in House of Commons committee rooms; when Parliament is not sitting, however, meetings may be held in the City or elsewhere in London. E-AG trustees were Lord Hamilton of Epsom and Christopher Arkell until July 2018, when new trustees were appointed. The group aims to strengthen trans-Atlantic links. Its future depends on the support of those who care about issues such as defense and security, the UK's relationship with the United States, NATO, and international challenges. The E-AG, a non-party organization, is classified as educational by the Charity Commission for England and Wales.

== History ==
The E-AG was founded in London in 1954 by Council of Europe vice-president Michael Layton, 2nd Baron Layton, other members of both Houses of Parliament, industrialists, bankers, economists, journalists and Elma Dangerfield. Its founders said that their purpose was to disseminate authoritative information about the work of international organizations such as the Council of Europe, NATO, the OECD, the Western European Union, the European Coal and Steel Community, Euratom, the European Economic Community, the European Free Trade Association, the Association for General Agreement on Trade and Tariffs, and the United Nations Economic Commission for Europe. The Association for General Agreement on Trade and Tariffs followed the signing of the General Agreement on Tariffs and Trade on 30 October 1947.

The group's London office was originally at 6 Gertrude Street in Chelsea. In addition to holding monthly dinners and meetings in London, the group sent delegations abroad to European and NATO institutions in Brussels, Paris and Luxembourg, and to Germany, Italy, Turkey and Greece, as guests of governments and international organizations. Group representatives have also visited the United States, the Soviet Union and the Eastern Bloc with the object of improving East-West relations. The E-AG has held discussions on European-Atlantic relations with the Middle East, the Far East, Africa, Afghanistan, and Latin American countries.

== Events and participants ==
The E-AG has hosted anniversary banquets for the founding of NATO each decade. In 1989, NATO's 40th anniversary, the Duke of Edinburgh was the main speaker at Guildhall; General John Galvin (US Army), Supreme Allied Commander in Europe, also spoke. The 50th-anniversary celebration was also at Guildhall with the Duke of York, NATO Secretary-General Manfred Worner, the Foreign Minister of Poland and 525 delegates. In 2009, NATO's 60th anniversary was celebrated at St James's Palace with 27 ambassadors among the delegates; the main speaker was again the Duke of York.

E-AG monthly events have been addressed by President Nyerere of Tanzania; King Hussain of Jordan and his brother, Prince Hassan; Ian Duncan-Smith; Michael Howard; David Blunkett, and former presidents Kenneth Kaunda of Zambia, Tan Mahathir of Malaysia and Vytautas Landsbergis of Lithuania. Elma Dangerfield was appointed a CBE for her work with the group.

Afghanistan, South Sudan, Lithuania and Ukraine have been the subjects of discussion and analysis. E-AG speakers have included royalty, presidents, the ambassadors of the United States, China and Russia, ministers, shadow ministers, the head of MI5, and the chiefs of the British armed forces. The E-AG hosts an annual meeting, usually held in November, at which two former members of Congress (representing the Democratic and Republican Parties) are guests.

== Administration ==
The E-AG's president and co-founder was the Earl of Bessborough. Vice-presidents have including The Marquess of Lansdowne, the Earl of Limerick, Earl Jellicoe, Lord Carrington, Lord Chalfont, Lord Shawcross, Lord Granchester, Nicholas Henderson, Frederic Bennett, Fitzroy Maclean, General Harry Tuzo, and Douglas Fairbanks Jr. Its chairman was Geoffrey Rippon; vice-chairmen were Antony Buck and Sir W. Hugh-Jones. Director was Elma Dangerfield, who co-founded the group in 1954 and remained active in it into her nineties, was director. Justin Glass, who became finance director in 1987, was Dangerfield's co-director from 1992 until her death in January 2006 and retired from the group in 2012. He was succeeded as director by Anthony Westnedge. Other E-AG presidents have included Lord Layton, the Earl of Listowel, Geoffrey de Freitas and, since the 1990s, the Earl of Bessborough Frank Roberts, Lord Rippon, Lord Dahrendorf, Lord Judd, the Earl of Limerick, the Viscount Montgomery of Alamein, Michael Burton, Baroness Hooper, Lord Dykes, and Baroness Symons of Vernam Dean.

== 2014 – July 2018 meetings ==
Charles Bennett was the E-AG director during this period.

- 2014: "US Politics after the Mid-term Elections: Congress, the President, and the issues" - Mary Bono (Republican, CA) and Brian Baird (Democratic, WA)
- 2015: "High Command – British Military Leadership in the Iraq and Afghanistan Wars" - Major-General Christopher Elliott
  - "Ukraine, Russia, and Eastern Europe" - Edward Lucas and James Sherr
  - "The future of the euro and the prospects of Brexit" - Patrick Minford (held in the City of London, and sponsored by Xchanging)
  - "The EU–Russia relationship, with special reference to the security of the Baltic states – former president of Lithuania Vytautas Landsbergis
  - "South Sudan, Oil and Blood: civil War continues to undermine the new state" – BBC Sudan correspondent James Copnall and Newsweek contributing editor Alex Perry
  - "Greece: the way forward?" – Oxford University professor of international relations Kalypso Nicolaidis, Centre for Economics and Business Research chief economic advisor Vicky Pryce, and University of Oxford European Studies Centre southeast European studies director Othon Anastasakis
  - "Kurdistan: its fight against Daesh/ISIS and its future" – Karwan Jamal Tahir – Kurdistan Regional Government High Representative to the UK, Democratic Nation Party of Iraq founder Mithal Al Alusi, and All-Party Parliamentary Group on Kurdistan director Gary Kent
  - "Security and Secrecy, Privacy and Liberty Electronic Surveillance in the wake of the Anderson Report" - Privacy International deputy director Eric King and The Economist senior editor Edward Lucas
  - "The EU and the Migration Crisis" - Hungarian ambassador Péter Szabadhegy
  - "Congress, the President, the issues one year from Election Day" - Tom Petri (Republican from Wisconsin) and Jim Moran (Democrat from Virginia)
- 2016: "The European Union and the Referendum" – UK Independence Party deputy chair Suzanne Evans and MP Nicholas Soames
  - "The Future of Iraq and British policy in the Middle East" with Mithal Al Alusi
  - "The Political and Military Significance of Gibraltar" with Lieutenant General James Dutton
  - "Yemen: the war drags on for what?" with Pembroke College, Oxford fellow Elisabeth Kendall
  - "Islam in Britain" with author Innes Bowen and former al-Qaeda member Aimen Dean
  - "Pakistan: its Past, Present, and Future" with St Antony's College, Oxford, Indian and Modern South Asian history reader Faisal Devji
  - "Congress, the President, the issues after Election Day" with Martin Frost (Democrat from Texas) and Phil Gingrey (Republican from Georgia)
- 2017: "Somaliland – the case for recognition", with Somaliland Minister of Foreign Affairs Saad Shire
  - "Zimbabwe: Will Mugabe & ZANU (PF) hold onto power in 2018?" with Zimbabwean politician Tendai Biti
  - "Poland and the United Kingdom: Post-Brexit Relations", with Polish ambassador Arkady Józef Rzegocki
  - "Brexit & British-Irish Relations", with Ambassador to the UK and Ambassador-designate to the US Dan Mulhall
  - "The Kurdistan Independence Referendum", with Kurdistan Regional Government High Representative to the United Kingdom Karwan Jamal Tahir
  - "Europe's Forgotten War in Eastern Ukraine", with Ukrainian Embassy Defence Attaché Borys Kremenetskyi
  - "US Politics One Year On from the Presidential Election", with Sam Farr (D-CA) and Dan Benishek (R-MI)
  - "Lithuania and the Defence of the Baltic States", with UK Lithuanian ambassador Renatas Norkus
- 2018: "Strengthening Joint Euro-Atlantic Security Space: A Perspective From Latvia", with UK Latvian ambassador Baiba Braže
  - "Irish Republican terrorism past, present, and future: Have the IRA Gone Away?" with William R. Matchett, formerly of the Royal Ulster Constabulary Special Branch
  - "How ordinary democratic process, not violence, got British women the vote", with Belinda Brown
