= Dolní Chvatliny =

- Municipality
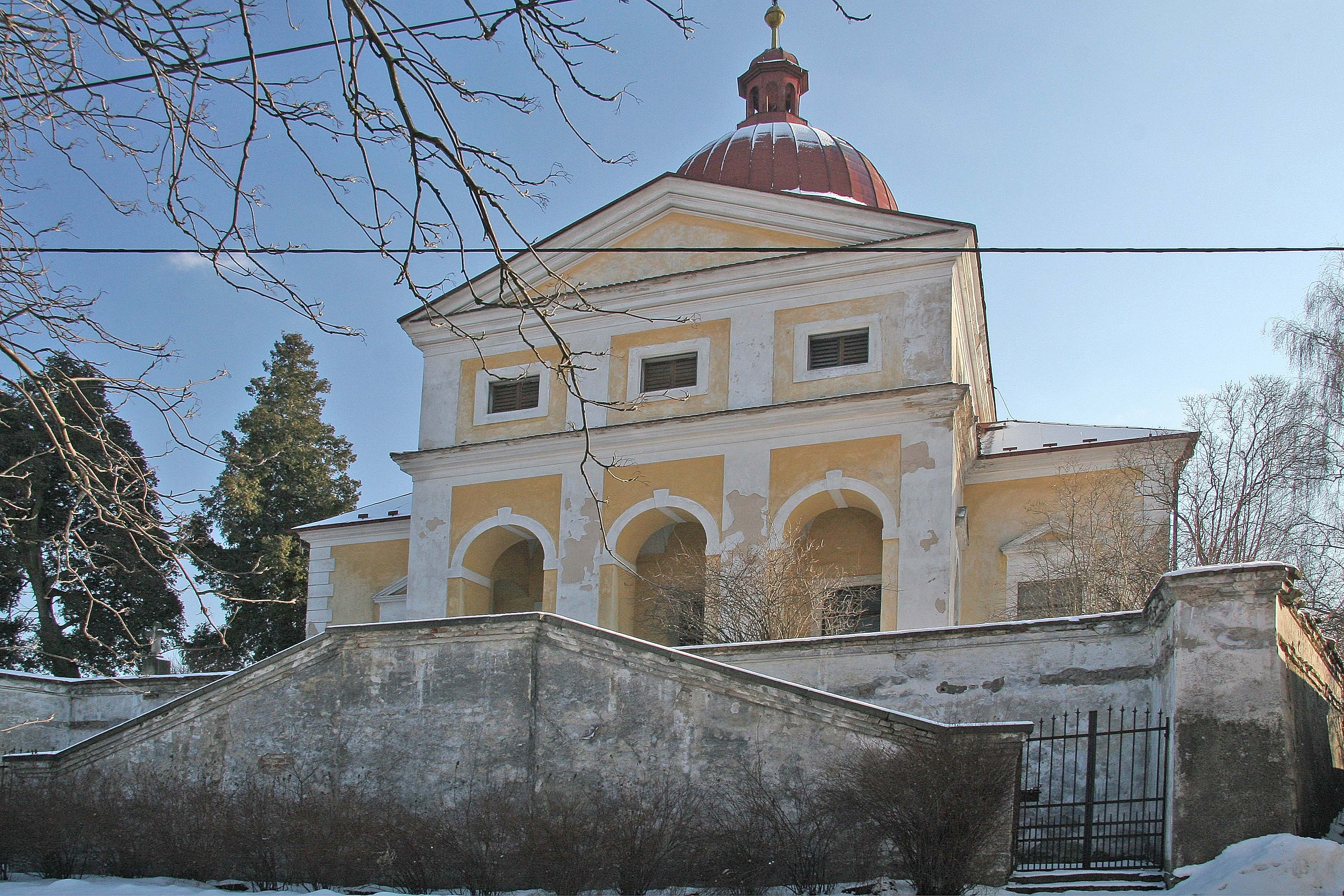
- Church of Saints Peter and Paul

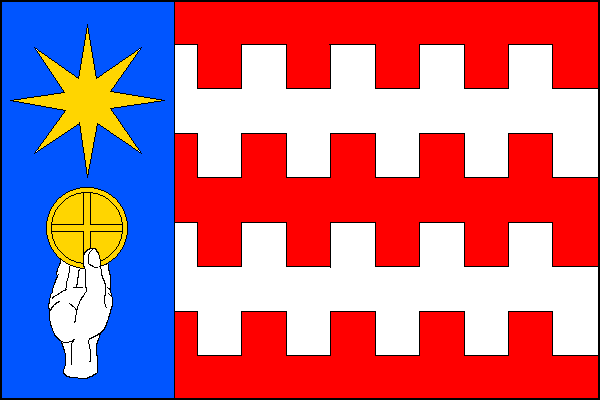
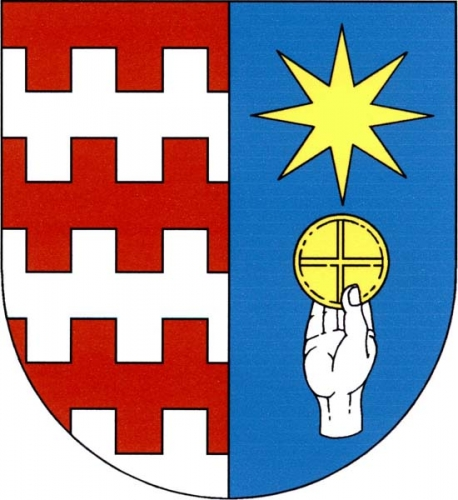
- Flag Coat of arms

- Location in the Czech Republic
- Coordinates: 49°58′50″N 15°4′10″E
- Country: Czech Republic
- Region: Central Bohemian
- District: Kolín
- First mentioned: 1250

Area
  - Total: 12.23 km^{2} (4.72 sq mi)
- Elevation: 295 m (968 ft)

Population (2026-01-01)
  - Total: 534
  - Density: 43.7/km^{2} (113/sq mi)
- Time zone: UTC+1 (CET)
  - Summer (DST): UTC+2 (CEST)
- Postal code: 281 44
- Website: www.dolnichvatliny.cz

Dolní Chvatliny is a municipality and village in Kolín District in the Central Bohemian Region of the Czech Republic. It has about 500 inhabitants.

== Administrative division ==
Dolní Chvatliny consists of three municipal parts (in brackets population according to the 2021 census):

- Dolní Chvatliny (242)
- Horní Chvatliny (125)
- Mančice (109)

== Etymology ==
At the time the settlement was founded, it consisted of a single settlement, and the name was used in the singular form, Chvatlina. The origin of the name is uncertain. It could have alluded to the behaviour of the local inhabitants and been derived from the Czech verbs chvátat ('to hurry') or uchvátit ('to seize'), but it could also have been the name of the first settler. After Dolní Chvatlina ('lower Chvatlina) and Horní Chvatlina ('upper Chvatlina') began to be distinguished, both the names changed to the plural form Chvatliny.

== Geography ==
Dolní Chvatliny is located about 10 kilometres (6 mi) southwest of Kolín and 39 km (24 mi) east of Prague. It lies in an agricultural landscape in the Upper Sázava Hills. The highest point is at 354 m (1,161 ft) above sea level.

== History ==
The first written mention of Chvatliny, when Dolní Chvatliny and Horní Chvatliny have not yet been distinguished, is from 1250. Dolní Chvatliny and Horní Chvatliny have been distinguished since 1386.

== Demographics ==
Historical population

Year	Pop.	±%
1869	890	—
1880	979	+10.0%
1890	1,068	+9.1%
1900	1,080	+1.1%
1910	1,081	+0.1%

Year	Pop.	±%
1921	1,021	−5.6%
1930	1,001	−2.0%
1950	690	−31.1%
1961	640	−7.2%
1970	595	−7.0%

Year	Pop.	±%
1980	518	−12.9%
1991	431	−16.8%
2001	411	−4.6%
2011	423	+2.9%
2021	476	+12.5%

Source: Censuses

== Transport ==
There are no railways or major roads passing through the municipality.

== Sights ==
The main landmark of Dolní Chvatliny is the Church of Saints Peter and Paul. It was built in the Empire style in 1814–1827.

== Notable people ==
- Františka Zeminová (1882–1962), Czech women's rights activist and politician
