= Marek Jerzy Tadeusz Mayer =

British environmentalist

Marek Mayer (1952–2005) was a prominent environmental journalist who influenced the development of UK environmental policy for over 25 years.

== Biography ==
Born in London of Polish parents, Marek obtained a master's degree in environmental studies at Manchester University before joining the fledgling subscription journal ENDS Report (Environmental Data Services) in 1979. The journal had been founded shortly before by Edward Max Nicholson and David Layton of Incomes Data Services, an early attempt to engage British business with environmental protection. Within ten years this had become a successful business led by Mayer.

The journal faced hard times in its early years and its staff complement fell to just two - with Marek providing all of the content for many years. However, as the environmental business agenda grew in the 1980s, the journal took off and became essential reading for politicians, business specialists, campaigners and consultants.

Marek's ability to scan vast amounts of information and his eye for detail made him a force to be reckoned with. Although he became a director of a successful business which employed over thirty people, his top priority remained the environment and he never lost his enthusiasm for journalism.

Marek continued to make a substantial contribution to the ENDS Report until months before his death from kidney cancer on 23 July 2005.
