= London Literature Festival =

Literary festival in London

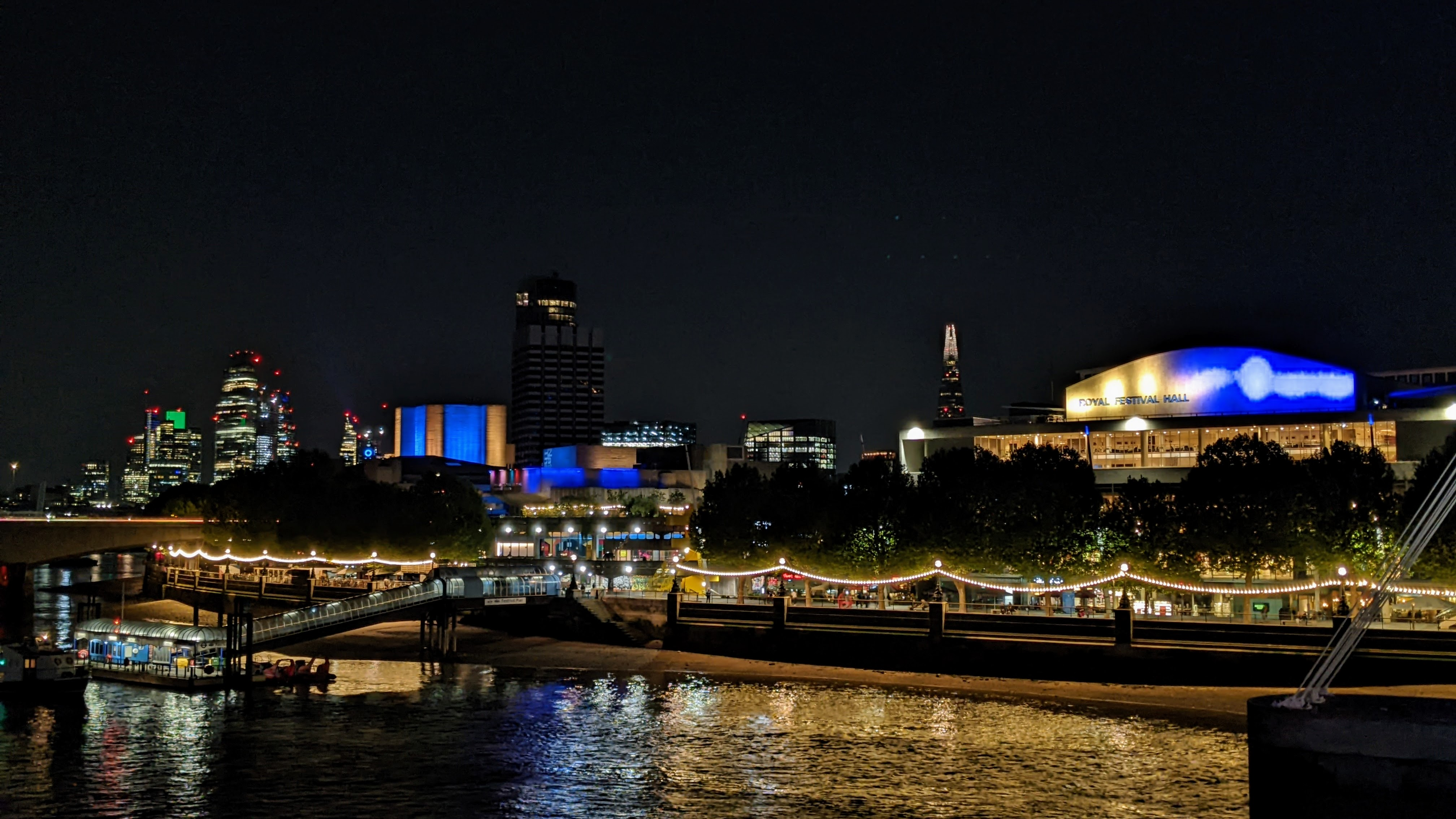
- The event is held at the Southbank Centre
- Genre: Literary festival
- Locations: Southbank Centre, London, England
- Coordinates: 51.506383°N 0.116803°W
- Country: United Kingdom
- Inaugurated: 2007
- Website: londonlitfest.com/index

The London Literature Festival is an annually held literary festival held in the Southbank Centre since its first event in 2007.

== History ==
The event was inaugurated in 2007 following the reopening of the Royal Festival Hall and National Poetry Library. It was one of the first attempts to set up a literature festival in London, with The Word festival, established by Peter Florence in 1999, lasting only four years. The London Literature Festival managed to endure, and has attracted a number of high profile guest speakers over its history including Tom Hanks, Greta Thunberg and Hillary Clinton.

In 2023, the event announced the introduction of guest curatorships, including the 2024 curatorship of Ghetts. The planned 2026 event coincides with the National Year of Reading and the 75th anniversary of the Southbank Centre. Dua Lipa is serving as guest curator in partnership with her Service95 Book Club; her involvement in the event has attracted significant publicity.

== Event ==
The event takes place in Autumn annually, lasting around two weeks. It focuses on literature and spoken word, inviting the participation of writers, performers and other cultural figures. The event includes displays, activities and performances, as well as appearances from authors and book launches.

== See also ==
- North London Literary Festival
