= The ENDS Report =

Founded in 1978, The ENDS Report is a magazine published in the United Kingdom and covering environmental policy and business, news, official reports, UK and EU policy and legislation, and how environmental issues affect corporate strategy. It is published monthly by Environmental Data Services Ltd, part of the Haymarket Group, and is subscription only. The headquarters of the magazine is in London.

Regular sections include:

- News
- Corporate
- Energy & Climate
- Waste & Resources
- Pollution and Clean-up
- Supply Chain
- Science
- Features
- Policy Briefing (National)
- Policy Briefing (International)
- In Parliament
- In Court
- Events
- Services, Courses and Appointments
- Environmental Trends

== Former editor ==
The ENDS Report was edited from 1981 to 1997 by Marek Mayer, who also was editorial director from 1997 until his death in 2005.
