= Mike Layton (journalist) =

American journalist

- Born: Myron J. Layton; November 24, 1922; Nebraska, U.S.
- Died: March 20, 2011 (aged 88); Seattle, Washington, U.S.
- Education: University of Denver (1950)
- Occupations: Journalist; author
- Notable credit(s): Seattle Post-Intelligencer (journalist, columnist), The Olympian (at one time The Daily Olympian) (journalist); Easy Blood: Ronald Reagan's Proxy Wars in Central America (non-fiction book); My Very Worst Friend (memoir/autobiography); The Laytons: A Westering Family (family history)

Myron J. Layton (November 24, 1922 – March 20, 2011) was an American newspaper journalist and author who wrote for The Seattle Post-Intelligencer and The Olympian from the 1960s through the 1980s, often covering Washington state politics. Before and after Pearl Harbor, Layton served in the US Army remote Aleutian Islands. Later, in 1944–45, he served as a paratrooper in the European theater of World War II, in the 82nd Airborne Division. Layton was also a veteran of the Korean War, serving in the 11th Airborne Division and 10th Special Forces Group. Layton wrote the book Easy Blood: Ronald Reagan's Proxy Wars in Central America, about his research and experiences travelling in Central America (in particular Nicaragua), and My Very Worst Friend, a memoir and autobiography.
