= Michael Layton, 2nd Baron Layton =

Michael John Layton, 2nd Baron Layton (28 September 1912 – 23 January 1989), was, with his father Walter Layton, 1st Baron Layton, a founder member, and President (1983–1989) of the European-Atlantic Group, and was an active Internationalist.

== Biography ==
He was born in 1912 and his parents were Lord and Lady Layton.

Lord Layton was educated at St Paul's School, and Gonville and Caius College, Cambridge. He married, in 1938, Dorothy, daughter of Albert Cross, and succeeded his father in the hereditary barony in February 1966.

He was a businessman with numerous directorships, including The News Chronicle (1950-1960), The Economist (1973-1985), and the Steel Company of Wales, which was merged with the British Steel Corporation, (1967-1977), having served as Chairman of BSC in 1966, 1973, and 1975, and President (1983-1988).

Lord Layton was a Member for Metallurgy of the Allied Control Commission in Berlin after World War II, later being on the Economic Sub-Committee which founded the Organisation for Economic Co-operation and Development (OECD) in Paris.

He became a fervent supporter of the Conservative Party in the House of Lords, where he made a number of speeches on the Steel industry, Economics, and International Affairs.

He was succeeded by his son and heir, Geoffrey Michael Layton, 3rd Baron Layton (b. 1947), who, like his father and grandfather, joined the Committee of the European-Atlantic Group.

Peerage of the United Kingdom
Preceded by Walter Thomas Layton	Baron Layton; 1966–1989	Succeeded by Geoffrey Michael Layton
