= Velichovky =

- Municipality
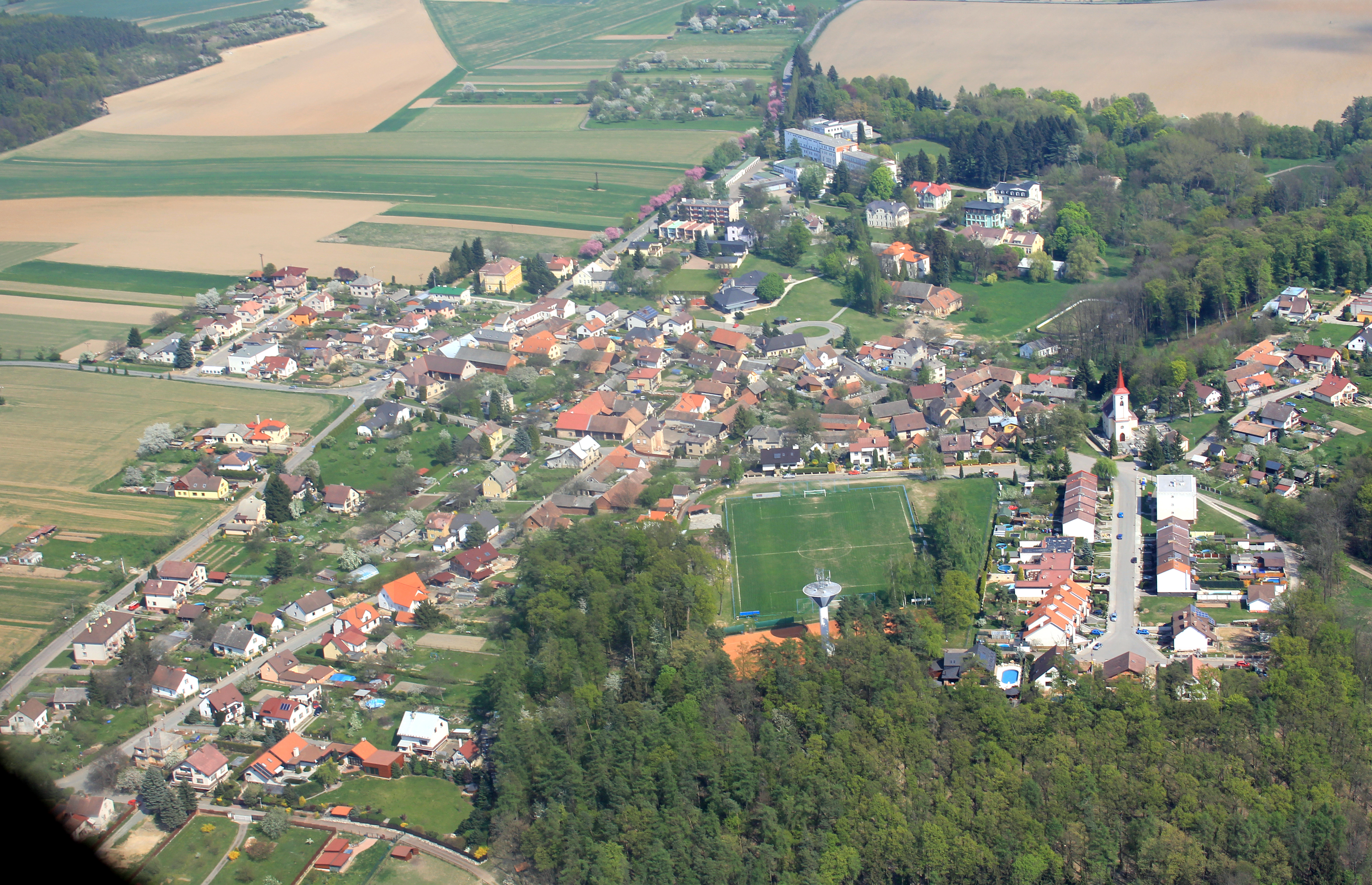
- Aerial view of Velichovky

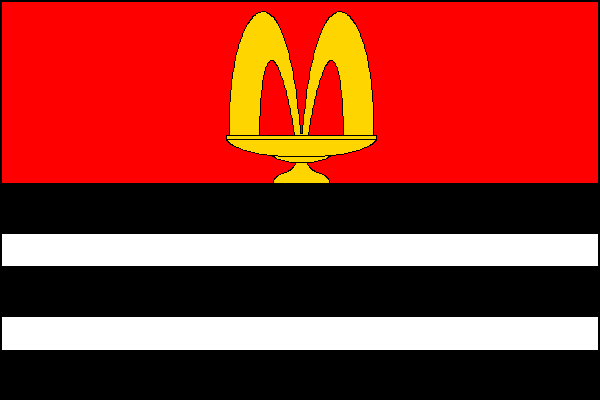
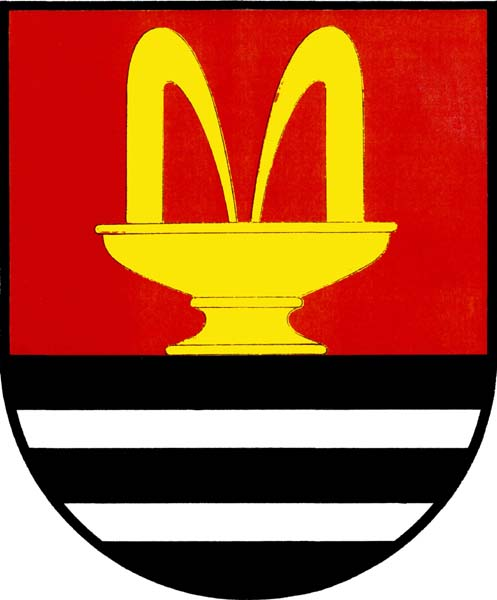
- Flag Coat of arms

- Location in the Czech Republic
- Coordinates: 50°21′25″N 15°50′30″E
- Country: Czech Republic
- Region: Hradec Králové
- District: Náchod
- First mentioned: 1389

Area
  - Total: 7.99 km^{2} (3.08 sq mi)
- Elevation: 302 m (991 ft)

Population (2026-01-01)
  - Total: 777
  - Density: 97.2/km^{2} (252/sq mi)
- Time zone: UTC+1 (CET)
  - Summer (DST): UTC+2 (CEST)
- Postal code: 552 11
- Website: www.obecvelichovky.cz

Velichovky is a spa municipality and village in Náchod District in the Hradec Králové Region of the Czech Republic. It has about 800 inhabitants.

== Administrative division ==
Velichovky consists of two municipal parts (in brackets population according to the 2021 census):

- Velichovky (527)
- Hustířany (195)

== Etymology ==
The oldest form of the name was Velichov. It was derived from the personal name Velich, meaning "Velich's". Soon after its first appearance, the name was changed to its present form, which is diminutive and plural of Velichov.

== Geography ==
Velichovky is located about 23 kilometres (14 mi) west of Náchod and 16 km (10 mi) north of Hradec Králové. It lies in the East Elbe Table. The highest point is the flat hill Za Kostelem at 327 m (1,073 ft) above sea level. The stream Hustířanka flows through the Hustířany village.

== History ==
The first written mention of Velichovky is from 1389.

== Demographics ==
Historical population

Year	Pop.	±%
1869	830	—
1880	923	+11.2%
1890	876	−5.1%
1900	773	−11.8%
1910	772	−0.1%

Year	Pop.	±%
1921	770	−0.3%
1930	730	−5.2%
1950	744	+1.9%
1961	686	−7.8%
1970	656	−4.4%

Year	Pop.	±%
1980	662	+0.9%
1991	690	+4.2%
2001	747	+8.3%
2011	737	−1.3%
2021	722	−2.0%

Source: Censuses

== Economy ==
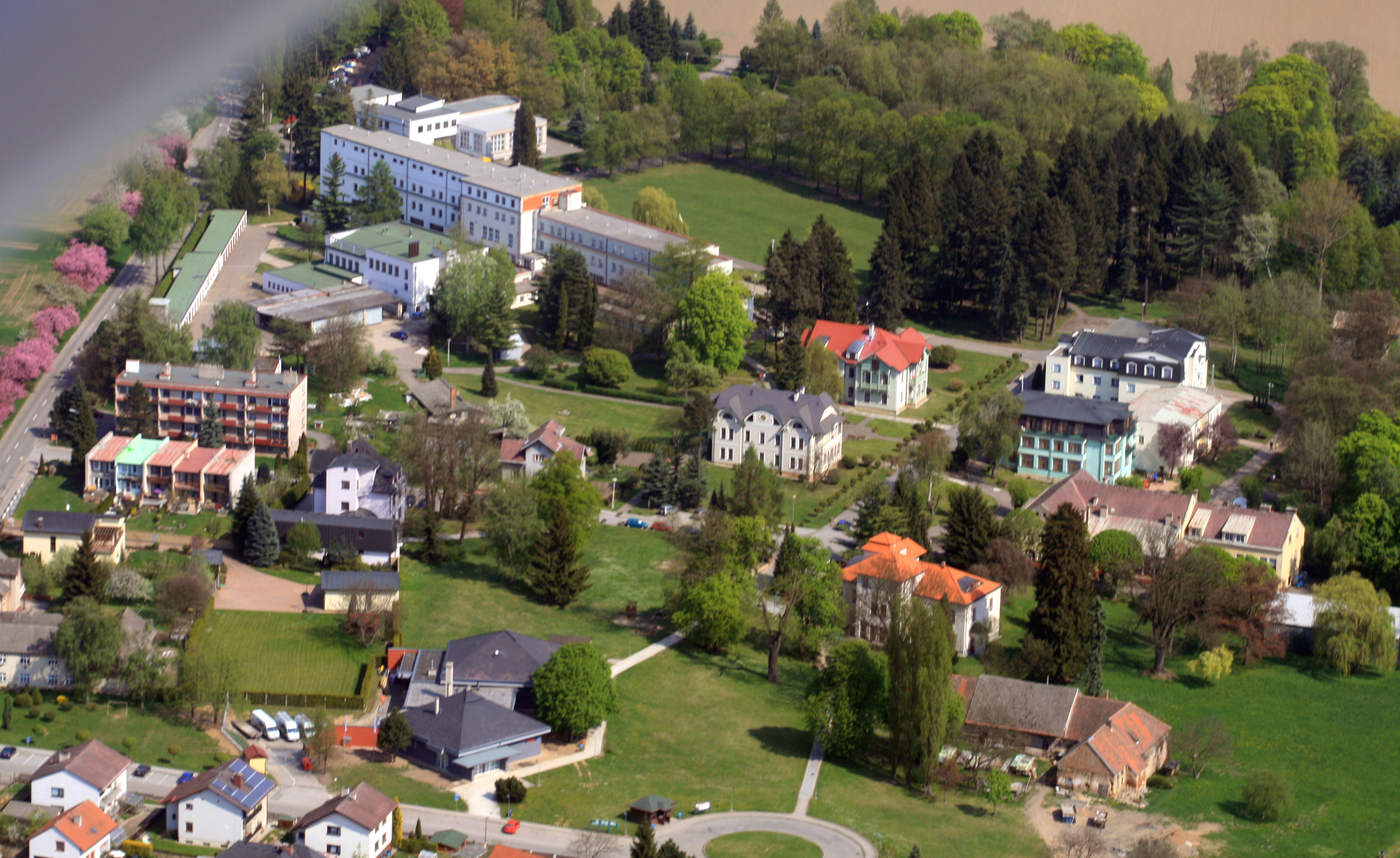
Spa buildings

Velichovky is known for a peat spa, which was founded in 1897. It focuses on rehabilitation and treatment of musculoskeletal disorders.

== Transport ==
There are no railways or major roads passing through the municipality.

== Sights ==
The main landmark of Velichovky is the Church of the Transfiguration. It was built in the Renaissance style in 1616.

The main spa building is a large house, built in the Functionalist style in 1923. For its architectural value, it is also protected as a cultural monument.

== Notable people ==
- Bavor Rodovský mladší of Hustířany (c. 1526 – c. 1600), alchemist

== Twin towns – sister cities ==
Velichovky is twinned with:

- Jedlina-Zdrój, Poland
