= Radostov =

- Municipality
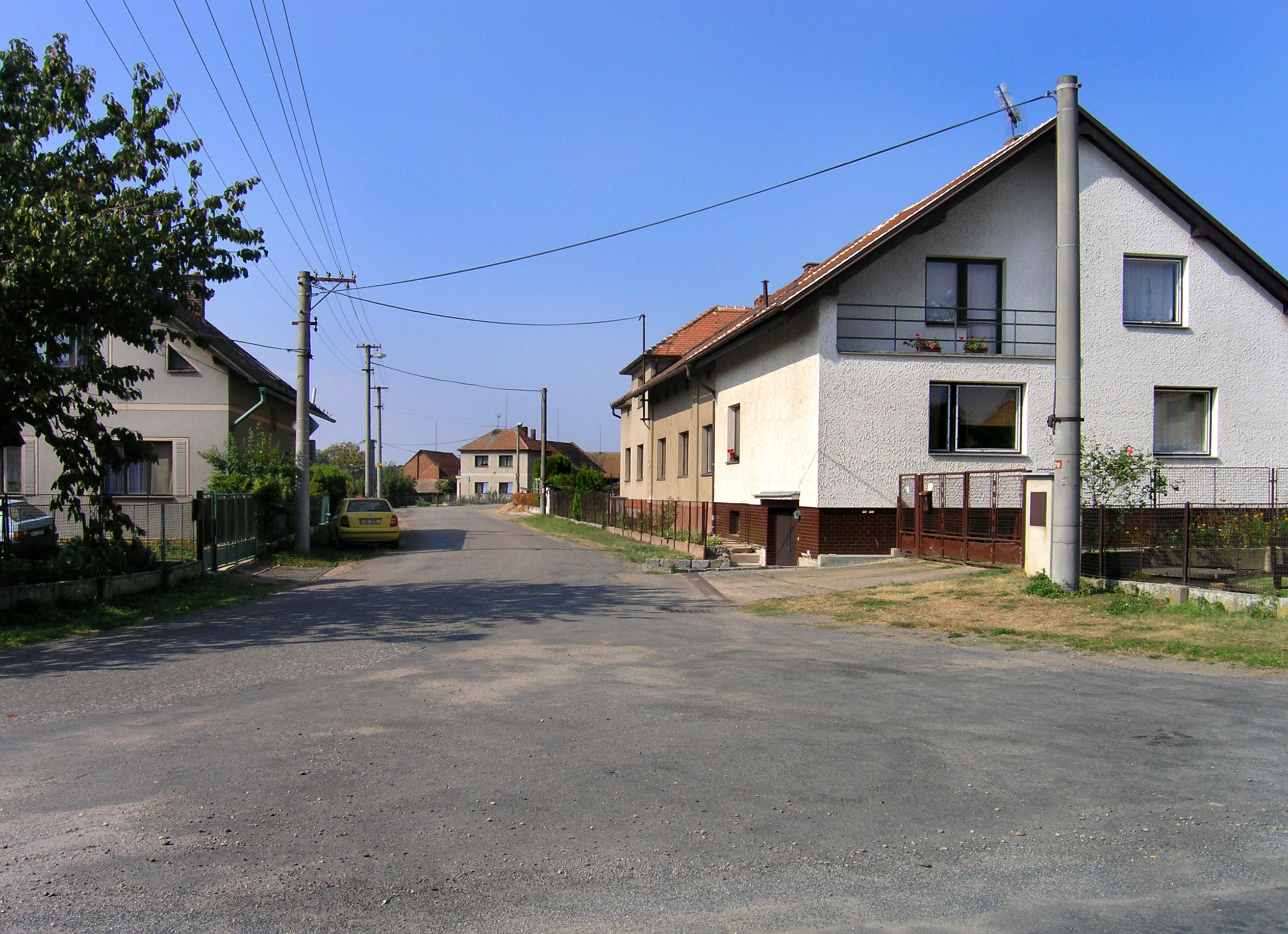
- Western part of Radostov

- Flag Coat of arms

- Location in the Czech Republic
- Coordinates: 50°12′35″N 15°39′49″E
- Country: Czech Republic
- Region: Hradec Králové
- District: Hradec Králové
- First mentioned: 1395

Area
  - Total: 3.88 km^{2} (1.50 sq mi)
- Elevation: 243 m (797 ft)

Population (2026-01-01)
  - Total: 134
  - Density: 34.5/km^{2} (89.4/sq mi)
- Time zone: UTC+1 (CET)
  - Summer (DST): UTC+2 (CEST)
- Postal code: 503 27
- Website: www.radostov.cz

Radostov (German: Radistau) is a municipality and village in Hradec Králové District in the Hradec Králové Region of the Czech Republic. It has about 100 inhabitants.

== Demographics ==
Historical population
Year	Pop.	±%
1869	227	—
1880	217	−4.4%
1890	210	−3.2%
1900	215	+2.4%
1910	226	+5.1%
1921	202	−10.6%
1930	181	−10.4%
1950	168	−7.2%
1961	181	+7.7%
1970	147	−18.8%
1980	142	−3.4%
1991	105	−26.1%
2001	111	+5.7%
2011	133	+19.8%
2021	137	+3.0%
Source: Censuses
