= Dorothy Layton (suffragist) =

English suffragist and politician (1887–1959)

- from the book "Dorothy"
- Born: Eleanor Dorothea Osmaston; 4 October 1887; Hampstead, London, England
- Died: 18 March 1959 (aged 71)
- Education: Newnham College, Cambridge
- Organization(s): National Union of Women's Suffrage Societies, Fabian Society
- Spouse: Walter Layton (m. 1910)
- Children: 3
- Parent(s): Francis Beresford Osmaston; Eleanor Margaret Field
- Relatives: Francis Wright (great-grandfather)

Dorothy Layton, Lady Layton (born Eleanor Dorothea Osmaston; 4 October 1887 – 18 March 1959) was an English suffragist and politician. She was active in the Liberal Party after some women were given the vote in 1918. She supported the ideas of family allowance and family planning.

== Life ==
Layton was born in Hampstead in 1887. She was the first of three children born to the suffragist Eleanor Margaret and Francis Plumptre Beresford Osmaston. Her father was a barrister and they lived in Limpsfield, Surrey.

Her parents arranged her education at various places until a bequest enabled her to attend Julia Huxley's Prior's Field School where she made friends with Julian and Aldous Huxley. She went on to attend Newnham College, Cambridge, in 1906 where she continued her suffragism by joining the non-militant National Union of Women's Suffrage Societies (NUWSS). Her mother was also a suffragist and during the 1906 general election the two of them were in Surrey canvassing voters in Limpsfield to sign a suffrage petition.

Layton also joined the Fabian Society, captained the cricket team, played piano and studied history and economics. She was a member of a group of friends that Virginia Woolf called the "neo-pagans". The group included Rupert Brooke, Helen Verrall, Noël Olivier, Margery Olivier, Bill Hubback, Eva Spielman, Jerry Pinsent and Dolly Rose. She graduated and she would have gained a degree in 1909 but women were not permitted to be awarded University of Cambridge degrees at this time.

In 1910 she married one of her economics lecturers. They had three children in three years and during those years Dorothy sold the NUWSS paper Common Cause each week in Cambridge. She took to public speaking in 1913 during the Great Pilgrimage as suffrage supporters travelled from across the UK to meet in Hyde Park on 26 July. As they walked one of the eight NUWSS routes she would speak in villages as they passed.

Her husband was an active member of the Liberal Party but Dorothy refused to join because of their poor support for the suffrage cause. She became an enthusiastic supporter of the party after 1918 when some women were given the vote. Lloyd George considered her the more radical member of their marriage and their house did not have alcoholic drinks because of her objection to them. In 1925 she was elected to the League of Nations Union executive.

She went to India in 1929 and that country as well as family planning received her enthusiastic advocacy.

In February 1937 she joined a tour of Romania, Czechoslovakia and Yugoslavia with Eleanor Rathbone and Katharine Stewart-Murray, Duchess of Atholl. This was covered in the media although there was nothing official about the visit by these three. They observed the conditions and they were received by the Czech deputy Františka Zeminová in Prague. Deputy Zeminová used the occasion to laud the support of Britain for her country during the events that were to lead up to Germany's invasion. Her greatest influence was also in 1937 when she persuaded the Women's Liberal Federation to back the idea of family allowances, which led to the party supporting family allowances.

In 1959, she died of cancer and her husband wrote an account of her life. It was published in 1961 with the simple title of Dorothy. He would die in 1966.
