= Incomes Data Services =

British research organisation

- Company type: Subsidiary
- Industry: Employment information
- Founded: 1966
- Defunct: March 31, 2015
- Headquarters: London, United Kingdom
- Key people: David Layton, founder
- Owner: Thomson Reuters / Sweet & Maxwell
- Number of employees: 12
- Website: www.incomesdata.co.uk

Incomes Data Services (IDS) was a British research organisation dedicated to employment-related areas.

Acquired by Thomson Reuters in September 2005, it was dedicated to providing original research, analysis and training on pay benchmarking, pay settlements, HR policy and practice, pensions law and practice, and employment law. IDS published numerous journals and books, had several subscription websites, and undertook contract research. In December 2014, Thomson Reuters announced its decision to close the business effective 31 March 2015, discontinuing the pay and HR products.

The employment law products – namely IDS Employment Law Brief, IDS Employment Law Handbooks, and IDS Employment Law Cases – continue to be published by Thomson Reuters and are available online through the Westlaw service.

== History ==
IDS was founded by David Layton in 1966 with the aim of providing accurate and timely information which could be put to practical use by all those involved in determining pay, benefits and related employment policies in Britain. The company was the first to provide this information. As the employment law field became more complex, IDS launched more information services covering new areas.

IDS was acquired by Thomson-owned Sweet & Maxwell in September 2005.
