= Harry Bruce bibliography =

- Books↙: 22
- Articles↙: 62
- Scripts↙: 1
- Interviews↙: 3

Harry Bruce (8 July 1934 – 18 August 2024) was a Canadian writer and journalist who published articles in newspapers and magazines across Canada, as well as 22 books. The following lists his non-fiction and biographical works, together with selected articles and interviews.

== Books ==
Year	Title	Publisher	Identifiers	Notes
1968	The Short Happy Walks of Max Macpherson	Macmillan of Canada	ISBN 0-0021-1621-9; LCCN 77-393685; OCLC 3868180	
1975	Nova Scotia	A. Hawke	ISBN 0-8888-2006-2; LCCN 74-84530; OCLC 670371759	
1977	Lifeline: The Story of the Atlantic Ferries and Coastal Boats	Macmillan of Canada	ISBN 0-7705-1608-4; OCLC 4010392	
1979	The Story of R.A. Jodrey, Entrepreneur	McClelland & Stewart	OCLC 872643159	
1982	A Basket of Apples: Recollections of Historic Nova Scotia	Oxford University Press	ISBN 978-0-1954-0393-0; OCLC 9616608	
1984	Each Moment as it Flies	Methuen Publishing	ISBN 0-4589-8170-2; OCLC 15154987	
1984	The Gulf of St. Lawrence	Oxford University Press	ISBN 0-1954-0452-1; OCLC 1019284591	
1985	Movin' East: The Further Writings of Harry Bruce	Methuen Publishing	ISBN 0-4589-9670-X; OCLC 16060525	
1985	Frank Sobey: The Man and the Empire	Macmillan of Canada	ISBN 978-0-9208-5262-0; OCLC 12388767	
1987	A Century at Central Trust: The Story of its Growth	Nimbus Publishing	ISBN 0-9208-5291-2; OCLC 16182151	
1988	Down Home: Notes of a Maritime Son	Key Porter Books	ISBN 1-5501-3098-6; OCLC 25245655	
1991	Atlantic Canada	Key Porter Books	ISBN 1-5501-3268-7; OCLC 28674631	
1992	Maud: The Life of L.M. Montgomery	Seal Bantam Books	ISBN 978-0-5535-6584-3; OCLC 30657162	
1995	Corporate Navigator: The Life of Frank Manning Covert	McClelland & Stewart	ISBN 978-0-7710-1709-4; OCLC 35879734	
1997	The Pig that Flew: The Battle to Privatize Canadian National	Douglas & McIntyre	ISBN 978-1-5505-4609-5; OCLC 38536116	
1997	An Illustrated History of Nova Scotia	Nimbus Publishing	ISBN 978-1-5510-9219-5; OCLC 967787963	
2000	Tall Ships: An Odyssey	Key Porter Books	ISBN 978-1-5526-3157-7; OCLC 44152233	
2002	Never Content: How Mavericks and Outsiders Made a Surprise Winner of Maritime Life	Key Porter Books	ISBN 978-1-5526-3496-7; OCLC 49977863	
2009	Page Fright: Foibles and Fetishes of Famous Writers	McClelland & Stewart	ISBN 978-0-7710-1713-1; OCLC 503042189	
2020	Halifax and Me	Pottersfield Press	ISBN 978-1-9897-2517-7; OCLC 1159241221	
2021	The Perfect Day and Other Stories	Pottersfield Press	ISBN 978-1-9897-2537-5; OCLC 1220951027	
2024	Characters Along the Road	Pottersfield Press	ISBN 978-1-9907-7061-6; OCLC 1429036826	

== Articles ==
Date	Title	Publication	Notes	References
1968 March	Trials of a WASP in Backwoods Quebec	The Star Weekly	Republished in Each Moment as it Flies	
1968 August	It Was Gala Day, and Gorgeous Violence Filled the Night	The Star Weekly	Republished in Each Moment as it Flies	
1968 September	Ghosts of Summers Past	The Star Weekly	Republished in Each Moment as it Flies	
1970 April	I Saw Him Fall, and the Time Will Not Come Round Again	Maclean's	Republished in Each Moment as it Flies	
1970 May	He Had a Bird in a Plastic Bag, and Oil, Baby, Oil	Maclean's	Republished in Each Moment as it Flies	
1970 December	Through the Noise, and Glorious Garbage, You CAN See the Atlantic	The Globe Magazine	Republished in Each Moment as it Flies	
1971 September	Maybe There's a Secret Only Maritimers Know	Saturday Night	Republished in Each Moment as it Flies	
1972	The Unacknowledged Lost Generation Drops Out at Forty. Or Forty-five	This Country in the Morning	Republished in Each Moment as it Flies	
1972	Things I Never Got to Do	This Country in the Morning	Republished in Each Moment as it Flies	
1972 September	It's Beautiful, but Don't Eat the Clams	Saturday Night	Republished in Each Moment as it Flies	
1973	Thwack! Pock! Summer Is Back in the Blood	This Country in the Morning	Republished in Each Moment as it Flies	
1973 February	Toronto Islands in Winter	Toronto Life	Republished in Each Moment as it Flies	
1973 May	The Most Competitive Man I've Ever Known	Weekend Magazine	Republished in Each Moment as it Flies	
1973 July	A Fire Took the Nest: A Hammer Took the Birds	The Toronto Star	Republished in Each Moment as it Flies	
1973 July	The Alchemy of Sailing. Don't Call It a Sport	Maclean's	Republished in Each Moment as it Flies	
1973 October	November	This Country in the Morning	Republished in Each Moment as it Flies	
1973 October	Here's Looking at You, Joey	Maclean's	Republished in Each Moment as it Flies	
1973 October	North America's Best Schooner Builder	Weekend Magazine	Republished in Each Moment as it Flies	
1973 December	The Monster That Ate Toronto	Saturday Night	Republished in Each Moment as it Flies	
1973 December	Confessions of a Failed Jock	Quest	Republished in Each Moment as it Flies	
1974 June	My Short, Grisly Career as a TV Superstar	Maclean's	Republished in Each Moment as it Flies	
1974 September	The Way We Were at Mount Allison	Maclean's	Republished in Each Moment as it Flies	
1975 June	Is Unrequited Love the Best?	Maclean's	Republished in Each Moment as it Flies	
1975 June	Love Letter to the Art of Tying Knots	Maclean's	Republished in Each Moment as it Flies	
1975 November	The Fine Art of Familiarity	The Canadian	Republished in Each Moment as it Flies	
1976 April	The Lady Was for Burning	The Canadian	Republished in Each Moment as it Flies	
1976 July	Riding on The Ocean Limited: Or, Feds, Spare That Train!	The Canadian	Republished in Each Moment as it Flies	
1976 November	Johnny Canuck Is a Yuk	Saturday Night	Republished in Each Moment as it Flies	
1976 December	Allan J. MacEachen: At home with New Zealand's Bluenosers	Axiom: Atlantic Canada's Magazine	vol.3 (1) pp. 10–13, 25	
1977 May	Remember The Heap: She Served Us Well	The Canadian	Republished in Each Moment as it Flies	
1977 November	Max MacPherson Walks Again	The City	Republished in Each Moment as it Flies	
1978 January	The Spanish Have a Word for What We Need	The Canadian	Republished in Each Moment as it Flies	
1978 January	United We Stand, Divided We Fall—Frozen Stiff	The Canadian	Republished in Each Moment as it Flies	
1978 April	Loser Ali	The Canadian	Republished in Each Moment as it Flies	
1978 May	Alas for the Creaky Senior Citizens of Sport	The Canadian	Republished in Each Moment as it Flies	
1978 August	Labour Day Is a Dreaded Bell in the Schoolyard of the Mind	The Canadian	Republished in Each Moment as it Flies	
1978 October	What's a Child Worth in the Era of the Blabbermouth?	The Canadian	Republished in Each Moment as it Flies	
1978 December	Christmas Blues	The Canadian	Republished in Each Moment as it Flies	
1978 December	Are the Doves of Barbados Any Different from the Pigeons of Bay Street?	Saturday Night	Republished in Each Moment as it Flies	
1979 January	Gordie Howe 50; Pundits 0	The Canadian	Republished in Each Moment as it Flies	
1979 February	Future Fantasy	The Canadian	Republished in Each Moment as it Flies	
1979 May	Thanks, but I'd Rather Have a Hot Bath	The Canadian	Republished in Each Moment as it Flies	
1979 August	Why Must a Man Smell Like Rotting Flowers in a Cemetery?	The Canadian	Republished in Each Moment as it Flies	
1979 September	The Short, Sweet Summer of a Forty-Five-Year-Old Gut-Shooter	The Canadian	Republished in Each Moment as it Flies	
1980 January	"Stay a While," He Said	Today	Republished in Each Moment as it Flies	
1980 April	The Glory That Was Crete	Atlantic Insight	Republished in Each Moment as it Flies	
1980 August	Out of Step with the Times but Still Keeping Time with My Wife	Today	Republished in Each Moment as it Flies	
1980 August	Dear Statistics Canada. Here's an Answer to Question Eight	Today	Republished in Each Moment as it Flies	
1980 August	"God Loves Seniors, but Who Loves the Old?	Today	Republished in Each Moment as it Flies	
1980 September	The Relief of Retreat to a Perfect Outhouse	Today	Republished in Each Moment as it Flies	
1980 October	Hold the Day, Kids. It'll Never Come Again	Today	Republished in Each Moment as it Flies	
1980 December	New Year's Is a Bummer! Auld Acquaintance Should Be Forgot	Today	Republished in Each Moment as it Flies	
1981 February	Joys of the Outhouse	Atlantic Insight	Republished in Each Moment as it Flies	
1981 December	The most important realist painter of the Western World	Atlantic Insight	Foundation Award for Culture, National Magazine Awards; Republished in Each Moment as it Flies	
1982	How I Lost the Jogging Faith on a Bad Day at Black Rock Beach	Quest	Republished in Each Moment as it Flies	
1982 May	Florida? Are You Kidding?	Atlantic Insight	Republished in Each Moment as it Flies	
1982 July	Halifax Is a City to Dance in	Atlantic Insight	Republished in Each Moment as it Flies	
1982 July	"Scotia's Darling Seat": The Glory of Edinburgh	Atlantic Insight	Republished in Each Moment as it Flies	
1982 November	The fiery baptism of Alexa	Atlantic Insight	Best Magazine Article; Atlantic Journalism Awards	
1983 March	The Softball Was Always Hard	Quest	Republished in Each Moment as it Flies	
1983 September	Raise a glass, if you please, to the Dalhousie Law School!	Atlantic Insight	Best Magazine Article; Atlantic Journalism Awards	
1983 March	He's a Lifelong Failure at Basic Mathematics	Atlantic Insight	Republished in Each Moment as it Flies	
1984 July	A Domestic Fable for our Times	Atlantic Insight	Toronto-Dominion Bank Award for Humour; Republished in Each Moment as it Flies	

== Scripts ==
Year	Title	Broadcaster	Notes	References
1976	Word from an Ambassador of Dreams		Radio drama	

== Interviews ==
Date	Title	Interviewer
31 March 1987	Journalist Bruce says newspapers in Atlantic region are improving	Wallie Sears, Times-Transcript
24 September 2009	Ten Questions with Harry Bruce	Open Book: Toronto
October 2010	The Art of the Story	Marjorie Simmins, Halifax Magazine
