= James Cranswick Tory =

Canadian businessman and politician (1862–1944)

The Honourable James Cranswick Tory
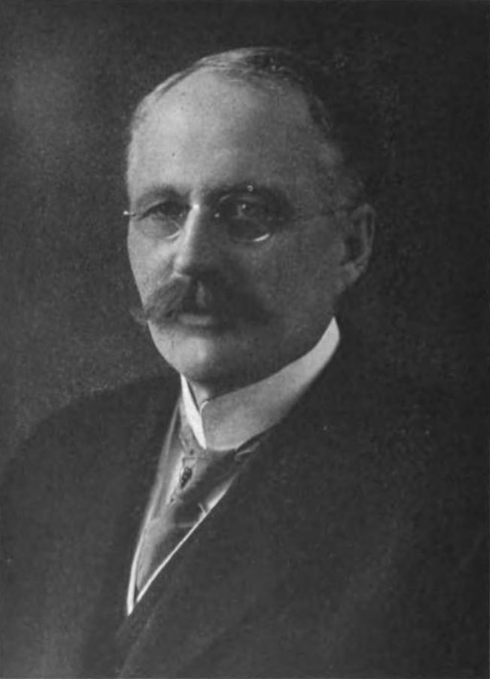
- Portrait of J.C. Tory in 1914

14th Lieutenant Governor of Nova Scotia
- In office September 14, 1925 – November 19, 1930
- Monarch: George V
- Governors General: The Viscount Byng of Vimy; The Viscount Willingdon
- Premier: Edgar Nelson Rhodes; Gordon Sidney Harrington
- Preceded by: James Robson Douglas
- Succeeded by: Frank Stanfield

MLA for Guysborough County
- In office June 14, 1911 – June 25, 1925 Serving with James F. Ellis, Clarence W. Anderson
- Preceded by: James F. Ellis; William Whitman
- Succeeded by: Simon Osborn Giffin; Howard Amos Rice

Personal details
- Born: October 24, 1862 Port Shoreham, Nova Scotia
- Died: June 26, 1944 (aged 81) Halifax, Nova Scotia
- Party: Liberal
- Spouse: Caroline Whitman (m. 1894)
- Parent(s): Robert Kirk Tory; Anorah Fergusson
- Relatives: Henry Marshall Tory (brother); Charles Tory Bruce (nephew)
- Education: McGill University
- Occupation: Businessman
- Profession: Politician

James Cranswick Tory (October 24, 1862 – June 26, 1944) was a Nova Scotian businessman and politician. He was born in 1862 to Robert Kirk Tory and Anorah Ferguson in Port Shoreham, Nova Scotia and later lived in the village of Guysborough, attending school there. He later moved to Montreal and attended McGill University. Tory joined the Sun Life Assurance Company as an insurance agent in 1891 and quickly moved through up the ranks of the company. He worked the West Indies, Michigan, and later at head office in Montreal, where he held one of the highest executive positions in the company.

Tory served as a Liberal MLA for Guysborough County in the Nova Scotia House of Assembly from 1911 to 1925. He was a minister without portfolio in the province's Executive Council from 1921 to 1925. In 1923, he was asked to succeed George Henry Murray as Premier of Nova Scotia, but declined. Tory was appointed the 14th Lieutenant Governor of Nova Scotia and served from 1925 to 1930. He died in Halifax on the 26 June 1944.

Tory's younger brothers were Henry Marshall Tory, founding president of the University of Alberta and the National Research Council of Canada, and John Alexander Tory Sr. (1869–1950), a fellow director at Sun Life. In 1894, he married Caroline Whitman of Canso; they had no children.

== Early life and education ==
Tory was born on October 24, 1862 in Port Shoreham, Nova Scotia to parents Robert Kirk Tory and Anorah Fergusson. He was the eldest of five children, and had two brothers and two sisters. As a teenager he moved to the nearby town of Guysborough to attend the Guysborough Academy, while also working at a local general store. After finishing school at age 18, Tory became First Officer on a ship sailing between Halifax and Montreal, working for the Whitman family of Canso. He later settled in Montreal and attended McGill University.

== Career ==
=== Sun Life Assurance ===
==== Early career ====
In 1891, Tory joined the Sun Life Assurance Company of Canada as a life insurance agent for the company's first branch outside of Canada, in the West Indies. After a trip around the territory, he was made the company's Superintendent for the West Indies in 1892. Tory would tour the islands, arranging meetings in churches, schools or public halls to introduce people to the idea of life insurance. 35 years later, he said the following of his time working in the West Indies:

I had more temerity then than I have now, I had the courage that sometimes springs from abysmal ignorance; I was lucky however in talking to audiences who knew even less of what I was talking about than I did myself.

In 1894, Sun Life Assurance was seeking to establish a presence in the United States to counter the US insurance companies operating in Canada. Detroit, Michigan was selected as the location of the company's first US office. Tory had returned from a trip to the West Indies in 1894, and was offered a promotion as head of the company's interests in the Far East by T.B. Macaulay. Tory was not interested in the proposal and was instead offered the task of establishing the Michigan office, which he accepted. His younger brother John Alexander Tory took up his position as Superintendent for the West Indies. The Michigan office was opened early in 1895, and by 1897 several subsidiary offices had been opened around the state.

==== Executive office ====
In July 1897 Tory returned to head office in Montreal, being succeeded once again by his younger brother. Following his return to Montreal, he was made a Superintendent of Agencies. While Superintendent, Tory began a program of circulating a monthly letter commending insurance agents whose success had warranted special attention. This created healthy competition for a place on the list, and improved morale of the company's employees. He continued in this role until 1901, when a long and serious illness made him temporarily retire. When Tory returned to work the following year he entered into a personal contract with the company. He was tasked with supervising and administering all operations in Central America, South America, and the West Indies. His title became General Manager of the Western Foreign Department, and he continued in this role until 1914, when the Western Foreign Department was merged with the head office.

In 1915, Tory was appointed General Manager of Agencies, one of the highest executive positions in the company. He set about reorganizing the structure of the company's head office, creating two territorial divisions; One for North America, and one for Europe, Latin America, and Asia. These territories were subdivided further as operations expanded around the globe. In 1923, an Agency Executive committee was established with Tory as chairman, composed of the various superintendents and supervisors of the company. In 1925, Tory resigned as an executive official when he was appointed Lieutenant Governor. He was elected to the board of directors of Sun Life in 1927, and remained on the board until his retirement in 1934.

=== Provincial politics ===
==== Member for Guysborough ====
In 1910, Tory, who was spending his summers in Guysborough, was asked by the Guysborough district Liberals to be their candidate for MLA, replacing William Whitman. In 1911, he was elected MLA for Guysborough alongside James F. Ellis of Sherbrooke. Later in 1911, Tory was involved in a minor controversy after he discussed a meeting between Premier George Henry Murray and railway contractor Clifford Fielding with James W MacDonald, a store owner in Sherbrooke. MacDonald alleged in newspapers that Murray has swore at Fielding, and that Fielding had made significant promises regarding the construction of the railway. Tory responded and subsequently denied details of the story in the press.

In 1914, Tory spoke in favour of developing hydro power in Nova Scotia. He was reelected along with Ellis again in 1916, and then was reelected for a third time in 1920 alongside Clarence W. Anderson. In 1921, Tory was made a member of the Executive Council of Nova Scotia.

==== Candidate for Premier ====
In late 1921, Premier George Henry Murray, who had been in office since 1896, announced his intention to retire due to long term illness. He delayed his retirement throughout 1922 but by the end of the year was considering his successor. The top contender was Ernest Howard Armstrong, Minister of Works and Mines, who had served as Acting Premier twice during Murrays tenure, but was seeking a Supreme Court appointment instead. Tory was the second choice, and was willing to take up the premiership, but wanted time to clear his commitments to Sun Life. Murray decided to convince Armstrong to accept the premiership instead of waiting for Tory, and succeeded in convincing him.

Between 19 and 24 January, newspapers across the country widely reported either that Tory had been asked to serve as his successor and was expected to accept, or that the matter was already settled and Tory was to be made Premier. However, on 25 January 1923, the Lieutenant Governor MacCallum Grant announced that Murray had advised him to appoint Armstrong as the next President of the Executive Council of Nova Scotia, and by extension Premier. Tory remained in his position as Minister without Portfolio. Tory and Anderson lost their seats as MLAs for Guysborough in the 1925 provincial election, in which 26/29 Liberal seats were lost.

==== Lieutenant Governor of Nova Scotia ====
On 12 January 1925, MacCallum Grant resigned as Lieutenant Governor. Newspapers reported the next day that both former Premier Murray and Minister Tory were being considered as successors. On January 14, James Robson Douglas was appointed Lieutenant Governor, but resigned on 14 September, only 9 months into his governorship. Tory was appointed Lieutenant Governor of Nova Scotia on 24 September, and was sworn in on 30 September. Tory was Lieutenant Governor during the dissolution of the Legislative Council of Nova Scotia. He resigned as Lieutenant Governor in November 1930, and was succeeded by Frank Stanfield.

=== Other activities ===
In February 1910, he was admitted to the Montreal Board of Trade, and remained a member for a number of years. In January 1925, he was made Chairman of the Westmount School Board. He was also a governor of the Wesleyan Theological College.

== Later years and death ==
Following his retirement as Lieutenant Governor, Tory lived the rest of his life at his residence on Young Street in Halifax. He maintained a summer residence at his Belmont Estate in Guysborough. He continued his passion for gardening as a hobby, as well as being a yachtsman when in Guysborough. In 1932, he published a collection of his speeches in the legislature and as Lieutenant Governor titled Legislative and Other Addresses. He dedicated the book to his mother, Anorah. By 1934, Tory was once again in ill-health, leading to his resignation from the board of directors of Sun Life. Tory died in Halifax in 1944, aged 81.

A portrait of him hangs in the Tupper Building, Dalhousie University, Nova Scotia.

== Personal life ==
Tory married Caroline Emma Whitman of Canso, daughter of his former employer, in 1894. They had no children.

== Honours ==
Tory was granted arms by the crown in 1925. He also received several honorary doctorate degrees. Upon his retirement from the board of Sun Life, the board passed a resolution recognizing his significant contributions to the company.
