= Charles Tory Bruce =

Canadian poet, journalist and fiction writer

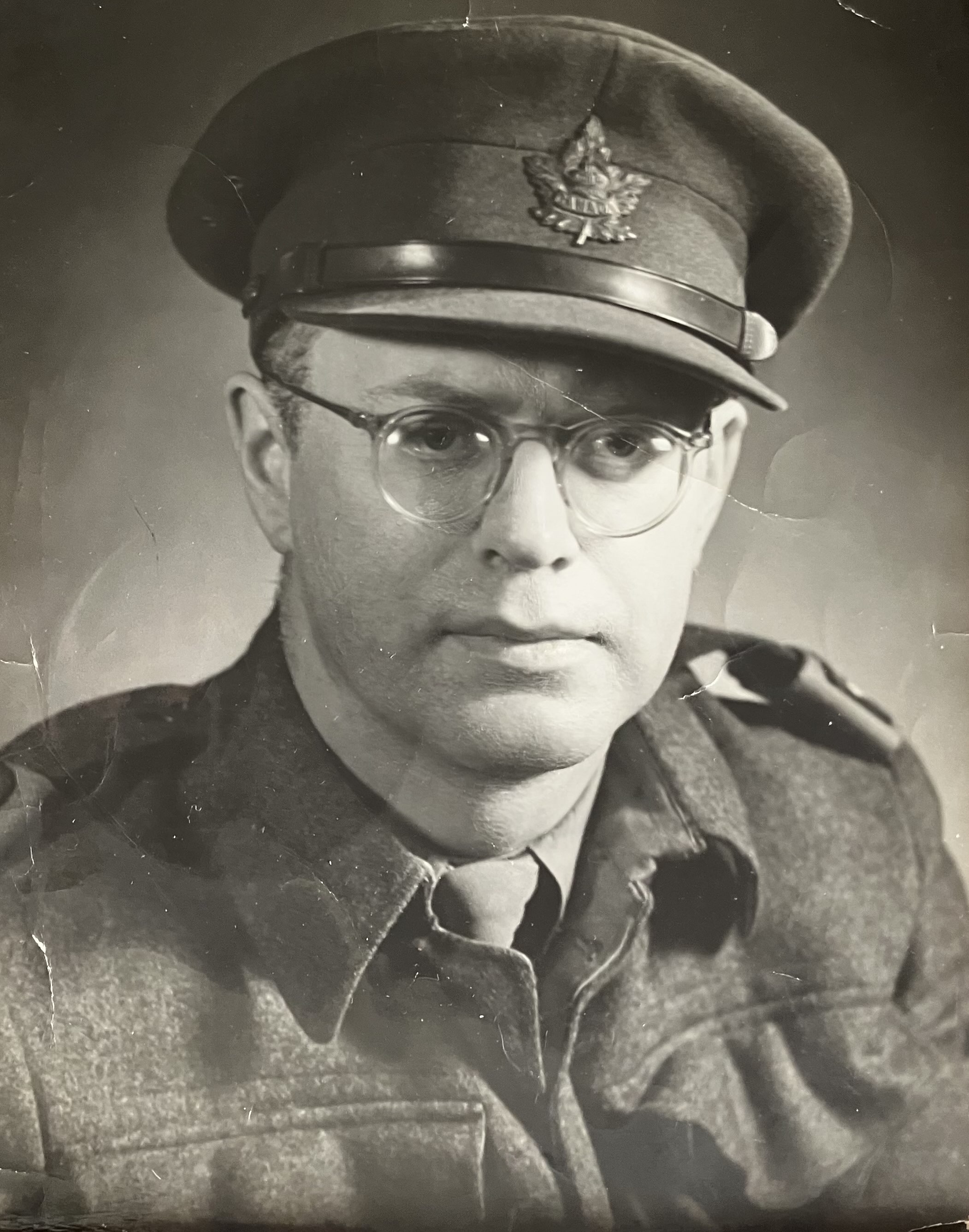
- Charles Bruce in uniform, 1944
- Born: May 11, 1906; Port Shoreham, Nova Scotia, Canada
- Died: December 19, 1971 (aged 65); Toronto, Ontario, Canada
- Resting place: Boylston United Church Cemetery
- Education: Mount Allison University
- Occupations: Poet, novelist, journalist
- Spouse: Agnes King (1929–1971)
- Children: 4
- Relatives: James Cranswick Tory (Uncle); Henry Marshall Tory (Uncle); Harry Bruce (Son)
- Writing career
- Language: English
- Period: 1920s–1960s
- Genre: Historical
- Notable work: The Mulgrave Road
- Notable awards: Governor General's Award for English-language poetry or drama (1951)

Charles Tory Bruce (May 11, 1906 – December 19, 1971) was a Canadian poet, journalist and fiction writer. Born and raised in Port Shoreham, Nova Scotia, he attended Mount Allison University and joined the Canadian Press in 1928. In 1944, he served as a war correspondent. He rose through the CP hierarchy to become general superintendent in 1945 until his retirement in 1963.

As a creative writer, he published the poetry collections Wild Apples (1927), Tomorrow's Tide (1932), Personal Note (1941), Grey Ship Moving (1945), The Flowing Summer (1947), and The Mulgrave Road (1951), the novel The Channel Shore (1954) and the short story collection The Township of Time (1959). He was most noted for The Mulgrave Road, which won the Governor General's Award for English-language poetry or drama at the 1951 Governor General's Awards.

His poetry also appeared in magazines such as Harper's, Saturday Night, Canadian Poetry and The Saturday Evening Post. Mount Allison University awarded him an Honorary Doctor of Letters in 1952, and the year after his Governor General's Award win he served as a judge in the same category.

His final book, a history of the Southam News company titled News and the Southams, was published in 1968.

== Life ==
=== Childhood ===
Charles Bruce was born in Port Shoreham, Nova Scotia to William Henry Bruce and Sarah Jane Tory. He was his parents' fifth child, and first boy. His childhood friends, Harold MacIntosh and Wilbur Cummings, describe him as being just like other local boys, but also slightly different in that he was "always in the books". From grades one through ten Bruce attended a one-room schoolhouse in Port Shoreham, near MacPherson Lake. At age 13, he entered his first poetry competition: a limerick contest in the Halifax Evening Echo. His poem won the prize of $1 and was published by the paper on 21 February 1920.

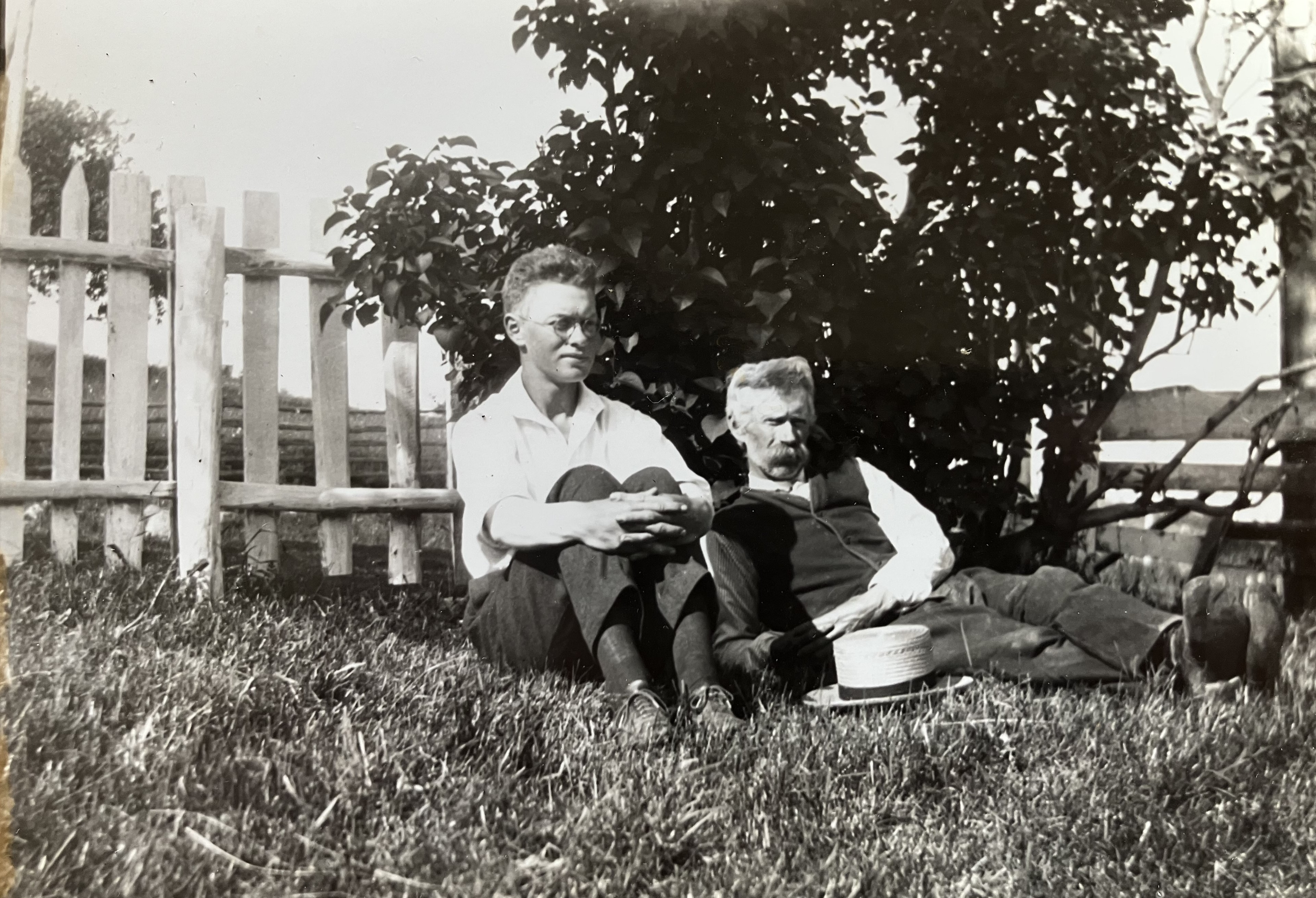
Charles Bruce and his father William at home in Port Shoreham, mid 1920's.

=== Education ===
Bruce left home to attend Mount Allison University in 1923 and graduated in 1927. During his time at Mount Allison, he contributed to the campus magazine, the Argosy. He was Assistant Editor of the Argosy for the 1925–1926 school year. On 24 April 1926, he was unanimously elected as editor-in-chief of the Argosy for the 1926–1927 school year. Bruce paid for the publication of his first poetry collection, Wild Apples, in 1927. Nine of the thirteen poems of this collection had previously been published in the Argosy.

=== Career ===
==== Pre-war ====
Bruce began his career in journalism in May 1927 at the Halifax Morning-Chronicle. He worked at the Chronicle for eight months before joining the New York office of The Canadian Press. After 8 months in New York, he was transferred to the CP editorial staff at Halifax. While working in Halifax, he released his second poetry collection, Tomorrow's Tide, late in 1932. In September 1933, after five years with CP in Halifax, he was transferred CP's Toronto bureau. In 1936, he was promoted from assistant news editor to news editor of CP. In 1937, he was promoted again to general news editor for Canada.

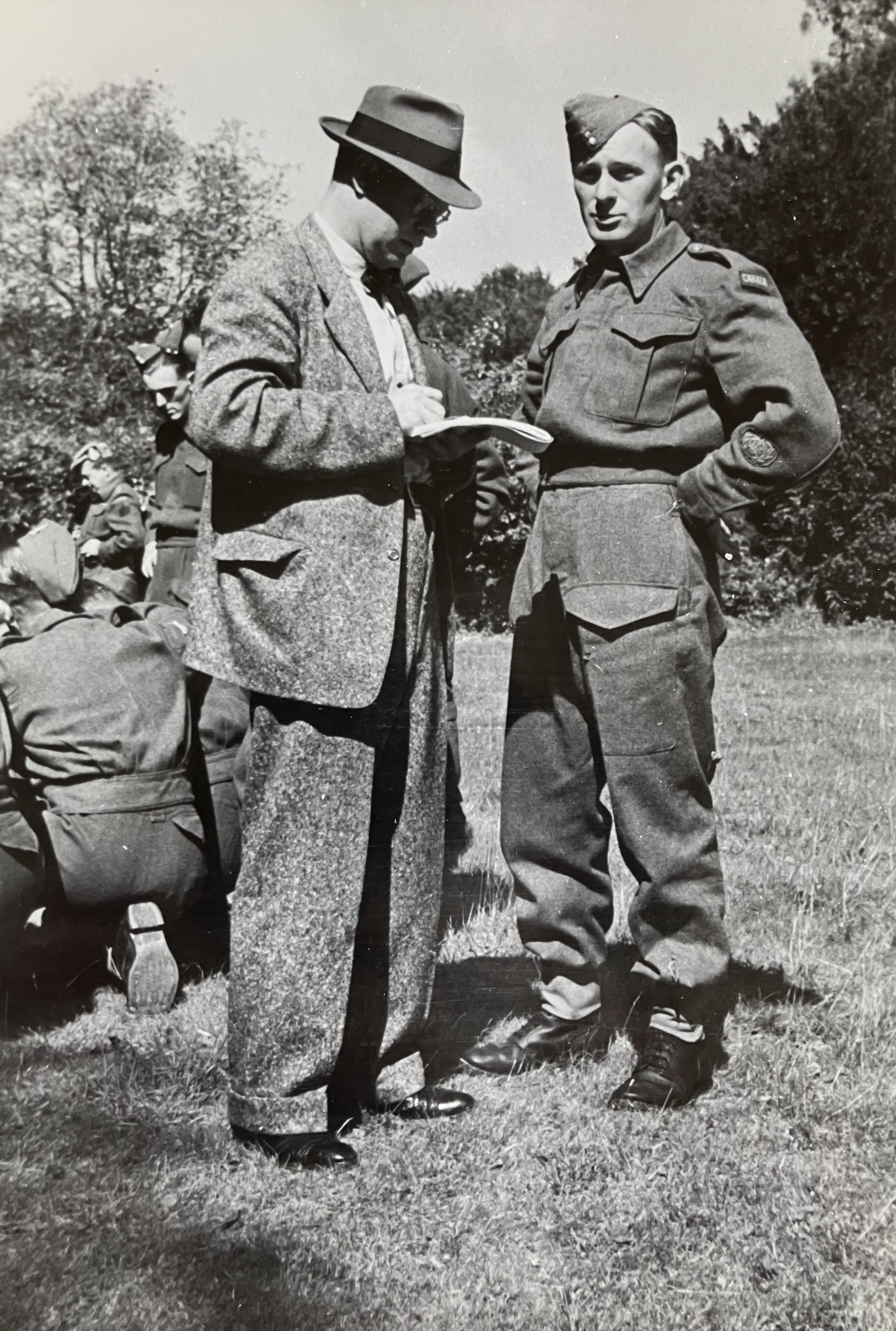
Charles Bruce interviewing a Canadian soldier, 1942.

==== War correspondent ====
In February 1944, Bruce temporarily left his position as general news editor to become superintendent of the CP London bureau, arriving to take up his new position in March. In September 1944, he was asked by the Air Ministry if he would like to personally cover the flights dropping supplies to Allied airborne troops during Operation Market Garden. His first and only flight was on 20 September 1944, he wrote about his experience as follows:

Our pilot, Doug Robertson, took his big plane straight and low over the dropping zone through a literal hell of flak. The bomb aimer, Norman Roseblade, let go the cannisters, "bang on". Robbie pulled her nose up and to port, heading out of the area. In a moment the navigator, Lem Prowse, would be calling in a course for home. Then the flak slammed into us. It hit "P for Peter" with the shock of a giant fist. For a split second the aircraft seemed steady on her course. then she went into a screaming nosedive.

Robertson managed to recover the aircraft, but they were too close to the ground to parachute and still over enemy territory. The crew managed to bring the aircraft back over friendly territory and crash land in Belgium. A signal was sent to the aircraft's home base to confirm that all were safe, but it did not get through. Bruce filed a dispatch from Brussels confirming he was alive, but it did not reach London until after he arrived back at his office on 22 September. Robertson, Roseblade, and Prowse were killed in action a few months after the incident. Bruce returned to Canada in July 1945.

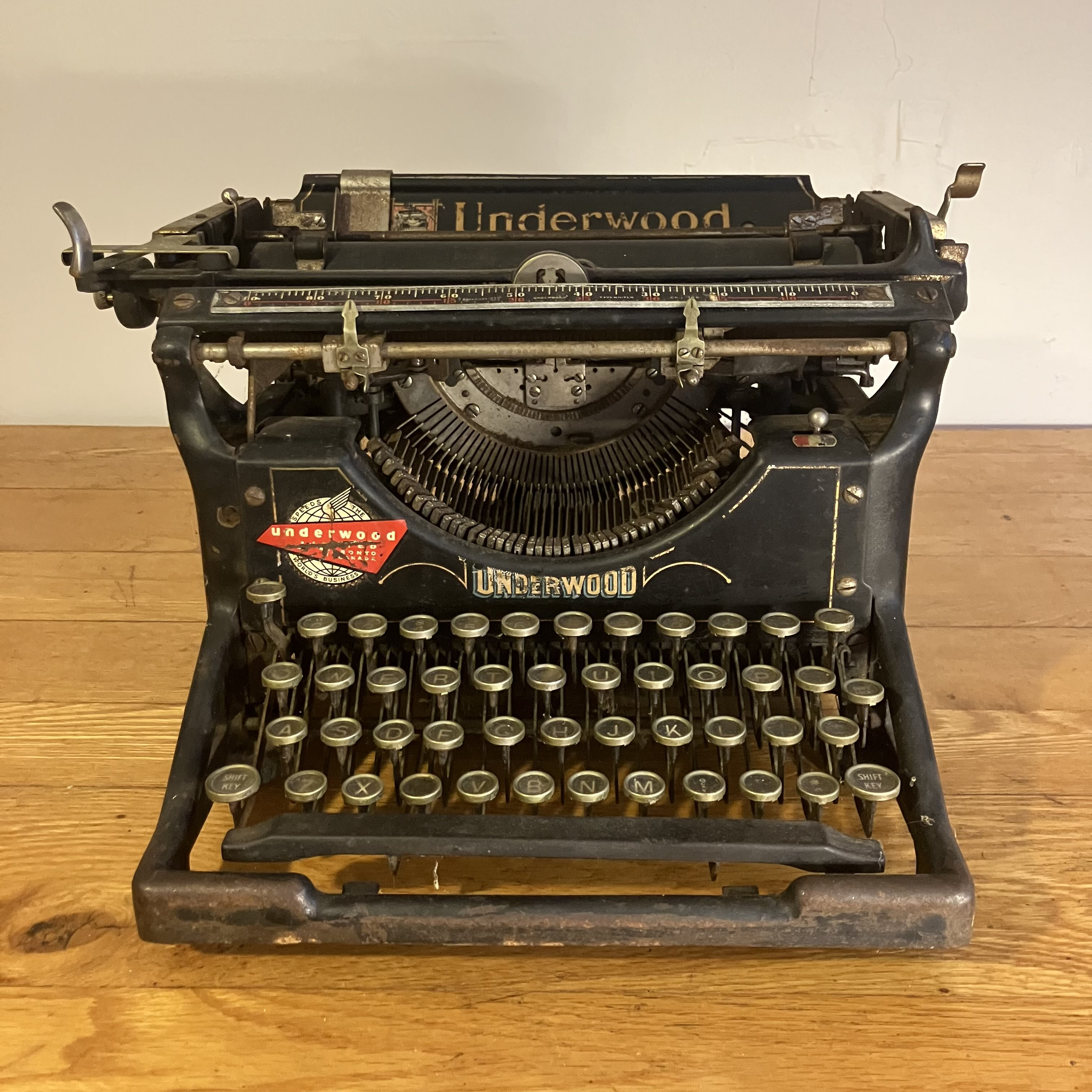
The Underwood Number 5 typewriter used by Charles Bruce and later his son Harry Bruce.

==== Post-war ====
Upon his return to Toronto, Bruce was made general superintendent of the Canadian Press. His third poetry collection, Grey Ship Moving, was published November of that year. Grey Ship moving was shortlisted for the Governor General's Award for English-language Poetry or Drama in the 1946 Governor General's Awards. In 1947, he released his next poetry collection, The Flowing Summer. The collection was inspired by his son Alan's visit to Port Shoreham in the Summer of 1943. His final poetry collection, The Mulgrave Road, was published in 1951, and was awarded the Governor General's Award for English-language Poetry or Drama at the 1951 Governor General's Awards.

His first work of fiction, The Channel Shore, was on the shortlist for the Governor General's Award for English-language fiction at the 1954 Governor General's Awards. His second work of fiction, The Township of Time (1959), was collection of short stories from the same setting as The Channel Shore. He is credited with being the primary creator of the Canadian Press Style Book.

Bruce retired from the Canadian press on 11 May 1963, his 57th birthday Shortly after his retirement, he accepted an offer from Southam News to write a history of the organization. The book, titled News and the Southams, was published in 1968. Over the next three years, Bruce began working on another work of fiction. Despite his health declining considerably in 1970, he completed a 313-page draft of this novel titled The Drift of Light.

Bruce died on 19 December 1971, in Toronto. He is buried near his family homestead in Boylston, Nova Scotia.

=== Personal life ===
Charles married Gladys Agnes King on 13 December 1929 in Halifax, Nova Scotia. They had four sons: Alan (b.1931), Harry (b.1934), Andrew (b.1937), and Harvey (b.1950).

== Legacy ==
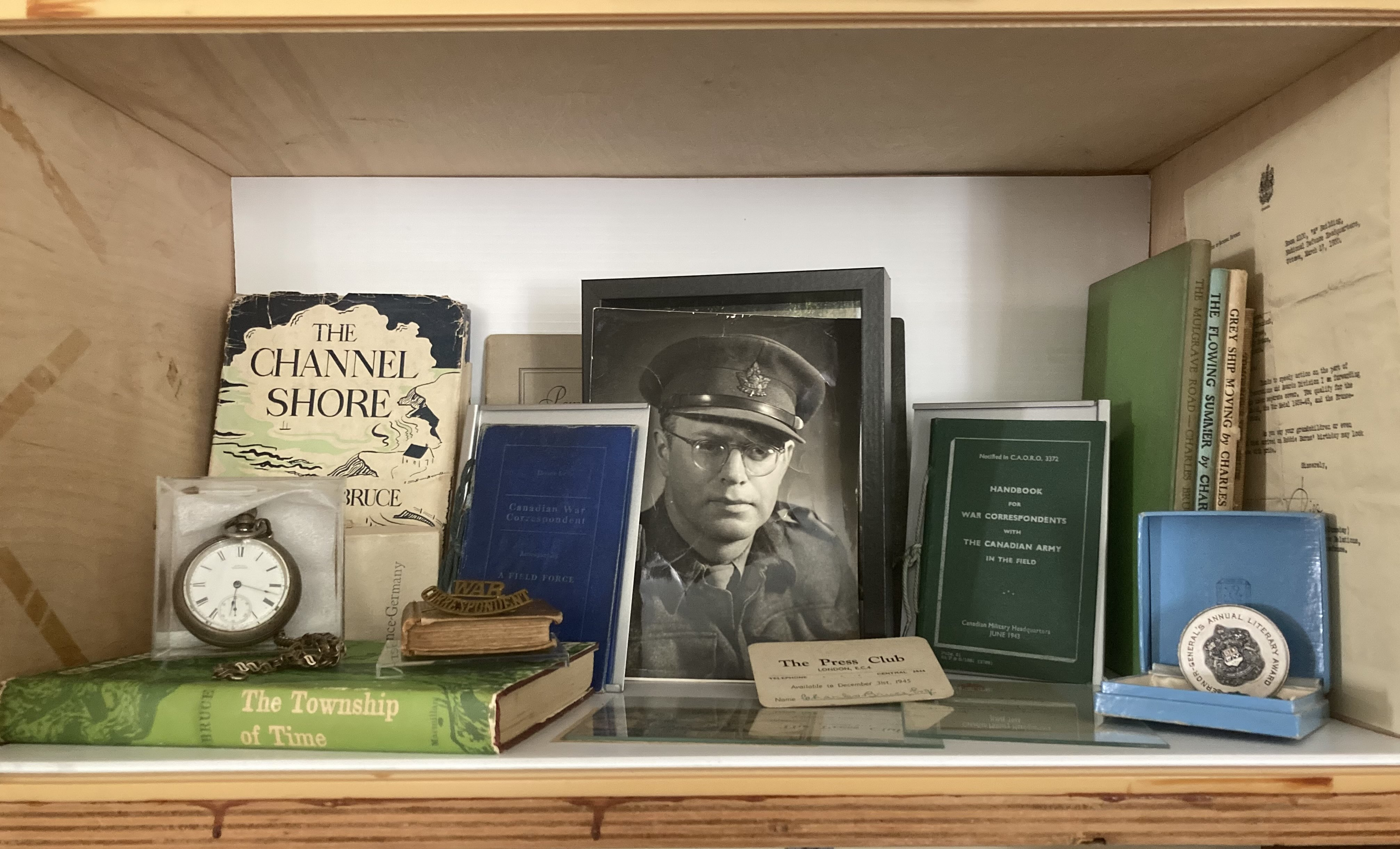
Exhibit of artifacts relating to Charles Tory Bruce, including original copies of his published works, his Governor Generals Award, and items from his wartime service.

Several of Bruce's works have been republished after his death. The Mulgrave Road: Selected Poems of Charles Bruce was compiled by Andrew Wainwright and Lesley Choyce, with a foreword by his son, Harry Bruce. Wainwright went on to publish Charles Bruce: A Literary Biography, a biography of Bruce focusing on his career as a creative writer, in 1988.

For the 150th anniversary of Canadian Confederation in 2017, the Nova Scotia Library Association included The Channel Shore in its list of 150 Books of Influence. An anonymous reader is quoted as saying:

"It defines the culture, the history, the people of eastern Nova Scotia. As summarized by Thomas H. Raddall, "You don't read this book. You live it."

The Porcupine's Quill published The Essential Works of Charles Bruce in 2018, selected by Carmine Starnino. In 2024, an exhibit of artifacts pertaining to Bruce's life was displayed at the Old Court House Museum in Guysborough, Nova Scotia.

== Works ==
=== Poetry ===
- (1927) Tribune Press: Wild Apples
- (1932) Tribune Press: Tomorrow's Tide
- (1941) Macmillan: Personal Note
- (1945) Ryerson: Grey Ship Moving
- (1947) Ryerson: The Flowing Summer
- (1951) Ryerson: The Mulgrave Road

=== Books ===
- (1954) Macmillan: The Channel Shore
- (1959) Macmillan: The Township of Time (short stories)
- (1968) Macmillan: News and the Southams (non-fiction)

== See also ==
- List of writers from Nova Scotia
- List of Canadian journalists
