= Port Shoreham, Nova Scotia =

Community in Nova Scotia, Canada

Coordinates: 45°25′25.52″N 61°25′14.82″W

Port Shoreham in Nova Scotia

Port Shoreham is an unincorporated community in the Canadian province of Nova Scotia, in the Municipality of the District of Guysborough in Guysborough County. It is notable for its provincial park, fishing on Macpherson Lake, and being the birthplace of several notable Canadians.

Port Shoreham, its people, and their lifestyle was the inspiration for Charles Tory Bruce's award winning poetry collection The Mulgrave Road (1951), his novel The Channel Shore (1954), and his short story collection The Township of Time (1959).

== Geography ==
Port Shoreham lies along Route 344 on the northern shore of Chedabucto Bay.The community is bordered by the Clam Harbour River on the west, and Clam Harbour Bay to the south.

=== MacPherson Lake ===
Aside from Clam Harbour Bay, a dominant geographical feature of the area is MacPherson Lake. The shore of the lake has a significant number of seasonal residences and cottages. The lake is stocked with fish for recreational fishing, and a yearly fishing derby is held.

== History ==
Port Shoreham was first inhabited by the indigenous Mi'kmaq. The Mi'kmaq name for the area was E'se'katik, meaning "at the place of the clams", referencing the abundant clams in Clam Pond.

In October 1765, the area known today as Port Shoreham was part of the 20,000-acre land grant given to Benjamin Hallowell of Boston for settlement. No significant progress on surveying or settling these lands were made until it passed to his two sons, Benjamin Hallowell Jr., and Ward Nicholas Boylston.

=== Clam Harbour and Ragged Head ===
Surveying was completed in 1786, with the Port Shoreham area divided up into 150 acre lots. Settlers were primarily Loyalists from New England, and British soldiers from disbanded units in the aftermath of the American Revolutionary War. Some early settlers also came directly from England, Scotland, and Ireland. The first settler was Alexander Cummings, a disbanded soldier from the 71st Regiment of Foot who arrived in 1785. He was joined in the 1790s by James Bruce, an immigrant from Scotland. More settlers began arriving in the early 19th century, primarily to work in the booming timber trade. With the collapse of the regions timber trade in 1818, the settlers turned to farming and fishing. The settlement was known as Clam Harbour, a translation of the Mi'kmaq name for the area. Before the establishment of municipal government, the community was administered as part of the Manchester Township within Sydney County, and later as part of Guysborough County when it was created in 1836.

Around 1830, the eastern half of the settled area became known as Ragged Head, with schoolhouses being built in both communities. John McKay operated an unofficial postal way office out of his home in Clam Harbour from 1841 to 1855. In 1855, Richard Bruce opened a provincial way office at his home in Clam Harbour, but the post office was named the Ragged Head post office and served both communities. He was appointed postmaster for the community as part of the newly formed federal postal service Royal Mail Canada in 1868.

In 1867, Samuel McMaster deeded land for a new schoolhouse in Clam Harbour. A board of trustees was appointed consisting of David McMaster, Charles J. Bruce, and Edward Lipsett. The school served both Clam Harbour and Ragged Head. The school house burned down in 1906, and a new school was built the following year in 1907. In the 1870s, Thomas B. MacIntosh ran a dry goods and fishery supply store in Clam Harbour. In 1881, Henry Tory and his wife deeded land to the local Methodist church community, and a church was built later that year.

=== Port Shoreham ===
In 1901, men from both Clam Harbour and Ragged Head submitted a petition to merge the two communities to avoid postal confusion with Clam Harbour, Halifax County. The name was then changed through a provincial act of legislature to Port Shoreham. The post office was subsequently renamed from Ragged Head to Port Shoreham.

Around 1902, Albert Richardson moved to the area and built a new sawmill on the river running from MacPherson Lake to Clam Pond. This mill operated until 1939. He also opened a general store, which was later taken over by the Whitman family, and remained open until 1946. Following the closure of the Whitman store, Wilbur Cummings opened a store in 1947 and closed it in 1980. In 1925, the Methodist church in Port Shoreham and neighboring Congregationalist church in Manchester joined the United Church. The school in Port Shoreham closed in 1964, with all students being bused to larger communities. The United church in Port Shoreham ended services in 1974, and was torn down a shortly after.

The road running through the community was known as the "Mulgrave Road" as it went from Boylston to Mulgrave. This road was paved and turned into Route 344 in the late 1960s. The population was 193 in the 1911 census, 132 in the 1921 census, and 76 in 1954.

== Attractions ==
Port Shoreham Beach Provincial Park

== Notable residents ==
- Robert Kirk Tory (1838-1892) Methodist minister and farmer, progenitor of the Tory family.
- Henry Marshal Tory (1862-1944) Founder of several Canadian universities, and the National Research Council
- James Cranswick Tory (1864-1947) Lieutenant Governor of Nova Scotia and Member of the Legislative Assembly for Guysborough
- John Alexander Tory Sr (1869-1950) Head of Ontario operations for the Sun Life Insurance Company, father of John Stewart Donald Tory.
- Charles Tory Bruce (1906–1971) Canadian poet, journalist, and writer
- Harry Bruce (1934–2024) Canadian journalist and writer
