= Executive Council (Canada) =

Executive branch of the Canadian federal government

Executive councils in the provinces of Canada are constitutional organs headed by the lieutenant governor and composed of the ministers in office. The executive branch of the Canadian federal government is not called an executive council; instead, executive power is exercised by the Canadian Cabinet who are always members of the King's Privy Council for Canada.

A Council's informal but functioning form is the Cabinet, headed by a provincial premier, who holds de facto power over the body. The Executive Council in Canadian provinces is composed only of ministers in office, and is the official body by which the Cabinet's constitutional advice is given to the lieutenant governor. That is, it serves the same function provincially as the Privy Council does federally, except that the Executive Council does not have the ceremonial role of directly advising the Monarch, proclaiming their successors, or assenting to some royal marriages.

These are the:

- : Executive Council of Alberta
- : Executive Council of British Columbia
- : Executive Council of Manitoba
- : Executive Council of Newfoundland and Labrador
- : Executive Council of New Brunswick
- : Executive Council of Quebec
- : Executive Council of Nova Scotia
- : Executive Council of Ontario
- : Executive Council of Prince Edward Island
- : Executive Council of Saskatchewan

== In the territories ==
Canadian territories also have councils. These are the:

- : Executive Council of Yukon
- : Executive Council of the Northwest Territories
- : Executive Council of Nunavut
