= MacCallum Grant =

Canadian businessman and politician (1845–1928)

The Honourable MacCallum Grant
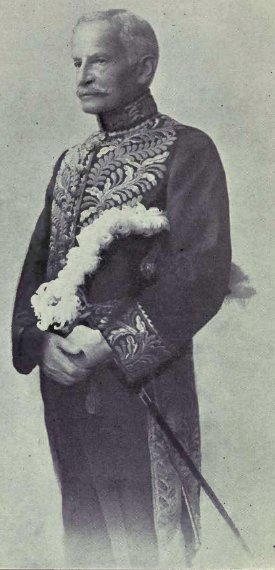

12th Lieutenant Governor of Nova Scotia
- In office November 29, 1916 – January 12, 1925
- Monarch: George V
- Governors General: The Duke of Devonshire; The Lord Byng of Vimy
- Premier: George Henry Murray; Ernest Howard Armstrong
- Preceded by: David MacKeen
- Succeeded by: James Robson Douglas

Personal details
- Born: May 17, 1845 Hants County, Nova Scotia
- Died: February 23, 1928 (aged 82) Halifax, Nova Scotia
- Party: Conservative
- Spouse: Laura MacNeill Parker (m. 1887)
- Children: Eric MacNeill Grant; Gerald Wallace Grant; Margaret Frances MacNeill Grant; John Moreau Grant; Grainger Stewart Grant; Harold Taylor Wood Grant
- Profession: Businessman

MacCallum Grant (May 17, 1845 – February 23, 1928) was a Canadian businessman and the 12th Lieutenant Governor of Nova Scotia.

== Early life ==
Born at Loyal Hill (in the area of Summerville) in Hants County, Nova Scotia, the son of John Nutting and Margaret (MacCallum) Grant, Grant was educated in Newport, Nova Scotia.

== Career ==
He commenced his business career with S. A. White & Co, in 1873. He was a member of the firm Black Bros. Co. from 1875 to 1893. He then formed the firm Grant, Oxley & Company. Grant, Oxley & Company merged with Alfred J. Bell & Co. Ltd. in 1964 and still operates today under the name of Bell & Grant Insurance.

In 1899 he was appointed as Imperial Consul of Germany in Halifax. From 1916 to 1925, he served as Lieutenant Governor of Nova Scotia. He was Lieutenant Governor (Canada) at the time of the Halifax Explosion. During the 1919 visit to Nova Scotia by Edward VIII as Prince of Wales, Grant hosted the royal party at Government House (Nova Scotia).

== Personal life ==
He married Laura MacNeill Parker (a daughter of Daniel McNeill Parker) in 1887. They had five children:

- Eric MacNeill Grant - born 1889;
- Captain Dr. Gerald Wallace Grant, MC, MB, CH - born 1890;
- Margaret Frances MacNeill Grant - born 1893 (on 17 July 1918 married Arthur William La Touche Bisset);
- Captain (N) John Moreau Grant, CBE - born 1895;
- Major Grainger Stewart Grant, MC - born 1897;
- Vice Admiral Harold Taylor Wood Grant - born 1899;

He died in Halifax in 1928.

=== Honours and legacy ===
He received honorary degrees from Acadia University (LL.D.) in 1919 and from the University of King's College (D.C.L.) in 1921.

A portrait of the Honourable MacCallum Grant by Henry Harris Brown was donated to the Art Gallery of Nova Scotia in 2006 by Grant's granddaughter, Margaret H. Grant. The portrait was unveiled by the 30th Lieutenant Governor of Nova Scotia, the Honourable Myra Freeman. The portrait is on loan to Government House (Nova Scotia) and can be viewed there in the ballroom.
