= 1951 Governor General's Awards =

Canadian literary award

The 15th Governor General's Awards for Literary Merit were presented on June 13, 1952 for works of Canadian literature published in 1951. The awards in this period had no monetary prize and were just an honour for the authors.

The 1952 awards also introduced new categories, known as the University of Western Ontario President's Awards, to honour individual short works. The awards were presented in three categories, for short stories, poems and magazine articles.

Although administered separately, the Stephen Leacock Memorial Medal for Humour also announced its winner at the same ceremony.

== Winners ==
- Fiction — Morley Callaghan, The Loved and the Lost
- Poetry or drama — Charles Tory Bruce, The Mulgrave Road
- Creative non-fiction — Josephine Phelan, The Ardent Exile
- Non-fiction — Frank MacKinnon, The Government of Prince Edward Island
- Juvenile — John Francis Hayes, A Land Divided

=== President's Awards ===
- Short story — Farley Mowat, "Lost in the Barren Lands"
- Magazine article — Blair Fraser, "The Secret Life of Mackenzie King, spiritualist"
- Poem — Earle Birney, "North Star West"

=== Stephen Leacock Award ===
- Hilda Kay Grant, The Salt Box (writing under the pseudonym Jan Hilliard)
