= Atlantic Insight =

Canadian magazine (1979–1990)

- Cover of Atlantic Insight (April 1979)
- Editor: Harry Bruce; Sharon Fraser (1986–1989)
- Categories: General interest
- Founder: Bill Belliveau (Wikidata); Harry Bruce
- Founded: 1979
- First issue: April 1979; 47 years ago
- Final issue Number: December 1989; 36 years ago Vol. 11 No. 12
- Company: Impact Publishing (1979–1982); Northeast Publications (1982–1985); Insight Publishing (1985–1990)
- Country: Canada
- Based in: Halifax, Nova Scotia
- Language: English
- ISSN: 0708-5400
- OCLC: 1080362641

Atlantic Insight was a Canadian general interest magazine for the Atlantic provinces, founded in 1979 by Bill Belliveau and Harry Bruce. The magazine had a peak circulation of 68,000 issues, eventually declining to a low of 36,000 issues by 1989. Atlantic Insight and its articles received awards from organizations such as the National Media Awards Foundation and the Atlantic Journalism Awards.

The magazine was criticized by anti-smoking groups for including full-page tobacco advertisements which were also present in issues circulated in high schools. Atlantic Insight ceased publication in 1990, with the publisher citing the federal ban on tobacco advertising effective 1 January 1989 as primary reason for the magazine's decline. The magazine never generated a profit across its ten years of publication.

== Description ==
Atlantic Insight was a general interest magazine for the Atlantic provinces, published monthly. The magazine covered regional news and events, local trends, politics, and business; the magazine also published biographical articles on entertainers and businesspeople from Atlantic Canada.

== History ==
Atlantic Insight was founded in Halifax, Nova Scotia by writer Harry Bruce and publisher and real estate investor Bill Belliveau in 1979. After working for several years in Halifax, Bruce aimed to use his connections with various freelance writers in Atlantic Canada such as Marilyn MacDonald to start an independent publication, and worked with Belliveau to establish Atlantic Insight. Belliveau commissioned a market research study which indicated that people in Atlantic Canada were purchasing over 900,000 magazines and determined a demand for a new quality magazine covering their communities. The first issue of Atlantic Insight was published in April 1979, with Bruce as the editor and Marilyn MacDonald as the managing editor.

By October 1980, Atlantic Insight was circulating 60,000 copies per month; 58,000 copies of the magazines were being sold directly to subscribers, with the balance circulated amongst newsstands. Speaking to a reporter from The Canadian Press, Belliveau predicted that sales of Atlantic Insight would soon plateau. He predicted that Atlantic Insight would not exceed 77,000 monthly sales based on average growth of magazines in the area.

In April 1981, Atlantic Insight published an article written by staffer Jon Everett titled "Chatham fights for its life", in which Everett discusses the closure of CFB Chatham and the adverse economic impact he thought would be felt by the community as a result. The article quoted remarks from the Mayor of Chatham, Edward Maher, which drew the ire of Chatham Chamber of Commerce President Richard Jardine for what he said were inaccuracies in Maher's information on CFB Chatham.

In February 1982, Atlantic Insight acquired the subscriber list of Tantramar magazine in New Brunswick after it ceased publication. Subscribers to Tantramar began receiving issues of Atlantic Insight in March 1982 as a replacement to carry out their subscriptions from Tantramar.

In October 1982, the company which owned Atlantic Insight, Impact Publishing, was placed in receivership by the Business Development Bank of Canada. Around the time Atlantic Insight entered receivership proceedings, Marilyn MacDonald became president of a new company, Northeast Publications, which purchased Atlantic Insight. Details regarding ownership of the company were not made public, however MacDonald stated in a press release that there would be "a significant element of regional ownership". The only other listed corporate officer of Northeast Publications was Peter McDonough, the husband of Nova Scotia New Democratic Party leader Alexa McDonough. Atlantic Insight would undergo another change of ownership in 1983, when Atlantic Insight publisher Jack Daley, James Sedgewick, and two associated companies purchased nearly all of the shares of Atlantic Insight. The new company also had the name Northeast Publications, and in their first press release a spokesperson from the company stated that Daley had brought Atlantic Insight back to its previous circulation of 60,000 magazines per month after a previous decline in subscriptions. In 1984, some of Harry Bruce's articles in Atlantic Insight were republished in his 1984 book Each Moment as it Flies.

Atlantic Insight was placed in receivership again in early 1985. The magazine was purchased by James Lorimer and Touche Ross, with Lorimer subsequently branching off the advertising sales department of Atlantic Insight to Daley Communications, a Halifax marketing firm owned by Jack Daley.

In 1986, a CAD$2.4M (Note: (equivalent to $6.01 million in 2025)) printing press project was announced for Saint John, New Brunswick. As a result of the new printing press, Atlantic Insight would be printed in Saint John along with telephone directories and other magazines, instead of the press they were currently using in Montreal.

Later in 1986, Sharon Fraser was appointed as the new editor of Atlantic Insight. Fraser had previously been the editor of publications such as Atlantic Fisherman and the Miramichi Leader-Weekend and had written columns for multiple newspapers in the Maritime provinces. Fraser stated at the time of her appointment that she was excited for the opportunities presented by Atlantic Insight to report on regional topics.

In 1987, the anti-tobacco smoking group Relatives of Dead and Dying Smokers published a news release expressing their concerns over circulation of the magazine in high school Maritime Studies courses in New Brunswick, Nova Scotia, and Prince Edward Island due to the presence of full-page tobacco advertisements in the magazine. Relatives of Dead and Dying Smokers requested that the education departments of the provinces in which the magazine is circulated prohibit use of the magazine in classroom settings until the tobacco advertisements were removed. They claimed to have previously reached out to the publisher of Atlantic Insight about removing the advertisements from the issues meant for circulation in schools but said they did not receive a response after six months. The news release came at a time when the federal government had recently announced a total ban on tobacco advertisements, including in magazines, effective on 1 January 1989.

Sharon Fraser left her position as editor of Atlantic Insight in March 1989. She later stated that the publisher of Atlantic Insight James Lorimer "had no consistency or clear vision" and would not allow the content, design, or vision of Atlantic Insight to be altered.

Atlantic Insight ceased operations on 4 January 1990, laying off their entire workforce of 13 people. The publisher of Atlantic Insight James Lorimer blamed the decline of the magazine on the ban on tobacco advertisements that had taken effect a year prior. Lorimer claimed the ban on tobacco advertisements cost Atlantic Insight CAD$140,000 (Note: (equivalent to $307,000 in 2025)) in ad revenue in 1989, stating that he felt the government had good reason for banning tobacco advertisements but failed to consider the economic impact it would have on publications such as Atlantic Insight. Former editor Sharon Fraser stated that she didn't believe the magazine would have been able to survive even if tobacco advertisements were not banned, as many subscribers to Atlantic Insight were not in the Maritimes and therefore the magazine lacked appeal to regional advertisers. By the time the last issue of Atlantic Insight was published in December 1989, circulation of the magazine had fallen from a peak of 68,000 issues down to 36,000 issues. Atlantic Insight never generated a profit in its decade of publication.

== Recognition ==
=== National Magazine Awards ===
Atlantic Insight and the articles it published have won awards at the National Magazine Awards:

- (1979) Foundation Directors' Awards for Outstanding Achievement by a Canadian Magazine in 1979
- (1979) Foundation Award for Culture: "Farley Mowat, Prophet" by Silver Donald Cameron
- (1979) Air Canada Awards for Travel: "Cuba is a Great Place to Visit" by Alden Nowlan

=== Periodical Distributors of Canada ===
- (1980) Outstanding Achievement by a Canadian Magazine Award: "Whistling" by Veronica Ross

=== Atlantic Journalism Awards ===
Articles published in Atlantic Insight have received awards at the Atlantic Journalism Awards:

- (1982) Best Magazine Article: "The Two Berlins" by Anne Kaptein
- (1982) Best Magazine Article: "Raise a glass, if you please, to the Dalhousie Law School!" by Harry Bruce
- (1983) Best Magazine Article: "The fiery baptism of Alexa" by Harry Bruce
- (1985) Best Magazine Article: "The Acadian nightingale starts to soar" by Harry Bruce

== Contributors ==
Some notable writers who contributed articles to Atlantic Insight include:

- Harry Bruce
- Silver Donald Cameron
- Ray Guy
- Stephen Kimber
- Alden Nowlan

== See also ==
- Atlantic Business Magazine
- Media of Canada
- List of Canadian magazines
