= Robert Kirk Tory =

Canadian methodist minister

Robert Kirk Tory was a farmer in Port Shoreham, Nova Scotia. Tory was born in Port Shoreham in 1838 to Henry Tory (1793–1881) and Ann Dieckhoff (1792–1867). He Tory married Anorah Ferguson (1835–1931) in 1861.

He was described in E.A. Corbett's biography of Henry Marshall Tory as:

"not a strong man physically, and apparently not overly ambitious, but he was genuinely beloved in the community because of his warm, kindly personality, his pawky wit and love of fun"

He had three sons and started a political family spanning Nova Scotia and Ontario:

- James Cranswick Tory (1862–1944) Lieutenant Governor of Nova Scotia and Liberal MLA
- Henry Marshall Tory (1864–1947) a McGill University and Cambridge University graduate, mathematics professor, founding president of the University of Alberta and the National Research Council of Canada
- John Alexander Tory Sr. (1869–1950) head of Ontario operations for Sun Life Insurance and father of John S. D. Tory, grandfather to John A. Tory and great-grandfather of John Tory
