= Harry Bruce (writer) =

Canadian writer and journalist

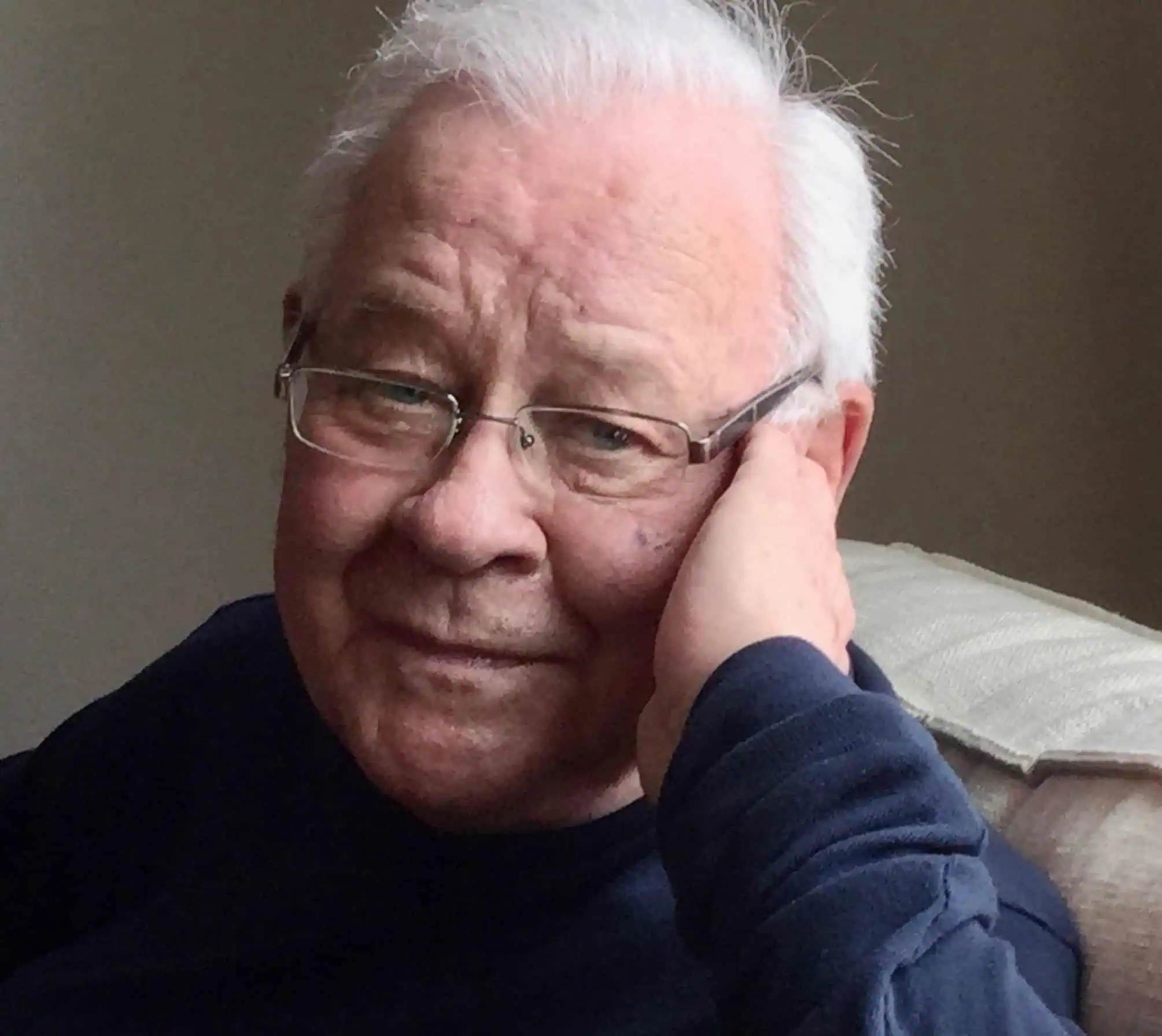
- Born: 8 July 1934; Toronto, Ontario, Canada
- Died: 18 August 2024 (aged 90); Halifax, Nova Scotia, Canada
- Education: Mount Allison University (BA)
- Occupations: Writer, journalist
- Spouse: Penny Anne Meadows (m. 1955)
- Children: 3
- Relatives: Charles Tory Bruce (Father)
- Writing career
- Period: 1955-2024
- Subjects: Historical, business
- Notable works: Lifeline (1977); Down Home (1988); An Illustrated History of Nova Scotia (1997)
- Notable awards: National Magazine Award (2); Evelyn Richardson Award (2); ACTRA Award

Signature
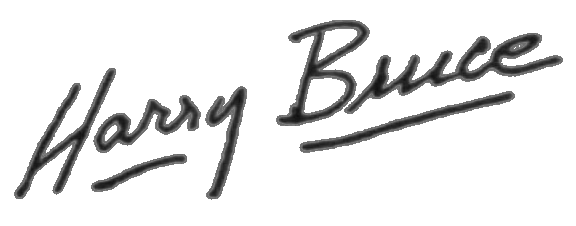

William Harry Bruce (8 July 1934 – 18 August 2024) was a Canadian writer and journalist. He attended Mount Allison University, receiving a B.A. in English Literature. He also attended the London School of Economics and Massey College at the University of Toronto. Bruce began his career as a newspaper reporter in Toronto, before moving into the magazine business. He attained editorial positions at many prominent Canadian magazines. Bruce moved to Halifax in 1971, beginning a career as a freelance writer. In 1979, he was founding editor of Atlantic Insight, a magazine focused on Atlantic Canada. Later in his career, while also a successful freelance columnist, Bruce became known as a prolific non-fiction writer. Over the course of his seven decade long career, he wrote 21 non-fiction books, and published columns in many major newspapers and magazines in Canada.

He is a recipient of four Atlantic Journalism Awards, two National Magazine Awards, one Association of Canadian Television and Radio Artists Award, two Evelyn Richardson Awards and the 2013 Atlantic Journalism Lifetime Achievement Award.

== Life ==
=== Background ===
Harry Bruce was born in Toronto on 8 July 1934 to Charles Tory Bruce and Agnes King. On his father's side, he was of Scottish ancestry from Port Shoreham, Nova Scotia. As a child, he was babysat by a young Charles Lynch, who worked alongside Bruce's father at The Canadian Press. He attended Brown Public School for his elementary education, and attended high school at Oakwood Collegiate Institute. As a boy, Bruce was exposed to writing through his father. A prominent newsman at The Canadian Press, the senior Bruce would write poetry and short stories at home on the chesterfield after work.

At the age of 18, Bruce was an officer-cadet with the Royal Canadian Navy, serving at HMCS Stadacona. He attended Mount Allison University in Sackville, New Brunswick, receiving a B.A. in English Literature in 1955. He then attended the London School of Economics from 1956 to 1957 on a scholarship. Later in his career, he attended Massey College at the University of Toronto on a Southam Fellowship from 1969 to 1970.

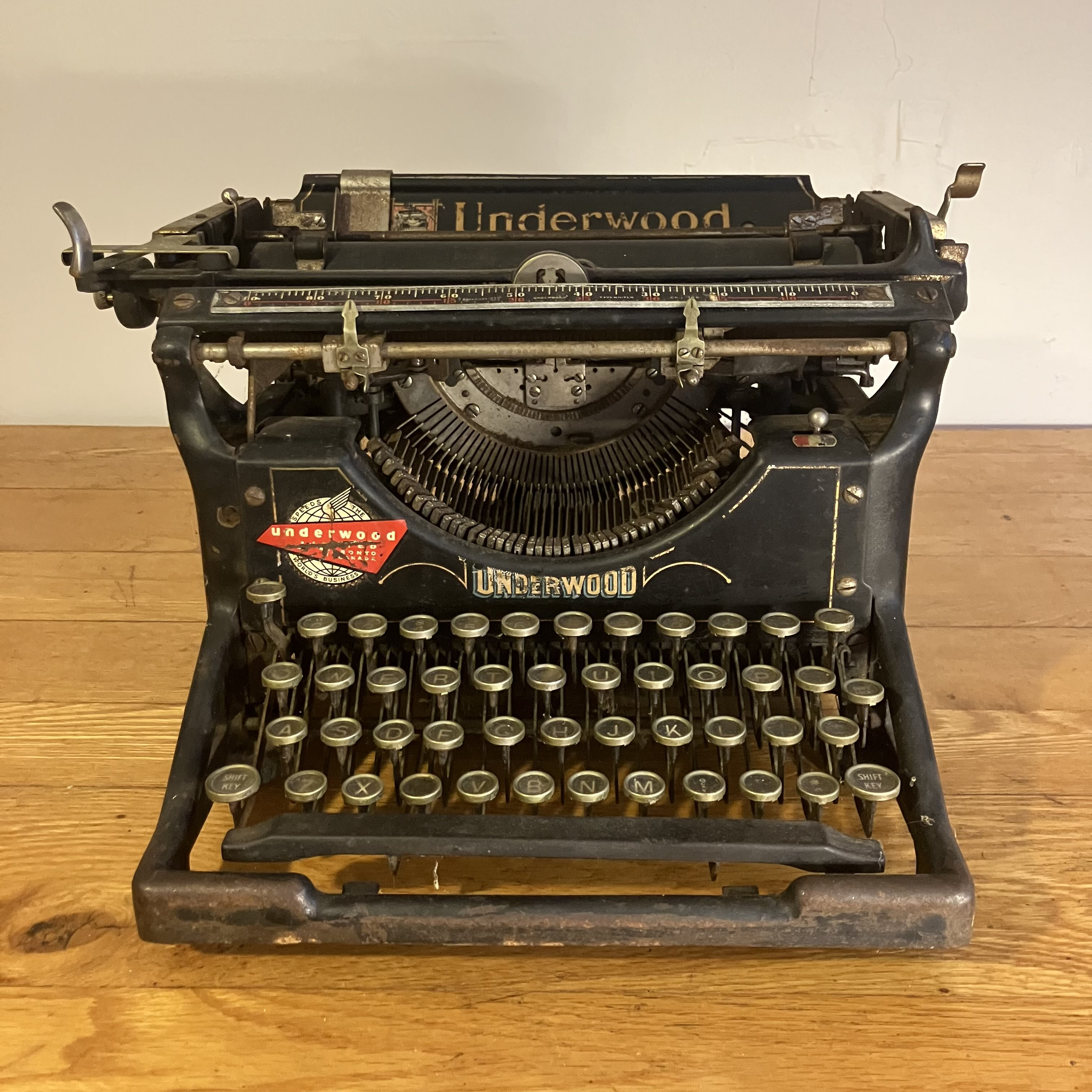
The Underwood Number 5 typewriter used by Charles Tory Bruce and later his son Harry Bruce

=== Career ===
==== Toronto ====
Fresh out of university, Bruce began his career at the Ottawa Journal. He started off as a cub reporter covering community affairs. After returning to Canada from the UK, he became the Ottawa Journal's parliamentary correspondent, joining the Canadian Parliamentary Press Gallery. Bruce left the Ottawa Journal in 1959 and became a reporter for The Globe and Mail. He left The Globe and Mail in the summer of 1961, to become a junior editor at Maclean's, and kept this position until 1964. After three years at Maclean's, he was hired as managing editor of Saturday Night from 1964–1965. He was next the founding editor of The Canadian magazine from 1965–1966, a columnist for Star Weekly in 1967, and the Toronto Daily Star in 1968.

In 1968, Bruce released his first book, The Short Happy Walks of Max MacPherson, a collection of his columns that had been published under the pseudonym Max MacPherson.

While working in Toronto, Bruce became an associate and colleague of prominent contemporary Canadian journalism and media figures such as Peter Gzowski, Robert Fulford, and Pierre Burton.

==== Halifax ====
In 1971, Bruce moved his family to Halifax, Nova Scotia. Prior to moving he had arranged a part-time job as the editor for Nova Scotia Light and Power's company magazine. He drew the ire of the provincial government for writing against their efforts to nationalize the company. In 1972, Bruce became the host of the Halifax-based CBC TV talk show Gazette for a year.

From 1973 to 1979, he took up freelance writing for the first time in his career. In 1976, Bruce was a founding board member of the Writers' Federation of Nova Scotia. That same year, Bruce received an ACTRA Award for his radio drama Word from an Ambassador of Dreams, which wove together the experiences of several generations of a family living in coastal Nova Scotia. In 1978, Bruce won the first Evelyn Richardson Non-Fiction Award for Lifeline: The Story of the Atlantic Ferries and Coastal Boats.

In 1979, Bruce was the founding editor of Atlantic Insight, and was editor in 1980 when the magazine won a National Magazine Award. Bruce stepped down as editor to become executive editor so that he could write for the magazine. At the 1981 National Magazine Awards, Bruce won the Brascan Award for Culture. His article on Alexa McDonough in the November 1982 edition of Atlantic Insight won an Atlantic Journalism Award. While a senior writer at Atlantic Insight in the mid-1980s, Bruce continued to write pieces about his regional longing for Atlantic Canada and struggle to reclaim ancestral roots as a Nova Scotian. The best of these essays were compiled in two collections Each Moment as it Flies (1984) and Movin' East (1985).

In 1985, Bruce received an honorary Doctorate of Civil Law from the University of King's College in Halifax. His 1986 biography of Frank Sobey, The Man and the Empire: Frank Sobey, was runner-up for the first National Business Book Award. In 1989, Bruce won the first annual Dartmouth Book Award for Down Home: Notes of a Maritime Son. Down Home also received the first annual Bookseller's Choice Award from the Atlantic Provinces Booksellers Association.

In 1991, Bruce received an honorary Doctorate of Law from St. Francis Xavier University in Antigonish, Nova Scotia. That same year, he became the editor of the Atlantic Salmon Federation's Atlantic Salmon Journal, and was editor until the late 90's. In 1992, Bruce released Maud: The Life of L.M. Montgomery, a biography of Lucy Maud Montgomery aimed towards younger readers, focusing on her childhood and young adult years. In 1992 and 1993, Bruce received Atlantic Journalism Awards for his periodical writing. In 1998, Bruce won his second Evelyn Richardson Non-Fiction Award for An Illustrated History of Nova Scotia. In 2000, he published Tall Ships: An Odyssey, followed by Never Content: How Mavericks and Outsiders Made a Surprise Winner of Maritime Life in 2002.

From the late 1980s to 2011, Bruce was writing opinion pieces for The Chronicle Herald and a national newspaper syndicate, Issues Network, which distributed his work to newspapers across Canada. He and several other veteran freelance columnists, including Silver Donald Cameron, walked away from the Herald after refusing to sign a new contract that meant the paper kept permanent copyright of their columns.

In 2009, Bruce released Page Fright. The book was a finalist for the 2010 Evelyn Richardson Award. In a 2010 interview, Bruce said he had a spiritual sequel to Page Fright in the works, but it was ultimately never published. In 2013, Bruce received a Lifetime Achievement Award from the Atlantic Journalism Awards.

Starting in 2020, Bruce began publishing a series of autobiographical books. The first of these was Halifax and Me, followed by The Perfect Day and Other Stories. Bruce's final book, Characters Along the Road, is primarily stories from his days as a journalist and biographer meeting and interviewing prominent Canadians of the 20th century such as John Diefenbaker, Joey Smallwood, K.C. Irving, Frank Sobey, and Max Aitken (Lord Beaverbrook). The book was at the printer when he died on August 18, 2024, in Halifax.

=== Personal life ===
Bruce married Penny Anne Meadows in Toronto on 10 September 1955. They had three children: Alec Bruce, Annabel Bruce, and Max Bruce.

His wife, Penny, typed and edited many of his columns and books. Regarding her work on Page Fright, Bruce said in a 2010 interview with Marjorie Simmins "She did the entire index for Page Fright, which is tough work, and then a thing like proofreading a 20-page bibliography. The quality and detail of my books is very much dependent on her".

In 1971, shortly after moving to Halifax, Bruce met a young Stephen Kimber in a local newspaper office. They became lifelong friends, with Bruce acting as Kimber's mentor.

== Work ==
=== Each Moment As It Flies ===
Bruce's 1984 book Each Moment As It Flies: Writings by Harry Bruce is a collection of essays featuring his best works published in various magazines, characterized by Maurice Tougas of the Red Deer Advocate as "an eclectic collection of storytelling, travel yarns, profiles and punditry, often beautifully written and always thoughtful." Printed on the dustjacket of the book is a remark from Barbara Frum reading "Harry Bruce writes like an angel. I wish I could write like him."

=== Movin' East ===
A second collection of essays and tales, Steven Slipp of Quill & Quire wrote in his review that Bruce's "familiar voice is freshwater clear, and his taste for life is as sharp as the salt in his adopted Atlantic surf". Books in Canada contributor Nancy White wrote "as a compendium of Canadian political, sporting, and cultural activities over the last two decades, Movin' East is a rare and pleasant combination of side-wrenching laughter and thoughts too deep for tears".

=== Frank Sobey: The Man And The Empire ===
In 1985, Bruce published his biography of Frank Sobey, titled Frank Sobey: The Man And The Empire. The 443 page biography covers the life and career of Sobey, detailing his 22 years as mayor of Stellarton and his role in building his family's grocery store business into a large national company with diverse holdings. The book was a commissioned work, paid for by Donald Sobey, the youngest of Frank Sobey's three sons. Before publication, Bruce would read the entire finished manuscript aloud to Frank Sobey, remarking in his 2020 book Halifax and Me that the only changes Sobey requested were not related to himself but to the people of Pictou County. William Smith of the Telegraph-Journal described it as an "interesting and important book" and said it contains "penetrating insights into the practical problems of expanding the private sector of the region's economy". Hubert Bauch of the Montreal Gazette wrote that "Frank Sobey's story should be required reading for anyone with dreams of taking a modest venture for a ride into the corporate stratosphere", and described Bruce's prose as "at once lively and smooth". Frank Sobey: The Man And The Empire was the runner-up for the first National Business Book Award.

=== Down Home: Notes of a Maritime Son ===
Bruce's 1988 book Down Home is referred to in the Oxford Guide to Canadian Literature as "his best and perhaps best received work". Bruce wrote Down Home in the historic Bruce homestead in Port Shoreham, Nova Scotia, opening the book with "I am writing this in longhand in the house where my father was born, and where, if he'd had the choice, he'd have died". It was the winner of the first Dartmouth Book Award in 1989.

=== Maud: The Life of L.M. Montgomery ===
Bruce's first book for young adults was a 1992 biography on the early life of Lucy Maud Montgomery. According to a reviewer in Kirkus Reviews, "quotes from her (Montgomery's) works, capture her lively spirit, while social context conveys the magnitude of obstacles she overcame".

=== Page Fright: Fetishes and Foibles of Famous Writers ===
Published in 2009, Page Fright is a collection of accounts of the methods, rituals, habits, superstitions and quirks of various well-known authors. Dave Shiflett in The Wall Street Journal called it "a delightful volume about the practical side of the 'world's loneliest calling'".

== See also ==
- List of writers from Nova Scotia
- List of Canadian journalists
