= Atlantic Business Magazine =

Canadian magazine based in Newfoundland

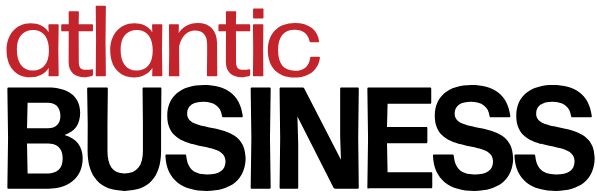

- Cover of the March/April 2026 issue
- Categories: Business
- Frequency: Bi-monthly
- Country: Canada
- Based in: St. John's, Newfoundland and Labrador
- Language: English
- Website: atlanticbusinessmagazine.ca
- ISSN: 1484-6381

Atlantic Business Magazine is a Canadian magazine based in St. John's, Newfoundland which covers business topics in Atlantic Canada.

== Description and history ==
Atlantic Business Magazine is a bi-monthly publication covering business-related topics in Atlantic Canada. The magazine's flagship publication, the Top 50 CEO Awards, is published yearly in May and is intended to recognize successful businesspeople in Atlantic Canada. The inaugural issue highlighted business leaders such as Robert Zildjian, the founder and chairman of Sabian Cymbals.

In 2017, Atlantic Business Magazine published a magazine issue dedicated to Atlantic Canadian businesswomen which received harsh reactions from readers online, with editor Dawn Chafe stating that she had "incredibly negative and actually shocking comments" directed towards her on Twitter following publication of the issue. Chafe stated that although there had been negative comments, she had also received a number of positive comments regarding the issue. In 2024, Atlantic Business Magazine published a list of 25 Most Powerful Women in Business.

In 2021, Atlantic Business Magazine participated in an initiative with universities across Nova Scotia which aimed to draw more black and Indigenous students to pursue a business education.

== Recognition ==
At the 2009 Tabbie international press awards, Atlantic Business Magazine's art director Jason Miller received a gold award for Best Design in the Table of Contents category. Atlantic Business Magazine correspondent Alec Bruce received an honourable mention for Best Feature Story for his article "Strangers in a Strange Land".

== See also ==
- Atlantic Insight
- Media in Canada
- List of Canadian magazines
