= Lieutenant governor (Canada) =

Viceroy of a Canadian province

Lieutenant governors by province and commissioners by territory

In Canada, a lieutenant governor (/lɛfˈtɛnənt/; French [masculine]: lieutenant-gouverneur, or [feminine]: lieutenante-gouverneure) is the sub-national representative of the King of Canada in the government of each province. The governor general of Canada appoints the lieutenant governors on the advice of the prime minister of Canada to carry out most of the monarch's constitutional and ceremonial duties for an unfixed period of time—known as serving "at Her Excellency's pleasure" — though service for five years is the normal convention. Similar positions in Canada's three territories are termed "commissioners" and are representatives of the federal government, not the monarch directly.

The offices have their roots in the 16th and 17th century colonial governors of New France and British North America, though the present incarnations of the positions emerged with Canadian Confederation and the British North America Act in 1867, which defined the viceregal offices as the "Lieutenant Governor of the Province acting by and with the Advice the Executive Council thereof." The posts still ultimately represented the government of Canada (that is, the Governor-General-in-Council) until the ruling in 1882 of the Lord Watson of the Judicial Committee of the Privy Council in the case of Maritime Bank v. Receiver-General of New Brunswick, whereafter the lieutenant governors were recognized as the direct representatives of the monarch. The Constitution Act, 1982 provides that any constitutional amendment that affects the office of the lieutenant governor requires the unanimous consent of each provincial Legislative Assembly as well as the House of Commons and the Senate.

== History ==
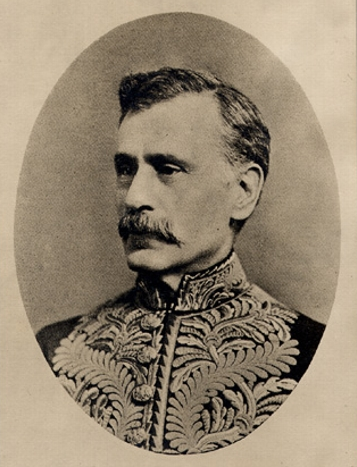
The first lieutenant governor of Saskatchewan (1905–1910), Amédée E. Forget

The position of lieutenant governor has existed in Canada since before Confederation in 1867. In 1638, Sir David Kirke was the first English administrator in North America, appointed Governor of Newfoundland by royal charter of King Charles I. He served in this position overseeing trade and taxation in the colony until 1651. In 1786, the post of Governor-in-Chief of British North America was created as a central viceregal office overseeing the British colonies of Prince Edward Island, Nova Scotia, New Brunswick, and the Province of Quebec, whose governors then became lieutenant governors, though that of Quebec was occupied simultaneously by the governor-in-chief. This structure remained in place until the partitioning in 1791 of the Province of Quebec into Upper Canada and Lower Canada, which then each had an office of lieutenant governor. The Governor in chief continued to be the lieutenant governor of Lower Canada.

In 1867, when Canada was created as a federal state, it had four provinces, each with their own lieutenant governor. Under the British North America Act, 1867, the Lieutenant Governor of Nova Scotia and Lieutenant Governor of New Brunswick continued essentially as before. New positions of Lieutenant Governor of Ontario and Lieutenant Governor of Quebec were created for the new provinces of Ontario and Quebec. Thereafter, when other colonies joined Canada, their governors became lieutenant governors, (Note: The Governor of the United Colonies of Vancouver Island and British Columbia became in 1871, through an Order in Council by Queen Victoria, the Lieutenant Governor of British Columbia; the Governors of Prince Edward Island became in 1873, by Order in Council of the Queen, the Lieutenant Governor of Prince Edward Island; and the Commission Governor of Newfoundland became in 1949, through the Newfoundland Act, the Lieutenant Governor of Newfoundland.) while the creation of new provinces out of Rupert's Land and the Northwest Territories—which each had their own lieutenant governors—led to the establishment of new viceregal posts. (Note: The office of the Lieutenant Governor of Manitoba was created in 1870 by the Manitoba Act, the office of the Lieutenant Governor of Alberta was created in 1905 by the Alberta Act, and the office of the Lieutenant Governor of Saskatchewan was created in 1905 by the Saskatchewan Act.)

Beginning immediately after confederation, the Dominion government and the Colonial Office in London considered the lieutenant governors as representatives of, and subordinate to, the governor general in Ottawa, reflecting the view of Sir John A. Macdonald and the Earl of Derby, who set up the Constitution Act, 1867, so as to have the lieutenant governors appointed by the governor general, and who expected that Royal Assent would be given in the name of the governor general, rather than the King. This was a deliberate constitutional choice in reaction to the American Civil War, which had proven a potent "disastrous outcome of the doctrine of states' rights" that characterized American federalism. A ruling by the Judicial Committee of the Privy Council in 1882 altered this view, establishing that the lieutenant governors represented the Queen in the provinces as much as the governor general did in the federal jurisdiction. Nevertheless, unlike in the Australian federation formed in 1901, lieutenant governors remain selected on the advice of the federal prime minister rather than the provincial premiers, and federal governments remain theoretically capable of disallowing provincial legislation, whether from the reservation by a lieutenant governor or not.

== Selection and appointments ==
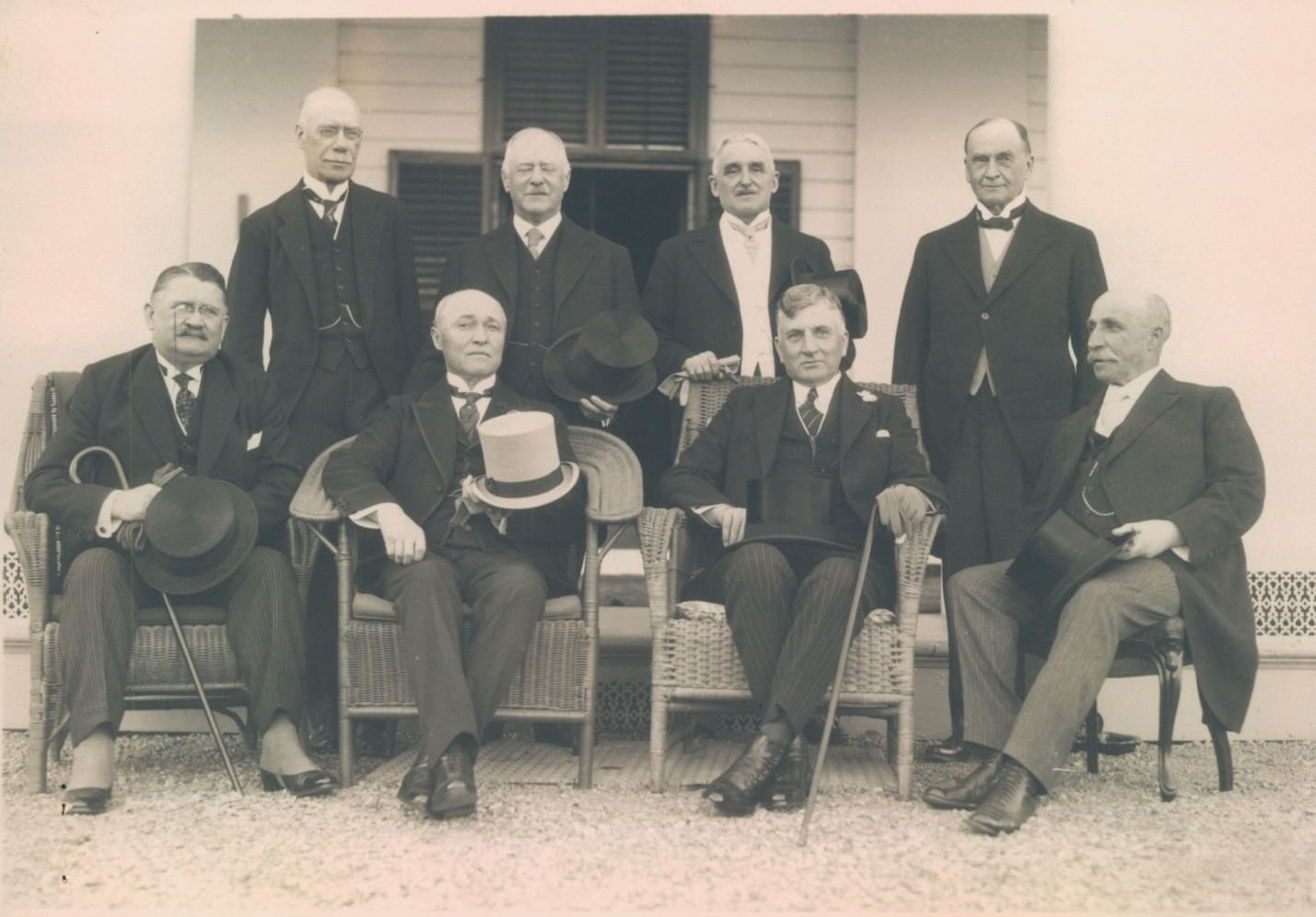
A meeting of Canada's lieutenant governors in September 1925; standing, from left to right: Henry William Newlands (Saskatchewan), Walter Cameron Nichol (British Columbia), Frank Richard Heartz (Prince Edward Island), James Albert Manning Aikins (Manitoba); seated, left to right: James Robson Douglas (Nova Scotia), Narcisse Pérodeau (Quebec), Henry Cockshutt (Ontario), and William Frederick Todd (New Brunswick); (missing: Robert Brett (Alberta)

Unlike the federal viceroy, the Canadian lieutenant-governors have been since 1867, if not Canadian-born, at least long-time residents of Canada and not of the peerage, though a number, up until the Nickle Resolution in 1919, were knighted. While required by the tenets of constitutional monarchy to be nonpartisan during their time in office, lieutenant-governors have frequently been former politicians and some have returned to politics following their viceregal service. Canadian lieutenant governorships have also been used to promote women and minorities into a prominent position: The first female viceroy in Canada was Pauline Mills McGibbon, Lieutenant Governor of Ontario from 1974 to 1980, and many women have since served in both that province and others. There have been two Black (Lincoln Alexander and Mayann E. Francis) and several Indigenous lieutenant governors. Norman Kwong, Lieutenant Governor of Alberta from 2005 to 2010, was Chinese-Canadian and David Lam, the Lieutenant Governor of British Columbia from 1988 to 1995, was Hong Kong-Canadian. Former Lieutenant-Governor of Quebec Lise Thibault used a wheelchair, while David Onley, the former Lieutenant-Governor of Ontario, had polio as a child and used crutches or a scooter.

The lieutenant-governors are appointed by the Governor General of Canada on the advice of the prime minister. There is no constitutional requirement or consistent practice for the Prime Minister to consult with the province's premier on the appointment of the lieutenant governor.

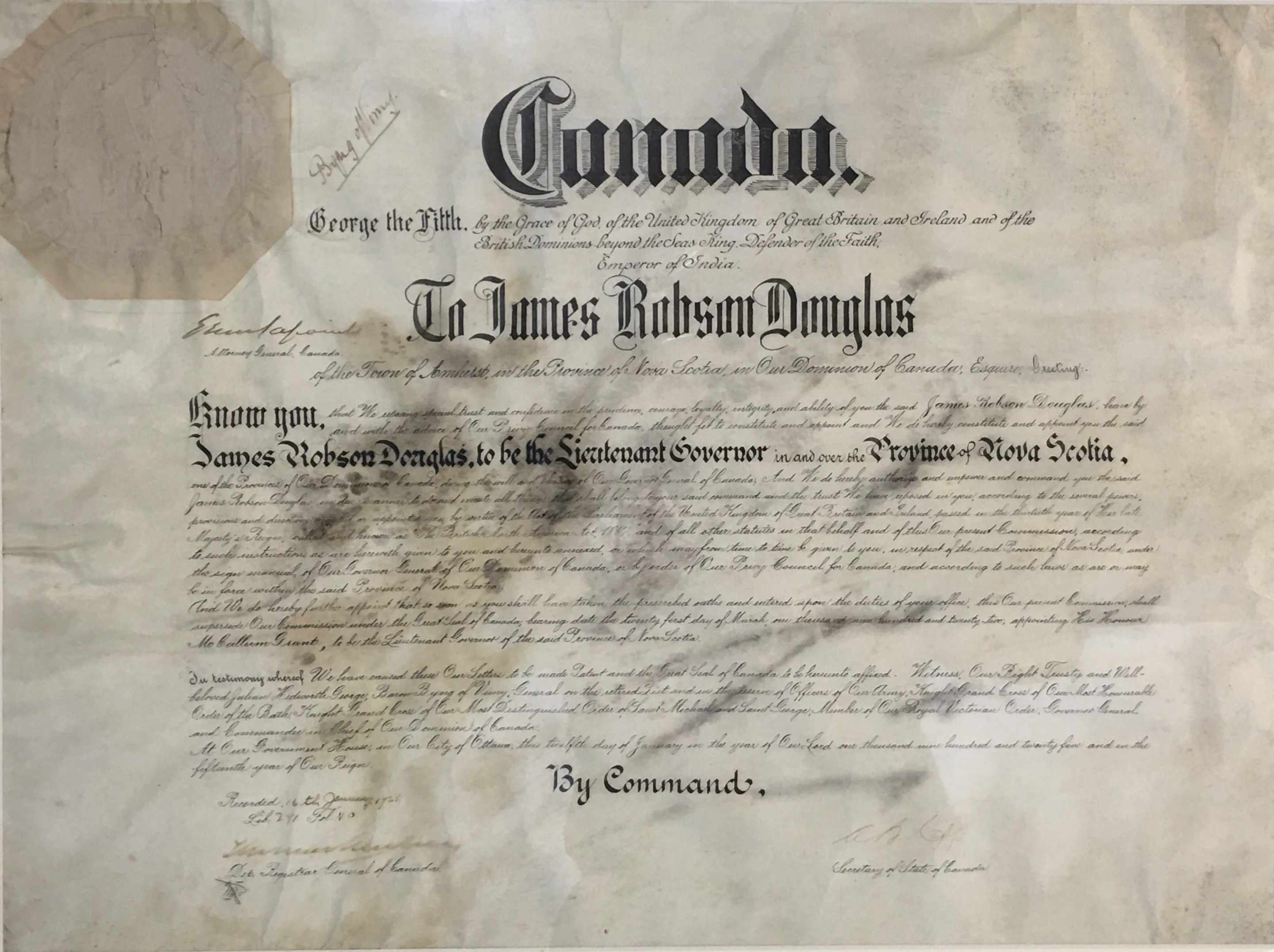
Lieutenant Governor's Commission of Appointment, 1925. Appointing James Robson Douglas as lieutenant governor of Nova Scotia.

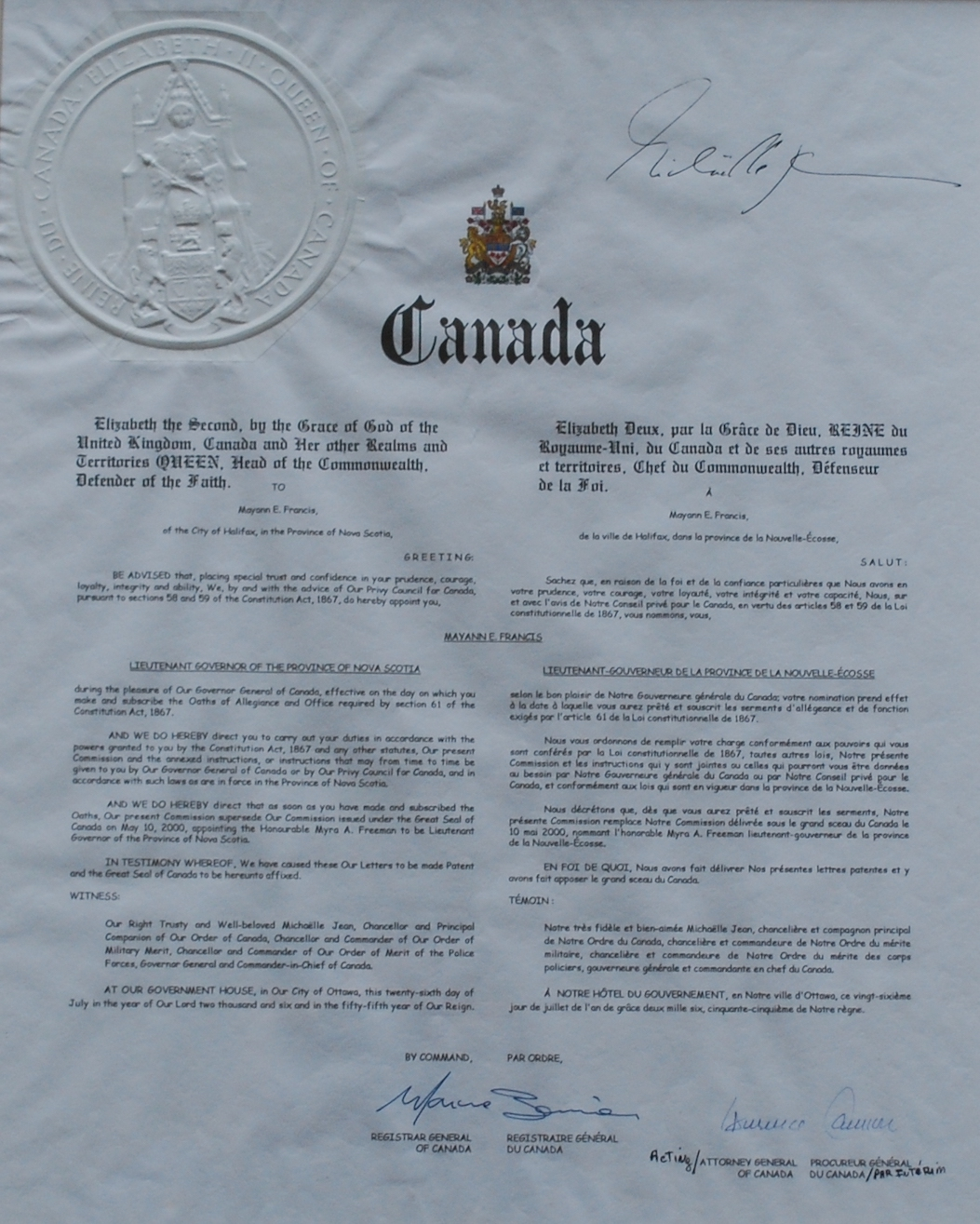
Lieutenant Governor's Commission of Appointment, 2006. Appointing Mayann E. Francis as lieutenant governor of Nova Scotia.

Besides the administration of the oaths of office, there is no set formula for the swearing-in of a lieutenant-governor-designate. Though there may therefore be variations to the following, the appointee will generally travel to the legislative assembly building in the provincial capital, where a guard of honour awaits to give a general salute. From there, the party is led by the speaker of the legislative assembly to the legislative chamber, wherein all justices of the province's superior court, members of the legislative assembly, and other guests are assembled. The governor general's commission for the lieutenant-governor-designate is then read aloud, and the required oaths are administered to the appointee by either the governor general or a delegate thereof; the three oaths are: the Oath of Allegiance, the Oath of Office as lieutenant-governor, and the oath as keeper of the province's great seal. With the affixing of their signature to these three solemn promises, the individual is officially the lieutenant governor, and at that moment the Viceregal Salute is played and a 15-gun salute is conducted outside. The lieutenant governor then receives the insignia of the province's order or orders. Since the appointment in 1956 of John J. Bowlen as Lieutenant Governor of Alberta, newly installed lieutenant governors will, at some point in the first year of their mandate, be invited to a personal audience with the monarch.

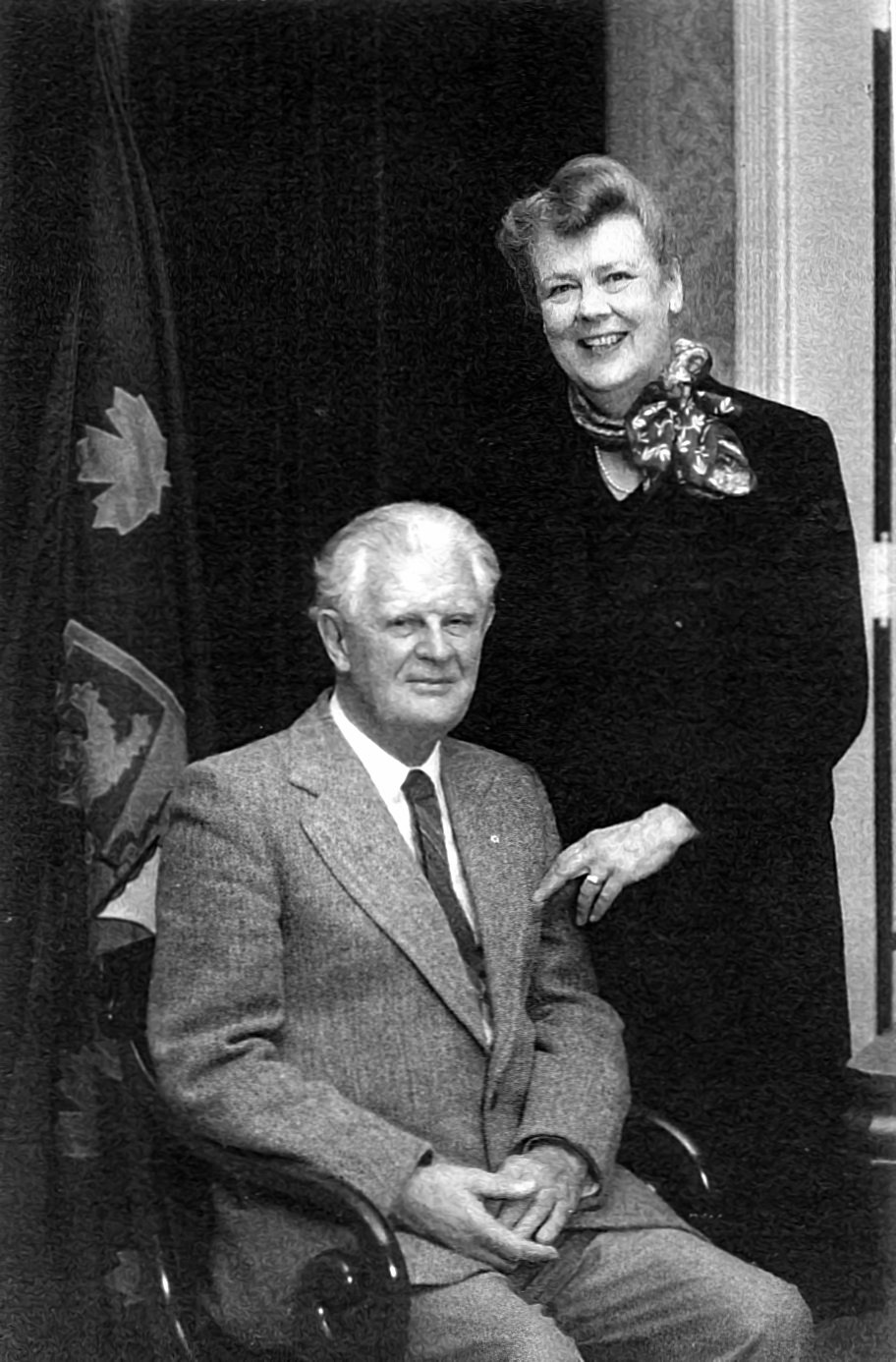
George Stanley (left), designer of the Canadian national flag and lieutenant governor of New Brunswick from 1981 to 1987, with his wife, Ruth

Though incumbents are constitutionally mandated to serve for at least five years, unless the federal parliament agrees to remove the individual from office, the lieutenant-governors still technically act at the governor general's pleasure, meaning the prime minister may recommend to the governor general that a lieutenant governor remain in the Crown's service for a longer period of time, sometimes upwards of more than ten years. (Note: Robert Brett acted as Lieutenant Governor of Alberta between 1915 and 1925 and Lise Thibault served as Lieutenant Governor of Quebec from 1997 to 2007.) A lieutenant governor may also resign (Note: Lieutenant Governor of Quebec Jean-Louis Roux resigned the viceregal post in 1997 due to controversy.) and some have died in office. (Note: For example, Lieutenant Governor of Alberta Lois Hole died of cancer on 6 January 2005, and Lieutenant Governors of Nova Scotia Frank Stanfield and David MacKeen died on 25 September 1931 and 13 November 1916, respectively. Further, Lieutenant Governor of Quebec Paul Comtois died in the fire that destroyed the province's viceregal residence on 21 February 1966.)

The governor general also has the power to appoint a person as "administrator of the Government", under a dormant commission to act in the place of a lieutenant-governor who is unable to act, for example due to illness or absence from the province. Since 1953, the practice has been that the chief justice of the province has a standing appointment to act as administrator. If the position of lieutenant governor is vacant, for example due to the death of the lieutenant governor, the administrator is not able to act until a new lieutenant governor is appointed.

This situation arose in Saskatchewan in 1978, when the Lieutenant Governor, George Porteous, died suddenly on February 6, 1978. The administrator, Chief Justice Culliton, declined to exercise any powers of the Lieutenant-Governor, on the basis that he had no power to act when the office was vacant. The federal Department of Justice and the Prime Minister's Office took the same position. As a result, the Saskatchewan Government could not recall the prorogued Legislative Assembly, nor pass any orders-in-council to proclaim statutes in force, pass regulations, or exercise any other statutory powers requiring an order-in-council. This situation lasted until the federal government appointed Porteous's successor, Irwin McIntosh, on February 22, 1978.

== Role ==
As the Canadian monarch is shared equally amongst the ten provinces of Canada, as well as the federal realm, and the sovereign lives outside Canada's borders, a lieutenant governors' primary task is to perform the sovereign's constitutional duties on their behalf, acting within the principles of parliamentary democracy and responsible government as a guarantor of continuous and stable governance, and as a nonpartisan safeguard against the abuse of power. The office is the core of authority in a province.

For the most part, the powers of the Crown are exercised on a day-to-day basis by elected and appointed individuals, leaving the lieutenant-governors to perform the various ceremonial duties the sovereign otherwise carries out when in the country; at such a moment, a lieutenant-governor will decrease their public appearances, though the presence of the monarch does not undermine any lieutenant-governor's ability to perform governmental roles.

=== Constitutional ===
Though the monarch retains all executive, legislative, and judicial power in and over Canada, the lieutenant governors are permitted to exercise most of this, including the Royal Prerogative, in the sovereign's name, as laid out in various acts in the constitution, though most revolve around the original clauses in section V of the Constitution Act, 1867. While they continue to be appointed by the governor general, the lieutenant governors are considered to be direct representatives of the sovereign. In a province, it is thus the lieutenant governor who is required to appoint persons to the executive council (or cabinet) and convention dictates that the lieutenant governor must further draw from them an individual to act as premier—in almost all cases the member of the legislative assembly who commands the confidence of the legislature. This group of ministers of the Crown is theoretically tasked with tendering to the viceroy guidance on the exercise of the Royal Prerogative, an arrangement called the King-in-Council or, more specifically, the Governor-in-Council, in which capacity the lieutenant governor will issue royal proclamations and sign orders in council. The Governor-in-Council of both Nova Scotia and New Brunswick are also specifically tasked to appoint in the King's name the judges of the courts of probate. The advice given by the cabinet is, in order to ensure the stability of government, typically binding; the viceroy may, in exceptional circumstances, invoke the reserve powers, which remain the Crown's final check against a ministry's abuse of power. (Note: See Note 1 at King's Privy Council for Canada.)

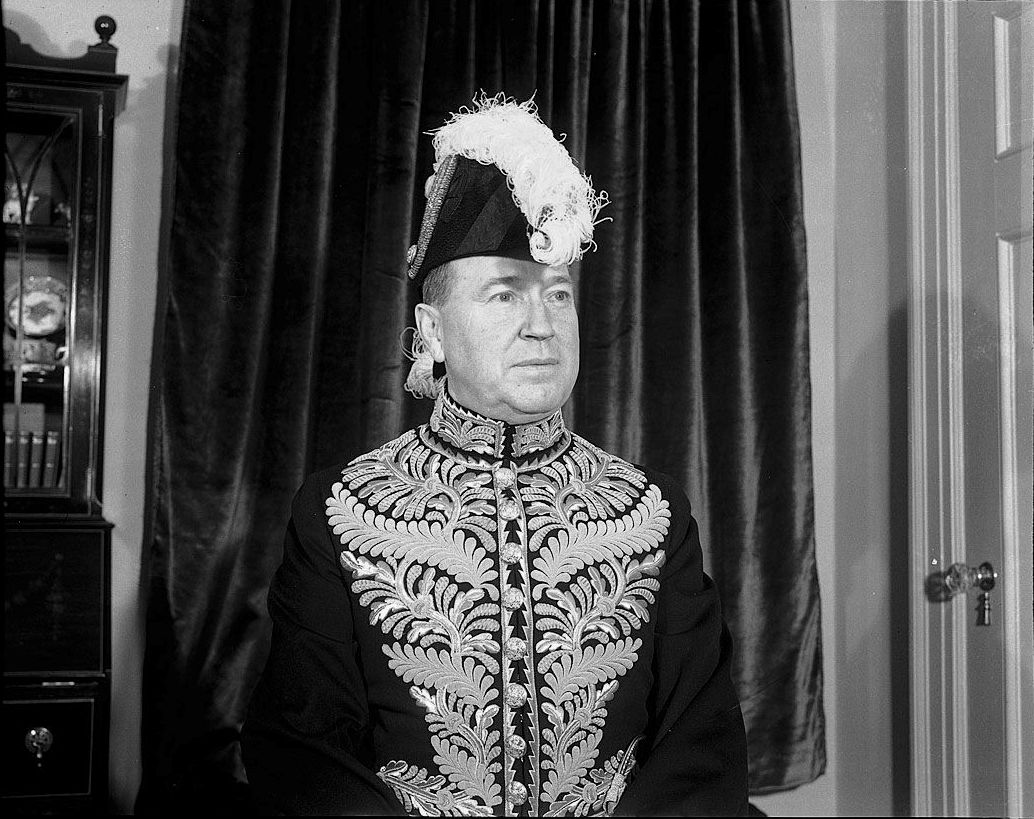
Albert Edward Matthews, lieutenant governor of Ontario, whom Mitchell Hepburn avoided completely throughout the latter's service as premier

The lieutenant-governor alone is also constitutionally mandated to summon the legislature. Beyond that, the viceroy carries out the other conventional parliamentary duties in the sovereign's stead, including reading the Speech From the Throne and proroguing and dissolving parliament. The lieutenant-governor also grants royal assent in the King's name; legally, granting royal assent (making the bill law), withholding royal assent (vetoing the bill), or reserving the bill for the signification of the governor general's pleasure. If the governor general withholds royal assent, the sovereign may within two years disallow the bill, thereby annulling the law in question.

R. MacGregor Dawson opined that, following Confederation, the lieutenant-governors diverged from the governor general in that they continued to demonstrate a power independent of the Cabinet and parliament; lieutenant-governors had variously dismissed governments, refused the advice of ministers, and insisted on the creation of royal commissions. Altogether, lieutenant-governors had also withheld Royal Assent to bills 28 times and reserved bills for the consideration of the governor general 71 times. The last example of the former was in 1945 and the latter in 1961. (Note: Lieutenant Governor of Alberta John C. Bowen in 1937 refused to grant Royal Assent to three bills passed by William Aberhart's Social Credit government on the grounds that they were unconstitutional, and Lieutenant Governor of Saskatchewan Frank Lindsay Bastedo in 1961 reserved Royal Assent to the Mineral Contracts Alteration Act, passing it on, instead, to the Governor General for consideration.) Relations between lieutenant governor and Cabinet have also at times been strained by ministers' unwillingness to openly acknowledge the authority of a federal appointee, often recommended by a federal prime minister who adhered to different political beliefs.

=== Ceremonial ===
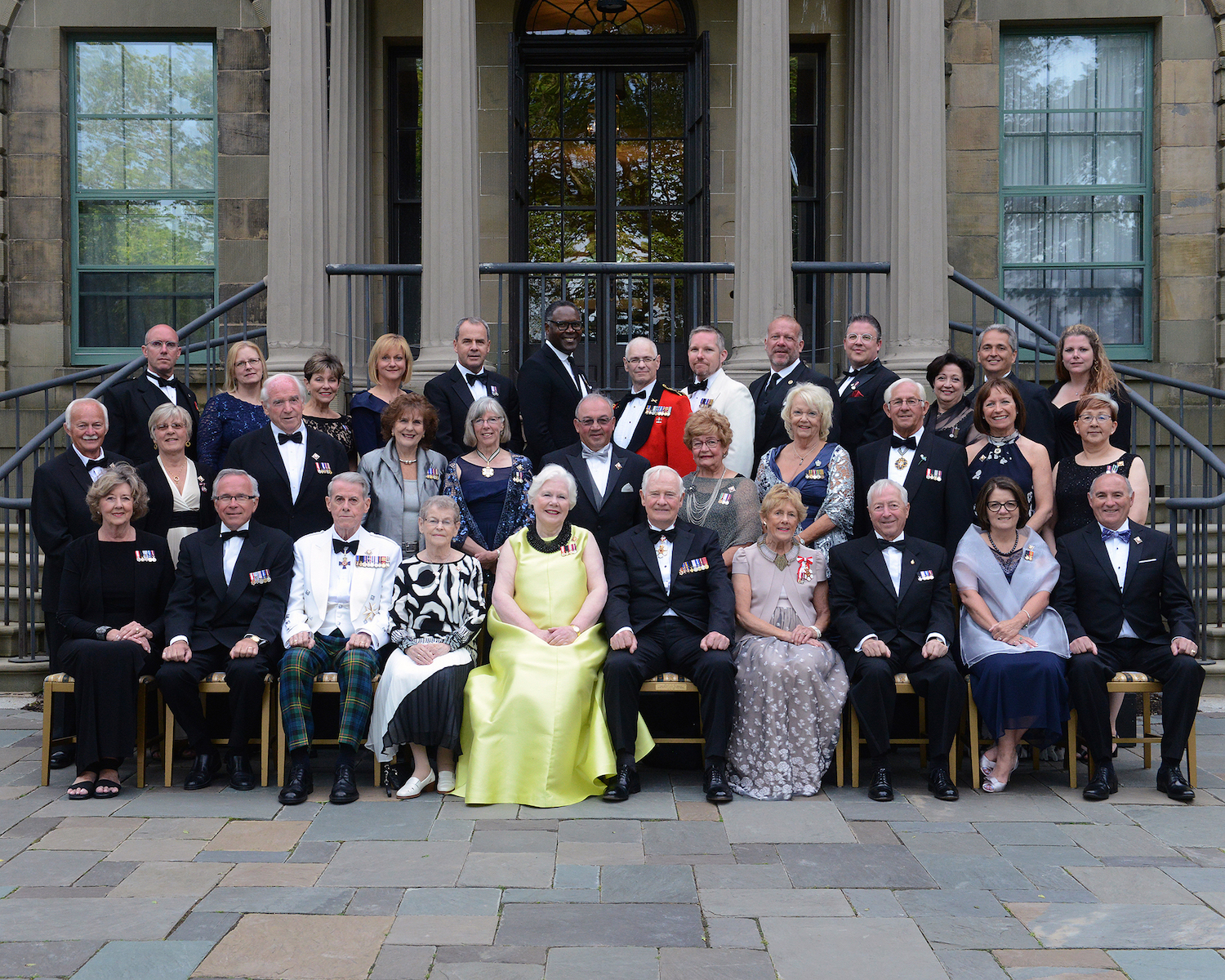
Canada's governor general, lieutenant governors, territorial commissioners and their private secretaries, 2016

With most constitutional functions lent to cabinet, a lieutenant governor acts in a primarily ceremonial fashion, carrying out some of the ritual duties normally associated with heads of state and thus symbolizing the sovereignty of the provinces within confederation. The provincial viceroys have been said to be, outside of Quebec, "a focus of community ideals and a reinforcement of provincial identity."

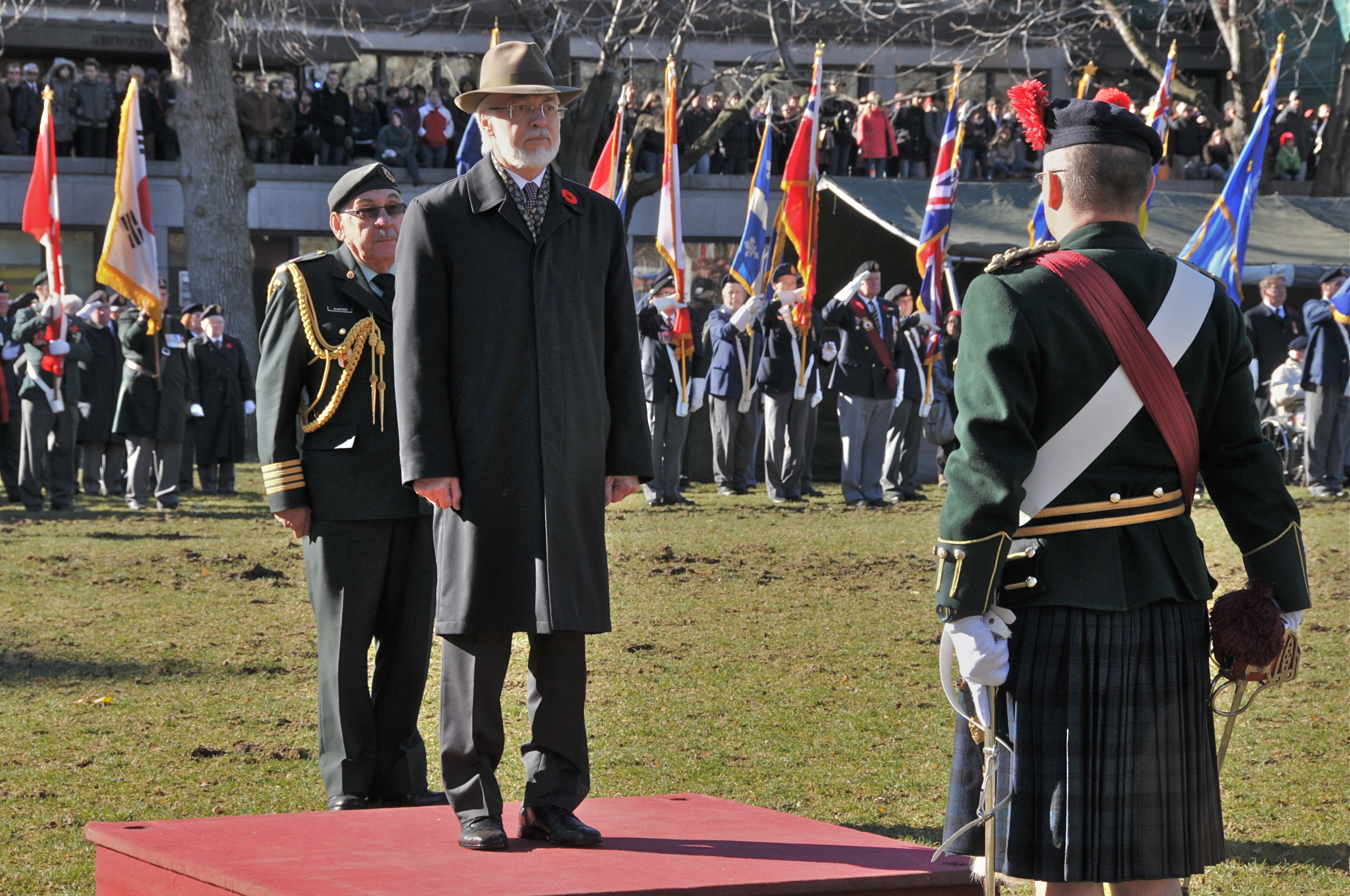
Lieutenant Governor of Quebec Pierre Duchesne receives the viceregal salute at Remembrance Day ceremonies in 2010.

The lieutenant governor hosts members of the Canadian Royal Family, as well as foreign royalty and heads of state, and is also tasked with fostering national unity and pride. One way in which this is carried out is travelling the province and meeting with residents from all regions and ethnic groups, some of whom a lieutenant governor will induct into the province's orders and present to others medals and decorations. This travel takes place mostly within a lieutenant governor's province, the viceroys rarely performing state duties anywhere else in Canada, and never internationally, unless it is on behalf of the monarch in a federal capacity; (Note: For example, Lieutenant Governor of Ontario David Onley represented the Queen and Canada at the 2008 Summer Paralympics opening ceremony in Beijing, China.) it has been argued that the provincial representatives of the King should start to undertake trips to represent their province abroad. In the exercise of these duties, the lieutenant governors may sometimes receive advice from the Department of Canadian Heritage Ceremonial and Canadian Symbols Promotion Program. During a provincial election, a lieutenant governor will curtail these public duties, so as not to appear as though they are involving themselves in political affairs.

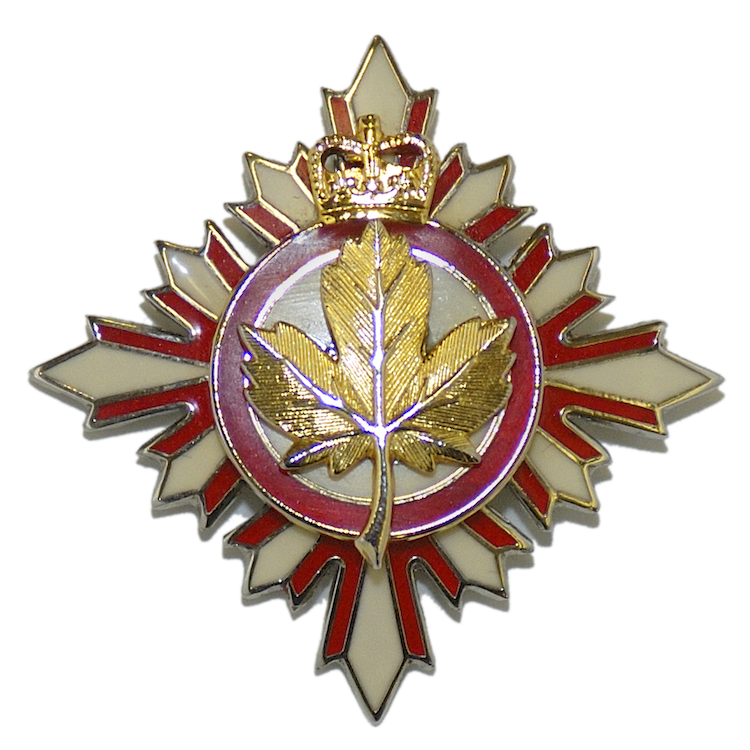
Lieutenant Governor's Recognition Badge

The viceroys themselves also offer awards, such as the Lieutenant Governor's Award for Outstanding Service to Rural Saskatchewan, the Lieutenant Governor's Nova Scotia Talent Trust Award, and the Lieutenant Governor's Award for Excellence in Architecture, awarded in New Brunswick, and the Heritage Canada Foundation also presents the Lieutenant Governor's Award, presented to an individual or group who has achieved an outstanding result in heritage conservation in the province in which the Heritage Canada Foundation's annual conference is held. Further, the lieutenant governors (as well as the territorial commissioners) present the Vice-Regal and Commissioners' Commendation to individuals who offer their service—paid or volunteer—to the viceregal offices. It was originally intended to be a distinction in place of appointment to the Royal Victorian Order, regularly granted to those who aided the monarch or governor general with distinction, but nominees from the lieutenant governors were frequently overlooked by staff at Rideau Hall. After 1984, suggestions from the lieutenant governors' offices for membership in the Royal Victorian Order were more readily accepted and the Vice-Regal and Commissioners' Commendation became an award for one or more commendable acts benefiting the viceroy.

== Symbols and protocol ==
As the personal representative of the monarch, a lieutenant-governor follows only the sovereign in the province's order of precedence, preceding even other members of the Royal Family. Though the federal viceroy is considered primus inter pares amongst their provincial counterparts, the governor general also takes a lower rank to the lieutenant-governors in the provincial spheres; at federal functions, the governor general, as the King's viceregal representative in the country, precedes the lieutenant-governors. An incumbent lieutenant governor is also entitled to the use of the style His or Her Honour, and is granted the additional honorific of The Honourable for their time in office and for life afterwards.

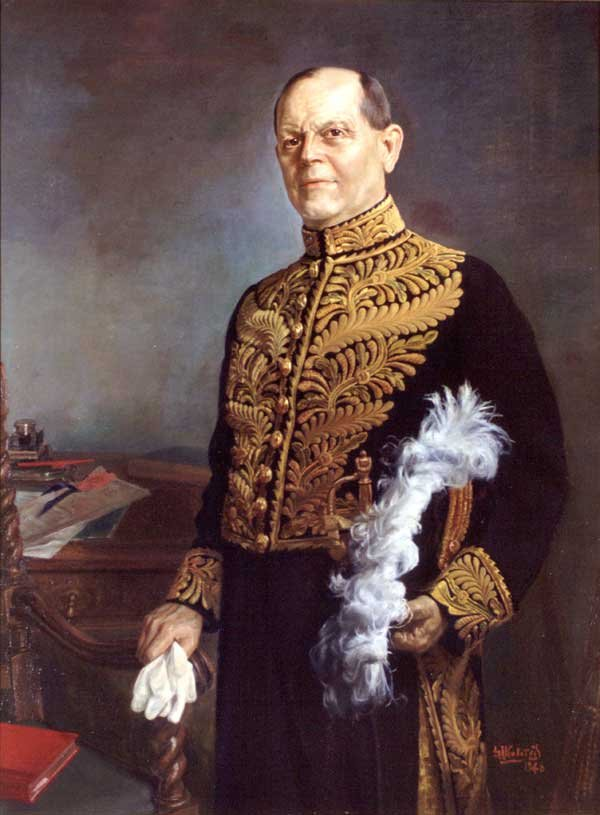
Ray Lawson, lieutenant governor of Ontario from 1946 to 1952, wearing second-class court uniform

Traditionally, lieutenant governors were entitled to wear first-class court uniform. Today, the practice continues in some provinces, such as Nova Scotia, Alberta, and British Columbia. Since 1999, lieutenant-governors have been entitled to wear a special badge of office.

Per the orders' constitutions, the lieutenant-governors, except for that of Quebec, serve as the chancellor of their province's order. They also upon installation automatically become a Knight or Dame of Justice and a Vice-Prior in Canada of the Most Venerable Order of the Hospital of Saint John of Jerusalem. All of these honours are retained following an incumbent's departure from office, with the individual remaining in the highest category of the order, and they may also be further distinguished with induction into other orders or the receipt of other awards.

The Viceregal Salute — composed of the first six bars of the Royal Anthem ("God Save the King") followed by the first and last four bars of the national anthem ("O Canada") — is the salute used to greet a lieutenant-governor upon arrival at, and mark their departure from most official events. To mark a viceroy's presence at any building, ship, airplane, or car in Canada, the relevant lieutenant-governor's flag is employed. Most provincial viceregal flags consist of a blue field bearing the shield of the province's coat of arms surrounded by ten gold maple leaves—each symbolizing one province—surmounted by a crown. In a provincial jurisdiction, the lieutenant governor's flag takes precedence over all other flags, save the King's standard, and is also, along with all flags on Canadian Forces property, flown at half-mast upon the death of an incumbent or former lieutenant governor.

== Incumbents ==
=== Lieutenant governors ===
Province	Name	Assumed office	Appointed by	Appointed on the advice of
New Brunswick	Louise Imbeault	January 22, 2025	Mary Simon	Justin Trudeau
Ontario	Edith Dumont	November 14, 2023	Mary Simon	Justin Trudeau
Quebec	Manon Jeannotte	January 25, 2024	Mary Simon	Justin Trudeau
Nova Scotia	Mike Savage	December 13, 2024	Mary Simon	Justin Trudeau
Manitoba	Anita Neville	October 24, 2022	Mary Simon	Justin Trudeau
British Columbia	Wendy Lisogar-Cocchia	January 30, 2025	Mary Simon	Justin Trudeau
Prince Edward Island	Wassim Salamoun	October 17, 2024	Mary Simon	Justin Trudeau
Saskatchewan	Bernadette McIntyre	January 31, 2025	Mary Simon	Justin Trudeau
Alberta	Salma Lakhani	August 26, 2020	Mary Simon	Justin Trudeau
Newfoundland and Labrador	Joan Marie Aylward	November 14, 2023	Mary Simon	Justin Trudeau

=== Commissioners ===
Territory	Name	Assumed office	Appointed by
Northwest Territories	Gerald Kisoun	May 14, 2024	Governor-General in Council
Yukon	Adeline Webber	May 31, 2023	Governor-General in Council
Nunavut	Eva Aariak	January 14, 2021	Governor-General in Council

== Spelling ==
In the Canadian context, there are numerous, and not mutually agreeable, notions regarding hyphenation and capitalization of the position title. Various acts in the Canadian constitution and numerous provincial websites typically indicate Lieutenant Governor of [Province] (upper case and no hyphen), likely due to the primacy of those positions in their respective jurisdictions. The Canadian Style indicates Lieutenant-Governor (upper case with hyphen), though lieutenant-governors (lower case and hyphenated) when pluralized. The Guide to Canadian English Usage equivocates somewhat, indicating upper case only when used in and associated with a specific provincial lieutenant governor or name (e.g., Lieutenant-Governor Lincoln Alexander), not generally, and varied use. In French, the term is always hyphenated, and varies slightly by gender. Also, as governor is the main noun in the title, it is the word that is pluralized; thus, it is lieutenant governors, rather than lieutenants governor.

== See also ==
- Commissioner § Canadian territories
- Governors of the Australian states
- Lieutenant governor (United States)

== Works cited ==
- McInnis, Edgar (1947). Canada: A Political and Social History. New York and Toronto: Rinehart and Company, Inc. – via Internet Archive.
