= James Robson Douglas =

Canadian politician (1876–1934)

The Honourable James Robson Douglas
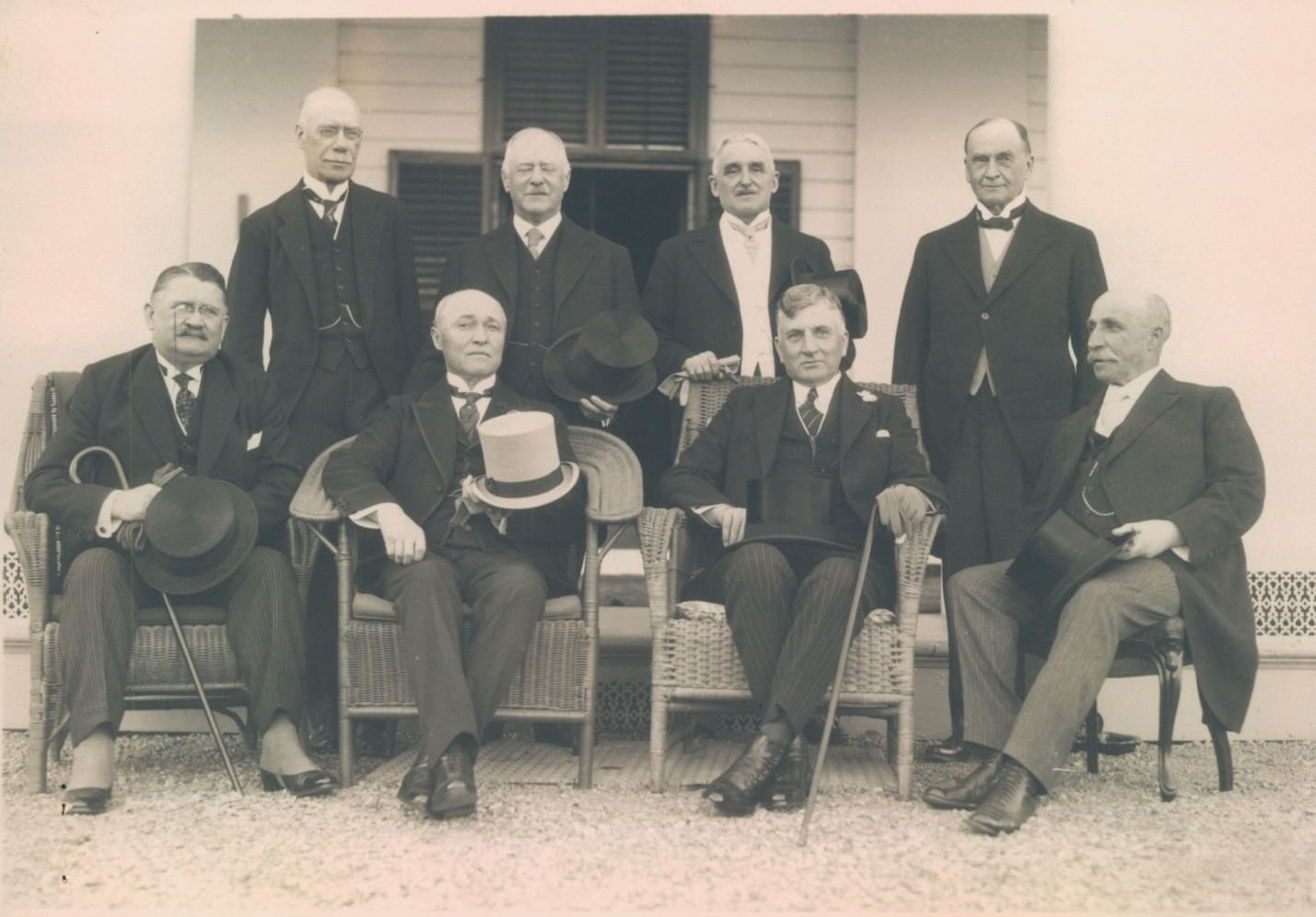

13th Lieutenant Governor of Nova Scotia
- In office January 12, 1925 – September 14, 1925
- Monarch: George V
- Governor General: The Viscount Byng of Vimy
- Premier: Ernest Howard Armstrong; Edgar Nelson Rhodes
- Preceded by: MacCallum Grant
- Succeeded by: James Cranswick Tory

Personal details
- Born: April 13, 1876 Amherst, Nova Scotia
- Died: July 27, 1934 (aged 58) Montreal, Quebec
- Spouse: Marion Genevieve Douglas (née Stevens)
- Occupation: acclaimed broker, property developer and businessman

James Robson Douglas (1876-1934) was named the 13th Lieutenant Governor of Nova Scotia effective January 21, 1925, succeeding MacCallum Grant. He was born in Amherst, Nova Scotia, and was a broker by profession. Douglas resigned as lieutenant-governor on September 24, 1925, nine months into his term, and was replaced by James Tory.

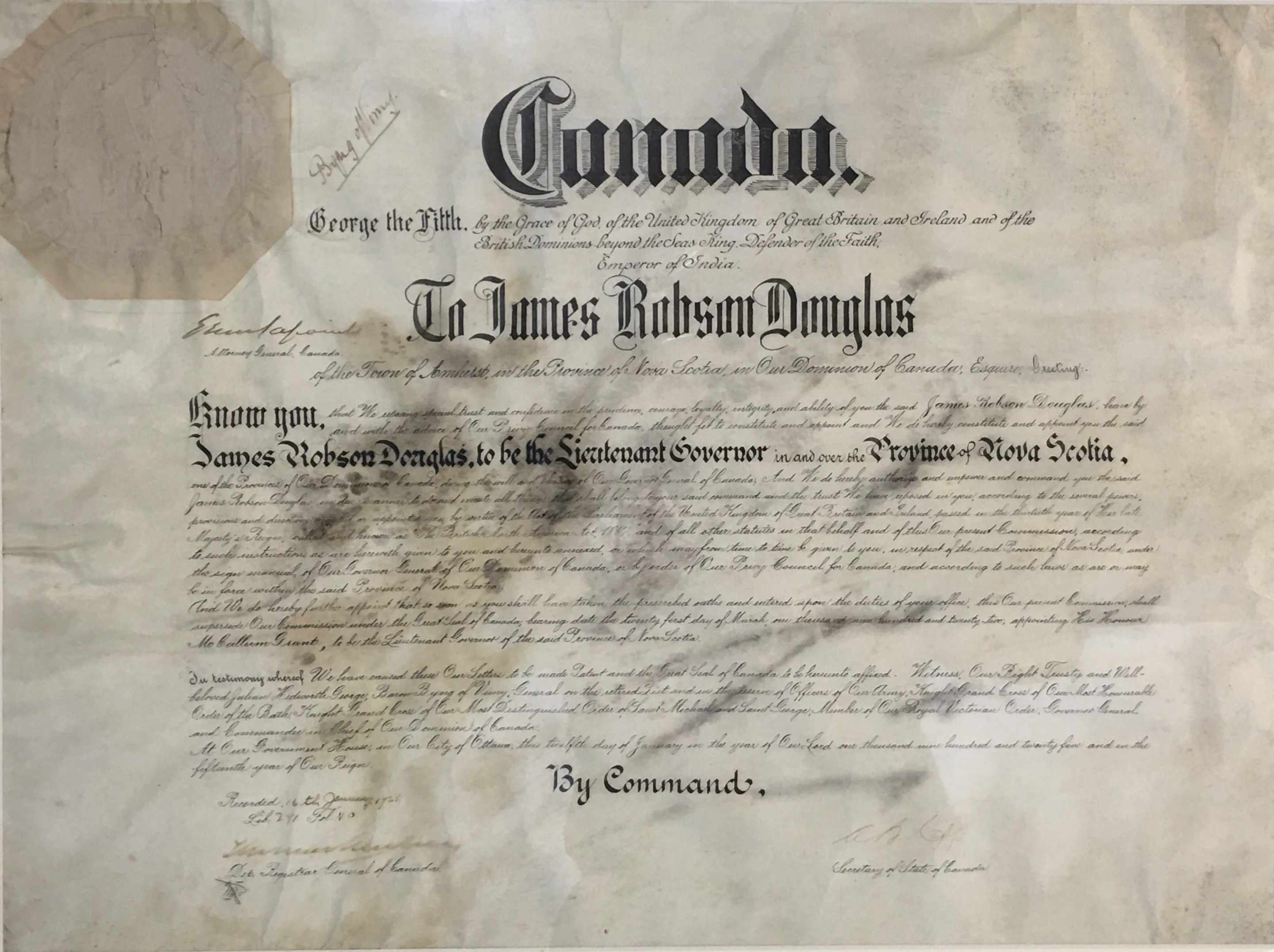
Lieutenant Governor's Commission of Appointment, 1925. Appointing James Robson Douglas as Lieutenant Governor of Nova Scotia.
