= MacPherson Lake =

Lake in Guysborough County, Nova Scotia, Canada

- Location within Nova Scotia
- Location: Guysborough Municipality, Nova Scotia
- Coordinates: 45°26′06″N 61°25′16″W
- Basin countries: Canada

MacPherson Lake is a lake of Guysborough Municipality, Nova Scotia, Canada. It is located a short distance from Port Shoreham Provincial Beach along Highway 344. Yearly fishing derbies are held on the lake and many people with family roots in the area consider it their summer home.

== See also ==
- List of lakes in Nova Scotia
