= Atlantic Journalism Awards =

Canadian journalism event

- Awarded for: Excellence in journalism in Atlantic Canada
- Location: Atlantic Canada (Nova Scotia, New Brunswick, Prince Edward Island, Newfoundland and Labrador)
- Country: Canada
- Presented by: Atlantic Journalism Awards Association
- First award: 1981; 45 years ago
- Website: ajas.ca

The Atlantic Journalism Awards (AJAs) is a Canadian awards show celebrating the work of journalists in Atlantic Canada. The awards were established in 1981 in Halifax, Nova Scotia and are presented across 28 categories. The AJAs created the Atlantic Journalism Hall of Fame in 2018.

== Description ==
The Atlantic Journalism Awards were established in 1981 by the University of King's College School of Journalism in Halifax, Nova Scotia. The awards are conferred by the Atlantic Journalism Awards Corporation, a non-profit charitable organization, and celebrate the work of Atlantic Canadian journalists in print, radio, television, digital news, and current affairs. They are presented across 28 categories, with winners being presented with a framed certificate.

The CBC reporter and producer Glenn Deir was appointed as chair of the Atlantic Journalism Awards board of directors in 2015. As of 2025, the chair is Crystal Murray.

== Atlantic Journalism Hall of Fame ==
The Atlantic Journalism Awards created the Atlantic Journalism Hall of Fame in 2018. Amongst the first five people to be inducted into the hall of fame was Aleta Williams, who was the first African Nova Scotian woman to work at a mainstream news outlet in Nova Scotia.
