= Faith Goldy =

Canadian white nationalist

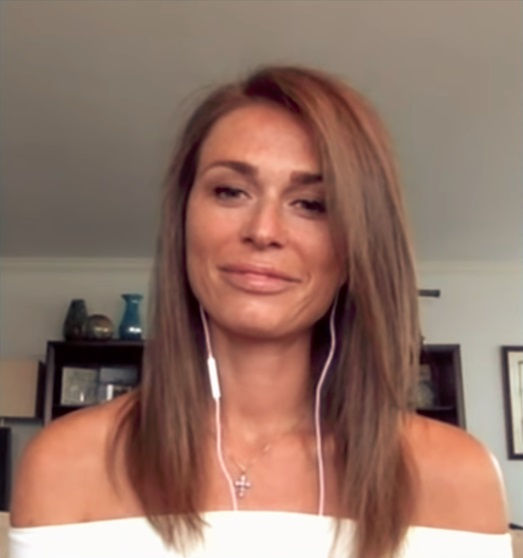
- Goldy in 2018
- Born: Faith Julia Goldy; June 8, 1989 (age 37); Toronto, Ontario, Canada
- Other name: Faith Goldy-Bazos
- Education: Havergal College; Trinity College, Toronto (B.A.)
- Occupation: Political commentator
- Known for: Former reporter for The Rebel Media
- Awards: Gordon Cressy Student Leadership Award
- Website: faithgoldy.ca

Faith Julia Goldy (born June 8, 1989), also known as Faith Goldy-Bazos, is a Canadian far-right, (Note: Sources describing Goldy as far right include: Zimmerman, Jesse (1 December 2017). "The 'Charlottesville' Effect on the Canadian Far-Right". Muftah.org. Archived from the original on 17 February 2018.; Beattie, Samantha (28 August 2018). "Toronto police had 'no idea' they were posing with far-right candidate Faith Goldy, spokesman says". Toronto Star. Archived from the original on 28 August 2018.; Shepherd, Lindsay (22 March 2018). "Lindsay Shepherd: Why I invited Faith Goldy to Laurier". Maclean's.; Chiose, Simona (26 April 2018). "Campaign against campus appearance by far-right activist Faith Goldy raises over $12,000". The Globe and Mail.; Sommer, Will (26 September 2018). "Rudy Giuliani Photographed With White Nationalist Mayoral Candidate". The Daily Beast.; Sources which refer to her as alt-right include: Ngo, Andy (6 August 2018). "Free-Speech Rock Stars". City Journal. Manhattan Institute for Policy Research.; McCullough, J. J. (1 August 2018). "Opinion: To Toronto's embarrassment, a new alt-right challenger rises in Canada". Washington Post.; Silman, Anna (9 November 2018). "We Thought We Knew Faith, Until We Didn't". The Cut. New York Media.) white nationalist political commentator, associated with the alt-right. She was a contributor to The Rebel Media and covered the 2017 Unite the Right rally in Charlottesville, Virginia. Her contract was terminated in 2017 after she participated in a podcast on The Daily Stormer, a neo-Nazi website.

Goldy was a candidate in the 2018 Toronto mayoral election, finishing third with 3.4% of the vote. On April 8, 2019, Goldy was banned from Facebook, along with other "individuals and organizations who spread hate, attack, or call for the exclusion of others on the basis of who they are."

== Early life and education ==
Goldy was born on June 8, 1989 and attended Havergal College, a private K–12 all-girls school in Toronto. She attended Trinity College at the University of Toronto, where she graduated with a double major in politics and history, with minors in philosophy, political science and government. She also began a Master of Public Policy degree at the University of Toronto School of Public Policy and Governance.

In 2012, she received the Gordon Cressy Student Leadership Award from the University of Toronto Alumni Association.

When Goldy was in elementary school, she moved into a duplex with her younger sister and mother. Goldy described her father as abusive in a 2007 radio interview.

Her classmates from Havergal College told The Cut that Goldy was a rebellious teenager with left-wing political opinions. As a student she marched in support of legalizing marijuana, wrote and performed in a docudrama on the rights of sex workers, and presented a science project about different forms of birth control. In her senior year in 2007, Goldy performed in a school theatre production of The Laramie Project.

Goldy also volunteered for a domestic violence support group called the Women Abuse Council.

Goldy was a director on the board of the Metropolitan Andrey Sheptytsky Institute Foundation from October 7, 2015, until her resignation on May 30, 2017.

== Career ==
=== Early career and Sun News Network ===
Goldy's media career began when she appeared as a commentator on a commentary show hosted by Michael Coren on the Crossroads Television System.

She became a staff writer for The Catholic Register in June 2011 after completing a mentorship program hosted by the newspaper in 2008–09. Around the same time she began contributing columns to the National Post and appearing on panels hosted by Corus Entertainment's John Oakley Show.

Goldy's first big public exposure came in September 2012 when she was hired as a reporter with the Sun News Network, which lasted until the network went off the air in February 2015.

Her reporting was made from a social conservative viewpoint that opposed abortion and gun control in Canada. During one segment in 2014, she called on Pope Francis to excommunicate Justin Trudeau, who is a Roman Catholic, for the Liberal Party leader's "extremist" views on abortion. In another segment, Goldy and Coren criticized schools that were opening gender-neutral restrooms for transgender students.

During this time she also began appearing as a news commentator on CFRB 1010 AM, co-hosted a ZoomerMedia show with Conrad Black, and briefly returned to The Catholic Register as a columnist.

=== Rebel News ===
When Sun News Network went off the air, Goldy was hired by Rebel News, a Canadian right-wing website founded by former Sun News Network Colleagues Ezra Levant and Brian Lilley. She hosted a weekly political commentary show called On The Hunt With Faith Goldy.

In 2015, she hosted Paul Joseph Watson on her show and the two falsely claimed Muslim immigrants in Europe had created no-go areas to enforce Sharia law. This has been debunked.

Two days after 27-year-old Alexandre Bissonnette murdered six people at a Quebec City mosque, Goldy promoted the conspiracy theory that the shooter may have been a Muslim man.

In March 2017, Goldy posted on Twitter a video of herself in Bethlehem where she expressed her shock she could hear the Islamic call to prayer in the city, and claimed "Bethlehem's Christian population has been ethnically cleansed." The video was criticized as irresponsible and inflammatory. It was also criticized for not mentioning that Bethlehem's mayor at the time was a Palestinian Catholic woman named Vera Baboun, who has argued policies supporting the expansion of Israeli settlements have pushed Christians out of the Palestinian territories.

That same month, an episode of her show was titled "More Muslims = More Terrorism" in response to the Westminster attack in London. During this episode, she interviewed Tommy Robinson, another Rebel News contributor and the founder of the English Defense League.

On May 31, 2017, Goldy broadcast on Rebel Media "White Genocide in Canada?", in she claimed Canadians with European ancestry were being replaced with non-Europeans because of Canada's immigration policies. In response to the broadcast, several corporate entities stopped advertising with Rebel Media.

On June 21, 2017, Goldy spoke at a live event in Toronto hosted by Rebel News and called for a "counter-crusade" against Muslims. During her speech, she claimed “this is a holy war for Islam. They’re not just coming for our health care, right? They’re coming to break the cross.” Rebel News posted footage of her speech with the title "It's Crusade O'Clock!" During her time in Rebel News, she was considered a part of the counter-jihad movement.

==== Firing from Rebel News ====
In August 2017, Goldy broadcast a livestream of the Unite the Right rally in Charlottesville, Virginia that protested the removal of Confederate monuments. Goldy mocked counter-protesters and complained of alleged police bias against the alt-right demonstrators. Goldy's video also recorded the car attack which killed counter-protester Heather Heyer.

Rebel Media co-founder Brian Lilley resigned after Goldy's broadcasts were published by the website. As Lilley announced his resignation, Goldy called a manifesto by white supremacist Richard Spencer as "robust" and "well thought-out".

Goldy was fired by co-founder Ezra Levant after she appeared on The Krypto Report, a podcast on the neo-Nazi website The Daily Stormer. Levant said he told Goldy not to cover the Charlottesville rally and said her appearance on The Daily Stormer was "just too far". Goldy later said the Stormer interview was "a poor decision."

=== Career as a white supremacist activist ===
After her firing, Goldy continued as an activist for far-right political beliefs. She also began providing commentary exclusively to alt-right and white supremacist media outlets.

In December 2017, Goldy appeared on the alt-right podcast Millennial Woes and recited white supremacist David Lane's slogan, the Fourteen Words: "We must secure the existence of our people and a future for white children". She stated: "I don't see that as controversial... We want to survive" when questioned about her use of the saying.

After reciting the slogan, crowdfunding site Patreon suspended her account in May 2018 and she was banned from PayPal in July. After losing her Patreon account, she began receiving contributions through an alternative crowdfunding system, Freestartr. This platform was shut out of PayPal the same month, leaving her unable to receive payments.

In a YouTube video posted in April 2018, Goldy praised the writing of Corneliu Zelea Codreanu, a Romanian politician who founded an ultranationalist and violently antisemitic organization called the Iron Guard, when discussing book recommendations for her followers.

On September 8, 2018, Goldy endorsed The Turner Diaries on her Twitter account. The book was written by American neo-Nazi and National Alliance founder William Luther Pierce. It tells a fictional story of a race war that spreads across the world and ends with the genocide of all non-white races. The book is credited with inspiring the Oklahoma City Bombing and multiple hate crimes, and is banned in Canada.

On March 2, 2020, a video narrated and written by Goldy for VDARE called for the creation of a "white ethnostate" in the United States. She has appeared on Lana Lokteff's program Radio 3Fourteen. She also gave her support to the Greek political party Golden Dawn, which has been described as neo-fascist and a neo-Nazi group.

Goldy has been out of public life since 2021, stating that "I am a wife, wholly devoted to my private life."

== 2018 Toronto mayoral campaign ==
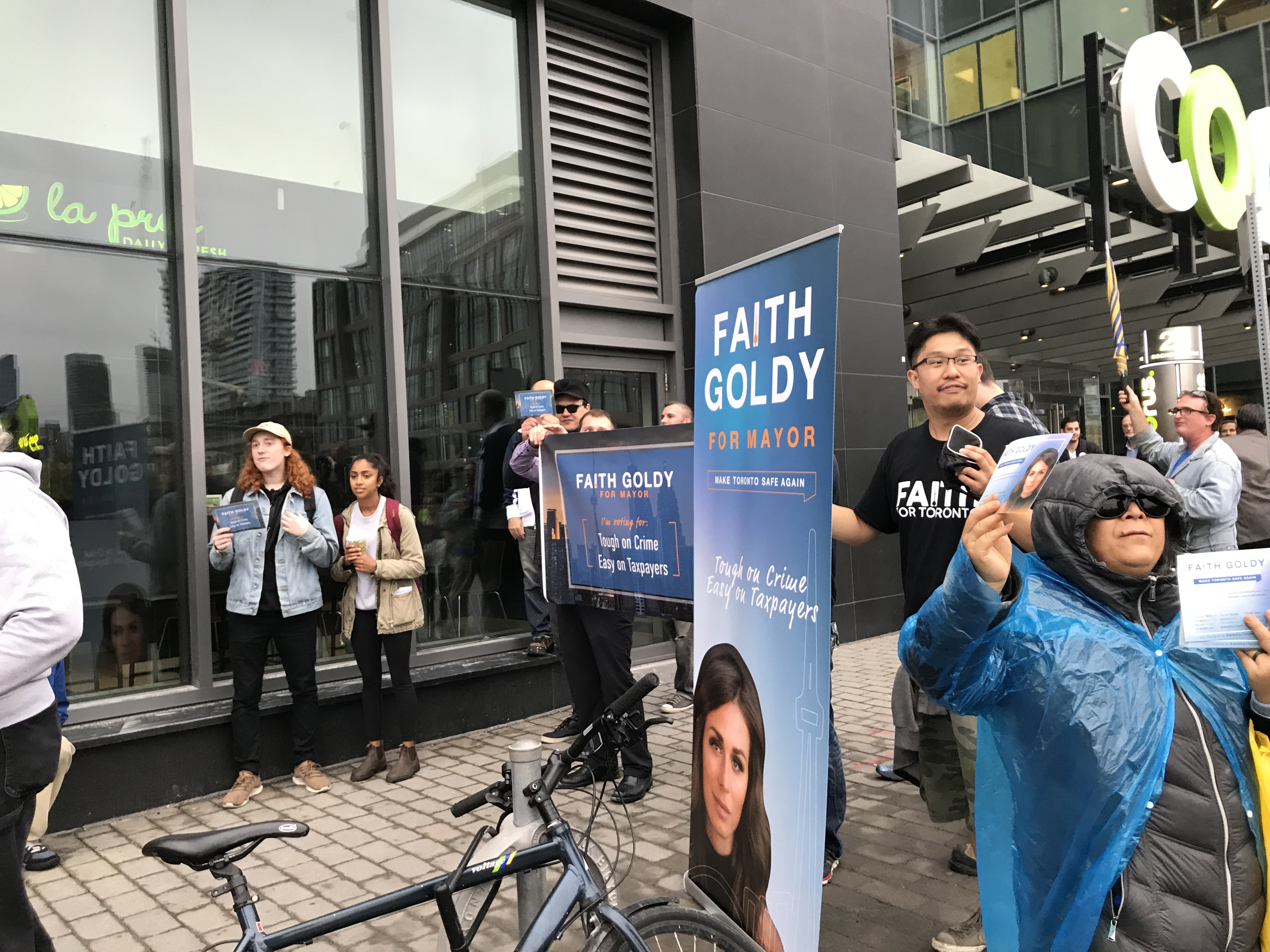
Supporters of Faith Goldy protest outside of Corus Quay in September 2018.

Faith Goldy's share of the vote in the 2018 Toronto mayoral election, in each ward

On July 27, 2018, Goldy registered to run for Mayor in the 2018 Toronto election. Her campaign platform included monitoring the finances of Toronto's Islamic centres and mosques, putting illegal immigrants on buses to either the prime minister's residence or a willing jurisdiction, and banning parades that do not welcome the participation of the Toronto Police Service. Goldy finished a distant third in the race, winning 3.4% of voters.

On his Rebel News show, Ezra Levant said Goldy had gone on a "racist bender" since he fired her and called Goldy's mayoral campaign "a Twitter vanity project" designed to promote her personal brand.

After posing for a photo with Goldy at a political event on September 22, Ontario Premier Doug Ford was repeatedly asked by the opposition New Democratic Party to denounce Goldy. On September 26 Ford tweeted: "I have been clear. I condemn hate speech, anti-Semitism and racism in all forms—be it from Faith Goldy or anyone else."

Goldy was not invited to the first Toronto mayoral debate held September 24 by Artsvote Toronto. Artsvote said all candidates were asked to complete a qualifying form explaining their arts platform, which Goldy had not done. Goldy briefly walked onto the stage during the debate and complained about the organizers before police escorted her away. Goldy was also not invited to the second debate.

Steve King, the Republican U.S. Representative for Iowa's 4th congressional district, endorsed Goldy's campaign in October 2018. King was widely criticized for this endorsement by members of his own party. Steve Stivers, chair of the National Republican Congressional Committee, wrote "we must stand up against white supremacy and hate in all forms." The Washington Examiner called King's endorsement of Goldy "a shameful endorsement of white nationalism."

She also established a close relationship with and was supported by ultra-right anti-Muslim Jews such as Laura Loomer and the Jewish Defense League, as she is also a strong supporter of Israel.

=== Failed lawsuit against Bell Media ===
Bell Media declined to air campaign advertisements Goldy had paid for on its channel CP24 during the campaign. Goldy filed a lawsuit against the company and hired high-profile Toronto lawyer Clayton Ruby to represent her. Rogers Media also declined to air Goldy's campaign ads on its radio stations.

The Ontario Superior Court dismissed the case and ordered Goldy to pay Bell $43,117.90 in legal fees. Justice Peter Cananagh wrote in his decision that Goldy should have made her complaint with the Canadian Radio-television and Telecommunications Commission and not the courts.

=== Audit of finances for mayoral campaign ===
On April 29, 2019, Toronto's compliance audit committee launched an audit of Goldy's campaign expenditures. The complaint was made by Evan Balgord, the executive director of the Canadian Anti-Hate Network, following a YouTube video Goldy posted on October 25, 2018, that asked “defenders of democracy worldwide” to fund her failed lawsuit against Bell Media. Ontario's Municipal Elections Act says campaign contributors must be Ontario residents.

When Goldy argued for the audit's dismissal, she was accused by Toronto municipal elections lawyer Jack Siegel of copying verbatim an argument he wrote in an unrelated case. Siegel volunteered to represent Balgord, and told Canadaland that Goldy's "entire public persona is something that I fundamentally oppose" and that "because she 'borrowed' my material so effectively, she recruited me to the other side."

Chartered accountant William Molson, an auditor tasked by the City of Toronto to review Goldy's election expenses, concluded on January 13, 2022, that Goldy had breached election finance laws.

Molson found Goldy had not reported more than $56,000 in campaign donations during the legal fundraising period, and collected an additional $101,118 after the legal window for donations had closed. The audit also found Goldy illegally accepted donations from people who were not Ontario residents, mixed her personal and campaign finances, and did not co-operate with the committee-ordered audit.

Goldy told the committee her accounting errors came from her lack of experience with municipal election campaigns. She promised to refund any illegal donations. She also said she had no desire to return to politics or a media career, and was "wholly devoted to my private life." On February 8, 2022, the committee voted to send the audit to a provincial prosecutor.

Goldy was scheduled to appear in court on seven campaign finance charges on April 12, 2023. Each charge had a maximum penalty of $25,000.

== Views on politics and race ==
I do not bathe in tears of white guilt. That does not make me a white supremacist.

I oppose state multiculturalism and affirmative action. That does not make me a racist.

I reject cultural relativism. That does not make me a fascist.

— Goldy, in defense of her coverage of the 2017 Unite the Right rally

Goldy's views have been described as far-right, alt-right, white nationalist and white supremacist. Goldy has promoted the white genocide conspiracy theory.

Goldy told the far-right YouTube channel Red Ice "racism is used to pathologize a healthy and natural instinct within people. When anyone tells you you’re a racist or white supremacist, tell them that’s a term of oppression and you do not subscribe to it."

Her beliefs have resulted in criticism, including a petition to rescind her Gordon Cressy Student Leadership Award. GQ labelled her as "one of Canada's most prominent propagandists" of the white genocide conspiracy theory.

Anna Silman, a former classmate of Goldy's at Havergal College, wrote in The Cut that Goldy's brand of White supremacy is "destabilizing, confounding, uncanny ... it's concerned with 'optics.' It doesn't wear a hood or wave a swastika. It portends to be relatable and nonthreatening. It says things it doesn't mean; it denies those it does."

On April 8, 2019, Goldy was banned from Facebook, along with several white nationalists and "individuals and organizations who spread hate, attack, or call for the exclusion of others on the basis of who they are."

In spring 2019, facing legal action by the Canadian Anti-Hate Network, Goldy formally retracted and apologized for spreading an erroneous claim about the group on Twitter.

== Electoral record ==
2018 Toronto Mayoral Election

Candidate	Number of votes	% of popular vote
John Tory (X)	479,659	63.49
Jennifer Keesmaat	178,193	23.59
Faith Goldy	25,667	3.40
Saron Gebresellassi	15,222	2.01
Steven Lam	5,920	0.78
Sarah Climenhaga	4,765	0.63
Kevin Clarke	3,853	0.51
Monowar Hossain	3,602	0.48
Logan Choy	3,518	0.47
Knia Singh	3,244	0.43
Dobrosav Basaric	2,882	0.38
Chris Brosky	2,782	0.37
Jim McMillan	2,422	0.32
Tofazzel Haque	2,307	0.31
Drew Buckingham	1,971	0.26
Mike Gallay	1,940	0.26
Daryl Christoff	1,751	0.23
Gautam Nath	1,474	0.20
Christopher Humphrey	1,428	0.19
Thomas O'Neill	1,325	0.18
D!ONNE Renée	1,280	0.17
Brian Buffey	1,275	0.17
Brian Graff	1,139	0.15
Michael Nicula	1,048	0.14
Andrzej Kardys	1,035	0.14
Joseph Pampena	773	0.10
Jakob Vardy	757	0.10
Kris Langenfeld	695	0.09
James Sears	680	0.09
Chai Kalevar	615	0.08
Jack Weenen	607	0.08
Ion Gelu Vintila	565	0.07
Joseph Osuji	486	0.06
Josh Rachlis	337	0.04
Jim Ruel	276	0.04
Invalid/blank votes		—
Total		
Registered voters/turnout		
