= 2018 Toronto mayoral election =

- October 22, 2018
- Opinion polls
- Turnout: 40.9% (▼13.8 pp)
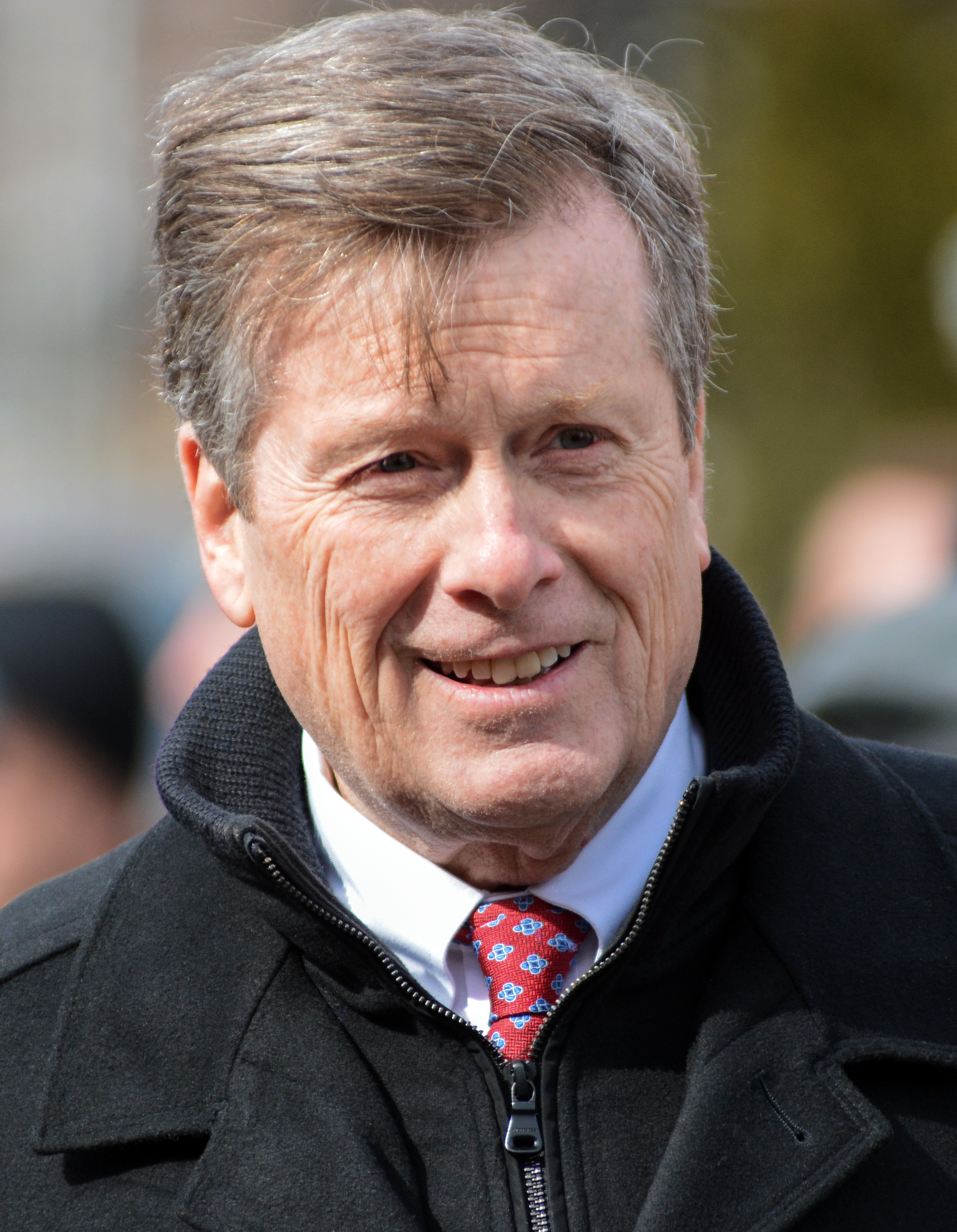

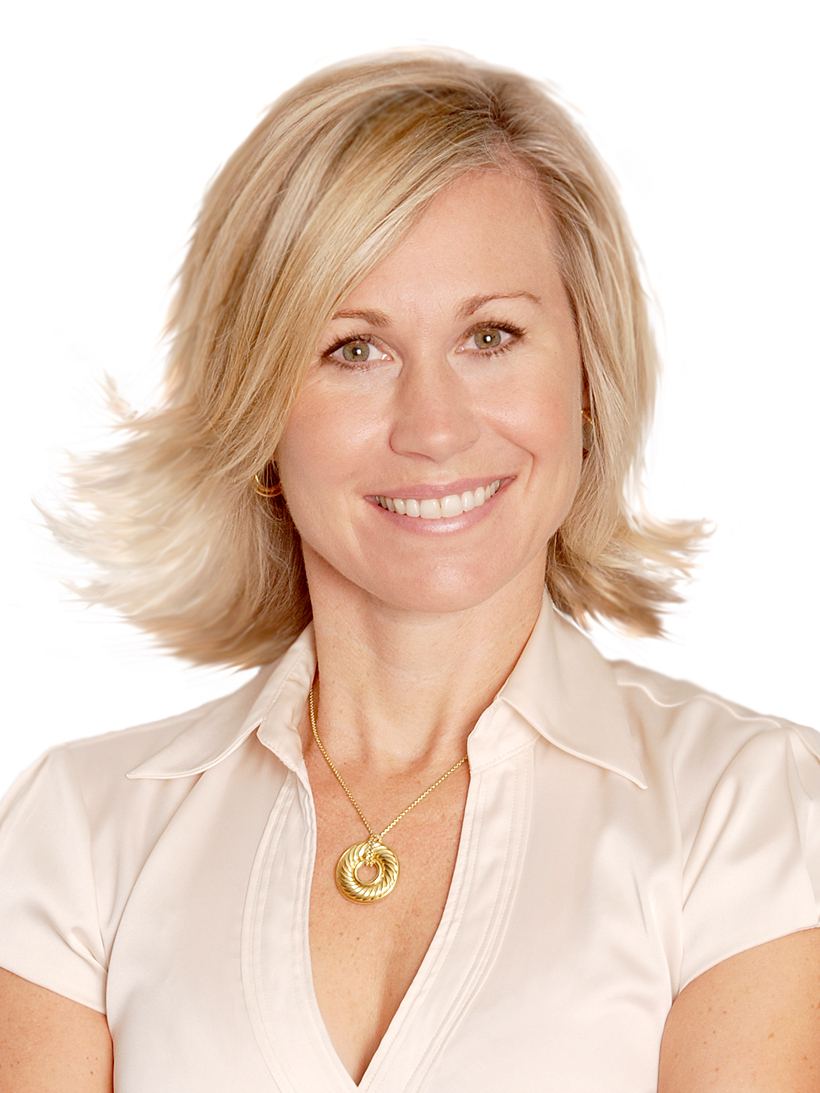
Candidate	John Tory	Jennifer Keesmaat
Popular vote	479,659	178,193
Percentage	63.5%	23.6%
- Results by ward

- Results by polling subdivision
Mayor before election
John Tory
Elected mayor
John Tory

A mayoral election was held on Monday, October 22, 2018, to elect the Mayor of the city of Toronto. Incumbent Mayor John Tory was re-elected for a second term, defeating former Chief City Planner Jennifer Keesmaat with 63.49% of the vote. Tory won all of Toronto’s 25 wards.

Registration for candidates for the office of Mayor officially opened on May 1, 2018, and closed on July 27, 2018, at 2 pm. Incumbent John Tory had been Mayor of Toronto since being elected in 2014 and launched his bid for re-election on May 1, 2018. Former city councillor Doug Ford declared his intent to run, but later withdrew to seek the leadership of the Progressive Conservative Party of Ontario. Former Chief City Planner Jennifer Keesmaat was speculated to be considering entering the race, and after initially indicating she would not run, she announced her candidacy on July 27, 2018, the last day to register as a candidate.

Alt-right commentator Faith Goldy ran in the election as well, but placed a distant third.

== Candidates ==
Official registration for mayoral candidates opened May 1, 2018, and closed on July 27. At the close of nominations, 35 candidates have registered to run in the election.

=== Registered major candidates ===
- John Tory is the incumbent Mayor of Toronto, first elected in 2014 after having lost to David Miller in 2003 and declining to run in 2010. Former CEO of Rogers Media and Rogers Cable, leader of the Progressive Conservative Party of Ontario from 2005–2009, local talk radio host, and former Canadian Football League commissioner.
- Jennifer Keesmaat was appointed Chief City Planner of Toronto by former Mayor Rob Ford in 2012, and was speculated to be considering entering politics when she left the position in 2017. An urban planner and advocate for affordable housing, she initially declined to run for mayor but announced her candidacy on July 27, 2018.

=== All candidates ===
Full list of registered candidates
Candidate name	Nomination date
Dobrosav Basaric	July 26, 2018
Chris Brosky	July 27, 2018
Drew Buckingham	July 27, 2018
Brian Buffey	July 27, 2018
Logan Choy	July 27, 2018
Daryl Christoff	July 27, 2018
Kevin Clarke	May 8, 2018
Sarah Climenhaga	May 1, 2018
Mike Gallay	May 1, 2018
Saron Gebresellassi	May 1, 2018
Faith Goldy	July 27, 2018
Brian Graff	May 1, 2018
Tofazzel Haque	May 7, 2018
Monowar Hossain	July 18, 2018
Christopher Humphrey	July 13, 2018
Chai Kalevar	July 26, 2018
Andrzej Kardys	July 27, 2018
Jennifer Keesmaat	July 27, 2018
Steven Lam	June 5, 2018
Kris Langenfeld	June 29, 2018
Jim McMillan	July 16, 2018
Gautam Nath	June 8, 2018
Michael Nicula	July 26, 2018
Thomas O'Neill	July 12, 2018
Joseph Osuju	July 20, 2018
Joseph Pampena	June 11, 2018
Josh Rachlis	July 27, 2018
D!ONNE Renée	July 27, 2018
Jim Ruel	July 10, 2018
James Sears	May 1, 2018
Knia Singh	June 21, 2018
John Tory	May 1, 2018
Jakob Vardy	July 6, 2018
Ion Gelu Vintila	July 25, 2018
Jack Weenen	July 3, 2018

=== Formerly declared candidates ===
- Doug Ford, former city councillor and runner-up in the 2014 mayoral election, announced his intention to challenge for the office a second time at a September 2017 event. However, he announced in January 2018 that he would seek the leadership of the Progressive Conservative Party of Ontario and would not run in the mayoral election.
- Blayne Lastman, son of former mayor Mel Lastman, declared on July 25 that he would enter the race, but announced a day later that he would not run.

=== Declined candidates ===
- Olivia Chow, placed third in the 2014 mayoral election and former MP for Trinity—Spadina.
- Desmond Cole, advocacy journalist.
- Mike Layton, city councillor for Ward 19 Trinity—Spadina (2010–2022).
- Sue-Ann Levy, on June 17, 2018, Levy appeared on The Rebel Media and said that she was open to the possibility of a 2018 mayoral run.
- Giorgio Mammoliti, former city councillor for Ward 7 York West (2000–2018), former MPP for Yorkview (1990–1995).
- Richard Peddie, former president and CEO of Maple Leaf Sports & Entertainment.

== Debates ==
List of Debates
Date	Hosted by	Participants	Moderator	Ref
September 24, 2018	ArtsVote Toronto	Tory, Keesmaat, Gebresellassi, Climenhaga, Nath		
September 26, 2018	University of Toronto Scarborough	Keesmaat, Gebresellassi, Climenhaga		

== Opinion polls ==
Polling firm	Last date of polling	Link	Keesmaat	Tory	Other
DART Insight and Communications	October 12–15, 2018	PDF	27	62	
Forum Research	October 10, 2018	PDF	29	56	15
Forum Research	October 5, 2018	PDF	29	56	15
Mainstreet Research	September 25, 2018	HTML	31	64	Faith Goldy 2% Sarah Climenhaga 1% Saron Gebressellassi 1% Other 1%
Forum Research	September 24, 2018	PDF	28	56	16
Mainstreet Research	September 16, 2018	HTML	26	62	Faith Goldy 6% Other 6%
Mainstreet Research	September 5, 2018	HTML	28	63	10
Probit Inc.	September 5, 2018	Twitter	31	64	Faith Goldy 3% Other 2%
Forum Research	August 27, 2018	PDF	35	65	
Forum Research	July 27, 2018	PDF	30	70	

== Endorsements ==
	Keesmaat	Tory
City councillors	Kristyn Wong-Tam; Mike Layton; Joe Cressy; Gord Perks; Joe Mihevc	Denzil Minnan-Wong; Jon Burnside; Christin Carmichael Greb; Frances Nunziata
Federal politicians		Shaun Chen (Liberal, Scarborough North); Ali Ehsassi (Liberal, Willowdale); Michael Levitt (Liberal, York Centre); James Maloney (Liberal, Etobicoke-Lakeshore); John McKay (Liberal, Scarborough-Guildwood); Marco Mendicino (Liberal, Eglinton-Lawrence); Rob Oliphant (Liberal, Don Valley West); Yasmin Ratansi (Liberal, Don Valley East); Judy Sgro (Liberal, Humber River-Black Creek); Geng Tan (Liberal, Don Valley North); Borys Wrzesnewskyj (Liberal, Etobicoke Centre); Jean Yip (Liberal, Scarborough-Agincourt)
Provincial politicians	Jessica Bell (NDP, University-Rosedale); Suze Morrison (NDP, Toronto Centre); Marit Stiles (NDP, Davenport); Doly Begum (NDP, Scarborough Southwest)	Mitzie Hunter (Liberal, Scarborough-Guildwood)
Former politicians	Olivia Chow (NDP MP)	Jean Augustine (Liberal MP); John Baird (Conservative MP & MPP); John Carmichael (Conservative MP); Alvin Curling (Liberal MPP); C.S. Leung (Conservative MP); Peter MacKay (Conservative MP); Joe Oliver (Conservative MP); Sandra Pupatello (Liberal MPP)
Media	Daily Xtra; Spacing Magazine	Toronto Sun Toronto Star
Other	Richard Peddie (Former President and CEO MLSE); Richard Underhill (Juno Award winning musician); Toronto & York Region Labour Council; Elementary Teachers of Toronto Guillermo "Gil" Penalosa (World Urban Parks Ambassador) Tabatha Southey Vision Zero Canada Jean Yoon Bruce Arthur (Toronto Star Sports Columnist) Charles Spearin (Broken Social Scene) Edward Keenan (Toronto Star Columnist) Heather Mallick (Toronto Star Columnist)	Director X Claire Emma Kirk Peter MacKay Jeanne Beker Gary Slaight Gordon Nixon Sheetal Jaitly

== Results ==
Official results from the City of Toronto.

Candidate	Number of votes	% of popular vote
John Tory (X)	479,659	63.49
Jennifer Keesmaat	178,193	23.59
Faith Goldy	25,667	3.40
Saron Gebresellassi	15,222	2.01
Steven Lam	5,920	0.78
Sarah Climenhaga	4,765	0.63
Kevin Clarke	3,853	0.51
Monowar Hossain	3,602	0.48
Logan Choy	3,518	0.47
Knia Singh	3,244	0.43
Dobrosav Basaric	2,882	0.38
Chris Brosky	2,782	0.37
Jim McMillan	2,422	0.32
Tofazzel Haque	2,307	0.31
Drew Buckingham	1,971	0.26
Mike Gallay	1,940	0.26
Daryl Christoff	1,751	0.23
Gautam Nath	1,474	0.20
Christopher Humphrey	1,428	0.19
Thomas O'Neill	1,325	0.18
D!ONNE Renée	1,280	0.17
Brian Buffey	1,275	0.17
Brian Graff	1,139	0.15
Michael Nicula	1,048	0.14
Andrzej Kardys	1,035	0.14
Joseph Pampena	773	0.10
Jakob Vardy	757	0.10
Kris Langenfeld	695	0.09
James Sears	680	0.09
Chai Kalevar	615	0.08
Jack Weenen	607	0.08
Ion Gelu Vintila	565	0.07
Joseph Osuji	486	0.06
Josh Rachlis	337	0.04
Jim Ruel	276	0.04
Invalid/blank votes		—
Total		
Registered voters/turnout		

=== Maps ===
Percentage of votes cast for Jennifer Keesmaat by ward

Percentage of votes cast for Faith Goldy by ward

Percentage of votes cast for Saron Gebresellassi by ward
