= Brian Lilley =

Canadian journalist

- Education: Mohawk College
- Occupations: Broadcaster, columnist, commentator
- Movement: Conservatism

Brian Lilley is a Canadian conservative columnist, author, television show host. He is the provincial and national political columnist for the Toronto Sun. He has worked in radio, television and print across Canada. He hosted a radio show on 580 CFRA in Ottawa, and was the senior correspondent for the now defunct Sun News Network in Ottawa, covering Parliament Hill.

== Career ==
=== Early career ===
Lilley joined the staff of 940 News in Montreal as a reporter in September 2000. While with 940 News, Lilley covered local, provincial and federal politics as well as international events such as the G20 conference in Montreal in November 2001 and the Summit of the Americas in Quebec City in April 2001.

During the three day conference, which was marked by violent protests, Lilley provided coverage for radio stations across Canada as well as live coverage for CNN Radio and Television. In 2002 Lilley moved from 940 News in Montreal to Newstalk 580 CFRA in Ottawa.

From 2002 until 2005, Lilley was a beat reporter for CFRA covering local, provincial and occasionally federal politics for the station. This included attending the funerals of several of the early casualties of Canada's contribution to the War in Afghanistan that were stationed at CFB Petawawa.

In March 2005, Lilley began a five-year run as the Ottawa Bureau Chief for what was then Standard Radio. He covered the 2006 election that saw Stephen Harper and the Conservatives replace Paul Martin's Liberals.

=== Sun News Network ===
Lilley joined the Sun News Network as soon as the station was announced in June 2010. He hosted the television program Byline with Brian Lilley from April 2011 until the station shut down in February 2015. The show was taped in Ottawa, Ontario.

Byline usually included a 10-minute introduction followed by two or three interviews lasting 10 to 15 minutes, then a final 10-minute conclusion where Lilley reads emails from viewers, shows a funny or interesting video, or speaks about an upcoming event.

On February 13, 2015, Sun News Network was shut down. A repeat episode of his show, Byline with Brian Lilley, was the last program to air before ceasing operations at 5 a.m. ET.

While with Sun News he also wrote a weekly column that appeared in more than 30 newspapers owned by Québecor Média at the time, including the Toronto Sun, The London Free Press, Calgary Sun, and Fort McMurray Today.

=== Rebel News ===
After the shuttering of Sun News, Lilley co-founded Rebel Media with Sun News colleague Ezra Levant. He quit the organization in 2017 shortly after Faith Goldy covered Unite the Right rally in Charlottesville, Virginia.

On his Facebook page, he said the startup had a "lack of editorial and behavioural judgment" which he deemed "destructive." He also said he had become uncomfortable with what he felt was "an increasingly harsh tone" towards immigration and Islam."

In an interview with the CBC Radio program As It Happens, Lilley said he had left his duties as co-founder roughly one year before his departure and had been working as a freelancer, citing "a drift for a while and a difference in focus” at the outlet. Lilley said his final conversation with Levant had not ended well, but kept details of their conversation to himself.

=== Return to talk radio ===
In March 2016, Lilley joined Bell Media in Ottawa at 580 News CFRA and hosted a radio show until January 2019. Beyond the News with Brian Lilley featured Lilley's commentary on Canadian federal, Ontario provincial, and Ottawa municipal politics. Lilley's show was critical of Prime Minister Justin Trudeau and Ontario Premier Kathleen Wynne. Lilley styled himself as the "Unofficial Leader of the Opposition" on his show in promotional material for the radio station.

On January 11, 2019, the Toronto Sun announced that Brian Lilley would be joining the newspaper as a full-time political columnist.

On March 26, 2021, the outlet Canadaland reported that Lilley was in a relationship with Ivana Yelich, the director of media relations for Premier Doug Ford. This relationship had started sometime in 2019 but had not been disclosed to readers. Canadaland pointed out that Lilley had criticized Toronto Star columnist Robert Benzies in 2018 for being married to Rhonda McMichael, a non-partisan civil servant whom Lilley claimed was “a top communications staffer” for Wynne. When Benzies responded that his wife's job was non-partisan, Lilley said his point was still valid because it was “something most readers don’t know.”

== Focus ==
Lilley is a conservative who has written about and discussed topics such as the perceived shortcomings of elected governments, social conservatism, government spending and use of tax revenue, and the culture of political correctness. Lilley is also a regular critic of the Canadian Broadcasting Corporation (CBC).

== Author ==
In 2012, Lilley published a book titled CBC Exposed. In it, Lilley outlines what he sees as abuse of taxpayers' money by CBC executives and officials and a lack of transparency at the corporation.
