= Laura Loomer =

American far-right political activist (born 1993)

- Loomer in 2026
- Born: Laura Elizabeth Loomer; May 21, 1993 (age 33); Tucson, Arizona, U.S.
- Education: Barry University (BS)
- Occupation: Political activist
- Years active: 2015–present
- Known for: Political commentary; conspiracy theories; misinformation
- Political party: Republican
- Movement: Far-right; alt-right; anti-Islam; Trumpism; white nationalism
- Website: loomered.com

Laura Elizabeth Loomer (born May 21, 1993) is an American far-right (Note: Sources describing Loomer as "far-right" include: Blake, Andrew (November 16, 2017). "Twitter strips blue verification badges from racists amid authentication policy overhaul". The Washington Times.; Mansell, William (August 12, 2018). "Two Muslim congressional candidates confronted by Laura Loomer at campaign event". Newsweek.; Golshan, Tara (August 14, 2018). "Ilhan Omar, a progressive Muslim woman, wins Minnesota primary for Keith Ellison's House seat". Vox.; Barrouquere, Brett (August 31, 2018). "In unusual alliance, Infowars, Joey Gibson teaming up for 'street army' teams". Hatewatch. Southern Poverty Law Center.; Darrah, Nicole (September 5, 2018). "Rep. Billy Long, an auctioneer, drowns out protester shouting at Twitter's Jack Dorsey during hearing". Fox News.; "WATCH: A fast-talking auctioneer-turned-Congressman drowned out this far-right protester". PBS NewsHour. Associated Press. September 5, 2018.; Barnes, Tom (September 6, 2018). "Congressman drowns out conspiracy theorist Laura Loomer with auctioneer skills at Twitter hearing". The Independent.; Farzan, Antonia Noori (September 6, 2018). "How Rep. Billy Long's auctioneering past made him the breakout star of the Twitter hearings". The Washington Post.; Madani, Doha; Wodinsky, Shoshana (November 29, 2018). "Far-right activist Laura Loomer cuffed herself to Twitter's NYC headquarters; police removed her". NBC News.; Leskin, Paige (November 30, 2018). "Laura Loomer, a far-right activist who tweeted anti-Muslim remarks about Minnesota Rep.-elect Ilhan Omar, handcuffed herself to Twitter's headquarters after the company kicked her off the platform". Business Insider.; Anapol, Avery (February 5, 2019). "Far-right activist Laura Loomer banned from PayPal". The Hill.; Sommer, Will (February 5, 2019). "PayPal Bans Anti-Muslim Fanatic Laura Loomer". The Daily Beast.) political activist, conspiracy theorist, (Note: Sources describing Loomer as a "conspiracy theorist" include: Leonard, Mike (April 13, 2020). "Facebook Defends Decision to Ban Laura Loomer as Dangerous". Bloomberg Law. Archived from the original on October 20, 2020.; Watson, Kathryn (August 18, 2020). "Far-right candidate Laura Loomer wins GOP primary for district that covers Mar-a-Lago". CBS News. Archived from the original on August 19, 2020.; Pengelly, Martin (August 14, 2023). "Trump praises 'terrific' white supremacist conspiracy theorist". The Guardian. ISSN 0261-3077.; Gans, Jared (April 7, 2023). "Marjorie Taylor Greene warns Trump against hiring Laura Loomer". Yahoo News.; Ecarma, Caleb (October 24, 2023). "Tom Emmer Might Not Even Need Trump's Endorsement". Vanity Fair.; Gray, Delilah (November 11, 2023). "Donald Trump Jr. Is Already Angling to Get This Controversial Internet Personality to Be Father's Donald's Press Secretary". Yahoo Entertainment.; Bedigan, Mike (October 6, 2023). "Fervent Trump ally turns up at DeSantis fundraiser — and raises hell". The Independent.; Debusmann Jr, Bernd; Thomas, Merlyn (September 12, 2024). "Laura Loomer: Who is conspiracy theorist travelling with Trump?". BBC News. London: BBC.; Singh, Kanishka; Borter, Gabriella (September 12, 2024). "White House condemns Trump ties to conspiracy theorist Laura Loomer". Reuters. London: Thomson Reuters.; "Trump ally Laura Loomer in racism row after 'curry' jab at Kamala Harris' Indian heritage". South China Morning Post. Hong Kong: Alibaba Group. September 13, 2024.; Pisani, Joseph (September 12, 2024). "Trump Ally Laura Loomer's Racist Comments Draw Rebuke From Graham, Greene". The Wall Street Journal. New York City: News Corp.) and internet personality. Born in Tucson, Arizona, Loomer has worked as an activist for several organizations, including Project Veritas, the Geller Report, Rebel News, and InfoWars. She has described herself as "pro-white nationalist" (Note: Sources describing Loomer as a "white nationalist" include: Maher, Henry (2025). "The neoliberal Great Replacement theory: on the racialization of markets and migration". Distinktion: Journal of Social Theory. 27: 83–101. doi:10.1080/1600910X.2025.2499827. ISSN 1600-910X.; Dorn, Sara. "Marjorie Taylor Greene Blasts Possible Trump Campaign Hire Loomer—Calls Her 'Unstable And A Documented Liar'". Forbes. Archived from the original on November 23, 2023.; Haberman, Maggie; Swan, Jonathan (April 7, 2023). "Trump Wanted to Hire Laura Loomer, Anti-Muslim Activist". The New York Times. ISSN 0362-4331. Archived from the original on April 7, 2023.; Petrizzo, Zachary (March 8, 2021). "Leaked Laura Loomer audio reveals she supports a 'white ethnostate'". The Daily Dot.; Rohrlich, Justin (March 8, 2021). "Audio:Anti-Muslim Activist Laura Loomer Backed Idea of 'White Ethnostate' in 2017 Podcast". The Daily Beast.) and a "proud Islamophobe", (Note: Sources describing Loomer as a self-described "proud Islamophobe" include: Cillizza, Chris (August 19, 2020). "A self-described 'proud Islamophobe' banned from social media just won a GOP nomination | CNN Politics". CNN.; Naughtie, Andrew (August 19, 2020). "Far-right 'proud Islamophobe' Laura Loomer wins Republican primary in Florida". The Independent.; Pengelly, Martin (August 14, 2023). "Trump praises 'terrific' white supremacist conspiracy theorist". The Guardian. ISSN 0261-3077.; Dorn, Sara. "Marjorie Taylor Greene Blasts Possible Trump Campaign Hire Loomer—Calls Her 'Unstable And A Documented Liar'". Forbes. Archived from the original on November 23, 2023.) repeatedly making racist and anti-Muslim statements in public settings. (Note: Sources describing Loomer as making racist comments include: Gomez Licon, Adriana (April 3, 2025). "A look at Laura Loomer, longtime Trump ally criticized for racist posts and Sept. 11 conspiracies". Associated Press.; Ibrahim, Nur (July 3, 2025). "Laura Loomer posts about feeding 'illegals' to alligators are real". Snopes.; Breland, Ali (April 5, 2025). "Laura Loomer Is a Warning". Atlantic Magazine. Archived from the original on April 5, 2025. (Archived Link added on September 23, 2025); Gold, Michael (September 13, 2024). "Trump Claims Ignorance of Laura Loomer's 9/11 Conspiracy Theories". New York Times.; Walsh, Kelsey; Kim, Soo Rin; Ibassa, Lalee (September 13, 2024). "Far-right activist Laura Loomer pushes back amid criticism of her proximity to Trump". ABC News.; Marchel Hoff, Maya (September 15, 2024). "Vance dodges questions on Laura Loomer's racist comments about Harris". USA Today.; Media Matters Staff Hoff (September 5, 2024). "Trump ally Laura Loomer calls Kamala Harris, Fani Willis, and Letitia James "meritless DEI Shaniquas"". Media Matters for America.; Walker, Josephine (July 20, 2024). "Laura Loomer Cheers Rep. Sheila Jackson Lee's Death in Racist Rant". The Daily Beast.) (Note: Sources describing Loomer as "anti-Muslim" include: Kampeas, Ron (August 19, 2020). "Jewish anti-Muslim provocateur Laura Loomer wins GOP primary in Florida". The Times of Israel.; Beauchamp, Zack (August 19, 2020). "Laura Loomer, the anti-Muslim congressional candidate praised by Trump, explained". Vox.; Sommer, Will (February 5, 2019). "PayPal Bans Anti-Muslim Fanatic Laura Loomer". The Daily Beast.; Cillizza, Chris (August 19, 2020). "A self-described 'proud Islamophobe' banned from social media just won a GOP nomination". CNN.; Kampeas, Ron (August 19, 2020). "Laura Loomer, Jewish provocateur known for anti-Muslim rhetoric, wins House primary in Florida". Jewish Telegraphic Agency.; "Anti-Muslim extremist and conspiracy theorist wins Republican primary". The Guardian. August 19, 2020. ISSN 0261-3077.; Pengelly, Martin (August 14, 2023). "Trump praises 'terrific' white supremacist conspiracy theorist". The Guardian.; Abdelaziz, Rowaida (August 20, 2022). "Laura Loomer, A Self-Described Islamophobe, is Running for Congress Again". HuffPost.) She hosts a show, Loomer Unleashed, streaming weekly on Rumble.

Loomer has been banned on numerous social media platforms, including Facebook, Instagram, and formerly Twitter (now X, where she has since been reinstated), as well as on payment processors, and vehicle-for-hire and food delivery mobile apps, for violating policies on hate speech and misinformation. Loomer has been banned and removed from a number of events, and has had her press credentials revoked for alleged harassment and causing disturbances.

Loomer was the Republican Party nominee to represent Florida's 21st congressional district in the 2020 United States House of Representatives elections, and lost to the Democratic Party candidate Lois Frankel. She ran in the Republican primary for Florida's 11th congressional district in 2022, losing to incumbent Daniel Webster. In April 2023, Donald Trump sought to hire Loomer for his presidential campaign, but his senior campaign advisors successfully discouraged Trump from doing so. By September 2024, some Trump supporters and others had expressed concerns about Loomer's continuing influence on Trump.

During the second presidency of Donald Trump starting in 2025, Loomer emerged as an increasingly influential actor, using her social media platform to call for the firing of officials she deems insufficiently loyal to Trump. In early April 2025, reports emerged that Loomer influenced President Trump to dismiss more than half a dozen national security officials due to her suspicions of their disloyalty to him, and that Loomer had continued to advocate for additional firings. For years Loomer was a critic of American military aid to Ukraine, but reversed her position in July 2026, saying she had been misled by Russian propaganda; she subsequently visited Kyiv, where she interviewed President Volodymyr Zelenskyy.

== Early life and education ==
Laura Elizabeth Loomer was born in Tucson, Arizona, on May 21, 1993. Loomer's father is a rheumatologist, and her mother is a nurse. Loomer and her two brothers were raised in Arizona. She stated that she grew up in a "very violent household", primarily because her younger brother suffered from mental illness. Her parents broke up when she was 12 years old and she was sent to a boarding school shortly thereafter. She attended Mount Holyoke College in Massachusetts, leaving after one semester; she said she felt targeted for being conservative. She transferred to Barry University in Miami Shores, Florida, and graduated in 2015 with a bachelor's degree in broadcast journalism.

== Activities ==
=== 2015–2017 ===
In March 2015, Loomer used a concealed video camera to record her conversations with Barry University officials discussing the idea of starting a club called "Sympathetic Students in Support of the Islamic State of Iraq and Syria". The school apparently asked only that the club's name be changed to "Students in Support of the Middle East". James O'Keefe of Project Veritas, a right-wing organization known for producing secretly recorded and deceptively edited undercover audio and video investigations about media organizations and left-leaning groups, released the video of the encounter, alleging that it captured a university official unfazed by the idea of an on-campus organization to support ISIS. Shortly thereafter, the university suspended Loomer for violating the student code of conduct and a professor shown in the video filed criminal charges against her for recording him without his knowledge. At the time, Loomer was an honors student in her senior year and the president of Barry University's Young Republicans Club.

According to a Hillary Clinton campaign official, Loomer and two other women posing as Clinton supporters attempted to "entrap" campaign workers into accepting illegal cash donations in July 2015. The official said the campaign had complied with the law.

On November 8, 2016, the day of the 2016 U.S. presidential election, Loomer, as part of a Project Veritas stunt, went to a polling station dressed in a burqa and asked for a ballot under the name of Huma Abedin.

On June 10, 2017, she gave a speech to a crowd of "anti-Sharia" marchers in New York City organized by ACT for America and condemned "liberals who aligned themselves with Sharia law". She put a burqa on the Fearless Girl statue at its original Bowling Green location in lower Manhattan. A few days later, Loomer left Project Veritas for the Canadian far-right website The Rebel Media.

==== Julius Caesar play protest ====
Her first stunt for Rebel Media was on June 16, 2017, when she disrupted a Shakespeare in the Park presentation of Julius Caesar in New York City, walking on stage during the live performance shortly after the title character was assassinated. The Delacorte Theatre production reimagined Julius Caesar as Donald Trump with a Slovenian-accented actress as his wife, Calpurnia. Before being escorted offstage by security, Loomer shouted, "This is violence against Donald Trump! Stop the normalization of political violence against the right! This is unacceptable!" Loomer was arrested for disorderly conduct and criminal trespassing. Earlier in the week, performances of the play had elicited criticism for depicting women and minorities perpetrating the violent assassination of Trump as U.S. president.

The Public Theater New York responded by saying although they are "champions" of the First Amendment, the disruption was caused by "social media". On June 19, Alyssa Rosenberg of The Washington Post wrote that she did not believe Loomer was genuinely offended by the play, but was looking for attention and to collect a US$1,000 bounty that alt-right social media personality Mike Cernovich had offered to anyone who disrupted the production. Appearing on the Fox News program Hannity a few days after her arrest, Loomer said she knew that disrupting the play would result in criminal charges against her. During the interview, she objected to the depiction of Caesar in the play and accused the left of "systematically and programmatically" using "free expression as a pretext to incite violence".

A "Free Laura" website, soliciting donations for her arrest expenses, had been purchased by Loomer's employer, Rebel Media owner Ezra Levant, six hours before the play started. Loomer also promoted a crowdfunding page for donations, which received $12,385 from 241 contributors: more money than the normal penalties for the charges she was facing.

In August 2017, she was one of several counter-jihad activists who were appointed "Shillman Fellows", with Robert J. Shillman contributing to her salary.

In September 2017, after three months, she resigned from Rebel Media.

Since then, she has occasionally reported for the American far-right conspiracy theory and fake news website InfoWars, as well as the Geller Report and the American Freedom Defense Initiative.

=== 2019 ===
On January 14, 2019, Loomer convinced several men she met in a Home Depot parking lot, who she claimed were undocumented, to jump the fence with her at Nancy Pelosi's Napa, California, home. The group set up a tent on Pelosi's lawn to protest immigration before being removed by police. They were not arrested. A few days later, Loomer attempted to interrupt a speaker at the 2019 Women's March in Washington, D.C., appearing onstage to call the Women's March a "Nazi" organization. As she was escorted off by security, she shouted, "What about the Jews?" in an apparent reference to the national organizers' recent anti-semitism controversy. On January 30, 2019, Loomer and others jumped the wall surrounding the California Governor's Mansion in Sacramento. They wore Mexican serapes and sombreros, with one wearing a large false mustache, and said they were protesting Governor Gavin Newsom's stance on immigration. They were arrested, given citations, and released within a few hours. Later that day, the group provoked a confrontation outside a Mexican restaurant in downtown Sacramento, live-streaming the event.

=== 2020–2022 ===
Loomer unsuccessfully campaigned twice for a seat in the US House of Representatives during this period.

=== 2023–2024 ===
In 2023, Loomer began her Rumble show, Loomer Unleashed. The content of the show includes monologues, pranks, and confronting politicians in public.

In 2024, Loomer continued to support the campaign of Donald Trump, telling The Washington Post, "I'm happy to dedicate all my time to helping Trump, because if Trump doesn't get back in, I don't have anything." During the 2024 US presidential campaign, Loomer was frequently seen at public events with then-candidate Donald Trump, although Trump issued a statement on Truth Social that she was not working for the campaign and is "a private citizen and longtime supporter." She was brought as a guest by Trump to Philadelphia, where he engaged in the September 10 presidential debate with opponent Kamala Harris. The following day, Loomer attended events alongside Trump commemorating the September 11 attacks. Loomer had previously endorsed claims that 9/11 "was an inside job".

According to anonymous sources on the Trump presidential campaign in 2024, Loomer reportedly influenced Trump to publicly endorse various false conspiracy theories, including the claim that Kamala Harris hid her black heritage and the Springfield pet-eating hoax alleging Haitian immigrants were eating other people's household pets. Loomer also posted a tweet referencing stereotypes of Indians, saying that if Harris, who is half-East Indian, were elected president, "the White House will smell like curry & White House speeches will be facilitated via a call center." Marjorie Taylor Greene, a far-right member of the House of Representatives, condemned this remark as "appalling and extremely racist".

In 2024, as part of a promotional deal for a pet food brand, Pawsitive, Loomer filmed herself eating dog food on her Rumble channel.

Days before the 2024 presidential election, Loomer accused Robert F. Kennedy Jr. of misrepresenting a fundraiser, in which Kennedy was seeking donations to support Donald Trump's election campaign. Loomer claimed the money would be spent on re-payments to the Democratic party given Kennedy's previous primary run with the party. This resulted in online backlash from members of the MAGA movement, including Roger Stone.

=== 2025–present ===
During Donald Trump's second term as president, Loomer has emerged as an actor of considerable influence.

While she has not held a formal advisory role in the White House, she is known to have given advice to President Trump on foreign policy. She is perhaps best known for being a "loyalty enforcer" of the president, so much so that her name has been used as a verb—"Loomered", meaning to be fired or damaged in some way for alleged disloyalty. (Note: Antonia Hitchens writes that Loomer's vetting crusades have brought about a new Washington colloquialism. "Bro, I got Loomered," a current Administration official said over drinks. David Sacks, Trump's A.I. czar, mentioned on a podcast that A.I. critics ought to be "Loomered." Trump himself has said, "If you're Loomered, you're in deep trouble. That's the end of your career, in a sense." Loomer describes her project as a constant purge. "Every day, I find a new one," she told me. "It's never going to end." "Loomered" is also used in the name of her company, Loomered Strategies, an opposition research firm; her website, loomered.com, and her autobiography, Loomered: How I Became the Most Banned Woman in the World) Loomer has described her role as no different from that of an investigative reporter who informs the public, or as similar to anti-communist senator Joseph McCarthy, whom she admires. Others (in the Trump administration) have characterized her as a "one-person wrecking crew ... part loyal bagman, part Roy Cohn figure", whose attacks are disproportionate to the offenses of her victims. (Note: "one veteran political operative" told Antonia Hitchens, "You just feed her any sort of D.E.I. comment that some executive made over the last twelve years—then you just expect total anarchy and a wide blast zone.")

Loomer's targets have included Adam Schleifer, an assistant United States attorney in Los Angeles, who was fired one hour after Loomer called for his removal on March 28, 2025. On April 2, Loomer had an Oval Office meeting with President Trump in which she argued that several of his staffers were not sufficiently committed to his agenda. During the meeting, Loomer said Deputy National Security Adviser Alex Nelson Wong once worked for the 2012 presidential campaign of Mitt Romney, while his wife had clerked for Justice Sonia Sotomayor and was involved in the prosecutions of January 6 U.S. Capitol rioters. She also criticized a dozen other aides. The next day, more than a half-dozen members on the United States National Security Council, including the senior director for intelligence Brian Walsh and the senior director for international organizations Maggie Dougherty, along with the director of the National Security Agency General Timothy D. Haugh and his deputy Wendy Noble, were dismissed over the issue of their loyalty towards Trump. (Note: Noble was reassigned to the office of the Under Secretary of Defense for Intelligence and Security.) Also fired were Thomas Boodry, Senior Director for Legislative Affairs and David Feith, Senior Director for Technology and National Security. Feith was trying to limit the export of the most advanced American AI chips, something that ran against the interests of the UAE, which was offering 2 billion dollars to Trump's crypto firm World Liberty if the deal came to pass. After the dismissals, Loomer advocated for further firings and was quoted by The New York Times saying, "In my opinion President Trump should re-evaluate his entire National Security Council." Trump said Loomer had nothing to do with the firings. Wong, who Loomer referred to as the "Chinese Deputy National Security Adviser" and accused of working on behalf of the Chinese Communist Party, was removed from office on May 1.

In April 2025, Terry Adirim was fired from her role as a senior executive at the Central Intelligence Agency's Center for Global Health Services after being targeted by Loomer. In May 2025, Trump withdrew the nomination of Janette Nesheiwat for Surgeon General of the United States after Loomer criticized Nesheiwat for misrepresenting her medical credentials and for her public support of vaccines. In July 2025, Loomer publicly took credit for the firing of Maurene Comey from the Department of Justice, after what she described as a "two month long pressure campaign" on Attorney General Pam Bondi. On July 25, April Doss was fired from her role as the general counsel of the National Security Agency after Loomer had retweeted an article by The Daily Caller attacking her. On July 29, after Loomer called for him to be fired, Vinay Prasad was dismissed as the Director of the Center for Biologics Evaluation and Research despite opposition from Health and Human Services Secretary Robert F. Kennedy Jr. and FDA Commissioner Marty Makary. On July 30, Army Secretary Daniel P. Driscoll ordered the United States Military Academy to rescind an employment offer to cybersecurity expert Jen Easterly, who Loomer criticized for serving under Joe Biden. In August, CNN reported Loomer had spoken to Defense Secretary Pete Hegseth to discuss her work on finding disloyal employees in the Department of Defense. In August 2025, Loomer took credit for the firing of an Iranian-American State Department press office official on Twitter, calling him a jihadi and a "pro-Iranian regime muslim." She further said there are a number of jihadi and jihadi sympathizers within the US government who need to be rooted out.

In August 2025, Loomer criticized the United States Army Twitter account for sharing a post commemorating the thirteenth anniversary of Captain Florent Groberg tackling a suicide bomber and saving the lives of his unit while on patrol in Kunar Province, Afghanistan, an event for which Groberg received the Medal of Honor. Loomer wrote on Twitter: "Are we supposed to believe the Army couldn't find a Republican and US born soldier?" Groberg is a naturalized citizen who spoke on behalf of Hillary Clinton's 2016 presidential campaign. Loomer further complained regarding Secretary of the Army Dan Driscoll, a Trump appointee, that "there have been several instances of either [Driscoll], or the Army promoting anti-Trump Leftists on their official social media channels." Loomer's comments received bipartisan condemnation from both veterans and politicians. Groberg replied, "I've served under presidents from both parties and will always honor my oath to this country. Yes, I spoke for 60 seconds at the DNC when asked about service and sacrifice, not politics. For me, [August 8th] isn't about parties. It's about the lives we lost." Loomer doubled down following criticism, stating, "I got a call from a reporter a few minutes ago asking me if I'm deleting my tweet below. I said no. I don't care about the outrage mob. And I am right to be posting about this." Loomer further said that the Army had used "weight behind the [Medal of Honor] to issue partisan political attacks and undermine the Commander in Chief."

The United States Department of State announced in August 2025 that it was suspending all visitor visas for Palestinians from Gaza following criticism from Loomer. A group of Palestinians had been granted visas to enter the United States to obtain emergency medical treatment unavailable in Gaza due to the Gaza war. Loomer responded to a video of wounded Palestinian children arriving at an American airport by stating that Palestinian visitors were "Islamic Invaders" and said that "We didn't vote for mass migration of jihadis into our country. This is America Last. They need to be rounded up and deported." Loomer demanded that "the Trump administration needs to shut this abomination down ASAP before a family member of one of these GAZANS goes rogue and kills Americans for HAMAS." U.S Representatives Chip Roy and Randy Fine endorsed Loomer's demand. Loomer subsequently took credit for the State Department's decision to suspend visas, saying she had spoken over the phone with Secretary of State Marco Rubio about the issue.

In November 2025, President Trump withdrew the nomination of Donald Korb for the position of Commissioner of the IRS after Loomer criticized Korb for previously donating to Democrats. Loomer took credit for the failure of Korb's nomination.

The Trump administration removed sanctions on former President of Srpska Milorad Dodik following lobbying from Loomer and other conservatives, including Rudy Giuliani and Michael Flynn. Dodik had been criminally convicted and removed from office for undermining the Dayton Accords, the peace agreement which ended the Bosnian War. The Biden administration had imposed sanctions on Dodik in 2022 for his disregard of the Dayton Accords, in addition to allegations of corruption and graft. The Trump administration detained Sami Hamdi, a British pro-Palestinian journalist, while Hamdi was on a speaking tour of the United States following lobbying on social media by Loomer. Loomer claimed that Hamdi had expressed support for Hamas and took credit for his detention. Hamdi was released after two weeks in detention and said that Loomer had "failed emphatically."

Following the assassination of Charlie Kirk in September 2025, Laura Loomer said that transgender people were "a national security threat" and called for them to be socially ostracized and declared a terrorist movement, despite the shooter not being transgender. Julie Curlee, a transgender former CIA analyst, said she was fired from her job briefing White House officials after Loomer posted about a transgender "Biden holdover who hates President Trump".

Loomer had a confrontation with Indian news anchor Rajdeep Sardesai at the India Today Conclave in New Delhi in March 2026, with Sardesai blaming Loomer of anti-Indian and Islamophobic remarks, with Loomer retorting back sharply.

In July 2026, Loomer interviewed Ukrainian president Volodymyr Zelenskyy on Rumble, mainly interviewing him over relations with the Trump Administration and the Russo-Ukrainian war. Loomer previously dismissed the war and lent credence to Russian talking points endorsing the legality of the war before apologizing over her conduct. She also criticized Russia for striking the Dormition Cathedral of Kyiv-Pechersk Lavra in Kyiv.

Loomer claimed responsibility for the deportation of British commentator Milo Yiannopoulos by ICE on August 28, 2026. Yiannopoulos and Loomer have feuded since 2024, when Yiannopoulos posted claims online that Loomer had previously been institutionalized. According to US border czar Tom Homan, ICE had received multiple tip-offs about Yiannopoulos, some of which may have come from Loomer.

==== Allegations of pay-to-play ====
Some critics of Loomer and observers of American national politics have complained that professional lobbyists have taken notice as Loomer's power in the Trump administration has become greater and more obvious, and Loomer's motives in influencing may have broadened beyond punishing alleged opponents of Trump. She has been noted for taking an unusual interest in "the most obscure things that only a lobbyist would care about," according to one anonymous Trump administration-connected source. Popular influencers having great impact on public policy and being paid accordingly, are part of "an ascendant model", according to Hitchens. Because influencing is a relatively new industry, there are few or no lobbying regulations on it, unlike traditional lobbying, and it operates in a "grey zone".

Some of the "obscure" issues that have interested her include Hewlett Packard Enterprise's acquisition of Juniper Networks, lifting sanctions on Venezuela's oil sector (a subject on which he wrote "a long and very technically detailed post), firing the financial-oversight management board involved in Puerto Rico's public-energy contracts, and ousting a Food and Drug Administration scientist (Vinay Prasad) who was attempting to place a hold on a muscular-dystrophy drug for safety reasons that would have been very expensive for its pharmaceutical maker (Note: the following week Prasad resigned, "under pressure", according to Hitchens) – issues outside the usual interests of MAGA politics or contrary to traditional Republican positions (lifting sanctions on Venezuela).

When asked by journalist Antonia Hitchens about whether Loomer was receiving compensation for advocating for lifting sanctions on Venezuelan petroleum that an American oil magnate (Harry Sargeant III) sought to buy, a "popular Trump-connected lobbyist" replied, "Hell, yeah, she's getting paid!", seeing nothing wrong with that. Lobbyist payment to Loomer allegedly goes through middlemen to avoid the appearance of any political impurity in her MAGA zeal. Asked about being influenced by donors and lobbyists, Loomer has replied that, "I am actually [a] very qualified, and I'm highly accomplished" person able to make detailed technical arguments, that her attack on Prasad and his resignation were "a coincidence", and that in general, "I just say what I say ... I'm not a puppet."

=== Business activities and financing ===
As of mid-November 2025, Loomer has approximately 1.5 million followers on Twitter social media platform, and earns "around" $150,000 a year from her show on the Rumble platform, according to what she told Antonia Hitchens. In addition to small denomination donations from online fans, she also receives funding from right-wing donor Robert J. Shillman, the founder of Cognex Corporation.

Her consulting firm, "Loomered Strategies" offers opposition research, and background checks ranging from "matrimonial due diligence" to ascertaining whether "a judge is corrupt". In the early days of her activism, Loomer sold concealed camera "sting" videos to The Gateway Pundit and Infowars.

== Conspiracy theories and misinformation ==
Loomer has falsely claimed that the Parkland high school shooting, and the Santa Fe High School shooting, were staged, and that Stephen Paddock, the perpetrator of the 2017 Las Vegas shooting, was affiliated with ISIS. She claimed on Twitter that crisis actors were used for the Santa Fe school shooting.

In July 2018, Loomer said that a man arrested in South Dakota with bomb-making equipment and illegal weapons had been a "leftist antifa terrorist". According to the man's social media activity at the time, and per his brother, he was a conservative who despised liberals and Antifa. During the October 2018 United States mail bombing attempts, Loomer claimed that the bombing attacks were a "false flag" operation orchestrated by Democrats.

After the 2022 Buffalo shooting, which was carried out by a white supremacist, Loomer claimed without evidence that the shooting was a hoax perpetrated by the Democratic Party in an attempt to start a race war. Loomer further suggested that the federal government was complicit in the shooting. Loomer also falsely suggested that the perpetrators of the Uvalde school shooting and the Highland Park parade shooting were inspired by the transgender rights movement.

In 2023, Loomer accused Casey DeSantis, wife of presidential candidate and Trump competitor Ron DeSantis, of exaggerating the seriousness of a bout of breast cancer to boost her husband's presidential campaign.

Following the 2023 Hamas-led attack on Israel, Loomer and other right-wing influencers amplified a false story claiming that October 13, 2023, was to be a global "day of jihad", a story that motivated a 71-year-old landlord in Illinois to stab a 6-year-old boy to death and attempt to murder his Muslim mother who were his tenants. After a fatal car crash in Long Beach on October 14, Loomer said that the crash was "Islamic terrorism", claiming that police had a gag order. Police later stated there was "no indication that this incident was an act of terror nor associated with the current violence in Israel".

In November 2023, Loomer was part of a study by the Atlantic Council, analyzed by Bloomberg, of Community Notes on Twitter regarding misinformation in the Gaza war. On October 12, she shared a video of a "pro-Hamas caravan" that had driven through London shouting racist abuse, implying the incident was recent. The video was, in fact, from May 2021, and police had made arrests after the incident. Loomer also tweeted false information about the 2023 Rainbow Bridge explosion in Buffalo, New York. She claimed the Federal Bureau of Investigation suspected a terrorist attack and that there may be a "Jihad plot" at the Macy's Thanksgiving Day Parade, despite the vehicle traveling on the U.S. side of the border towards Canada.

Loomer falsely said that a winter storm that occurred before the 2024 Iowa Republican presidential caucuses was created by the American deep state using High-frequency Active Auroral Research Program (HAARP) in order to benefit the electoral chances of presidential candidate Nikki Haley. In October 2024, in the aftermath of Hurricane Helene, Loomer amplified false claims of FEMA aid being denied entry into impacted areas in North Carolina. Loomer later urged individuals on Twitter not to accept help from FEMA.

In 2023 and 2024, Loomer falsely attributed social media posts to family members of judges Arthur Engoron and Juan Merchan, who were overseeing court cases involving Donald Trump. Loomer inaccurately claimed these family members had called for Trump's imprisonment on social media. Loomer's misinformation was amplified by Trump to support his claims that Engoron and Merchan were biased against him. Loomer further falsely claimed that Merchan's daughter was receiving checks from congressional Democrats, a claim shared by Representative Elise Stefanik.

In July 2024, Loomer falsely claimed on Twitter that "Joe Biden is dying and final preparations are being made for him."

In September 2024, Loomer promoted the Springfield, Ohio, cat-eating hoax, lying that the city is populated by "20,000 cannibalistic Haitians".

Loomer claimed that the United States Agency for International Development (USAID) funded the salaries of CNN and MSNBC TV show hosts.

Following the 2025 shootings of Minnesota legislators, Loomer falsely accused Minnesota Governor Tim Walz of being responsible for the shootings, saying that "Walz's goons are now assassinating lawmakers who support legislation Walz opposes." Loomer further called the Democratic Party a "terrorist organization." Walz was included on a list of potential targets compiled by Vance Boelter, the actual shooter. After the 2025 Midtown Manhattan shooting, Loomer falsely claimed that "The cop killer in NYC who just killed an NYPD officer was a supporter of [mayoral candidate] Zohran Mamdani." Loomer further said that "@ZohranKMamdani is inspiring a generation of pro-Islamic cop killers. This is why you don't elect Muslim immigrants to office." The police officer killed in the shooting, Didarul Islam, was a Muslim immigrant from Bangladesh.

Loomer criticized Donald Trump's administration on October 10, 2025, and falsely claimed that the Pentagon was giving Qatar a military base in the United States. She wrote on Twitter "Never thought I'd see Republicans give terror financing Muslims from Qatar a MILITARY BASE on US soil so they can murder Americans". United States Secretary of Defense Pete Hegseth denied that Qatar will have a base in the United States after her false claim.

Loomer claimed, without evidence, that the 2025 Brown University shooting was an act of "Islamic terrorism." Loomer spread a theory misidentifying a pro-Palestinian Brown University undergraduate student as the shooter and sharing their name on social media. A different individual, Claudio Neves Valente, was subsequently identified as the shooter, with no evidence indicating the suspect had jihadist motives.

Following the killing of Rob and Michele Reiner, Loomer shared a fake post falsely attributed to Rob Reiner that used profanity to disparage supporters of Donald Trump. Loomer called Reiner a "loser" and said "Reiner should have spent more time parenting and less time spreading Russia conspiracy hoaxes about President Trump."

In February 2026, Loomer falsely claimed that drug lord Nemesio Oseguera Cervantes of the Jalisco New Generation Cartel had been "eliminated" by the United States. The Mexican Embassy in the United States rejected Loomer's claims and stated that Oseguera had been killed by the Mexican Special Forces, not by the U.S.

During the 2026 Iran War, Loomer falsely claimed that an Iranian exile living in the United States was the niece of deceased Iranian general Qasem Soleimani, a leading figure in the Iranian government. Marco Rubio subsequently announced that the woman and her daughter had been arrested and placed in immigration detention because of their alleged relation to the general and their supposed promotion of pro-Iranian propaganda. Drop Site News confirmed that not only was the person in question not Qasem Soleimani's niece, but that she had fled Iran for the United States in order to escape government persecution. In response to Drop Site's reporting, Loomer said "I want all Islamic immigrants deported. I don't support any of their asylum claims."

In October 2026, a federal judge found that former Secretary of Homeland Security Kristi Noem and her aide, Corey Lewandowski, had given Loomer false information about ex-FEMA chief financial officer Mary Comans. Based on Noem's tip, Loomer falsely accused Comans of directing tens of millions of dollars in federal funds to hotel accomodations for migrants. The judge said that "Armed only with false statements, high-ranking government officials undertook a premeditated campaign to impugn the personal and professional integrity of Ms. Comans, a nonpartisan, career public servant. Their intent was to disseminate false and derogatory information about Ms. Comans as widely as possible."

== Campaigns for public office ==
=== 2020 ===
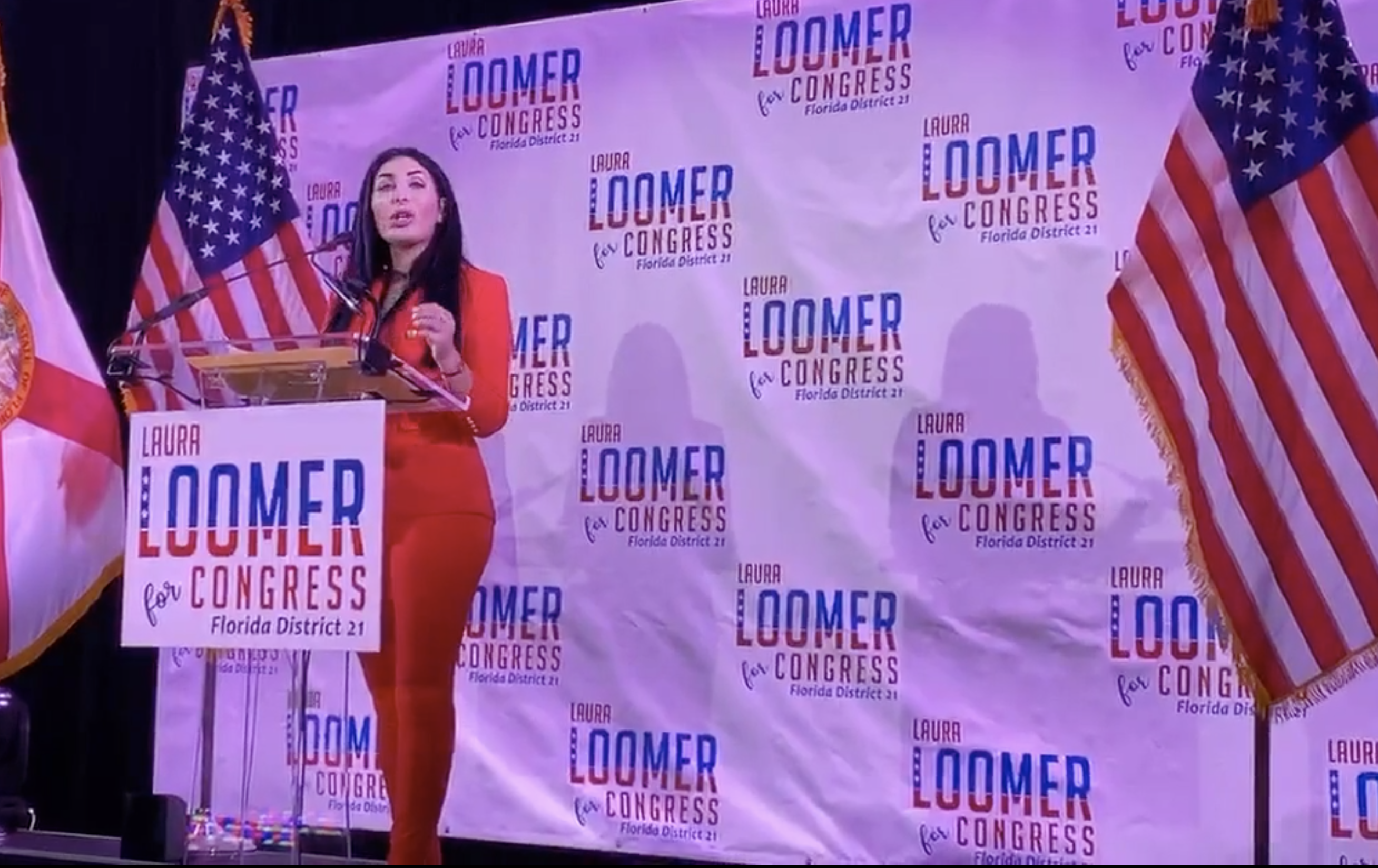
Loomer during her election campaign

Loomer lost the 2020 United States House of Representatives election in Florida's 21st congressional district to incumbent Democrat Lois Frankel. The district was heavily Democratic, and Loomer's candidacy was considered a long shot. Frankel had represented the district since 2012. Loomer defeated five opponents to win the Republican primary in August 2020, receiving 14,500 votes out of 34,000 cast (43%). President Donald Trump expressed support for Loomer, tweeting after her primary win, "Great going Laura. You have a great chance against a Pelosi puppet!" She also received endorsements from Florida Representative Matt Gaetz and Trump adviser Roger Stone. The White House later downplayed Trump's support for Loomer and for Congressional candidate Marjorie Taylor Greene, saying, "The president routinely congratulates people who officially get the Republican nomination for Congress, so he does that as a matter of course ... He hasn't done a deep dive into the statements by these two particular women." After her primary victory, Twitter and Facebook reiterated that they would not unban her.

Republican primary results, 2020
Party	Candidate	Votes	%
Republican	Laura Loomer	14,526	42.5
Republican	Christian Acosta	8,724	25.5
Republican	Michael Vilardi	4,194	12.3
Republican	Aaron Scanlan	3,221	9.4
Republican	Elizabeth Felton	2,421	7.1
Republican	Reba Sherrill	1,070	3.1
Total votes		34,156	100.0

Florida's 21st congressional district, 2020
Party	Candidate	Votes	%
Democratic	Lois Frankel (incumbent)	237,925	59.02%
Republican	Laura Loomer	157,612	39.10%
Independent	Charleston Malkemus	7,544	1.87%
Independent	Sylvia Caravetta (write-in)	8	0.01%
Independent Republican	Piotr Blass (write-in)	4	0.01%
Total votes		403,093	100.0
Democratic hold			

=== 2022 ===
In September 2021, Loomer announced her candidacy for Florida's 11th district in 2022. She tried to unseat Republican Rep. Daniel Webster in the primary election. Loomer had initially declared her intent to run again in the 21st district. Backed by the group American Liberty Fund, Loomer was endorsed by Representatives Marjorie Taylor Greene and Paul Gosar, as well as Roger Stone and Michael Flynn. She lost the primary election on August 23, 2022, with 44.2% to Webster's 51.1%, but refused to concede. In an election night speech Loomer said "I'm not conceding because I'm a winner, the reality is our Republican party is broken to its core." Loomer railed against unspecified voter fraud and "big-tech election interference".

Republican primary results
Party	Candidate	Votes	%
Republican	Daniel Webster (incumbent)	43,471	51.1
Republican	Laura Loomer	37,612	44.2
Republican	Gavriel Soriano	4,070	4.8
Total votes		85,153	100.0

== Bans and removals ==
Loomer has been banned by numerous providers, services, and events. In 2021 she published a book, Loomered: How I became the most banned woman in the world, describing these experiences.

=== From apps and online platforms ===
Blogging platform Medium banned Loomer in February 2017 after expanding its platform policies to ban posting disinformation and expanding its policies against hate speech. Loomer was banned from both Uber and Lyft in November 2017 after a day-long anti-Muslim tweetstorm, which included tweets about not being able to find a "non Muslim [sic] cab or @Uber @lyft driver". Twitter banned Loomer in November 2018 for violating its policies against hateful conduct. After the ban, she handcuffed herself to Twitter's headquarters in New York for two hours before police cut through the handcuffs at her request. In February 2019, Loomer was banned from PayPal, GoFundMe, and Venmo. In response, she said that "left wing terrorists and tech tyrants" were "trying to shut [her] down" and that she would "stop at nothing to make sure justice is served for the way Silicon Valley has disenfranchised me, falsely accusing me of being a white supremacist, a Nazi, anti-Muslim, a racist, a bigot, and every other smear in the book." Loomer was one of several right-wing activists banned by Facebook and Instagram in 2019 for using the platforms to post misinformation and extremism. In May 2021, she said she was banned from the social media app Clubhouse hours after joining.

In December 2022, after Elon Musk bought Twitter, Loomer's previously banned Twitter account was reinstated.

=== From events ===
Loomer used press credentials to attend the March 2018 trial of Noor Salman, the wife of the perpetrator of the June 2016 Orlando nightclub shooting. Her credentials were revoked after she harassed Salman's family; when she returned to the trial the next day, she was removed by a U.S. Marshal. In April 2018, Loomer disrupted an event promoting James Comey's book A Higher Loyalty before being removed from the building by security. In September 2018, she briefly interrupted a House Energy and Commerce Committee hearing. Shouting from the visitor gallery, she accused Twitter CEO Jack Dorsey, who was testifying before the committee, of censoring conservatives on the platform and of attempting to influence elections in favor of Democrats. Republican representative Billy Long began a mock auction chant, pretending he was selling Loomer's mobile phone, until she was escorted out. The incident generated considerable laughter and applause from the audience. In October 2018, police escorted Loomer from a campaign event for Andrew Gillum, the Democratic nominee for governor of Florida.

Loomer was banned from the 2019 Conservative Political Action Conference (CPAC) after aggressively confronting reporters, using her press credentials to follow them into a media-only area after they had declined to speak with her. In particular, she heckled CNN reporter Oliver Darcy with questions about internet censorship and social media bans.

In 2021, Loomer again confronted Dorsey at the Bitcoin 2021 conference, alleging he had censored people and interfered with elections; she was removed from the event.

== Lawsuits ==
In 2018, after Loomer was banned by various social media companies, she sued Twitter, Apple, Facebook, and Google. The lawsuit, in which she was represented by right-wing activist lawyer Larry Klayman, alleged that the platforms had collaborated to suppress conservative speech. The district court dismissed the case, and the U.S. Court of Appeals upheld the dismissal; the courts held that social media companies could not violate the First Amendment because they are not governmental bodies. In 2021, the Supreme Court of the United States denied Loomer's petition to hear the case.

After Twitter banned Loomer in 2018, she and her company, Illoominate Media, sued the Council on American–Islamic Relations (CAIR), claiming it had conspired with Twitter to ban her. The lawsuit was thrown out after Nathan Bernard, known for pranking prominent alt-right personalities, admitted he had fabricated the rumor that CAIR was behind the ban. In 2020, Loomer lost an appeal of the case, with the U.S. Court of Appeals for the 11th Circuit ruling that "Loomer and Illoominate offer nothing beyond vague speculation to indicate that CAIR-Florida was involved in the alleged conspiracy". In 2021, a U.S. magistrate judge ordered Loomer to reimburse more than $120,000 in attorney's fees to CAIR.

In 2019, Loomer filed an unsuccessful lawsuit against U.S. Representative Rashida Tlaib, alleging that during the disruption of an August 2018 campaign event by Loomer and others, Tlaib "violently grabbed" Loomer's cellphone while Loomer was questioning her about foreign policy. The Minneapolis Star Tribune reported that the "video of the incident includes audio of Loomer asking Tlaib if she was 'willing to admit ... that Hamas is a terrorist organization.'"

In 2022, Loomer again sued Facebook and Twitter, alleging their anti-hate speech policies constitute racketeering. This suit was also dismissed, on grounds of both res judicata and Section 230. The dismissal was upheld on appeal in 2025 and the Supreme Court declined to hear Loomer's further appeal.

In 2024, Loomer sued Bill Maher and HBO for defamation after Maher suggested that she and Trump were having an extramarital affair. A federal judge dismissed the lawsuit in April 2026.

== Views ==
Loomer has been described by various sources as far-right, a white nationalist (including by herself), as well as alt-right, (Note: Sources describing Loomer as "alt-right" include: Grove, Lloyd (July 6, 2017). "High Anxiety at CNN Amid Attacks From Trump and His Trolls". The Daily Beast.; Feldman, Ari (July 10, 2017). "Jewish 'Alt-Right' Woman Takes On Richard Spencer Amid Infighting". The Forward.; Kircher, Madison Malone (November 15, 2017). "Twitter Is Un-Verifying Alt-Right Accounts". New York.; Nwanevu, Osita (July 2, 2018). "Why Did the Rhode Island Democratic Party Endorse an Alt-Right Supporter Over a Progressive Incumbent?". Slate.; Watson, Kathryn (September 5, 2018). "Congressman drowns out protester with auction call in Twitter hearing". CBS News.) and alt-lite, (Note: Sources describing Loomer as "alt-light" include: Feldman, Ari (July 14, 2017). "Laura Loomer Is The Jewish Voice Of The Far Right. Can She Tame Jew Haters?". The Forward. Archived from the original on July 18, 2018.; Krupkin, Taly (June 22, 2017). "The Jewish Provocateur Caught in the Turf War as the 'Alt-right' Battles the 'Alt-light'". Haaretz. Archived from the original on October 11, 2020.; Marantz, Andrew (July 6, 2017). "The Alt-Right Branding War Has Torn the Movement in Two". The New Yorker. Archived from the original on August 31, 2018.) and has described herself as a proud Islamophobe. Cultural critic James Wolcott called her a "raging zealot ... intent on becoming the agent provocateur". Loomer has denounced the alt-right and publicly repudiated white supremacist Richard B. Spencer (who coined the term) and refused to share a stage with him. In 2017, a tweet by Spencer referenced a number of associated individuals, classifying them as the "alt-lite". This included Loomer, who he characterized as a "Zionist fanatic." However, Loomer has indicated she supports white nationalism, claiming it is distinct from white supremacy and that white nationalists "need effective leaders—people who aren't Richard Spencer, people who aren't James Allsup—to effectively convey that message."

Donald Trump, who The New York Times reported wanted to hire Loomer for a campaign role, has described her as "very opinionated", while U.S. representative Marjorie Taylor Greene has claimed she is "mentally unstable and a documented liar", despite previously endorsing Loomer in her 2022 Florida midterm race. Loomer and Greene have shared heated arguments online, with Loomer claiming Greene is "no longer an ally to America First", as well as questioning her Christianity, loyalty to Trump, and lack of criticism of rival presidential candidate Ron DeSantis.

Trump's aides are said to have concerns over Loomer's inflammatory statements and support for the Republican Party's fringes. Loomer considers herself a "Trump loyalist" and has described DeSantis as a tyrant, personally attacking him online. Loomer also found an ally in Donald Trump Jr., who said, "I'd love to see her as press secretary just to watch D.C. just explode" in November 2023.

=== Islamophobia ===
Loomer has repeatedly espoused anti-Muslim views. On November 1, 2017, the day after a terrorist attack in New York City, Loomer tweeted that she was late to a conference because she could not find a "non Muslim [sic] cab or @Uber @lyft driver". After it became known that the suspect in the attack was a former driver for Uber, she called for the creation of a new ride-sharing company that would not employ Muslims. Her day-long tweetstorm blamed all Muslims for the activities of radical Islamists such as ISIS. Subsequently, both Uber and Lyft announced that she had violated their guidelines and was banned from using their services. She described herself on Twitter at the time as a "#ProudIslamophobe" and called for a complete and permanent ban on Muslims entering the United States.

In August 2018, Loomer disrupted a congressional campaign event for Minnesota Democrat Ilhan Omar, which Rashida Tlaib attended (a few months later, Omar and Tlaib became the first Muslim women elected to Congress). Loomer shouted questions that implied that Tlaib was antisemitic. In November of that year, Twitter banned Loomer from its platform for violating its rules against hateful behavior. According to Loomer, she was banned for a tweet about Omar in which Loomer called her "anti-Jewish," and a member of a religion in which "homosexuals are oppressed," and women are "abused" and "forced to wear the hijab". A week after the ban, she handcuffed herself to a door at Twitter's New York City headquarters in protest while wearing a yellow "Jude" patch. After approximately two hours, police removed the handcuffs with a bolt cutter at her request. Loomer was not arrested.

In February 2019, Loomer traveled to Minnesota with Jacob Wohl, a right-wing perpetrator of Internet fraud, and Ali Alexander, a far-right activist. The group said they were "investigating" whether Omar had married her brother so that he could obtain U.S. citizenship, a baseless rumor that had circulated in Minnesota politics since 2016. Wohl, Loomer, and Alexander were unable to find any immigration irregularities by Omar. A few weeks later, in March 2019, Wohl and Loomer were ejected from the 2019 CPAC when they attempted to present evidence from their trip to Minnesota. Loomer had previously accosted Omar with the same unsubstantiated allegations at the August 2018 Omar campaign event, the one attended by Tlaib. In 2019, Loomer uploaded a video to Instagram about Omar, blaming her and all Muslims for the September 11 attacks and asserting that "Muslims should not even be allowed to seek positions of political office in this country."

Right Wing Watch reported in February 2019 that donations solicited by Loomer were going to the address of the United West, an organization the Southern Poverty Law Center lists as an anti-Muslim hate group. At that time, PayPal banned Loomer from any further use of their service. The Council on American–Islamic Relations, a Muslim advocacy and civil rights organization, has described the United West as Islamophobic.

In 2019, following the Christchurch mosque shootings that killed 51 Muslim worshippers in New Zealand, Loomer wrote on the platform Telegram: "Nobody cares about Christchurch. I especially don't." Loomer has described Islam as "cancer" and Muslims as "savages."

Following strikes on Iranian nuclear sites conducted by the United States during the Twelve Day War, Loomer called for Americans in cities with large Muslim populations to arm themselves against potential terror attacks. After Congresswoman Yassamin Ansari criticized Loomer for hate speech, Loomer replied to Ansari, saying "There's no such thing as Hate Speech, Muslima. You are a Muslim who came from Iran." Ansari is an agnostic born to Iranian-American parents in Seattle.

After Zohran Mamdani won the 2025 New York City Democratic mayoral primary, Loomer attacked Mamdani over his Muslim beliefs, saying that "There will be another 9/11 in NYC and Zohran Mamdani will be to blame." She further predicted that New York City "will be destroyed" and that Muslims would be "committing jihad all over New York." Loomer also accused Mamdani of having ties to the Muslim Brotherhood and suggested that the Trump administration could criminally charge him, falsely accusing Mamdani of terrorism. (Note: Sources of Loomer racism towards NYC mayoral candidate, Zohran Mamdani: Markus, Nicole (June 25, 2025). "MAGA right attacks Zohran Mamdani's religion following his win". Politico.; McCan Ramirez, Nikki (June 26, 2025). "Laura Loomer Demands Trump Charge Mamdani Over Made-Up Terrorism Claim". Rolling Stone.; Gedeon, Joseph (June 25, 2025). "Mamdani faces barrage of Islamophobic attacks after New York primary success". The Guardian US.) In 2025, Loomer asked Representatives Randy Fine and Andy Ogles about banning Muslims from running for public office.

After a mass shooting was perpetrated against the Islamic Center of San Diego in May 2026, Loomer posted a series of controversial posts downplaying the attacks, including doubting the shooting's legitimacy, falsely claiming that the mosque attendants "want us all to be killed", and calling for the Islamic Center to be raided by ICE and the FBI. Loomer said the victims were undeserving of sympathy and called for the deportation of "every Muslim in America."

In May 2026, Loomer said "Maybe we need another 9/11" in order to stop Muslims from being "involved in our political process in America."

=== White nationalism ===
Loomer has described herself as "pro-white nationalism", stating her belief that "liberals and left-wing globalist Marxist Jews" don't understand "a difference between white nationalism and white supremacy". Loomer has described her belief that "this country really was built as the white Judeo-Christian ethnostate" and that "immigration and all these calls for diversity, it's starting to destroy this country." Loomer called into an InfoWars interview with Kanye West to express her support for West's right to free speech, declaring herself "sympathetic" to West. Earlier in the interview, West had praised Adolf Hitler and the Nazi Party. In response to Loomer's defense of him, West told Loomer, "[I] love you." In 2022, Loomer spoke at the annual conference of white supremacist publication American Renaissance. During this speech, Loomer referred to herself as a "white advocate" and called for a ten-year moratorium on immigration. Loomer has praised American Renaissance founder Jared Taylor and says she opposes "anti-white racism and anti-white hatred". She has additionally attended events with white supremacist Nick Fuentes, and has spoken at Fuentes' white nationalist gathering America First Political Action Conference. Fuentes supported Loomer's congressional candidacy, during which Loomer and Fuentes shared a toast calling for "the hostile takeover of the Republican Party." However, Loomer later broke with Fuentes after he accused her of being an Israeli spy and told his followers not to vote for Donald Trump. Loomer has accepted support from white supremacist Peter Brimelow, founder of the website VDARE, an anti-immigration site associated with white supremacy, white nationalism, and the alt-right.

In 2017, Loomer claimed to be dating alt-right activist Tim Gionet, who had tweeted a photoshopped picture of Loomer being executed inside a gas chamber, referencing the killing of Jews during the Holocaust. Gionet denied that the pair were dating. Loomer has also expressed support for Christian nationalism. In an interview, Loomer said, in reference to birthright citizenship "I think you can only serve in office if you were actually born in this country. Not a birthright citizen anchor baby like Nikki Haley, but I don't want people like that in our country let alone in our congress."

Loomer has described herself as a nationalist and stated that immigrants who refuse to assimilate are a threat to American heritage. In response to a news story about the drowning of 2,000 migrants in the Mediterranean Sea, Loomer expressed her approval of the migrant deaths, tweeting, "Good. Here's to 2,000 more." According to Media Matters, Loomer has endorsed the white nationalist Great Replacement theory, accusing the Hebrew Immigrant Aid Society of "facilitating the invasion of America", and has stated that "so many rich Jews have a fixation on trying to destroy America." Asked in 2017 by Haaretz about her views as a Jew participating in an "anti-sharia" event where the neo-Nazi group Identity Evropa was visibly present, Loomer replied, "Oh, this is like an identitarian group. I'm not totally familiar, but I know they believe in preserving white European culture; there is nothing wrong with that, and they are nationalist." Loomer called for the Anti-Defamation League, a Jewish civil rights organization, to be designated a domestic terrorist organization, in response to the ADL cataloguing the Christian Identity movement, a white supremacist and antisemitic religious ideology, as extremist.

In July 2025, Loomer praised the opening of Alligator Alcatraz, an immigration detention facility in Florida, tweeting "Feeding illegals to the gators. We need more of this energy." Loomer further tweeted that the alligators surrounding the detention center were "guaranteed at least 65 million meals," an apparent reference to the entire Latino population of the United States, which was around 65 million in 2025.

=== Anti-Black racism ===
Separate from Loomer's belief in white nationalism, she has made a number of public remarks, with regards to black individuals and the black community in the United States that have been characterized as racist. Most prominently, she has referred to the black elected officials of the Democratic party, Kamala Harris, Fani Willis, and Letitia James as "DEI Shaniquas". Loomer also separately referred to Jasmine Crockett as a "GHETTO DEI Shaniqua." The name Shaniqua is a mocking or stereotypical name for black women, associated with inner cities, due to its popularity in the US during the 1970s and 1980s. During a Spaces event on X in June 2024, Loomer described an event hosted by Fulton County district attorney Fani Willis as "smell[ing] like fried chicken and marijuana − it was gross. Stereotypes exist for a reason, that's all I'll say".

Loomer has referred to Ilhan Omar, who is Somali-American, as a "black dog" whose "district is literally Somalia." Loomer falsely claimed that Omar's relatives "sleep in caves and have sex with goats." Loomer said that Somalis are "so inbred that they have an IQ that is legally classified as mental retardation."

After the death of U.S. Representative Sheila Jackson Lee in 2024, Loomer called Jackson Lee a "ghetto bitch" and "one of the most low IQ members of Congress". Loomer also referred to Jasmine Crockett as a "ghetto black bitch who hate[s] America" and said that Crockett "should be working at KFC." On April 20, 2026, Loomer called Candace Owens a "nappy-headed Black Bitch." In August 2026, Loomer posted that Ketanji Brown Jackson, Ayanna Pressley and Ilhan Omar were "ghetto, entitled, race-obsessed, destructive black BITCHES who are completely unfit for the power they hold." Loomer also wrote that U.S. senate candidate Angie Nixon of Florida "is a ghetto, Black, communist...I called you a ghetto bitch, because you are, Angie, and your record proves it. But you speak Ebonics though, so maybe I need to bark at you and tug your leash and then you'll finally understand."

=== Russo-Ukrainian war ===
Loomer previously held anti-Ukrainian views, blaming Ukraine for starting the Russo-Ukrainian war while criticizing American support for Ukraine's defense from Russian invasion. She had also declared Ukraine "a country full of Nazi apologists" and "led by a Jihadi apologist", echoing Russian talking points. Loomer attributed these beliefs to her ban from several social media platforms that relegated her online presence to apps like Telegram, where pro-Russia accounts are prevalent, and relying on news coverage from the Russian state media RT; she also contributed stories to RT.

By July 2026, however, her stance had reversed. She advocated for the Trump administration to "be pro-Ukraine in this fight" and provide military aid, especially in response to ties between Russia and Iran. Loomer also expressed regret for her previous statements, having realized she had "consumed a lot of content that was clearly propaganda". This view put her at odds with other American conservatives who supported Russia, whom she alleges are paid by the Russian government.

Loomer visited Ukraine in late July 2026, where she experienced an air raid in Kyiv. She also interviewed Zelenskyy on Rumble, and criticized Russia for striking the Dormition Cathedral in Kyiv.

=== COVID-19 ===
Loomer downplayed the severity of COVID-19, writing in December 2020, "I hope I get COVID just so I can prove to people I've had bouts of food poisoning that are more serious and life-threatening than a hyped-up virus". In September 2021, she said she had become ill with the virus and was battling it with a variety of preparations, including some shown to be ineffective. She announced via Telegram that she was in great pain and requested that people pray for her. Loomer maintained that COVID-19 vaccines are "unsafe and ineffective" and said that she would refuse to get one in the future.

=== Democrats ===
According to Media Matters, Loomer has said that "if you don't vote for Donald Trump, then you just hate this country." Loomer claims that the Democratic Party is supportive of Jews "getting wiped off the face of the Earth" and that Jews who vote for Democrats "might as well just go put yourself in a gas chamber yourself if this is how you're gonna behave." Responding to interviewer Tim Pool's suggestion that Donald Trump make lists of Democrats who should be put in jail, Loomer said that Trump should have these Democrats executed for treason.

=== Catholicism ===
Loomer disapproved of the selection of Pope Leo XIV, who she described as "Just another Marxist puppet in the Vatican" and "anti-Trump, anti-Maga, pro-open Borders, and a total Marxist like Pope Francis". After the United States Conference of Catholic Bishops condemned Trump's deportation policies, Loomer again attacked the Pope as "Marxist" and said "It's sad to see the Catholic Church work so hard to try to destroy our country."

== Personal life ==
Loomer became engaged to her boyfriend in 2025. Her engagement was publicly announced by Donald Trump at the White House Christmas party in December 2025, as Trump introduced Loomer to party guests.

Loomer is Jewish.
