= Rebel News =

Canadian political and social commentary media website

- Screenshot
- Website type: Politics
- Available in: English and French
- Headquarters: Calgary, Alberta
- Owner: Ezra Levant
- Founders: Ezra Levant, Brian Lilley
- CEO: Ezra Levant
- Key people: Lawrence Solomon, Raheel Raza (Advisory Board)
- Website: RebelNews.com
- Commercial: Yes
- Registration: Optional
- Launched: 16 February 2015; 11 years ago
- Current status: Active

Rebel News (also known as The Rebel Media and The Rebel) is a Canadian far-right political and social commentary media website operated by Rebel News Network Ltd. It has been described as a "global platform" for the anti-Muslim ideology known as counter-jihad. It was founded in February 2015 by former Sun News Network personalities Ezra Levant and Brian Lilley.

Rebel News broadcasts its content only on the internet and has been compared to Breitbart News in the US. Rebel News has been described as being part of the alt-right movement.

Former Sun News reporter Faith Goldy joined Rebel News after its launch, but was fired for her coverage of the 2017 Charlottesville rally and for conducting an interview with The Daily Stormer. A co-founder and two freelancers resigned in protest of the coverage. Gavin McInnes, founder of the far-right neo-fascist organization Proud Boys, was a contributor. McInnes departed in 2017, then temporarily rejoined the site for a period in 2019. In the midst of the 2021 Canadian federal election, Justin Trudeau accused Rebel News of spreading misinformation, especially with regard to COVID-19 vaccines. Rebel News has promoted climate change denial.

== History ==
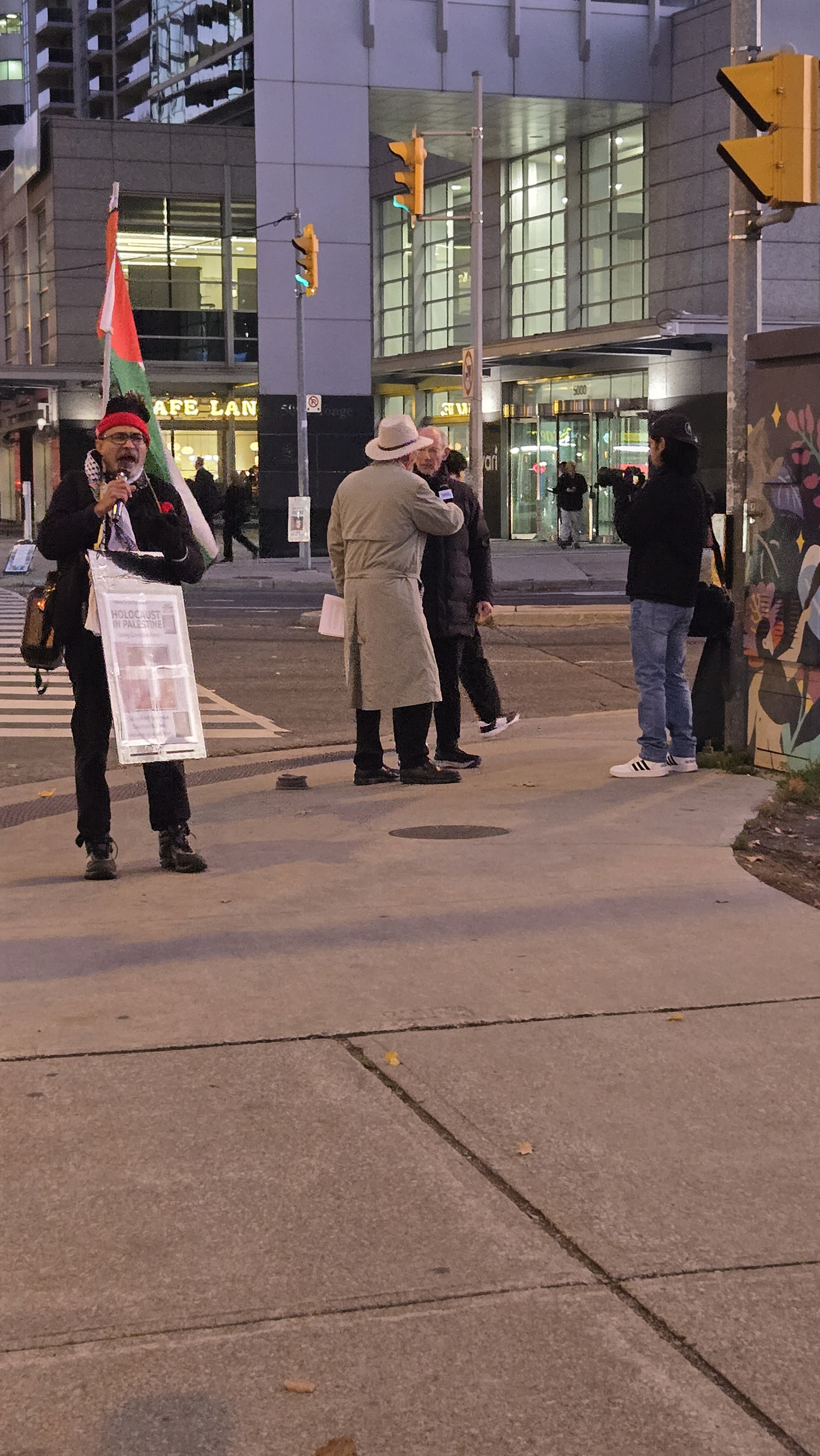
Rebel News reporter David "The Menzoid" Menzies (middle, in the hat and trench coat) in Toronto, 2024

Prior to the official opening of the media franchise operation as a corporation, it operated for a number of years as an individual effort by Levant, who styled himself "The Rebel." At least one of his ideas, to fight "anti-Christian bigots on Nanaimo city council," attracted support from university student and now Member of Parliament Dane Lloyd.

=== 2015–2017 ===
Former logo (until September 2019)

The Rebel Media was formed by Levant and Lilley following the closure of the Sun News Network. Levant said that his online production would be unencumbered by the regulatory and distribution difficulties faced by Sun News Network and that its lower production costs would make it more viable. Levant has cited Breitbart News, the American far-right news website, as an inspiration. A crowdfunding campaign raised roughly CA$100,000 for the project. The site soon attracted a number of other former Sun News Network personalities such as David Menzies, Paige MacPherson, Faith Goldy, Patrick Moore and, briefly, Michael Coren.

In the summer of 2015, the channel, led by Levant, launched a campaign to boycott Tim Hortons, a chain of Canadian coffee shops, after it rejected in-store ads from Enbridge due to complaints from customers opposed to the oil pipeline projects being promoted by the ads.

In early 2016, the Alberta government banned The Rebel Media's correspondents from press briefings on the grounds that, because Ezra Levant had testified in court in 2014 that he was a columnist or commentator rather than a reporter, none of his current correspondents could be considered to be journalists. On 17 February 2016, the government admitted that it made a mistake and said that it would allow The Rebel Media correspondents into press briefings. The Canadian Association of Journalists supported preventing government from choosing journalism coverage."

In late 2016, after first being refused press accreditation for the United Nations Framework Convention on Climate Change (UNFCC) COP22 Climate Change Conference, Rebel Media was allowed to send two correspondents to COP22. Levant wrote that "We're not being excluded because we have an opinion. We're being excluded because we have the wrong opinion." Rebel Media received support from the Environment Minister Catherine McKenna and three journalism organizations in getting the UNFCC to grant this access, after Levant's October 17 appeal to Justin Trudeau.

Following the Quebec City mosque shooting of 2017, Rebel Media and Levant in particular were harshly criticized in the National Observer for their reporting and pursuing "a narrative about violence by immigrants," though the shooting was committed by the far-right Alexandre Bissonnette. Kai Nagata noted "Levant and Goldy were both speakers at a rally in Toronto last week organized by The Rebel to protest a motion by Liberal MP Iqra Khalid, which calls on the government to condemn Islamophobia'" in response to the shooting.

In 2017, Rebel Media hired far-right activist Tommy Robinson, founder of the avowedly anti-Islamic English Defence League, as its British correspondent.

In March 2017, one of their correspondents, Gavin McInnes, made controversial comments defending Holocaust deniers, accused the Jews of being responsible for the Holodomor and the Treaty of Versailles, and said he was "becoming anti-Semitic". He later said his comments were taken out of context. McInnes also produced a satirical video for Rebel called "Ten Things I Hate about Jews", later retitled "Ten Things I Hate About Israel". Rebel also hosted a video by McInnes in which he encouraged viewers to brawl against antifa as his group the Proud Boys did, saying, "When they go low, go lower."

During the 2017 French Presidential Election, Jack Posobiec, The Rebel Media's Washington, D.C. bureau chief, supported far-right leader Marine Le Pen and played a role in the 2017 Macron e-mail leaks.

=== Coverage of Unite the Right Rally ===
On 12 August 2017, Rebel correspondent Faith Goldy reported from the Unite the Right Rally in Charlottesville, Virginia. Broadcasting on livestream, she gained clear footage of a fatal car attack by a white supremacist against left-wing protestors. Interviewed about the rally and the clip by Israel's Channel 2 News, Goldy opined that, "there is a "culture war" happening between the hard left and hard right and that "many on both sides see this as a civil war – you know the fascists vs. the communists."

On Monday August 14, Rebel founder Ezra Levant denounced the element of the "alt-right" which had participated in the rally, stating that it "now effectively means racism, anti-Semitism and tolerance of neo-Nazism." The same day Brian Lilley announced his departure from Rebel News, writing, "What anyone from The Rebel was doing at a so-called 'unite the right' rally that was really an anti-Semitic white power rally is beyond me. Especially not a rally dedicated to keeping up a statue of Robert E. Lee, a man that whatever else he stood for, also fought on the wrong side of history and the wrong side of America's bloodiest conflict." Lilley said he had become uncomfortable with what he felt was an "increasingly harsh tone" when The Rebel discussed topics such as immigration or Islam. He accused The Rebel of exhibiting a "lack of editorial and behavioural judgment that, [if] left unchecked, will destroy it and those around it."

Less than a week after the rally, on August 17 Levant fired Goldy from Rebel News when it had emerged that she'd joined a podcast produced by The Daily Stormer in which she appeared to support the rally's right-wing participants. In the course of reporting on the Unite the Right rally, Goldy argued that they suggested a wider "rising white racial consciousness" in America and characterizing a manifesto by white supremacist Richard Spencer that called for organizing states along racial lines as "robust" and "well thought-out."

Freelancers Barbara Kay and John Robson also quit the Rebel, and the company was denounced by Conservative MPs Michael Chong, Chris Alexander, Peter Kent, and Lisa Raitt. Former interim leader Rona Ambrose had previously disavowed the site.

Brian Jean, Jason Kenney, and Doug Schweitzer of the United Conservative Party of Alberta expressed dissatisfaction with the Rebel's editorial direction over the preceding months and said they would not grant interviews to the company. Jean dropped his boycott of the Rebel in August 2022 and agreed to an interview about his leadership campaign for the United Conservative Party.

Gavin McInnes left the Rebel at the end of August 2017. Levant wrote "We tried to keep him, but he was lured away by a major competitor that we just couldn't outbid" in an email to the independent news site Canadaland. In February 2019, after suing the Southern Poverty Law Center for allegedly damaging his reputation and career prospect by characterizing the Proud Boys as a hate group, McInnes announced that he had once again been hired by the media group.

British contributor Caolan Robertson no longer works for the Rebel. Robertson claims he was fired for "knowing too much" about the Rebel's finances, claiming the company dishonestly solicited donations for projects that were already funded and concealing how that money was spent. He also claimed that Southern was fired for refusing to tape a fundraising appeal for the Rebel's Israel trip after fundraising targets had already been met. Robertson also played audio of Levant offering him thousands of dollars of what Levant himself called "hush money." Levant denies these allegations and says he will present evidence opposing this in court, claiming that he was being "blackmailed" by Robertson and his partner. Levant has since briefly talked about The Rebel's finances in his online show and released a summary on The Rebel's website. It was reported that the settlement was negotiated by Kory Teneycke, who was formerly director of communication for Canadian Prime Minister Stephen Harper.

=== Hamish Marshall and Andrew Scheer ===
During the 2017 Conservative Party leadership race, many contenders, including the eventual leadership winner Andrew Scheer, gave interviews to the outlet.

After the 2017 Conservative Party leadership race, it was revealed that Scheer's campaign manager Hamish Marshall's IT firm Torch provided IT services to The Rebel Media. In 2015, Marshall told the National Observer that he was only involved in the business side of the Rebel. Marshall explained to that he had left the Rebel after the leadership race ended to avoid a conflict of interest. In September 2017, Marshall's name was removed from the list of directors of The Rebel Media on the federal government's online registry of corporate information. On 16 October 2017, The Globe and Mail asked Scheer if he knew that Hamish Marshall shared office space with the Rebel during the leadership campaign. Scheer replied that he did not ask Marshall about his firm's many clients. Later, a spokesperson clarified that Scheer did not know the specifics of the arrangement. Levant explained that Marshall's IT firm Torch provided client services for the Rebel. A 2017 National Post article argued that Marshall implemented the Rebel donation system. Scheer told Maclean's in 2018 that Marshall's past relationship with the Rebel should not be conflated with his selection as campaign chair.

Scheer denounced the outlet due to its coverage of the Unite the Right rally, and stated that he would stop doing interviews with The Rebel Media until its "editorial directions" changed. A day later, Scheer stated that he would not be granting interviews with the Rebel going forward, in an interview with the National Post.

On September 30, 2019, two police forces escorted Rebel Media correspondent David Menzies away from a Scheer campaign announcement.

=== Advertiser boycott ===
Beginning in May 2017, the Rebel was the target of a boycott campaign by the social media activist group Sleeping Giants whereby advertisers were pressured to withdraw their adverts from The Rebel Media's YouTube channel and website. Within a three-month period in 2017, the activist group claimed that the Rebel had lost approximately 300 advertisers, including CCM Hockey, Mountain Equipment Co-op, Red Lobster, Reitmans, Penguin Books Canada, Volkswagen Canada and Tangerine Bank, along with PetSmart, the Hudson's Bay Company, General Motors Canada, the Royal Canadian Mint, the Nova Scotia Liquor Corporation, Ottawa Tourism, Porter Airlines, and Whistler Blackcomb ski resort.

In June 2017, the city council of Edmonton, following complaints on social media from multiple residents, pulled its online advertisements from Rebel News. City councillor Michael Oshry described content on the website as "hate mongering, or even racist".

Another activist group, Hope not Hate, pressured Norwegian Cruise Lines into cancelling a scheduled Caribbean cruise which was to feature talks by The Rebel Media personalities, many of whom have since left the media website.

=== Rebel Freedom Fund ===
In December 2017, Wells Asset Management announced the Rebel Freedom Fund, allowing investors to fund Levant's film and video projects, offering an expected 4.5% return. This attracted news coverage the following February in advance of the fund's ostensible 1 March opening date, generally negative; MoneySense, for example, stated that "This one carries a lot of risk and doesn't clear the MoneySense bar for appropriate retirement investment risk, whatever the political orientation." In June, however, Wells announced that it was shutting down all its funds, and when queried by a reporter from Maclean's, stated that the Rebel Freedom Fund had never launched.

=== 2019 Canadian federal election ===
The writs of election for the 2019 Canadian federal election were issued by Governor General Julie Payette on September 11, 2019, and the 2019 Canadian federal election was held on October 21, 2019. The leadership debates were held on 7 October in English and 10 October in French.

On September 30, 2019, two police forces escorted Rebel Media correspondent David Menzies away from a Scheer campaign announcement.

In twin lawsuits (both filed during the morning of 7 October), Menzies and another journalist at Rebel News and Andrew James Lawton of True North Centre for Public Policy applied for judicial relief related "to identical decisions made by the Leaders' Debates Commission. The Commission [had] denied accreditation" for the Leaders' Debates to the journalists. In a stinging rebuke to the Commission, Justice Russel Zinn found that afternoon that "the Applicants have proven on the balance of probabilities that they will suffer irreparable harm if the requested Order is not granted" and thus Zinn ordered that the journalist-Applicants be accorded the same rights as the legacy media. The journalists were allowed equitable access to the media scrum that evening of 7 October after the debate.

In 2021, the Commissioner of Elections fined Rebel News $3,000 for violating third-party campaign advertising laws. The commissioner found that signs made by the organization to promote Levant's book The Libranos, which featured an image of Prime Minister Justin Trudeau and other Liberals parodying The Sopranos ought to have been registered as third-party advertising because they clearly opposed a leader during a campaign. Half of the fine was for failing to register and the other half of the fine was for not disclosing the organization behind the signage. Rebel News's application for judicial review of the decision was dismissed by the Federal Court in 2023 and by the Federal Court of Appeal in 2025.

=== Climate change denialist views ===
As early as 2019 it was noticed that Levant had used Rebel Media to promote climate change denial and advocate the interests of the oil sands extraction industry in Alberta. In an article for Canada's National Observer, columnist Max Fawcett described Rebel Media as a group who undermine "the scientific consensus around climate change and vaccines".

=== 2021 Canadian federal election ===
During the September 2021 Canadian federal election, the Leaders' Debates Commission, which was at the time chaired by former Governor-General David Johnston, again disallowed members of Rebel News from receiving accreditation to the French and English language debates. Ahead of the French language debate, an expedited ruling by Justice Elizabeth Heneghan allowed 11 members of Rebel News to attend the two debates to ask questions. Levant, whose organization had accused the commission of being "capricious, unfair, unlawful and arbitrary in denying its journalists the right to fully cover the debate" said "Today we scored one for liberty."

Justice Heneghan published her ratio decidendi in case number T-1364-21 on 7 March 2022, and wrote that "In my opinion, the Applicant established irreparable harm in terms of being prevented from participation in the political process, on behalf of the electorate. There is room in the nation for the expression of opposing points of view. The Applicant did not ask to impose its views, but for the opportunity to participate in coverage of matters of importance during a federal election."

When asked a question by Rebel News following the French debate, Prime Minister Justin Trudeau attacked the organization for spreading misinformation, especially with regard to COVID-19 vaccines and refused to "call it a media organization". The clip of the interaction went viral. NDP leader Jagmeet Singh and Bloc Québécois leader Yves-François Blanchet refused to speak to Rebel News.

=== Coverage of anti-vaccine and anti-lockdown movements ===
In December 2021, Rebel News fundraised to pay for the legal fees of Mehmet Erhan, an Adelaide, Australia resident who was arrested and charged with breaching a health order. The money was to be paid into Rebel News's Fight the Fines fund instead of Erhan's GoFundMe account. Rebel News later cut ties with Erhan, saying that they had discontinued their relationship as Erhan had allegedly "routinely switched lawyers" and acted in bad faith.

In early 2022 Rebel News provided favourable coverage of the Canada convoy protest and the Convoy to Canberra, with many of its posts linking to donation pages or fundraising campaigns. Similarweb found that the number of Canadians accessing the Rebel News website had increased by 70% between January and February 2022. Australian traffic increased by 11% over the same time period.

Elise Thomas of the Institute for Strategic Dialogue said that groups like Rebel News were utilising the anti-vaccine and anti-lockdown communities to "reinvigorate their following", saying, "The thing about these kind of fringe communities is that they are often really hyper-engaged communities, they're not getting this content anywhere else in their life".

=== Journalism tax credit ruling ===
On September 19, 2024, the Federal Court of Canada ruled that Rebel News was ineligible for Canadian journalism tax credits due to insufficient original reporting. The ruling followed a review of 423 Rebel News pieces by the Canada Revenue Agency (CRA), which found that only 10 met the standards required for original journalistic content.

Justice Ann Marie McDonald stated that "283 of the items were not based on facts, nor were multiple perspectives actively pursued, researched, analyzed, or explained by a journalist for the organization", and a further 135 were categorized as curated or rewritten content from other sources.

The court found that the CRA's decision was "justified, transparent and intelligible", noting that much of Rebel News's output consisted of opinion or republished material. The court also rejected Rebel News's argument that the denial infringed on press freedom, stating that the outlet failed to demonstrate how the ruling harmed its operations.

== Notable contributors ==
=== Current ===
- Ezra Levant
- Avi Yemini

=== Former ===
- Tanveer Ahmed
- Janice Atkinson – former Member of European Parliament
- Jack Buckby
- Michael Coren
- Éric Duhaime
- Faith Goldy
- Sebastian Gorka
- Katie Hopkins
- Barbara Kay
- Mark Latham – former leader of Australian Labor Party
- Claire Lehmann – founder/editor of Quillette
- Brian Lilley
- Laura Loomer
- Gavin McInnes
- Jack Posobiec
- Tommy Robinson
- Lauren Southern
