= Jennifer Keesmaat =

Canadian politician and urban planner (born 1970)

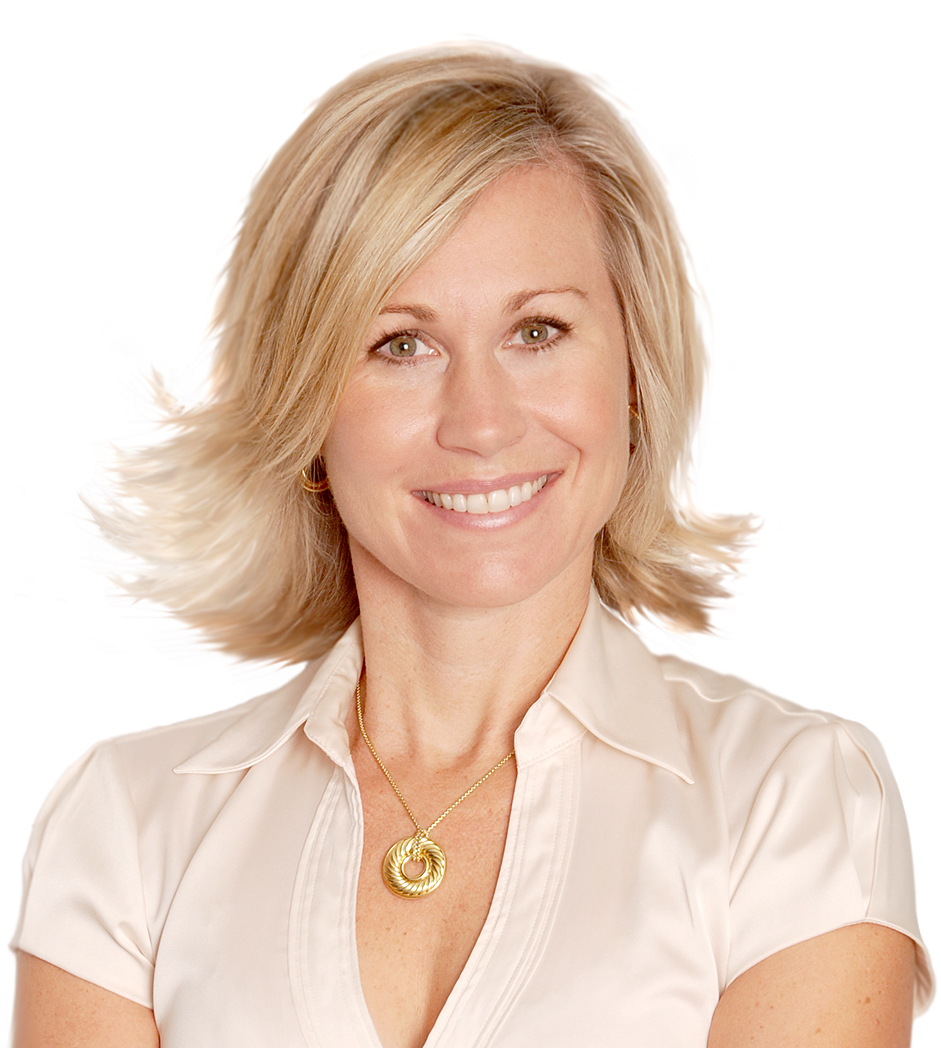
- Keesmaat in 2010

Chief City Planner of Toronto Executive Director, City Planning Division
- In office September 2012 – September 29, 2017
- Preceded by: Gary Wright
- Succeeded by: Gregg Lintern

Personal details
- Born: April 19, 1970 (age 56) Hamilton, Ontario, Canada
- Party: Independent
- Spouse: Tom Freeman
- Children: 2
- Education: University of Western Ontario; York University
- Website: thekeesmaatgroup.com

Jennifer Keesmaat (April 19, 1970) is a Canadian urban planner who was chief city planner at the City of Toronto from 2012 to 2017. After leaving municipal government, Keesmaat became CEO of Collecdev-Markee. She ran in the 2018 Toronto mayoral election, receiving 23.6 per cent of the vote and placing second to incumbent John Tory.

On August 28, 2017, she announced that she would resign from her position as chief planner, effective September 29 of the same year, and subsequently accepted a teaching position at the University of Toronto. In March 2018, Keesmaat became the CEO of the Creative Housing Society, an independent non-profit group dedicated to creation of affordable housing projects. She was named the ninth most influential person in Toronto by Toronto Life in 2014, and the 41st most important person in Canada by Maclean's in 2013.

On July 27, 2018, Keesmaat announced her candidacy for mayor of Toronto in the 2018 mayoral election. She placed second to incumbent mayor John Tory. After the mayoral election, Keesmaat founded and became CEO of The Keesmaat Group, a company that works with corporate and political leaders to advance change in cities around the world. In 2019, The Keesmaat Group founded the National Housing Innovation event series in partnership with Canada Mortgage and Housing Corporation (CMHC) and The Globe and Mail, focused on improving access to affordable housing in Canada.

Jennifer is ranked #33 on Planetizen's list of Most Influential Contemporary Urbanists and #63 on its list of Most Influential Urbanists of all time.

== Background ==
Keesmaat was the third of the four daughters of Irene, an artist, and Leonard, a builder and craftsman. Both her parents came to Canada from the Netherlands as young children. She was born and raised in Hamilton, Ontario, where she attended Calvin Christian School and then Sir Allan MacNab Secondary School. Keesmaat graduated from the University of Western Ontario in English and philosophy in 1993. She enrolled in York University in 1997 and then obtained a master's degree in environmental studies (politics and planning) by 1999. For a brief time, she worked as an executive assistant to left-leaning Councillor Joe Mihevc and former Councillor Jane Pitfield, at the Toronto City Hall, during Mel Lastman's tenure as mayor.

Before becoming the chief planner of Toronto, she had worked on master plans in Toronto, Vancouver, Mississauga, Vaughan, Regina, Saskatoon, Lethbridge, Moncton, London and Halifax. Outside of Canada, she has worked in the United States, Ireland and Greece. Along with Harold Madi and Antonio Gomez-Palacio, Keesmaat is a founder of the planning and design firm Office for Urbanism. She is also a founding partner at DIALOG. She writes articles on planning-related topics, including editorials in the Toronto Star on the importance of complete streets and Complete Communities, and in The Globe and Mail on the need to change approaches to land use planning to ensure the liveability and sustainability of Canada's future communities. She has guest lectured at Ryerson University (now Toronto Metropolitan University), York University, and the University of Toronto. She has also delivered the TEDx talks Own your City and Walk to School.

== Chief City Planner of Toronto (2012–2017) ==
She became the chief planner of Toronto in September 2012. She is an advocate of density and walkability and has described mid-rise development, transportation, and waterfront as areas of focus. She has also been a proponent of a national urban agenda by calling for an expanded role of the federal government in supporting Canadian cities. Keesmaat took a strong stance on the Gardiner Expressway debate, and "her outspokenness got her into hot water with the mayor's office. It was also reported by the City Hall Bureau Chief for the Toronto Star that Keesmaat "put her hand over a CP24 camera and walked away from an interview when asked about tensions".

To discuss her plans, she hosted public roundtables, which are live-tweeted and broadcast on Rogers TV. The Feeling Congested consultation, one of the first major projects launched by her as chief planner, uses a range of non-traditional online and offline consultation tools to reach the public.

In 2012, Keesmaat proposed 14 new taxes which might raise revenue to finance new government spending.

In March 2017, she was quoted in a Canadian Broadcasting Corporation article discussing threats to the Greenbelt by developers claiming to need additional land to build housing. Research conducted by the CBC confirmed that a great deal of serviced land was already available in the area and that builders were not proceeding in spite of the availability. Oakville Mayor Rob Burton made the following comment "we've given them serviced land they're sitting on" and Keesmaat was quoted as saying that "builders control supply in this region. 118,610 serviced units approved and not yet built in Toronto."

=== Resignation as Chief Planner and CEO of Creative Housing Society ===
In late August 2017, Keesmaat announced that she was leaving her role with the City after public disagreements with Mayor John Tory on several policies, including the debate about tearing down the aging and costly Gardiner Expressway. City Councillor Joe Mihevc praised Keesmaat's value to the City: "In the case of the Gardiner, she was speaking truth to power", Mr. Mihevc said. "We needed a provocateur...She pushed us to think at a higher level."

Keesmaat subsequently became the CEO of the Creative Housing Society, a not-for-profit organization dedicated to the creation of affordable rental housing in Canada’s major cities. Her LinkedIn profile indicates that she was Chief Executive Officer of the Society from March–July 2018. The group is "dedicated to building affordable, purpose-built rental housing [particularly in Toronto and Vancouver] at a scale that’s really never been done before in the Canadian context", she told TVOntario in early April 2018.

== CEO of The Keesmaat Group ==
In 2018, Keesmaat founded The Keesmaat Group, which works with progressive cities and organizations around the world to advance change. The Keesmaat Group has provided strategic advice related to various aspects of urban planning and city building to clients in cities around the world, including Melbourne, Sydney, Vancouver, Abu Dhabi, Singapore, and London.

== 2018 Toronto mayoral election ==
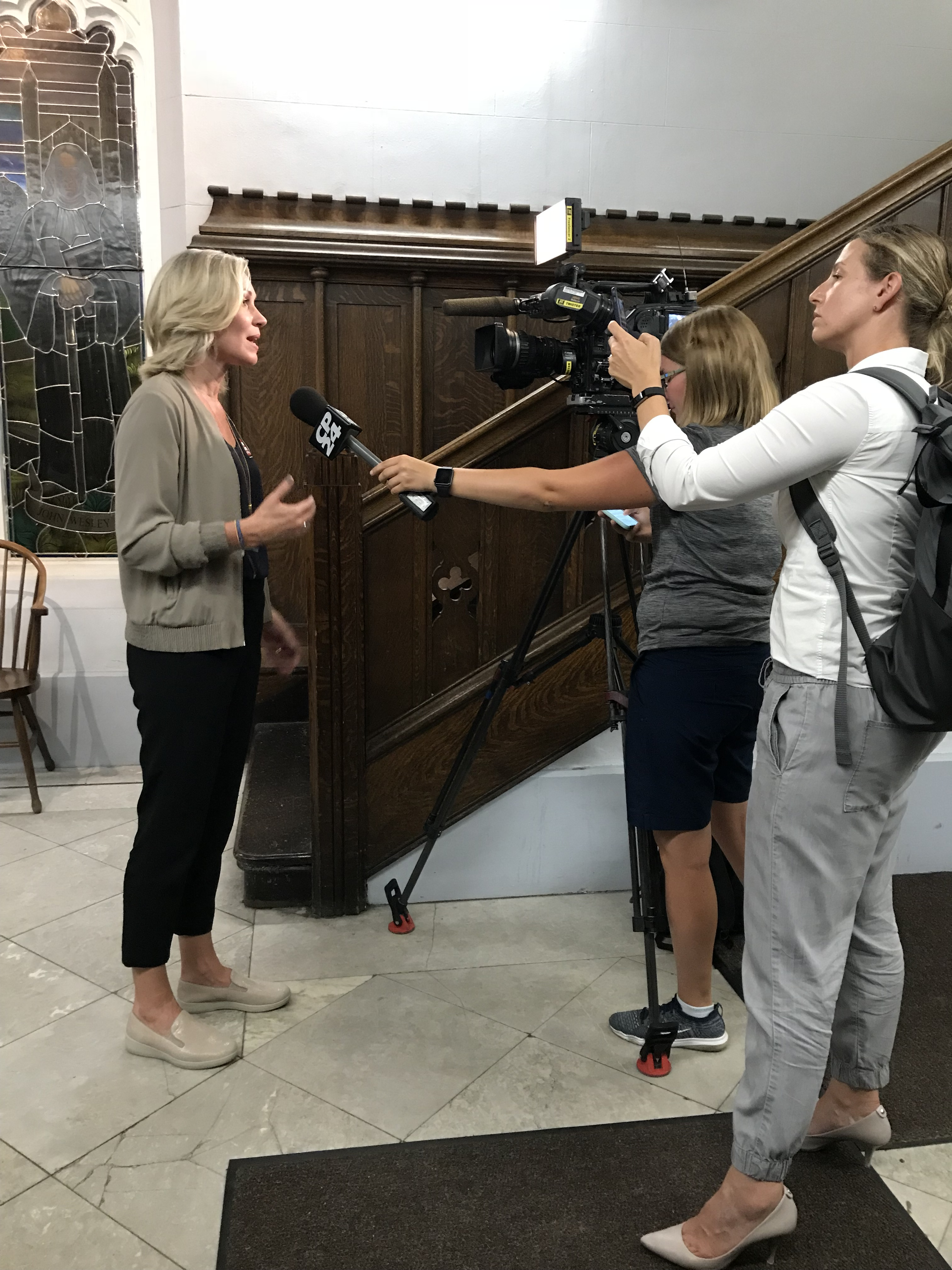
Keesmaat gives an interview with CP24 in the Metropolitan United Church.

Jennifer Keesmaat's share of the vote in the 2018 Toronto mayoral election, in each ward

On July 27, 2018, Keesmaat announced her intention to run for Mayor of Toronto in the 2018 municipal elections, focusing much of her campaign on key priorities including transit, traffic, housing affordability, and road safety. In reaction to Premier Doug Ford's plan to cut Toronto City Council by half, Keesmaat tweeted that Toronto should secede from Ontario and become Canada's eleventh province. Veteran Canadian political strategist, Brian Topp, was Keesmaat's campaign manager. A number of prominent local and international figures and organizations endorsed Keesmaat for mayor, including Olivia Chow, a former city councillor and Member of Parliament, Toronto city councillors Kristyn Wong-Tam, Joe Cressy, Mike Layton, and Josh Matlow, noted urbanists including former Vancouver Chief Planner Brent Toderian and renowned urban planner Gil Peñalosa, and the Elementary Teachers of Toronto (ETT), which represents 11,000 teachers in Toronto’s public elementary schools. On October 22, 2018, Keesmaat lost the mayoral election to incumbent mayor John Tory.

=== Transit ===
Keesmaat promised to make the King Street Pilot Project, which she spearheaded as Chief Planner, permanent. Building on her experience guiding much of Toronto's transit expansion planning as Chief Planner, she also introduced an ambitious, city-wide network transit plan that included new subway, LRT, and bus rapid transit infrastructure. Keesmaat told the media that her plan "goes beyond 'election cycles' and provides a blueprint for decades of development...This is about real transit and a real plan for the City of Toronto over the long term."

=== Road safety ===
In an effort to end preventable pedestrian deaths Keesmaat committed to reduce the speed limit on all residential roads in Toronto to 30 km/h (currently the speed limit is 50 km/h, or 40 km/h for school zones), and to make every school zone safe by design.

=== Gardiner Expressway ===
Keesmaat promised to tear down the eastern section of the aging and decaying Gardiner Expressway and replace it with a ground level boulevard, pointing out that cities all over North America are choosing to tear down urban expressways rather than spending hundreds of millions of dollars on maintaining outdated infrastructure. Keesmaat said the move would save the city roughly $500 million as opposed to re-building the decaying urban expressway, and that the decision would unlock "New communities with new jobs in retail and employment and affordable housing — places for people to live — by unlocking this land...This is really about creating a livable city. It's about creating a sustainable city. It's about creating a green city, and it is about moving Toronto into the 21st century", said Keesmaat.

=== Affordable housing and public safety ===
Keesmaat proposed a property tax increase on the sale of luxury homes to help pay for building 100,000 units of affordable housing. She also supports a municipal handgun ban. Keesmaat had pledged funding to double the number of emergency response mental health workers and to enhance community policing efforts by ensuring community police officers are assigned to every one of Toronto's 140 neighbourhoods.

=== Other ===
Keesmaat also unveiled detailed plans to enhance gender fairness in the Toronto municipal bureaucracy, support and promote the arts, improve transparency at municipal agencies, and build clean, green, and sustainable infrastructure.

=== Election results ===
2018 Toronto mayoral election
Candidate	Votes	%
John Tory	479,659	63.49
Jennifer Keesmaat	178,193	23.59
Faith Goldy	25,667	3.40
Saron Gebresellassi	15,222	2.01
64 other candidates	56,752	7.51
Total	755,493	100.00

== Personal life ==
Keesmaat lives with her family near Yonge and Eglinton. She is married to Tom Freeman, who runs FH Hospitality, a Toronto-based sales firm that supplies fixtures and furniture to hotels. Together, Keesmaat and Freeman have two children, Alexandra and Luis.
