= Terry Adirim =

American physician

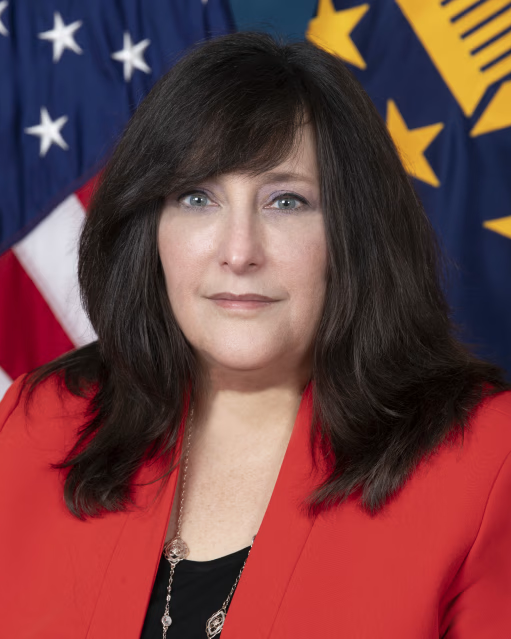
- Adirim in 2021

Assistant Secretary of Defense for Health Affairs
- Acting
- In office January 21, 2021 – December 19, 2021
- President: Joe Biden
- Preceded by: Thomas P. McCaffery
- Succeeded by: Lester Martínez López

Personal details
- Education: Brandeis University; University of Miami; Harvard University; University of Massachusetts Amherst

Terry Adirim is an American physician with experience in pediatric emergency medicine, health policy, and medical administration. She was the senior associate dean for clinical affairs, professor of pediatrics, and department chair at Florida Atlantic University before serving as the acting assistant secretary of defense for health affairs in 2021. Adirim was the senior executive of the Center for Global Health Services at the Central Intelligence Agency until 2025.

== Education ==
Adirim earned a B.A. in biology from Brandeis University in 1985. She completed a M.D. with research distinction from the University of Miami Miller School of Medicine in 1991. The same year, she earned a M.P.H. from Harvard T.H. Chan School of Public Health.

Adirim completed internship and residency in pediatrics at the Children's Hospital of Philadelphia from 1991 to 1994. From 1994 to 1996, she subsequently completed a fellowship in pediatric emergency medicine at Children's National Hospital. From 2000 to 2001, Adirim undertook a fellowship in primary care sports medicine at DeWitt Army Community Hospital and the Uniformed Services University of the Health Sciences, in collaboration with Children's National Hospital.

Adirim served as a science and technology policy fellow from the American Association for the Advancement of Science from 2006 to 2007. In 2017, Adirim completed a M.B.A. from the Isenberg School of Management at University of Massachusetts Amherst.

== Career ==
From 2006 to 2010, Adirim was a senior advisor for science and public health in the office of health affairs in the U.S. Department of Homeland Security and afterwards was the Director of the office of special health affairs at the Health Resources and Services Administration from 2010 to 2014.

Adirim returned to Philadelphia as an attending physician at St. Christopher's Hospital for Children; professor of pediatrics and emergency medicine at Drexel University College of Medicine, as well as director of academic advancement in the department of emergency medicine. She held an academic appointment as an adjunct professor at the Uniformed Services University of the Health Sciences. She is a fellow of the American Academy of Pediatrics.

Adirim served in the U.S. Department of Defense as the deputy assistant secretary of defense for health services policy and oversight and subsequently as the acting principal deputy assistant secretary of defense for health affairs (ASD(HA)). In those roles, she provided leadership over the Military Health System (MHS).

Adirim joined the Charles E. Schmidt College of Medicine, as senior associate dean for clinical affairs, professor of pediatrics, and chair of the department of integrated medical sciences. In these roles, she oversaw patient care operations, clinical translational research, and the Florida Atlantic University medicine faculty practice, managing a department that included approximately 80 core faculty and 1,100 community-based affiliate faculty members.

From January 21, 2021 to December 19, 2021, Adirim was the principal deputy assistant secretary of defense and served as the ASD(HA). In that capacity, she advised the U.S. Secretary of Defense, Lloyd Austin and the Under Secretary of Defense for Personnel and Readiness on matters related to health and force health protection policies, programs, and activities. In 2021, Adirim advised Austin on policies related to the implementation of the COVID-19 vaccine mandate for military personnel.

In late 2021, Adirim became the executive director of the U.S. Department of Veterans Affairs electronic health record modernization (EHRM) integration office in order to address challenges identified in the Department’s strategic review report in connection with the initial roll-out of the Department’s electronic health record (EHR) system at a Spokane, Washington medical center prior to her tenure. During her tenure, a report from the VA Office of Inspector General cited nearly 150 instances of patient harm at that initial Spokane deployment site linked to the new electronic health record system. During her tenure the VA successfully implemented the new EHR system at four additional sites but ongoing issues in Spokane and other concerns prompted the VA to pause further deployments of the Oracle Cerner system at other medical facilities. Adirim provided testimony at multiple congressional hearings on the status of the EHRM program. She left the position on February 25, 2023.

Adirim worked as a senior executive at the Central Intelligence Agency's Center for Global Health Services. She was terminated from that role on April 4, 2025. She subsequently filed a lawsuit alleging defamation, due process, privacy, and contract violations, claiming the dismissal was related to her prior involvement in military vaccination policy. A federal judge denied her request to prevent the termination from taking effect without ruling on the other pending claims.
