= John Tory (disambiguation) =

John Tory (born 1954) was the 65th mayor of Toronto, who was in office from 2014 to 2023.

John Tory may also refer to:

- John A. Tory (1930–2011), Canadian lawyer, corporate executive and father of the former mayor
- John S. D. Tory (1903–1965), Canadian lawyer and grandfather of the former mayor

== See also ==
- John Torrey (1796–1873), American scientist
- John Torry (1800–1879), Scottish Episcopalian priest
- John Troy (disambiguation)
