= Joe Pennachetti =

Canadian public servant

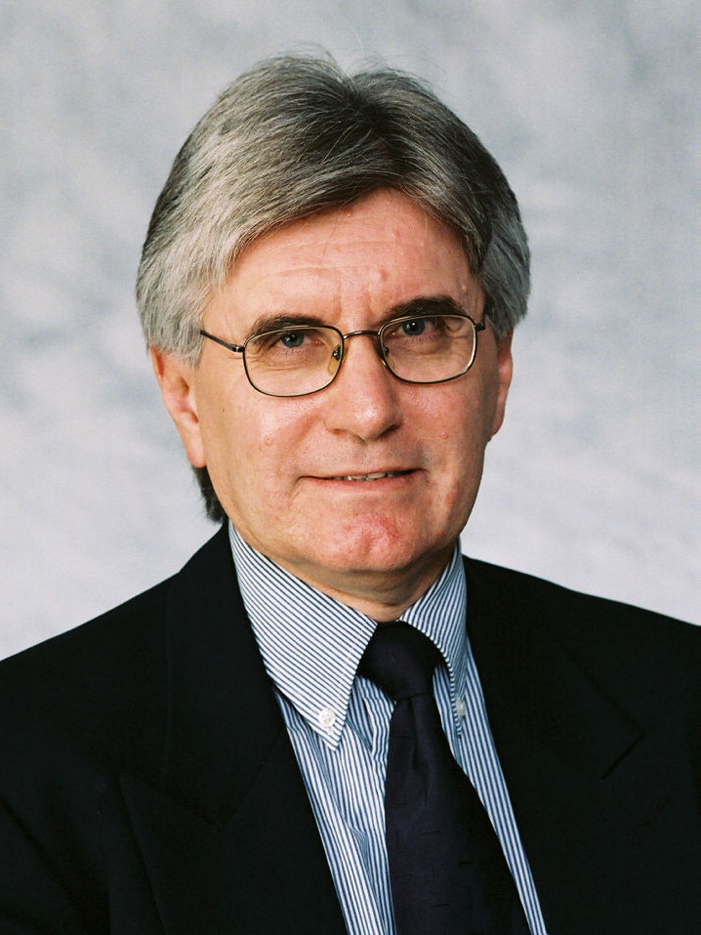
- Pennachetti in 2002

Toronto City Manager
- In office October 6, 2008 – May 8, 2015
- Nominated by: David Miller
- Preceded by: Shirley Hoy
- Succeeded by: Peter Wallace

Personal details
- Education: University of Windsor, MBA

Joseph Peter James Pennachetti is Canadian public servant who served as the city manager for the City of Toronto from 2008 to 2015. He is presently the chair of the Ontario Clean Water Agency (OCWA) board of directors.

Pennachetti is a senior fellow at the Munk School of Global Affairs and Public Policy's Institute on Municipal Finance and Governance (IMFG) at the University of Toronto.

== Career ==
=== Early career ===
Pennachetti holds a master of business administration from the University of Windsor and is a certified general accountant. Prior to joining the City of Toronto, he was the treasurer and commissioner of finance in Peel Region. He held the same job in York Region from 1990 to 1995. He has also worked with the municipal governments of Edmonton and Durham Region.

=== City of Toronto ===
Pennachetti joined the City of Toronto as its deputy city manager and chief financial officer in 2002, before he was selected to replace Shirley Hoy as city manager in 2008, a role in which he served until 2015. John Tory, the mayor of Toronto, nominated Peter Wallace to succeed Pennachetti as city manager.

He previously served as the city's deputy city manager and chief financial officer (CFO) from 2002 to October 6, 2008, when Mayor David Miller appointed him to replace retiring city manager Shirley Hoy. Initially announcing he would step down in November 2014, Pennachetti stayed in the role until May 8, 2015, at the request of Mayor Tory.

Pennachetti has worked in the administrations of Toronto mayors Mel Lastman (as CFO), David Miller, Robert Ford and John Tory.

== See also ==
- Municipal government of Toronto
- Politics of Toronto
