= Chris Murray (Canadian civil servant) =

Canadian civil servant

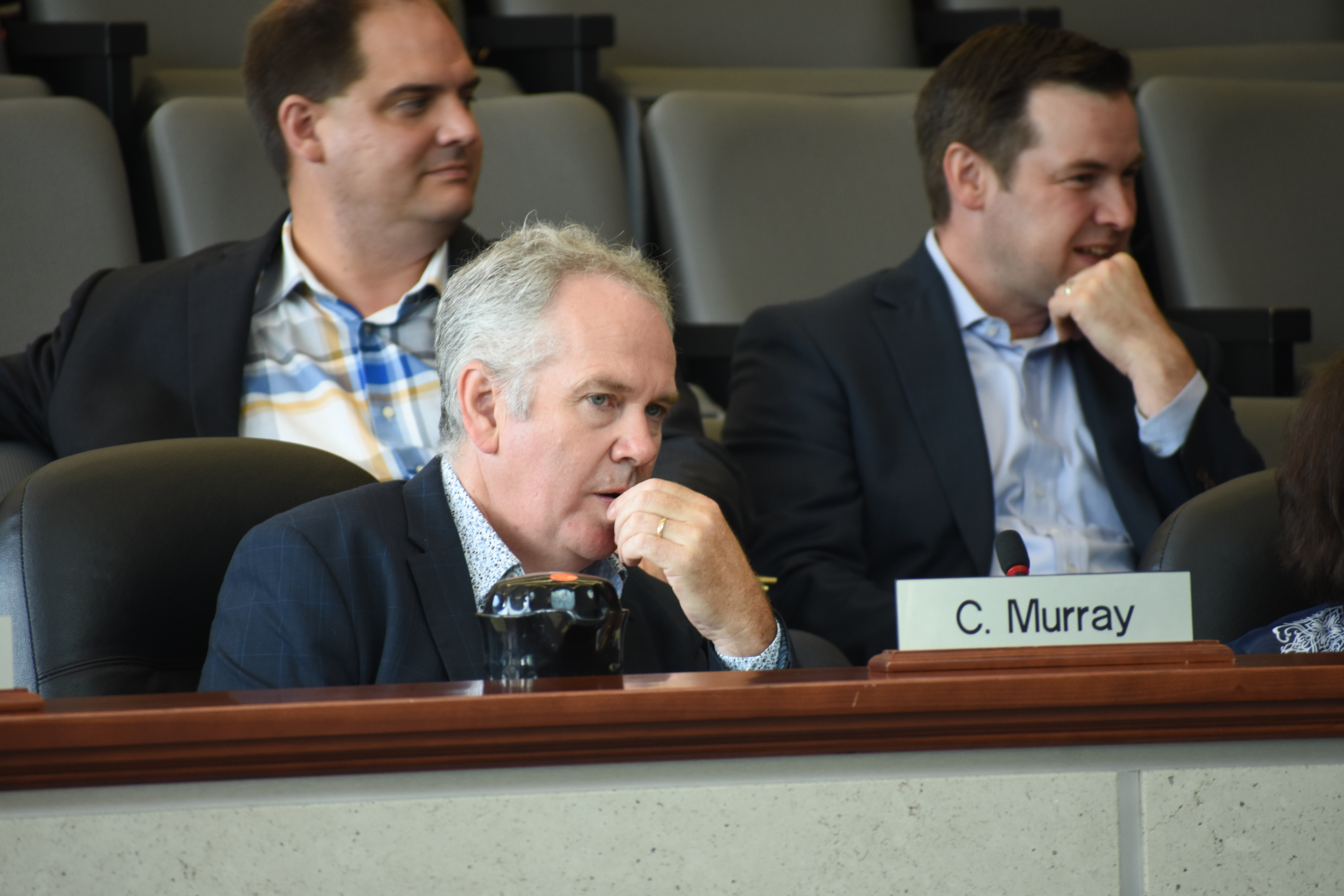
- Murray (in foreground) in 2017

Interim Hamilton City Manager
- Incumbent
- Assumed office November 19, 2026
- Appointed by: Keanin Loomis
- Preceded by: Mike Zegarac (interim)
- In office January 2009 – August 2018

Toronto City Manager
- In office August 13, 2018 – August 19, 2022
- Appointed by: Toronto City Council
- Mayor: John Tory
- Preceded by: Peter Wallace; Giuliana Carbone (interim)

Personal details
- Profession: City planner

Christopher Murray is a Canadian urban planner and civil servant who has been the interim city manager of Hamilton, Ontario, since 2026. Murray served as the city manager for the City of Toronto from 2018 to 2022. Originally from Fredericton, New Brunswick, Murray previously was the city manager of Hamilton from 2009 to 2018 and was chair of the Municipal Benchmarking Network of Canada.

Murray was appointed as Toronto's city manager in June 2018 and assumed the role on August 13, 2018, following the departure of Peter Wallace, who was appointed secretary of the Treasury Board of Canada. He resigned as city manager of Toronto on August 19, 2022. Prior to assuming his role with the City of Toronto, Murray had served as Hamilton's city manager for nearly a decade from 2009 to 2018.

== Career ==
=== City of Hamilton ===
Murray is trained as a city planner and joined Hamilton-Wentworth's planning department in 1995, taking on the role of project manager and heading environmental planning, transportation and housing until his appointment as city manager in January 2009.

Notable projects which Murray worked on in Hamilton include the Red Hill Expressway, where he was project manager, developing Hamilton's 2012 to 2015 strategic plan, negotiations between the City of Hamilton and the Tiger Cats football franchise regarding their new stadium, area-rated taxation in amalgamated communities, and addressing various high-profile "culture" problems within the Hamilton public service.

In November 2026, Hamilton Mayor Keanin Loomis announced that Murray would be reappointed as the city manager of Hamilton in an interim basis while the city recruits for a new city manager.

=== City of Toronto ===
Following the departure of city manager Peter Wallace, who was appointed secretary of the Treasury Board of Canada, John Tory, the mayor of Toronto, nominated Murray to be the new city manager. Prior to his appointment, Murray outlined various organizational changes he wished to make, including restructuring city divisions and creating a new chief of staff position.

Murray announced on June 9, 2022, his intention to step down as city manager of Toronto. He officially vacated the position on August 19. Tracey Cook, a deputy city manager, acted in the role until the appointment of Paul Johnson on December 2.

==== Anti-Black racism ====
On June 4, 2020, following the murder of George Floyd, Murray spoke out against anti-Black racism, saying "silence is not an option." Murray noted that he does not "worry that the next George Floyd will be me, my child or my family member", that "racialized and immigrant communities are providing Toronto with more front-line and personal support workers who put themselves at risk every day than other communities", and he encouraged city staff to "speak up and take action for change."

== See also ==
- Municipal government of Toronto
- Politics of Toronto
