= Denise Andrea Campbell =

Canadian equity activist

Toronto Deputy City Manager for Community Development and Social Services
- Incumbent
- Assumed office April 22, 2025
- Appointed by: Toronto City Council
- City Manager: Paul Johnson
- Preceded by: Position established

Personal details
- Born: Port Antonio, Jamaica
- Education: University of Ottawa (BSocSc); McGill University (MMgmt)

Denise Andrea Campbell is a Canadian civil servant who is the deputy city manager for community development and social services at the City of Toronto since 2025. Campbell was previously the executive director of the Social Development, Finance and Administration (SDFA) Division from 2019 to 2025 and has worked for the City of Toronto since 2004.

== Early life and education ==
Campbell was born in Jamaica and moved to Canada at age 5. She grew up in South Oshawa and attended G. L. Roberts Collegiate and Vocational Institute. As a teen, she won numerous awards including the YTV Achievement Award for Public Service and winning the National Law Essay Contest for her writing on Sexual Assault and the Treatment of Women in the Legal System. After high school, she went on to earn an honours bachelor of social science (BSocSc) in Political Science at the University of Ottawa and a master's in management at McGill University.

== Career ==
=== Early career ===
At age 19, Campbell was cohost for a season of the show, Girl Talk, on Women’s Television Network (WTN) and she hosted thirteen documentaries on international developments, Global Villagers. She became the youngest president of the National Action Committee on the Status of Women in 2001, but resigned soon after given fundamental difference with the Executive about how to solve NAC’s financial challenges as the organization faced financial crisis.

Campbell created a photography book, “I Am Jack Layton: A People’s Tribute of Love, Hope and Optimism”.

=== City of Toronto ===
Campbell joined the City of Toronto in 2004.

In 2019, Campbell was appointed as the Social Development, Finance and Administration Division's executive director. In this role, she led the development of the Toronto Community Crisis Service, the city's plans for, community safety and wellbeing, anti-Black racism, and community vaccine mobilization with Toronto Public Health. In 2021, Toronto Life named her one of Toronto’s 50 Most Influential People for her work developing the community crisis service. Campbell was awarded the Lieutenant Governor’s Medal of Distinction in Public Administration in November 2024.

Campbell was appointed as the deputy city manager for community development and social services in 2025 following a re-organization of the community and social services portfolio.

== Family life ==
Campbell is married and has twin boys.
