= Peter Wallace (civil servant) =

Canadian public servant

Secretary of the Treasury Board of Canada
- In office April 4, 2018 – November 2021
- Prime Minister: Justin Trudeau
- Preceded by: Yaprak Baltacioğlu
- Succeeded by: Graham Flack

Toronto City Manager
- In office July 13, 2015 – April 3, 2018
- Nominated by: John Tory
- Preceded by: Joe Pennachetti
- Succeeded by: Chris Murray

Secretary of the Cabinet Head of the Ontario Public Service Clerk to the Executive Council
- In office 2011–2014
- Premier: Dalton McGuinty; Kathleen Wynne

Personal details
- Education: University of Toronto, (BA, 1980; MPA, 1981)

Peter Wallace is a Canadian former public servant who was the secretary of the Treasury Board of Canada from 2018 to 2021. Prior to joining the Government of Canada, Wallace was the city manager for the City of Toronto from 2015 to 2018, and held senior roles in the Ontario provincial government including as secretary to the Cabinet.

== Background ==
Wallace completed a Bachelor of Arts (Honours) in Political Economy in 1980, and a Master of Public Administration (MPA) from the University of Toronto, before beginning his career in 1981.

== Career ==
=== Ontario Public Service ===
Wallace held a number of roles with the provincial government of Ontario. He began his career in 1981.

Before his appointment as the secretary of the Cabinet, he was deputy minister of finance and secretary to the Treasury Board of Ontario, and also served as the deputy minister of Energy. Previously, he was the deputy minister and associate secretary of the Cabinet for policy in Cabinet Office.

He was made the secretary of the Cabinet and head of the Ontario Public Service in 2011 serving until 2014, when he was an Ontario Public Service Visiting Fellow at the School of Public Policy and Governance at the University of Toronto.

=== City of Toronto ===
Wallace was initially part of a panel in 2014 that sought to find a replacement for retiring city manager Joe Pennachetti, before deciding to join the running himself. On May 5, 2015, Toronto City Council held a private session to discuss Wallace's selection after he was approved by Mayor John Tory and the Executive Committee and he was appointed following a unanimous vote in Council. Wallace was the city manager for three years from July 13, 2015, until he stepped down effective April 3, 2018, to accept a role leading the Treasury Board of Canada Secretariat. Deputy city manager Giuliana Carbone replaced him until the appointment of Chris Murray on a permanent basis.

=== Federal government ===
Wallace was appointed as secretary of the Treasury Board on the advice of Prime Minister Justin Trudeau effective April 4, 2018. The secretary is deputy minister of the department, reporting to the president of the Treasury Board.

Wallace left the Government of Canada in November 2021.
