= Tory family =

Canadian family

Tory Torey, Torrey
- Country: Canada
- Current region: Ontario
- Origin: Scotland
- Titles: Member of the Legislative Assembly; Lieutenant Governor of Nova Scotia; Member of Provincial Parliament; Mayor of Toronto

The Tory family is a prominent family of businessmen, lawyers, and politicians in Canada, some members of which are associated with the Toronto law firm Torys. The family traces its roots back to Nova Scotia with the immigration of James Tory (1753–1834) of Aberdeenshire, Scotland. James enlisted in the 71st Highlanders to fight in the American Revolutionary War, and was granted land in Guysborough County following the British defeat. The family's most lasting influence is in Ontario, beginning with John Alexander Tory Sr.

Most notable members of the family are descended from Robert Kirk Tory, a farmer in Port Shoreham, Nova Scotia. Another notable Tory descended from James Torey is Havelocke Torrey, who like his cousin James Cranswick Tory was also Member of the Legislative Assembly for Guysborough.

== Notable family members ==
- Robert Kirk Tory (1838–1892) - Methodist minister and farmer in Port Shoreham, Nova Scotia. Progenitor of the Tory family.
  - Henry Marshall Tory (1864-1947) - Founding president of the University of Alberta, Carleton University, and the University of British Columbia. Established the Khaki University,and was the founding president of the National Research Council Canada.
  - James Cranswick Tory (1867–1944) - General Manager of Agencies and later company director at Sun Life. Member of the Legislative Assembly for Guysborough 1911–1925, and Lieutenant Governor of Nova Scotia 1925–1930.
  - Sarah Jane Tory (1867-1966) - Mother of Charles Tory Bruce
  - John Alexander Tory Sr. (1869-1950) - Head of Western Ontario operations for Sun Life Assurance Company, later a company director. President of the Toronto Board of Trade 1929-1930.
    - John Stewart Donald Tory (1903–1965) - Founder of the law firm Torys, director at A.V. Roe. Officer of the Order of the British Empire and Queen's Counsel.
      - James Marshall Tory (1930–2013) - Partner at Torys.
        - Richard Tory - Lawyer and investment banker. President of Morgan Stanley Canada since 2024.
      - John Alexander Tory Jr. (1930–2011) Toronto lawyer and media executive with Thomson Reuters and Rogers Communications
        - John Howard Tory (1954–) - Lawyer, media executive (Rogers Communications), broadcaster with CFRB-AM, Commissioner of the Canadian Football League. Mayor of Toronto (2014-2023), former leader of the Progressive Conservative Party of Ontario (2004–2009) and MPP for Dufferin—Peel—Wellington—Grey (2005–2007).
        - Michael Tory - Investment banker. Co-founder and former Chairman of Ondra LLP
    - James Marshall (J.M.) Tory (1904–1994) - Manager of Sun Life Insurance's Queen branch in Toronto.
      - Edward Alexander Tory (1938–1994)
- Havelocke Torrey (1867-1949) - Member of the Legislative Assembly for Guysborough from 1937-1945.
