= Canadian Mental Health Association =

Canadian non-profit organization

- Formation: April 22, 1918; 108 years ago
- Founder: Clarence M. Hincks; Clifford W. Beers
- Registration no.: 10686 3657 RR0001
- Headquarters: Toronto, Ontario
- Location: Canada
- National President and Lead Executive Officer: Marion Cooper
- Website: www.cmha.ca

The Canadian Mental Health Association (CMHA) is a Canadian non-profit mental health organization that focuses on resources, programs and advocacy. It was founded on April 22, 1918, by Clarence M. Hincks and Clifford W. Beers. Originally named the Canadian National Committee for Mental Hygiene, it is one of the largest and oldest non-profit mental health organizations operating in Canada.

Each year, CMHA divisions and branches across Canada provide service to more than 1.3 million Canadians annually through the combined efforts of more than 10,000 volunteers and 5,000 staff in locally run organizations in more than 300 communities in every province. Its functions are to provide the resources and programs necessary to combat mental health issues and support recovery. The CMHA runs multiple programs a year focused on raising awareness for mental health issues while supporting partner organizations and relevant initiatives. The association is also known to release public statements addressing different laws, regulations, and governmental initiatives that affect mental health.

== History ==
=== Creation ===
The Canadian Mental Health Association originally started as the Canadian National Committee for Mental Hygiene (CNCMH) in response to the hundreds of soldiers returning from World War I experiencing mental illness. Veterans were placed in prisons and asylums and Clarence M. Hincks noticed the lack of support, doctors and treatment inside these institutions, thus creating the need to change. Hincks, unsure how to proceed, partnered with Clifford W. Beers who had experience in the National Committee of Mental Hygiene in the United States to bring mental hygiene to Canada.

The first official meeting of the CNCMH was held in Ottawa on April 26, 1918. A provisional constitution was adopted, C.F. Martin, Professor of Medicine at McGill University, was elected President, Charles Kirk Clarke was appointed Medical Director, and C.M. Hincks was appointed Associate Medical Director and Secretary.

The meeting aimed to devise a plan to best assist those already in need as well as to establish preventative measures in the future. This included objectives like a psychiatric and mental examinations of recruits, ensuring adequate facilities for diagnosis and proper treatment for soldiers returning suffering from a mental disability or disease, and prevention of mental disease and deficiency.

Hincks then worked on finding doctors, creating a Board of Directors, and gaining donors to build his committee. With an importance of having a team of approved medical professions, Hincks discovered C.K. Clarke, Dean of Medicine and Professor of Psychiatry at the University of Toronto, and the medical faculty of McGill. Hincks selected 18 members for his Board of Directors, including well known names like Lord Shaughnessy, President of the CPR; Richard B. Angus, Montreal financier and philanthropist; C.F. Martin, Professor of Medicine, McGill University; Sir Vincent Meredith, President, Bank of Montreal; and F.W. Molson, President of Molson's Brewery.

Hincks utilized co-founder Clifford W. Beers personal experience in mental health as a tool to share during "drawing-room meetings", or afternoon teas with influential women in order to gain the support of their wealthy friends. The strategy was extended to homes of friends in Quebec City, Montreal and Ottawa, and it proved successful by recruiting an impressive list of potential members and donors.

=== Surveys ===
One of the first opportunities for the association was a project given by Lieutenant Colonel Colin Russel who asked CNCMH to visit all mental institutions—jails, schools, hospitals, and special homes—in the province of Manitoba caring for soldiers. Russel had previously visited these sites and was distressed with the conditions of the facilities as well as the treatment and hoped to change them.

On September 30, 1918, Hincks and his secretary Miss Marjorie Keyes arrived and visited several institutions including the Salvation Army Industrial Home and the Home for Incurables in Portage la Prairie. Hincks and Keyes then submitted a formal report of surveys to the government and the Public Welfare Commission. Requests for similar surveys began to occur in other provinces. During the next four years, requests for surveys were received from British Columbia, New Brunswick, Nova Scotia, Prince Edward Island, Alberta, and Saskatchewan. Surveys reviled the impact war had on individuals, highlighting neuropsychiatric disorders and mental health diseases, as well as the improper treatment and care of soldiers. This project helped to pave the way of the National Committee and extend their focus to more than just soldiers.

Original surveys conducted for the Lieutenant showed the extent of mental disorder was found to be greater than expected and extended beyond veterans. Surveys in schools showed a large number of intellectual disability and psychiatric disorders in children. However, according to the organization, programs to address the children's needs were non-existent. CNCMH recommended the government spend over six million dollars to improve facilities and establish auxiliary classes for the special education of such children.

Subsequently, 150 special classes were established, rehabilitation of soldiers suffering from mental health issues was properly addressed, and there was a reduction in the new number of cases of Canadians with mental disorders.

=== Kingston branch closure ===
In March 2020, the Canadian Mental Health Association was forced to close down its Kingston Branch due to a lack of financial support. After 40 years of operations, the branch's overhead costs were too high to sustain and were not being met through the fundraising efforts and grants that fuel the organization. A change in Ontario's health funding as well as insufficient donations did not provide adequate capital to continue operations. The branch focused on ensuring programs previously offered through the Kingston CMHA would be adopted and available through other non-for-profit agencies, including the Polson Park Free Methodist Church, TransFamily Kingston, and Elizabeth Fry Kingston. All remaining funds were donated to community organizations.

== Programs ==
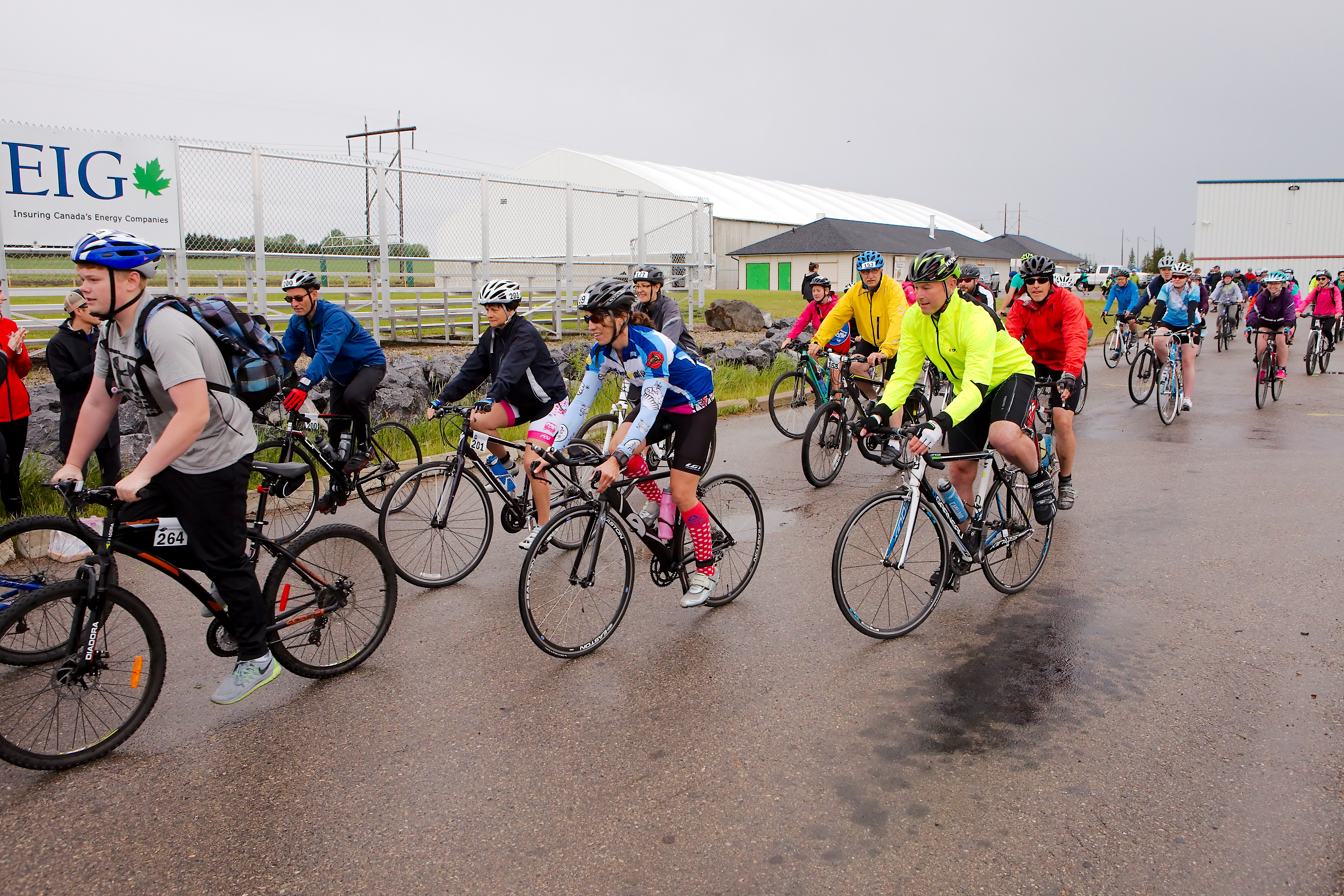
Canadian Mental Health Association's third annual Ride Don't Hide community bike ride & fundraising event in Calgary, June 2016

=== Peer Support Canada ===
Peer Support Canada is an organization which specializes in connecting certified people who have experienced and beaten mental health issues with current sufferers. The group also offers a certification, a three-phase program where individuals are assessed and verified based on the national Standards of Practice regarding the knowledge and skills necessary to assist those with mental health challenges. The organization has 9 certification committee members and 13 peer support members who provide as a contributor to the recovery process.

=== Not Myself Today ===
Not Myself Today is a campaign addressing mental health issues by cultivating a better workplace culture through training and services in corporations. Companies that use the program receive a toolkit containing planning support, awareness and engagement activities, and evaluation tools. Participants also have access to an exclusive online portal, as well as national recognition from the Canadian Mental Health Association. Currently, 450 organizations and 380,000 employees have utilized the campaign's programs.

=== Carryit ===
The CMHA introduced Carryit in 2019, a toolkit to be used by those involved in schools to carry with them in case of opioid overdoses. The kit includes a method by which schools can create opioid overdose protocols through providing educational materials on opioids and naloxone, fact sheets related to drug use, social media content examples, posters, and other useful tools to create an understanding and blueprint of how to combat drug overdoses in educational institutions.

=== Recovery colleges ===
The CMHA has introduced Recovery Colleges that bring together both trained professionals and those who have lived with mental health issues to develop and deliver courses designed to facilitate the hope and skills necessary to help students recover. Recovery Colleges are also available to anyone who like to support mental health sufferers. They are based on a similar system that was started in 2009 in the UK and have spread to several locations in Canada, thus far. Peer Support Canada has also played an integral role in connecting those with shared experiences to provide emotional support and have collaborative discussions in how to achieve recovery.

=== Toronto Community Crisis Service ===
The CMHA is a partner agency of the City of Toronto's Toronto Community Crisis Service pilot program. It provides crisis workers in Toronto's northwest, which respond to non-emergency, non-violent mental health calls as an alternative to police.

== Policy statements ==
The CMHA releases public statements criticizing local, provincial, and federal regulation as they pertain to mental health. Often, the statements express the organization's perspective on a certain issue and subsequently call for action.

=== Medical Assistance in Dying (MAiD) ===
In June 2016, Bill C-14 passed through the Parliament of Canada to legalize euthanasia in Canada. The bill made it so that those who wish to receive a medically assisted death are permitted to do so through the assistance of a medical practitioner. In September 2017, the Canadian Mental Health Association released a public declaration declaring their position that MAiD for psychiatric patients should remain illegal, asserting that recovery is possible for those with mental health issues and that committing suicide should not be treated as a substitute for treatment and support. The CMHA proposed recommendations to the Canadian government including investments in mental health and addiction services, a national suicide prevention strategy, and research.

=== Call for Mental Health Legislation ===
In September 2018, CMHA called for new legislation to bring mental health into balance with physical health. This statement followed a survey commissioned by the CMHA discovered that over half of Canadians (53%) consider anxiety and depression to be 'epidemic' in Canada.

=== Opioid Crisis Response ===
Following the escalating rates of opioid-related injuries and deaths in Canada in 2009, CMHA developed and in-depth evidence-based policy and regulation paper directed at the Canadian government, policy markers and health organizations.

=== Proposal to Establish a National Health Human Resources Infrastructure Fund ===
In August 2009, the CMHA endorsed Health Action Lobby's (HEAL) document concluding that a health human resources infrastructure is required in Canada. CMHA cited an aging workforce and a higher volume and complexity of population health needs as reasons to establish this fund, along with the fact that the last similar act (Health Resources Fund Act) was introduced over 50 years ago in 1966.

== See also ==
- Mental health
- Mental Health Commission of Canada
- Mary Scullion
- Ride Don't Hide - Charity riding event to raise awareness of mental issues
- Centre for Addiction and Mental Health
- Healthcare in Canada
