= James Tory =

James Tory may refer to:

- James Cranswick Tory (1862–1944), Nova Scotia businessman and politician
- James Marshall Tory (1930–2013), Toronto corporate lawyer
