= Shirley Hoy =

Canadian politician (born 1951)

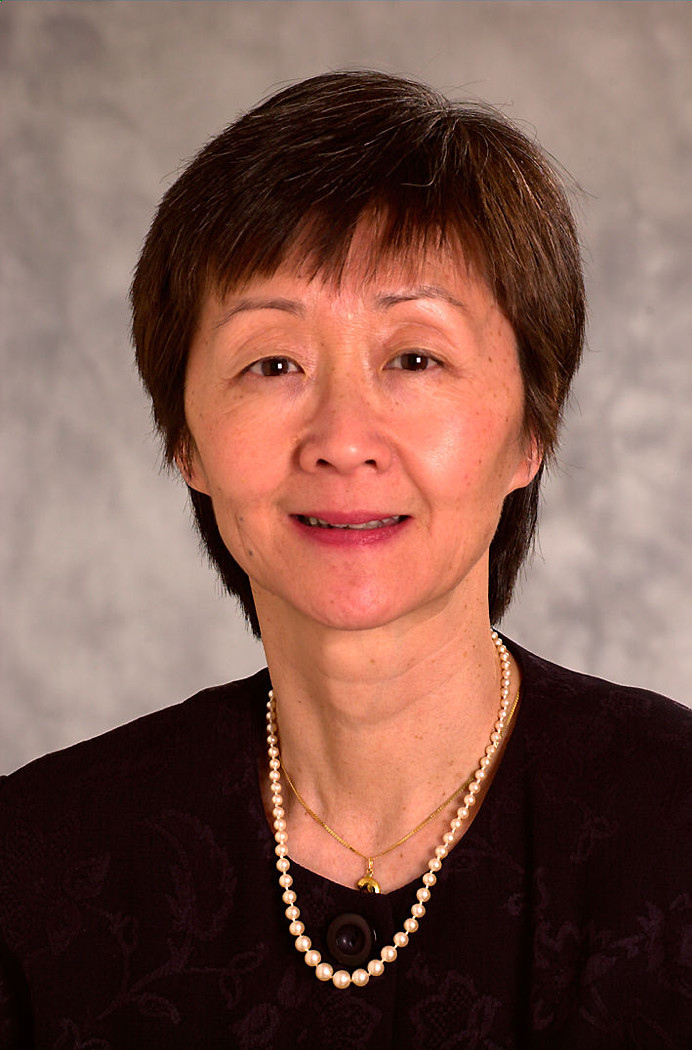
- Hoy in 2002

Toronto City Manager (formerly Chief Administrative Officer)
- In office 2001–2008
- Preceded by: Mike Garrett
- Succeeded by: Joe Pennachetti

Personal details
- Education: Queen's University, MPA; University of Toronto, MSW

Shirley Hoy (born 1951) is a Canadian public servant who was the city manager for the City of Toronto from 2001 to 2008. She was CEO of the Toronto Lands Corporation (a wholly owned subsidiary of the Toronto District School Board) from 2009 to 2014.

== Background ==
The daughter of Chinese immigrants to Canada, Shirley Hoy has distinguished herself as a top bureaucrat in the city of Toronto. Her high school was completed at Lawrence Park Collegiate Institute, after which she went on to earn a master's degree in public administration from Queen's University, and a master's degree in Social Work (Social Policy) from the University of Toronto.

== Career ==
Prior to her becoming the chief administrative officer (CAO) of the City of Toronto, she held positions such as Director of Policy and Planning for the Community Services department; General Manager of Administration for Exhibition Place; and Executive Director for the Metro Chairman's Office.

She worked in the provincial government between 1991 and 1995, at the end of which she was appointed to the post of "Commissioner of the Community and Neighbourhood Services" in January, 1996.

Originally appointed as the Acting CAO of Toronto, she was bestowed with the official title on November 6, 2001. During the City's corporate restructuring in late 2004, her title was changed to City Manager, however, her job remained essentially the same.

On July 28, 2008, after serving almost seven years as Toronto's City Manager, Hoy tendered her resignation, effective October 6, 2008. In her letter of resignation, Hoy cited her intention to continue working in the health and social services sector.

In 2016, Hoy was acclaimed as the Chair of the Governing Council of the University of Toronto until 2017.

She was married to Gordon Chong until his death in 2018.
