= John A. Tory =

Canadian lawyer (1930–2011)

John A. Tory QC
- Born: John Arnold Tory; March 7, 1930; Toronto, Ontario, Canada
- Died: April 3, 2011 (aged 81); North Palm Beach, Florida, U.S.
- Resting place: Mount Pleasant Cemetery
- Education: University of Toronto; University of Toronto Law School; Osgoode Hall Law School
- Occupations: Lawyer; corporate executive
- Spouse: Elizabeth Bacon (m. 1953)
- Children: 4 (including John Tory)
- Parents: John S. D. Tory (father); Kathreen Jean Arnold (mother)
- Relatives: James Marshall Tory (brother)
- Family: Tory family

John Arnold Tory QC (March 7, 1930 – April 3, 2011) was a Canadian lawyer and corporate executive.

== Early life and education ==
Tory was born in Toronto, Ontario, to Kathreen Jean Arnold Tory (née Arnold) and John S. D. Tory, a lawyer who founded Torys. He had an older sister, Virginia, and a fraternal twin brother, James Marshall Tory.

Tory, along with his brother, James, graduated from the University of Toronto Schools in 1946 at the age of 16. Their father sent them to Phillips Academy Andover, where they studied for two years before enrolling at the University of Toronto. They were undergraduate students for two years before they switched streams to attend the University of Toronto Faculty of Law in 1949. They graduated in 1952 and completed two years of additional training at Osgoode Hall, and with his brother, they joined their father’s firm at the age of 24.

== Career ==
Together with his twin brother James Marshall Tory, he entered the practice of law in 1953, later founding the firm of Tory, Tory, Deslauriers (now Torys LLP) and was appointed a Queen's Counsel in 1965.

After successfully guiding the build-up of Torys, John ceased practising law in 1974. He began working full-time for the Thomson family, first under founder Roy Thomson and then, following Roy's death in 1976, for his son Kenneth. Eventually, by the late 1970s, he became President of the family's principal holding company, The Woodbridge Company Limited. Until his death he was the president of Thomson Investments Limited. John was a friend and financial advisor of the late media magnate Kenneth Thomson for fifty years and continued until his death to serve on the board of Thomson Reuters, company formed by the merger of Thomson Corporation with international news service Reuters. The Globe and Mail described him as the "sage consigliere to the Thomson family."

He was a close friend of the late media magnate Ted Rogers and served on the board of directors of Rogers Communications since 1979.

Tory was also a friend to Joseph S. Atkinson, Toronto Star publisher. Despite their political positions (Tory had ties to Conservatives and Atkinson with the Liberal Party). Atkinson appointed Tory and his brother James, to be Executors of his Will along with five others.

== Personal life ==
Tory married Elizabeth (Liz) Bacon, a nurse, on May 15, 1953. They had four children: John H. Tory (born 1954), Jennifer (born 1955), Jeffrey (born 1960) and Michael (born 1961). His son, John Tory, is the former mayor of Toronto and former Progressive Conservative Party of Ontario leader.

Elizabeth's mother, Helen Yvonne Solomon, was born in 1909 to a Russian Jewish family that had emigrated to Canada six years earlier and settled in Toronto. Her father, Howard English Bacon, was a member of the Anglican Church of Canada and she was raised a Christian.

== Death ==
Tory suffered a stroke on April 1, 2011, while at his Florida home and died on April 3, 2011, at the age of 81.
