= Toronto Seniors Services and Long-Term Care Division =

Seniors Services and Long-Term Care
- Municipal wordmark

Agency overview
- Jurisdiction: City of Toronto
- Employees: 2,435 (2020)
- Annual budget: $271.191 million (2020)
- Agency executive: Paul Raftis, General Manager
- Website: Official website

Seniors Services and Long-Term Care is a division of the City of Toronto. It is the lead division in integrating services for seniors across the municipal government, and it operates the 10 City-owned long-term care homes in Toronto. It assumed responsibility for publicly-run home care facilities for the elderly from the former Toronto Community Services department.

== Funding ==
As a division of the City of Toronto, its annual funding level is established by a vote of Toronto City Council. In 2020, Council approved a budget of $271.191 million gross and $47.953 million net, with a staff complement of 2,435.2 positions.

== Facilities ==
- Cummer Lodge
- Bendale
- Kipling
- Carefree Lodge
- True Davidson Acres
- Bendale
- Seven Oaks
- Fudger House
- Castleview Wychwood Towers
- Westburn Manor
