= Paul Johnson (civil servant) =

Canadian civil servant

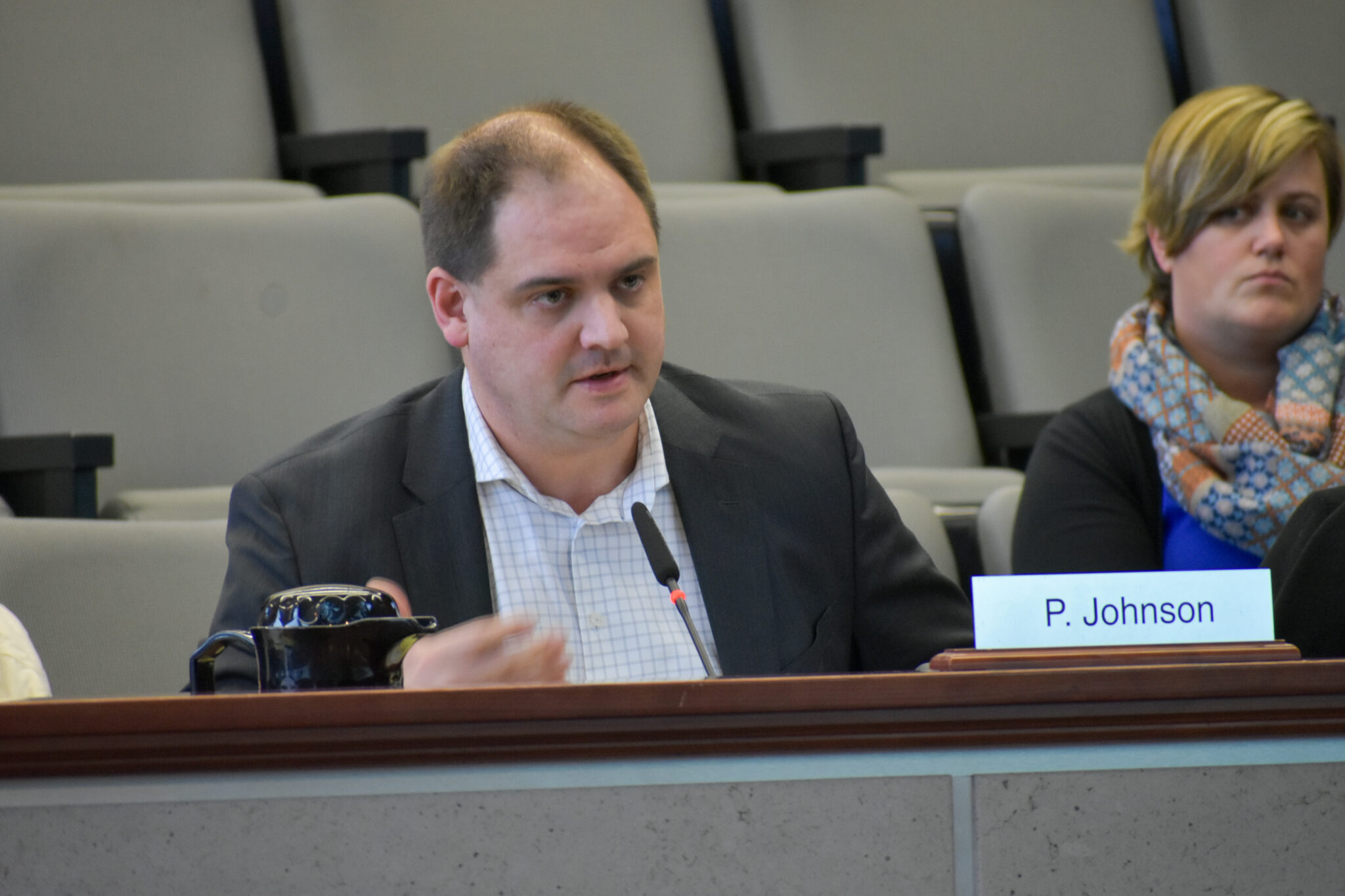
- Johnson in 2018

Toronto City Manager
- Incumbent
- Assumed office December 2, 2022
- Appointed by: John Tory
- Preceded by: Chris Murray; Tracey Cook (interim)

Personal details
- Education: McMaster University (B.A.)
- Profession: Civil servant

Paul Johnson is a Canadian civil servant who has been the city manager for the City of Toronto since December 2, 2022.

== Background and education ==
Born and raised in Hamilton, Ontario, Johnson earned a Bachelor of Arts (BA) in history from McMaster University and completed the Community Shift Leadership Program from Ivey Business School at Western University in London, Ontario.

== Career ==
Johnson began his career in the non-profit sector, where he worked on homelessness and poverty reduction initiatives. He joined Wesley Urban Ministries in 1995, where he would work for 15 years, including 10 years as executive director.

=== City of Hamilton ===
In 2010, Johnson was recruited to join the City of Hamilton by City Manager Chris Murray, where he would work in a number of roles including as the director of neighbourhood and community initiatives, the city's corporate initiatives, the light rail transit (LRT) project, eventually becoming the general manager of healthy and safe communities.

==== COVID-19 ====
During the COVID-19 pandemic in Ontario, Johnson served as Hamilton's emergency operations centre director, where he managed the city's response to the COVID-19 pandemic along with medical officer of health Dr. Elizabeth Richardson. In 2020, Johnson and Richardson were named Hamilton's citizen of the year.

=== City of Toronto ===
Johnson left Hamilton in 2021 to become the City of Toronto's deputy city manager for community and social services on September 7. In Toronto, Johnson worked on housing issues such as the Tenants First program, and creating the Toronto Seniors Housing Corporation. He also oversaw the launch of the Toronto Community Crisis Service, a non-police based crisis intervention pilot program, and worked on the city’s bid to co-host the 2026 FIFA World Cup.

On December 2, 2022, Mayor John Tory announced that Johnson was selected to become Toronto's city manager. Since Chris Murray stepped down on August 19, the role of city manager had been vacant, with deputy city manager Tracy Cook acting in the role until Johnson's appointment. Johnson's appointment was one of the first uses of the new strong mayor powers granted to the mayor of Toronto following the 2022 election.

== Personal life ==
Johnson referees basketball and is a NOCP evaluator and instructor.
