= John Troy =

John Troy may refer to:

- John Troy (Australian politician) (born 1941), doctor and member of the Western Australian Legislative Assembly, 1977–1980
- John Troy (bishop) (1739–1823), Roman Catholic Archbishop of Dublin
- John Troy (hurler) (born 1971), Offaly GAA hurler and all-star
- John Weir Troy (1868–1942), American Democratic politician, Governor of Alaska Territory, 1933–1939
- Jack Troy (1927–1995), Australian rugby league player

== See also ==
- John Tory (disambiguation)
