= Toronto City Manager =

Senior civil servant in Toronto

- Municipal logo

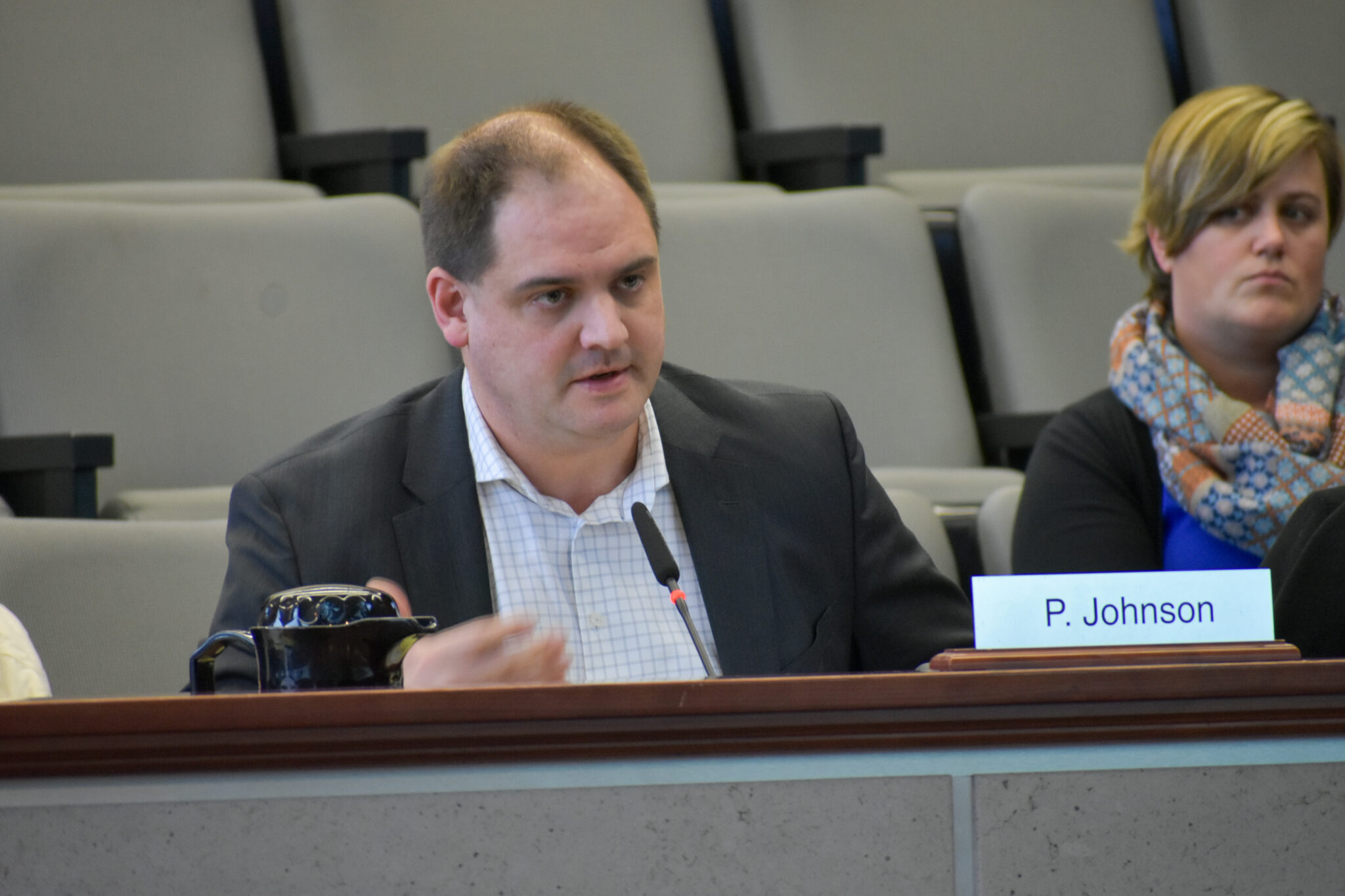
- Incumbent; Paul Johnson since December 2, 2022
- City of Toronto
- Reports to: Toronto City Council
- Seat: Toronto City Hall
- Appointer: Mayor of Toronto; Currently delegated to Toronto City Council
- Constituting instrument: City of Toronto Act, 2006; Toronto Municipal Code Chapter 169, Officials, City
- Precursor: Chief Administrative Officer
- Inaugural holder: Shirley Hoy
- Formation: April 15, 2005
- Deputy: Deputy city managers and chief financial officer
- Website: www.toronto.ca/city-managers-office/

The Toronto city manager is the most senior civil servant in the City of Toronto's administrative structure and the head of the Toronto Public Service. Appointed by the mayor of Toronto, the city manager is responsible for providing advice to Toronto City Council and implementing its decisions. The position is statutorily known as the chief administrative officer (CAO), which was also the title used in Toronto until city manager was adopted in 2005.

Paul Johnson has been the city manager since December 2, 2022. Johnson was appointed by Mayor John Tory, and previously worked for the City of Hamilton, before joining the City of Toronto as a deputy city manager in 2021.

== Overview of role ==
Under the City of Toronto Act, the city may appoint a city manager, who is delegated managerial authority to direct the operation of the municipal government, manage its staff, and develop policy and budgetary recommendations for City Council to consider. The city manager reports to City Council and is appointed (or can be dismissed) by the mayor, who is head of council and the city's statutory chief executive officer. This role is common in the council-manager system used across Ontario municipalities.

A mayoral decision issued in 2023 delegates the power to hire and fire the city manager to City Council, the power to hire and dismiss department heads to the city manager, and the power to determine the city's organizational structure to the city manager.

== History ==
=== Evolving role in former municipalities ===
==== Departmental model ====
The department model was once the most popular administrative management model, before falling out of favour with Canadian municipalities in the 1970s. In this model, each department and its head report directly to city council. Decision-making was decentralized, with a noted weakness being little opportunity for internal coordination to align on initiatives on a corporate level.

==== Centralization in the 1970s ====
In the mid-1970s, there was a push for centralization. Two models – the chief administrative officer model and the city manager model – were common. Under the CAO model, the heads of most "line departments" (Works, Transportation, etc.) reported directly to city council, except for heads of administrative departments who reported to the CAO. The city manager model saw department heads reporting to a single official hired by council. The City of York, City of Etobicoke and City of Scarborough each had a city manager. The Borough of East York and the Municipality of Metropolitan Toronto had chief administrative officers, and the City of North York had a city administrator. Uniquely, the City of Toronto introduced a Board of Management.

==== Toronto Board of Management (1996–97) ====
The City of Toronto was the last major Canadian city to use the departmental model. It had initially attempted to introduce reforms in the early 1970s by introducing a "committee of heads", where senior staff selected an internal committee chair. As the chair did not have the authority to direct the other heads, the committee could not enforce cooperation or a corporate perspective on departments.

In 1996, city council adopted the Board of Management. Under this model, the heads of four service areas – known as commissioners – shared the powers of a CAO or city manager. This blended the departmental model and the CAO/city manager models. While each commissioner was appointed to head a service area which housed a cluster of departments, the board could direct all service areas and their departments. members were appointed as equals, decisions were made by consensus, and commissioners shared the same staff and office.

=== Chief Administrative Officer (1998–2004) ===
Following amalgamation in 1998, the new "megacity" adopted the model used by Metro Toronto and most of its former municipalities. The senior civil servant in the City of Toronto was known as the chief administrative officer, who reported directly to council and oversees each department head. Mike Garrett was appointed as the city's first CAO. In June 2001, he was replaced as CAO by Shirley Hoy.

=== City Manager (2004–present) ===
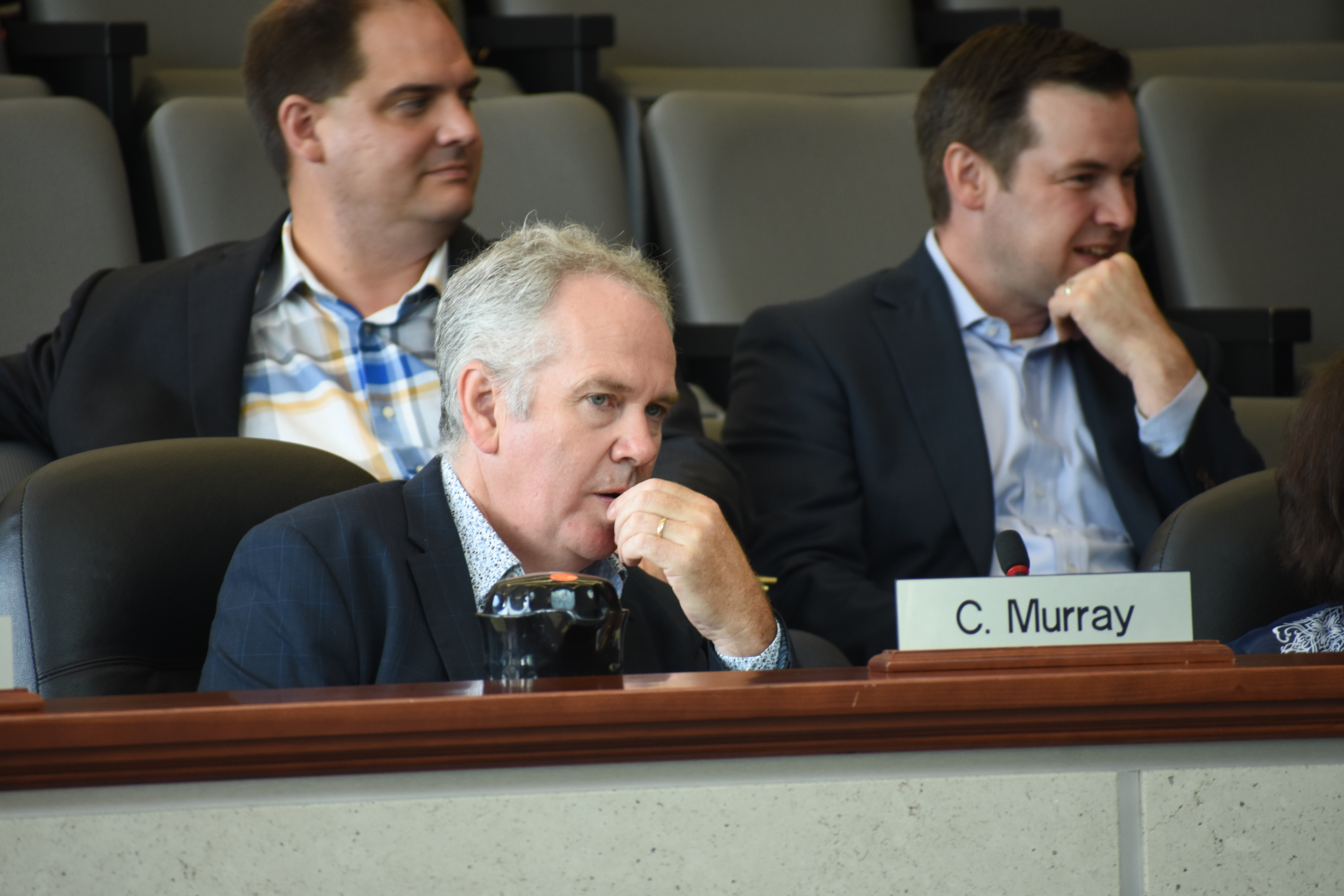
Former and current city managers Chris Murray (2018–2022) and Paul Johnson (2022–present) pictured in 2017. Both city managers previously worked for the City of Hamilton.

In 2004, following a review of the city's organizational structure, City Council endorsed a plan to rename the position of CAO to city manager, with its responsibilities largely remaining the same. The new title was formally implemented when a by-law was passed on April 14, 2005, giving effect to the change the following day.

In 2022, the Legislative Assembly of Ontario passed the Strong Mayors, Building Homes Act, 2022, which gave the mayor greater powers over municipal administration. This includes the ability to appoint and terminate executive staff such as the city manager, however, the city manager remains accountable to city council as a whole rather than directly to the mayor. Certain powers of the mayor, such as the ability to hire and dismiss the city manager, are delegated to City Council. Additionally, the mayor's power to determine the organizational structure of the city and hire or dismiss department heads are delegated to the city manager.

== Deputy city managers ==
The city manager is supported by five deputy city managers and a chief financial officer. Deputy city managers report to the city manager and assist in administrative governance and oversight activities. The deputy city manager position was introduced in 2004, as a result of the same review which changed the CAO to city manager. The role introduced a clustering approach for management oversight of the city's various divisions, eliminating the role of commissioners and introducing deputy city managers. Rather than a direct operational or program advocacy role as former commissioners had done, deputy city managers oversee a cluster of divisions (led by general managers and executive directors), ensuring horizontal integration and strategic alignment in their operations and budget, as well as performance management.

=== Current deputy city managers ===
Cluster	Name	Start date
Community Development and Social Services	Denise Andrea Campbell	April 22, 2025
Development and Growth Services	Jag Sharma	August 14, 2023
Community and Emergency Services	Kate Bassil	April 22, 2025
Infrastructure Services	David Jollimore (acting)	April 3, 2026
Corporate Services	Sonia Brar (acting)	April 3, 2026
Corporate Services	David Jollimore	December 18, 2023
Chief Financial Officer and Treasurer	Stephen Conforti	November 13, 2023

== List of city managers ==
Since the amalgamation in 1998, Toronto has had two chief administrative officers, with Shirley Hoy becoming the city's first city manager in 2004. In total, the city has had five city managers who were not temporary appointments.

No.	Portrait	Name	Start date	End date	Appointed by	Mayor	Notes
Chief Administrative Officer
–		Mike Garrett	January 6, 1998	June 27, 2001	City Council	Mel Lastman	Garrett was the city's first chief administrative officer, a role renamed to city manager following his tenure.
–		Shirley Hoy	June 27, 2001	April 15, 2005	City Council	Mel Lastman David Miller	Hoy became acting chief administrative officer on June 27, 2001, and was formally appointed to the role on November 6, 2001.
City Manager
1		Shirley Hoy	April 15, 2005	October 6, 2008	City Council	David Miller	Hoy became the first city manager when by-law 318-2005 was enacted, renaming the CAO role and reappointing her to the position.
2		Joe Pennachetti	October 6, 2008	May 9, 2015	City Council	David Miller Rob Ford John Tory	
3		Peter Wallace	July 13, 2015	April 3, 2018	City Council	John Tory	
–		Giuliana Carbone	April 3, 2018	August 13, 2018	City Council	John Tory	Interim city manager following the resignation of Peter Wallace.
4		Chris Murray	August 13, 2018	August 19, 2022	City Council	John Tory	
–		Tracey Cook	August 20, 2022	December 2, 2022	City Council	John Tory	Interim city manager following the resignation of Chris Murray.
5		Paul Johnson	December 2, 2022	Incumbent	Mayor	John Tory Olivia Chow	Johnson's appointment by Mayor John Tory was the first time the "strong-mayor" powers were used to appoint a city manager.
