= Ride Don't Hide =

Annual charity event in Canada

- Formation: 2009
- Type: Charity
- Purpose: To create awareness and defeat the stigma surrounding mental illness.
- Founder: Michael Schratter

Ride Don't Hide is an annual charity event organized by the Canadian Mental Health Association to raise awareness for, and ultimately defeat, the stigma surrounding mental illness. The event was called the Community Bike Ride in 2009, the ride eventually became Ride Don't Hide in 2012 after Michael Schratter started a ride event called Ride Don't Hide. In his ride, Schratter cycled 40,000 kilometers over 469 days, raising nearly $70,000 to raise awareness for, and ultimately defeat, the stigma surrounding mental illness. Proceeds from the ride go towards Canadian Mental Health Association's efforts in promoting mental well-being, with emphasis on women and their families.

== History ==
The Community Bike Ride in its inaugural ride in 2009 saw 39 riders take part. Building on the momentum spearheaded by Michael Schratter's highly publicized Ride Don't Hide bike ride, which garnered national media attention, the Community Bike Ride became Ride Don't Hide in 2012 with roughly 400 participants.

In 2013, Ride Don't Hide expanded province wide, with 13 communities taking part, with 2,200 participants, raising over $400,000 for various mental health programs.

The ride is set to eventually become a national event.
