= Toronto Community Crisis Service =

- Abbreviation: TCCS
- Purpose: Mental health crisis response
- Executive director: Mohamed Shuriye (acting)
- Parent organization: City of Toronto – Social Development Division
- Website: www.toronto.ca/toronto-community-crisis-service/

The Toronto Community Crisis Service (TCCS) is the mobile crisis intervention program operated by the City of Toronto. The service provides a non-police-led response to mental health crisis calls and wellness checks for residents over the age of 16. It is integrated with the local 2-1-1 and 9-1-1 call centres, and has been described as "Toronto’s fourth emergency service".

== History ==
=== Early discussions and planning ===
In 2020, in response to calls for police reform following the murder of George Floyd in the United States and a series of similar incidents in Toronto such as the death of Regis Korchinski-Paquet, Toronto City Council considered a series of motions aimed at reforming policing and crisis response in the city. Mayor John Tory tabled a motion to "detask" the Toronto Police Service. The city would explore how duties currently assigned to sworn officers would be assumed by "alternative models of community safety response" to incidents where neither violence nor weapons are at issue. Tory's motion passed unanimously on June 29.

City staff presented a report to the Executive Committee on January 27, 2021, which recommended the creation of a community crisis support service pilot program. The Executive Committee endorsed the report and it was later adopted by Toronto City Council on February 2. City council gave the Social Development, Finance and Administration Division (SDFA) the remainder of the year to develop the non-police crisis response pilot.

Denise Campbell, the division's executive director indicated in April that some issues her team were considering included integration with 9-1-1 and 2-1-1 call centres, consultation with community and police, and the mandate of the program itself. A point of contention was the language of the program, whether it is non-emergency or crisis. According to Campbell, despite the word non-emergency, the goal is that the program would be able to respond to calls as fast as an ambulance. As a pilot project, the division aimed to target specific communities most at need. Three of the services areas were divided geographically, another pilot program was creating a team aimed at serving Indigenous communities. The program was projected to cost the city between $7.2 million to $7.9 million to operate each year.

=== Pilot project ===
On January 26, 2022, the Executive Committee approved SDFA's report outlining an implementation plan for the pilot program. It was subsequently adopted by city council on February 2. The first pilot was set to begin operating in the downtown east and northeast areas by March. Another pilot in the northwest as well as the Indigenous initiative in the downtown west was planned to begin operating in June. The community agencies chosen by the city were TAIBU Community Health Centre, the Gerstein Crisis Centre, the Canadian Mental Health Association, ENAGB Indigenous Youth Agency and the 2-Spirited People of the 1st Nations. According to Mayor Tory, "the pilots will allow the city to test and to evaluate and to revise this model before we implement it on a larger scale but make no mistake it is our intention to implement it on a larger scale and to have it city-wide by 2025 at the latest".

The first pilot in the downtown east launched on March 31, 2022, the northeast pilot launched on April 4, and the northwest and downtown west pilots launched in July.

In January 2023, a six month evaluation report conducted between March 31 to September 30, 2022, by the Centre for Addiction and Mental Health (CAMH) found that the program had managed to resolve 78 per cent of 1,530 calls received from 9-1-1 without police involvement. The report was received positively by city officials, with Campbell indicating her division would recommend a city-wide rollout to city council in October. In a statement, Mayor John Tory described the program as a "success", and called on the Ontario and federal governments to make investments in mental health.

=== Program launch ===
In October 2023, city staff presented a report to the Executive Committee recommending that the pilot program be made permanent and expanded city wide. According to the report, TCCS received 6,827 calls for service during its first year of operation, with 78 per cent of calls transferred from 9-1-1 having been successfully resolved without police involvement. The approved $13.7 million budget in 2023 would increase to $26.8 million the following year to accommodate the expanded service. The staff recommendations were adopted by the Executive Committee on October 31. Mayor Olivia Chow expressed her support in a statement, describing TCCS as the "fourth municipal emergency response service", noting that it has "successfully established itself as a trusted crisis response option for Torontonians" and has "strengthened confidence in community safety efforts and led to better outcomes for Indigenous, Black, racialized and 2SLGBTQ+ communities". In November 2023, Toronto City Council voted unanimously to endorse the expansion of the service.

The program was launched city-wide by Mayor Chow on September 26, 2024. The service will operate with 12 mobile teams of two crisis workers, with the targeted average response time being 25 minutes.

== Agencies and former pilot areas ==
The TCCS now operates city-wide. Previously, four agencies each serviced a pilot area.

=== Downtown East ===
The downtown east pilot includes TPS 51 and 52 divisions. Its boundaries are:

- North: Bloor Street to the Prince Edward Viaduct
- East: Don River to Lake Shore Boulevard to the Don Roadway
- South: Lake Ontario
- West: Spadina Avenue

The agency responsible for this pilot area is the Gerstein Crisis Centre.

=== Downtown West ===
The downtown west pilot overlaps with TPS 14 division. Its boundaries are:

- North: Canadian Pacific Railway line
- East: Spadina Avenue and Lower Spadina Avenue
- South: Lake Ontario
- West: Dufferin Street south to Queen Street, west to Roncesvalles Avenue, south from Roncesvalles Avenue to Lake Ontario

The agency responsible is 2-Spirited People of the 1st Nations and ENAGB Indigenous Youth Agency. This pilot area focuses on the Indigenous community.

=== Northeast ===
The northeast pilot encompasses most of Scarborough, and TPS 41, 42 and 43 divisions. Its boundaries are:

- North: Steeles Avenue
- East: City of Pickering border Little Rouge River, Rouge River
- South: Highway 401 west to Brimley Road, south from Brimley Road to Lake Ontario
- West: Victoria Park Avenue

The agency responsible for the pilot area is the TAIBU Community Health Centre.

=== Northwest ===
The northwest pilot encompasses TPS 23 and 31 divisions. Its boundaries are:

- North: Steeles Avenue
- East: Canadian National Railway Line south to Highway 401, east to the Humber River
- South: Highway 401 east to the Humber River and south to Eglinton Avenue
- West: Highway 427

The agency responsible is the Canadian Mental Health Association.
