= James Marshall Tory =

Canadian lawyer (1930–2011)

- Born: James Marshall Tory; March 7, 1930; Toronto, Ontario, Canada
- Died: August 19, 2013 (aged 83); Guysborough, Nova Scotia, Canada
- Education: University of Toronto; University of Toronto Faculty of Law
- Occupation: Lawyer
- Spouse: Marilyn Yorath (died 1999)
- Children: 5
- Parents: John S. D. Tory (father); Kathreen Jean Arnold (mother)
- Relatives: John A. Tory (brother); John Tory (nephew)
- Family: Tory family

James Marshall Tory (March 7, 1930 – August 19, 2013) was a Canadian corporate lawyer based in Toronto and twin brother to the late John A. Tory.

== Early life and education ==
Tory was born in Toronto, Ontario, to John S. D. Tory, a lawyer, and Jean Tory (née Arnold). He had an older sister, Virginia, and a fraternal twin brother, John Arnold Tory.

Tory and his brother, John, graduated from the University of Toronto Schools in 1946 at the age of 16. They attended Phillips Academy Andover for two years before enrolling at the University of Toronto. Tory was an undergraduate student for two years before he switched streams to attend the University of Toronto Faculty of Law in 1949. He graduated in 1952, where he was the Gold Medallist in its first graduating class. Tory completed two years of additional training at Osgoode Hall, and with his brother, they joined their father’s firm at the age of 24.

== Career ==
Tory and his brother John were members of the firm of Torys, founded by their father John Stewart Donald Tory. He was admitted to the Ontario Bar in 1954, when he joined the family firm Torys. Prior to his passing, he was Chair Emeritus and Senior Counsel of Torys.

He was active on community boards and served as chairman of the board of the Hospital for Sick Children and of the Hospital for Sick Children Foundation.

== Personal life ==
Tory was married to Marilyn Tory (née Yorath), whom he met at the University of Toronto. They had five children Marilyn died in 1999; their son, David, died of brain cancer in 2006.:

- Martha Tory is a retired EY partner
- James C. Tory (Jim Tory Jr.) is a retired litigation lawyer
- Suzanne Tory
- David Thomas Tory
- Richard Tory is an executive with Morgan Stanley Canada
