= John S. D. Tory =

Canadian lawyer (1903–1965)

John S. D. Tory Q.C. O.B.E
- Born: John Stewart Donald Tory; 1903; Toronto, Ontario, Canada
- Died: August 28, 1965 (aged 61–62)
- Education: Osgoode Hall Law School (LL.B.); Harvard Law School (S.J.D.)
- Occupation: Lawyer
- Known for: Founder of Torys
- Spouses: Jean Arnold (m. 1929-1957); Ann Cowan (m. 1957-1965)
- Children: Virginia Tory; John A. Tory; James Marshall Tory
- Relatives: James Cranswick Tory (Uncle); Henry Marshall Tory (Uncle); John Tory (Grandson)
- Family: Tory family
- Honours: Order of the British Empire; Queen's Counsel

John Stewart Donald Tory (1903 – August 28, 1965) was a Canadian lawyer and founder of the law firm Torys, based in Toronto, Ontario. He was also a director of aircraft manufacturer A.V. Roe (later Avro). He was made Queen's Counsel and an Officer of the Order of the British Empire.

== Early life ==
Tory was born in Toronto to John Alexander Tory Sr. (1869–1950) and Abigail Georgina Buckley (1875–1961). Tory's father was the youngest of three prominent brothers, alongside James Cranswick Tory and Henry Marshall Tory. He was a company director who became the head of the Ontario division of Sun Life Assurance Company.

Tory's 2nd great-grandfather, James Tory, was a soldier in the 71st Scottish Regiment. He was captured during the American Revolution and held as a prisoner of war. He later settled in Nova Scotia during the 1780s.

J.S.D. Tory attended Upper Canada College and the University of Toronto Schools. He graduated from Osgoode Hall Law School at the top of his class, and he earned a SJD degree from Harvard University.

== Career ==
Tory was called to the Ontario bar and later worked at the W. N. Tilley law firm in Toronto for a few years. He was made King's Counsel in 1938, and in 1941 started his own firm (now known as Torys LLP) with a focus on corporate law.

Following the outbreak of World War II In 1939, Tory was asked to serve as chairman of the Citizens Committee for Troops in Training.

On 1 July 1946, Tory was made an Officer of the Order of the British Empire, alongside hundreds of other Canadians inducted into the order on the first Dominion Day following the war. He was specifically cited for his work as Chairman of the Citizen's War Services Committee.

On the 28 December 1946 he was appointed a director of Simpsons Ltd.

He was also a director of A.V. Roe Canada. Before his death, Tory was director at numerous companies including Porcupine McIntyre Mining Ltd, Slough Estates Ltd (Canada), and Thomson Newspapers. A literary award at the University of Toronto was named in his honour.

== Personal life ==
Tory married Jean Arnold. They had three children – daughter Virginia, and fraternal twin sons John A. Tory and James Marshall Tory. His grandson is John Tory, former mayor of Toronto, Progressive Conservative Party of Ontario leader and member of his grandfather's firm. Tory and Arnold separated when their children were in their twenties.
