= Torys =

Canadian law firm

Torys LLP
- Headquarters: Toronto, Ontario, Canada
- No. of offices: 6
- No. of lawyers: 360+ (2019)
- Key people: Matt Cockburn (Managing Partner)
- Date founded: 1941
- Founder: John Stewart Donald Tory
- Company type: Limited liability partnership
- Website: www.torys.com

Torys LLP is a Canadian international corporate law firm with offices in Toronto, Calgary, New York, Montreal, Vancouver and Halifax. The firm acts for a wide range of commercial clients and financial institutions in Canada, the United States, and globally.

== History ==
The firm was founded in 1941 by Toronto business lawyer John Stewart Donald Tory.

In the 1960s the firm was renamed Tory Tory DesLauriers & Binnington.

In 2000, it merged with New York law firm Haythe & Curley and was briefly known as Tory Haythe before being rebranded to Torys LLP.

Torys became a national firm with the opening of a Calgary office in 2011 and a Montreal office in 2013.

The firm is one of the Seven Sisters, a group of seven prominent Canadian business law firms.

== Notable lawyers ==
- John Tory, 65th and former Mayor of Toronto, former leader of the Progressive Conservative Party of Ontario, grandson of founder John S. D. Tory
- J. Robert S. Prichard, Former Chairman of the Bank of Montreal
- Anita Anand, Member of Parliament in the House of Commons of Canada
- Frank Iacobucci, former puisne justice of the Supreme Court of Canada
- John B. Laskin, justice of the Federal Court of Appeal
- Robert P. Armstrong, former Justice of the Court of Appeal for Ontario
- Bill Davis, former Premier of Ontario
