= John Tory =

Canadian politician (born 1954)

John Tory OOnt KC
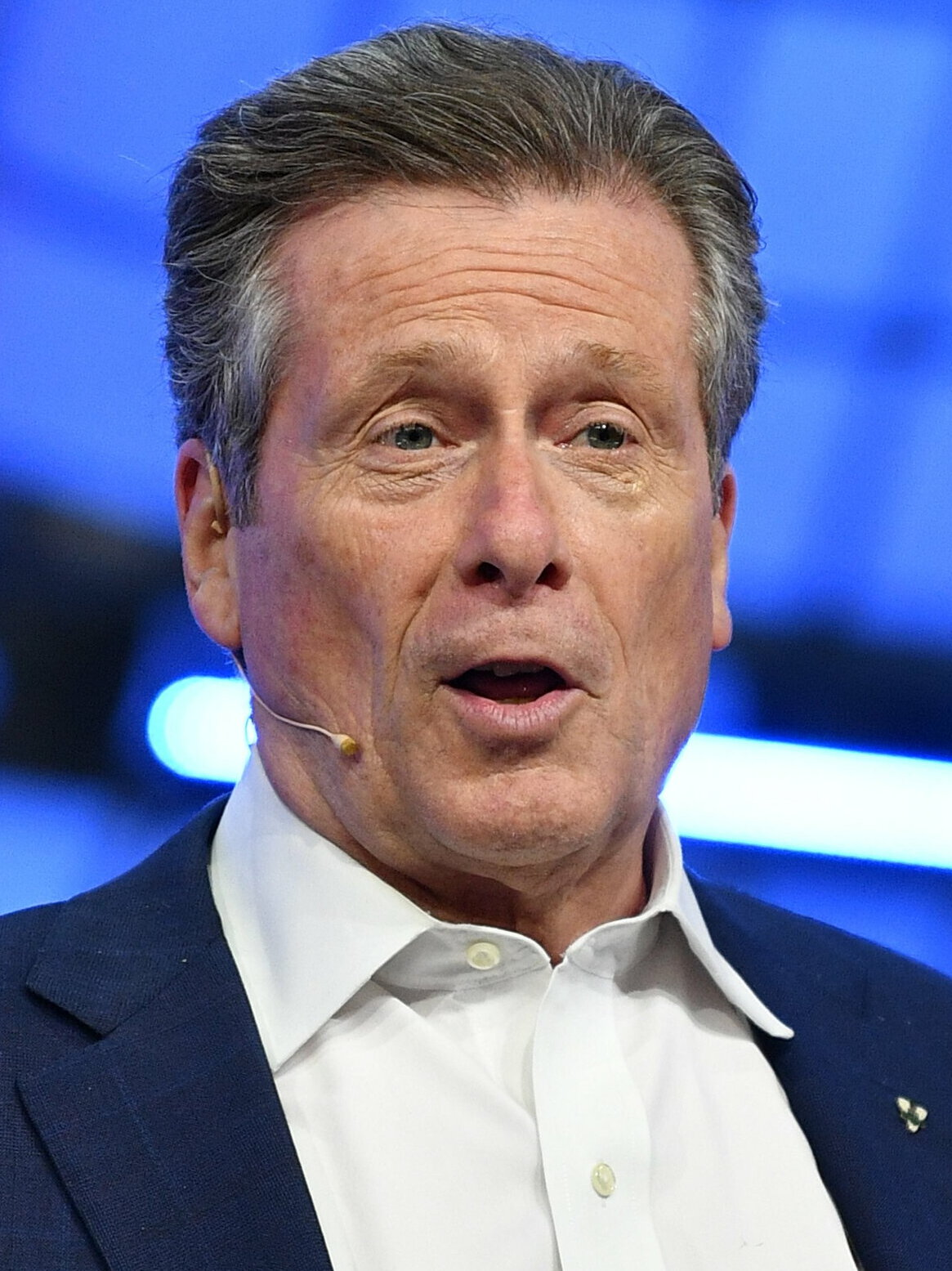
- Tory in 2022

65th Mayor of Toronto
- In office December 1, 2014 – February 17, 2023
- Deputy: Denzil Minnan-Wong; Jennifer McKelvie
- Preceded by: Rob Ford
- Succeeded by: Olivia Chow

Leader of the Official Opposition in Ontario
- In office March 29, 2005 – October 10, 2007
- Preceded by: Bob Runciman
- Succeeded by: Bob Runciman
Further information
Leader of the Progressive Conservative Party of Ontario
In office September 28, 2004 – March 20, 2009
Preceded by	Ernie Eves
Succeeded by	Bob Runciman (interim)
Member of the Ontario Provincial Parliament for Dufferin—Peel—Wellington—Grey
In office March 29, 2005 – October 10, 2007
Preceded by	Ernie Eves
Succeeded by	Sylvia Jones
9th Commissioner of the CFL
In office 1997–2000
Preceded by	Larry Smith
Succeeded by	Michael Lysko

Personal details
- Born: John Howard Tory; May 28, 1954 (age 72) Toronto, Ontario, Canada
- Party: Independent (Note: In Ontario, municipal politicians are elected on a non-partisan basis.)
- Other political affiliations: Ontario Progressive Conservative (provincial); Progressive Conservative (federal, until 1995)
- Spouse: Barbara Hackett (m. 1978)
- Children: 4
- Parents: John A. Tory (father); Elizabeth Bacon (mother)
- Relatives: John S. D. Tory (grandfather); James Marshall Tory (uncle)
- Education: University of Toronto (BA); Osgoode Hall Law School (LLB)
- Occupation: Politician; lawyer; businessman

John Howard Tory (born May 28, 1954) is a Canadian lawyer, broadcaster, businessman, and former politician who served as the 65th mayor of Toronto from 2014 to 2023. He led the Progressive Conservative Party of Ontario from 2004 to 2009 and was Leader of the Official Opposition from 2005 to 2007. Outside politics, Tory served as the 9th Commissioner of the CFL from 1997 to 2000 and has worked for Rogers Communications.

After a career as a lawyer, political strategist and businessman, Tory ran as a mayoral candidate in the 2003 Toronto municipal election but lost to David Miller. Tory was elected as Ontario PC leader in 2004 and was a member of the Legislative Assembly of Ontario, representing Dufferin—Peel—Wellington—Grey. He served as the leader of the Official Opposition from 2005 to 2007. After his resignation as PC leader in 2009, Tory became a radio talk show host on CFRB. Despite widespread speculation, Tory did not run for mayor in 2010. He was the volunteer chair of the non-profit group CivicAction from 2010 to 2014.

On October 27, 2014, Tory was elected mayor of Toronto, defeating incumbent mayor Rob Ford's brother, councillor Doug Ford, and former councillor and member of Parliament (MP) Olivia Chow. On October 22, 2018, he was re-elected mayor of Toronto in the 2018 mayoral election, defeating former chief city planner Jennifer Keesmaat. He was elected to a third term as mayor on October 24, 2022, after defeating urbanist Gil Penalosa. He announced his intention to imminently resign as mayor on February 10, 2023, after admitting to having an affair with a staffer during the COVID-19 pandemic. He submitted his resignation letter to the city clerk on February 15, and he formally left office on February 17, at 5 p.m. Tory was succeeded as mayor by Olivia Chow.

== Early life and education ==
John Howard Tory, the eldest of four, was born on May 28, 1954, in Toronto, Ontario, to Elizabeth (née Bacon) and John A. Tory, president of Thomson Investments Limited and a director of Rogers Communications. His grandfather was lawyer John S. D. Tory and his great-grandfather founded Sun Life of Canada.

He attended the University of Toronto Schools, at the time a publicly funded high school. He received his Bachelor of Arts degree in political science from Trinity College at the University of Toronto in 1975. He received his Bachelor of Laws degree in 1978 from Osgoode Hall Law School of York University. He was called to the bar in Ontario in 1980.

== Business and early political career ==
From 1972 to 1979, Tory was hired by family friend Ted Rogers as a journalist for Rogers Broadcasting's Toronto radio stations CFTR and CHFI. From 1980 to 1981, and later from 1986 to 1995, Tory held various positions at Tory, Tory, DesLauriers & Binnington including partner, managing partner, and member of the Executive Committee.

From 1981 to 1985, Tory served in the office of the premier of Ontario, Bill Davis, as principal secretary to the premier and associate secretary of the cabinet. After Davis retired as premier in 1985, Tory joined the office of the Canadian Special Envoy on Acid Rain, as special advisor. The special envoy had been appointed by the Mulroney government to review matters of air quality with a United States counterpart. Tory supported Dianne Cunningham's bid to lead the Ontario PCs in 1990.

Tory later served as tour director and campaign chairman to then Prime Minister Brian Mulroney, and managed the 1993 federal election campaign of Mulroney's successor, Kim Campbell. In his role as the Progressive Conservative campaign co-manager that year, he authorized two infamous campaign ads that ridiculed Liberal candidate Jean Chretien's face, which is partially paralyzed due to a childhood disease. The ads were greeted with much outcry among the Canadian public. They were withdrawn ten days after their first airings, and the Progressive Conservatives would proceed to be decimated in the federal election.

From 1995 to 1999, he returned to Rogers Communications, but this time as president and CEO of Rogers Media which had become one of Canada's largest publishing and broadcasting companies. Rogers has interests in radio and television stations, internet, specialty television channels, consumer magazines, trade magazines and, at the time, the Toronto Sun and the Sun newspaper chain.

In 1999, he became president and CEO of Rogers subsidiary Rogers Cable, which he led through a period of transition from a monopoly environment to an open marketplace, overseeing a significant increase in operating income. Tory stepped down after Ted Rogers announced that he would stay on as president and CEO of parent company Rogers Communications. He served as the ninth commissioner of the Canadian Football League from 1996 to 2000. Tory later was a board member of Rogers between 2010 and 2014, stepping down to run for Mayor of Toronto.

Tory continued to have an interest in being a broadcaster throughout his life and, as a Rogers executive, hosted a public affairs program on Rogers Cable's community access channel for many years. He sat as a board member of Metro Inc., the Quebec-based parent corporation for Metro and Food Basics grocery stores.

=== First campaign for mayor (2003) ===
After six years as a key backer of retiring Toronto Mayor Mel Lastman, Tory ran in the November 2003 election for mayor of Toronto. He finished in second place, behind councillor David Miller and ahead of former mayor Barbara Hall, former councillor and MP John Nunziata, and former councillor and budget chief Tom Jakobek.

Tory and Miller both entered the race with limited name recognition and support, but each quickly claimed a core base—Miller among progressives and Tory among more conservative voters. Meanwhile, Hall's initially commanding lead slowly dissipated over the course of the campaign, and the campaigns of both Nunziata and Jakobek were sidelined by controversies.. One of his campaign co-chairs was Mitzie Hunter.

Tory also accepted an endorsement from the Toronto Police Association. He held the traditional suburban conservative vote that had helped to elect Mel Lastman in the 1997 mayor's campaign, but lost the overall vote to Miller in a close race. After the election, Tory helped Miller and Hall raise funds to repay their campaign debts.

== Leader of the Ontario PC Party ==
In March 2004, Tory hinted that he would be seeking the leadership of the Progressive Conservatives, after Ernie Eves announced his intention to resign from that post. The provincial PC leadership election was announced for September 18, 2004, and Tory made his candidacy official on May 6, 2004. John Laschinger was appointed to be Tory's campaign manager. Tory won the support of former provincial cabinet ministers Elizabeth Witmer, David Tsubouchi, Jim Wilson, Janet Ecker, Chris Hodgson, Cam Jackson, Phil Gillies and Bob Runciman as well as backbench members of Provincial Parliament (MPPs) Norm Miller, Laurie Scott, Ted Arnott and John O'Toole.

Tory's opponents for the leadership post were former provincial minister of finance Jim Flaherty and Oak Ridges MPP Frank Klees. Tory defeated Flaherty with 54 per cent on the second ballot. When Flaherty later left provincial politics to seek a seat in the House of Commons as a member of the Conservative Party of Canada, Tory endorsed his former rival in the 2006 election; Flaherty was elected and was appointed the federal minister of finance. Tory also campaigned prominently with Flaherty's wife Christine Elliott in the provincial by-election held March 30, enabling her to win the seat formerly held by her husband.

Tory told the media in November 2004 that he would seek election to the legislature in time for the spring 2005 legislative session.

On January 31, 2005, after much public speculation and some delay, Ernie Eves resigned his seat and cleared the way for Tory to run in Dufferin—Peel—Wellington—Grey, the safest PC seat in the province. As a "parachute candidate", Tory faced some criticism about his commitment to the riding. Nevertheless, he easily won the March 17, 2005 by-election with 56 per cent of the vote. Former premier Bill Davis appeared for Tory's first session in the legislature as PC leader.

=== 2007 Ontario general election ===
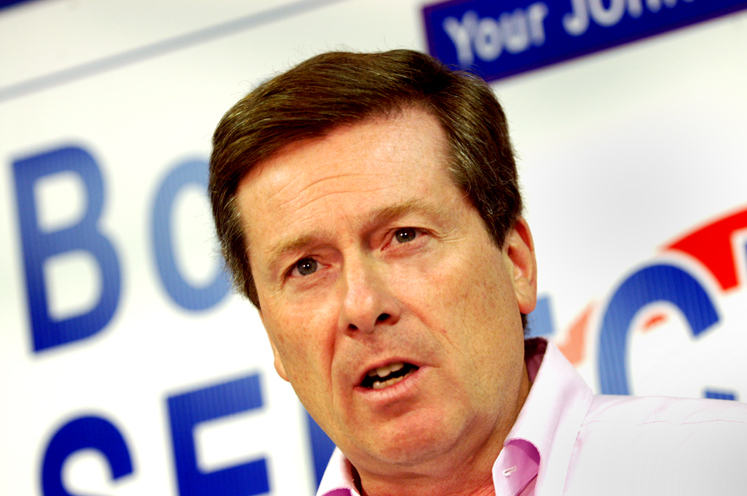
Tory in Guelph, September 24, 2007

In the 2007 general election, Tory ran in the Toronto riding of Don Valley West, the area where he grew up, raised his family and lived most of his life.

Tory released his platform on June 9, 2007. The platform, A Plan for a Better Ontario, commits a PC government to eliminate the health care tax introduced by the previous government, put scrubbers on coal-fired power plants, address Ontario's doctor shortage, allow new private health care partnerships provided services are paid by the Ontario Health Insurance Plan (OHIP), impose more penalties on illegal land occupations in response to the Caledonia land dispute, fast-track the building of nuclear power plants, and invest the gas tax in public transit and roads. A costing of the platform released in August estimated that the PC promises would cost an additional $14 billion over four years.

The PC campaign was formally launched on September 3. Most of the campaign was dominated by discussion of his plan to extend public funding to Ontario's faith-based separate schools, during which Tory supported allowing the teaching of creationism in religious studies classes. Earlier in the year, indications were that the party would have been a strong contender to win the election, but the school funding promise resulted in the Liberals regaining the lead in popular support for the duration of the campaign. Later in the campaign, in the face of heavy opposition, Tory promised a free vote on the issue.

With the beginning of the official campaign period on September 10, the PC campaign made clear its intention to make the previous government's record a key issue. In particular, Tory focused on the Liberals' 2003 election and 2004 pre-budget promise not to raise taxes and their subsequent imposition of a health care tax.

On election night, the PCs made minor gains and remained the Official Opposition while Dalton McGuinty's Liberals were re-elected with a majority. Tory was defeated in Don Valley West by the incumbent Ontario Liberal MPP, Minister of Education Kathleen Wynne. Although Tory was defeated in both his riding of Don Valley West and the race for the premiership, he said that he would stay on as leader unless the party wanted him to resign.

=== Leading from outside the legislature ===
As a result of the election loss, the party decided to hold a leadership review vote at its 2008 general party meeting in London. Tory received 66.9 percent support, lower than internal tracking which showed him in the more comfortable 70 percent range. Three hours after the leadership review vote, Tory announced to the delegates that he would be staying on as leader. He came under heavy criticism from several party members following this delay, with his opponents signalling that they would continue to call for an end to what they called his 'weak' leadership. Other party members supported Tory, saying that his opponents should accept the results and move on.

Throughout 2008, Tory's leadership of the party was perceived to be tenuous, as he faced widespread criticism for his seeming failure to convince a sitting MPP to resign in order to open a seat for him. Most notably, Bill Murdoch called for Tory to resign as party leader in September, resulting in his suspension from the party caucus on September 12. Six days later, Murdoch was permanently expelled from the party caucus. In December 2008, media pundits speculated that Prime Minister Stephen Harper would appoint PC MPP Bob Runciman to the Senate in order to clear the way for Tory to run in Runciman's comfortably safe riding of Leeds—Grenville. However, Harper did not do so.

On January 9, 2009, PC MPP Laurie Scott announced her resignation from the legislature, allowing Tory to run in the resulting by-election in Haliburton—Kawartha Lakes—Brock, a normally safe PC riding in central Ontario. In exchange for agreeing to resign, Scott was given the post of chair of the party's election preparedness committee until the 2011 election, and $100,000 in severance pay. On March 5, 2009, he lost the by-election to Liberal candidate Rick Johnson. Tory announced his resignation from the party leadership the next day and was succeeded by Bob Runciman as interim leader; Runciman had served twice as leader of the opposition during the two times Tory did not have a seat in the legislature. Niagara West—Glanbrook MPP Tim Hudak won the 2009 Ontario Progressive Conservative leadership election to become party leader and opposition leader.

== Return to broadcasting ==
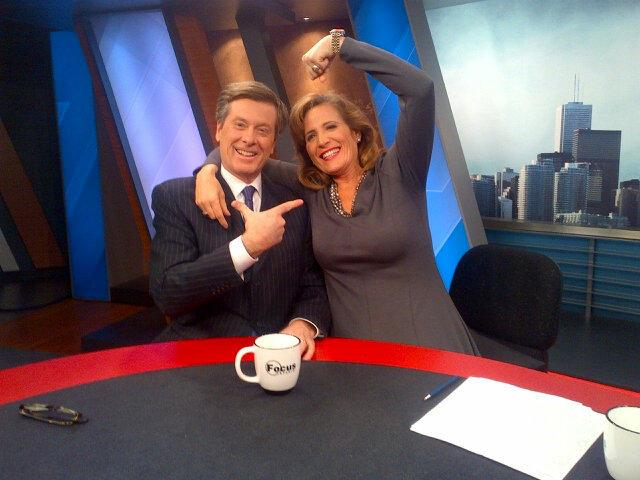
Tory seated at a television studio set with Sandra Pupatello in January 2013

Several weeks following the end of his provincial political career, Tory announced he was returning to broadcasting, to host a Sunday evening phone-in show on Toronto talk radio station CFRB. The John Tory Show simulcast on CHAM in Hamilton and CKTB in St. Catharines. He was also looking for opportunities in business, law or the non-profit sector.

In the fall of 2009, CFRB moved Tory to its Monday to Friday afternoon slot, for a new show, Live Drive, airing from 4pm to 7pm. The show first broadcast on October 5, 2009.

Tory was considering challenging incumbent Toronto Mayor David Miller in the 2010 municipal election as was Ontario Deputy Premier George Smitherman. On September 25, 2009, Miller announced he was not running for re-election. Tory announced on January 7 that he was not running in order to continue his radio show and also become head of the Toronto City Summit Alliance. On August 5, 2010, after a week of press speculation that he was about to re-enter the race, Tory confirmed that he would not be running in 2010 for mayor of Toronto.

Tory's last broadcast was February 21, 2014, after which he declared his candidacy for mayor.

== Mayor of Toronto (2014–2023) ==
=== Elections ===
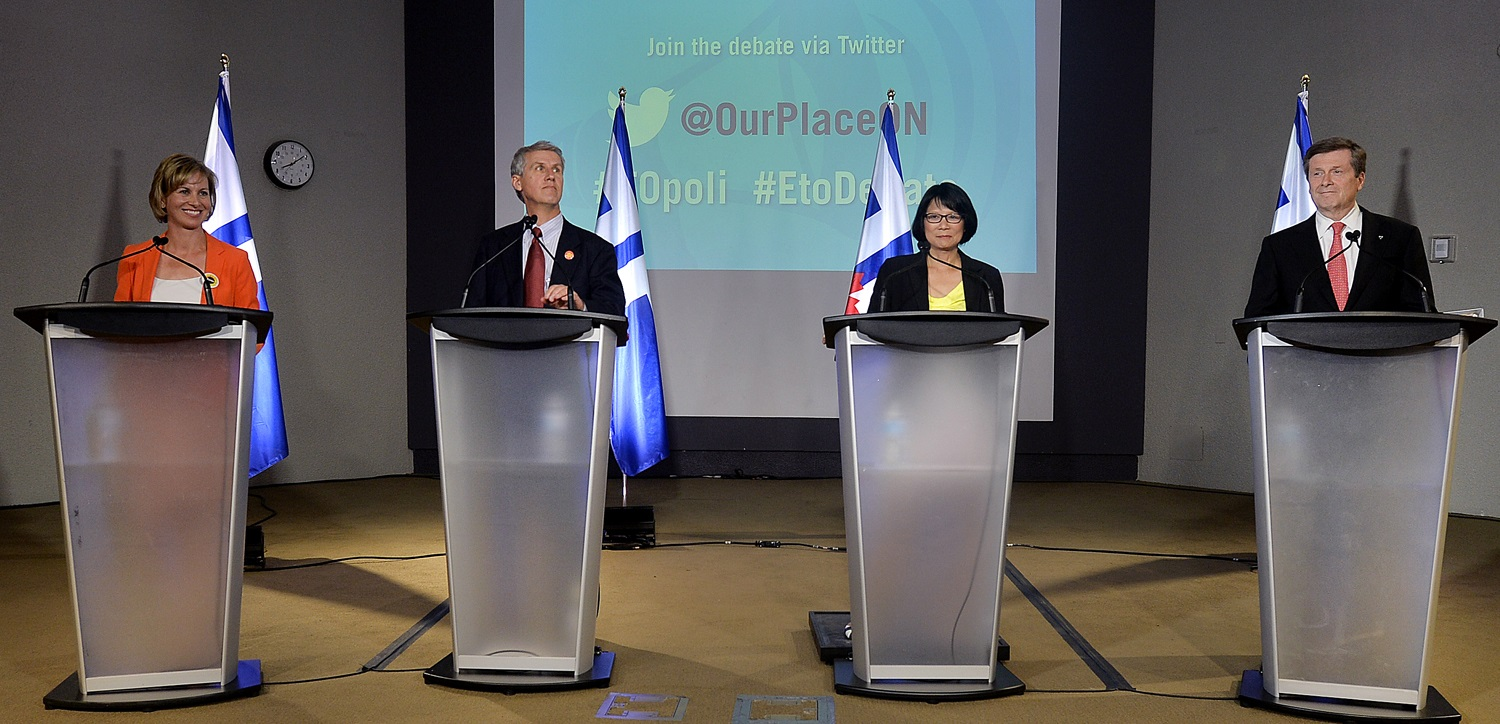
Tory on stage with other mayoral candidates prior to a debate, June 2014

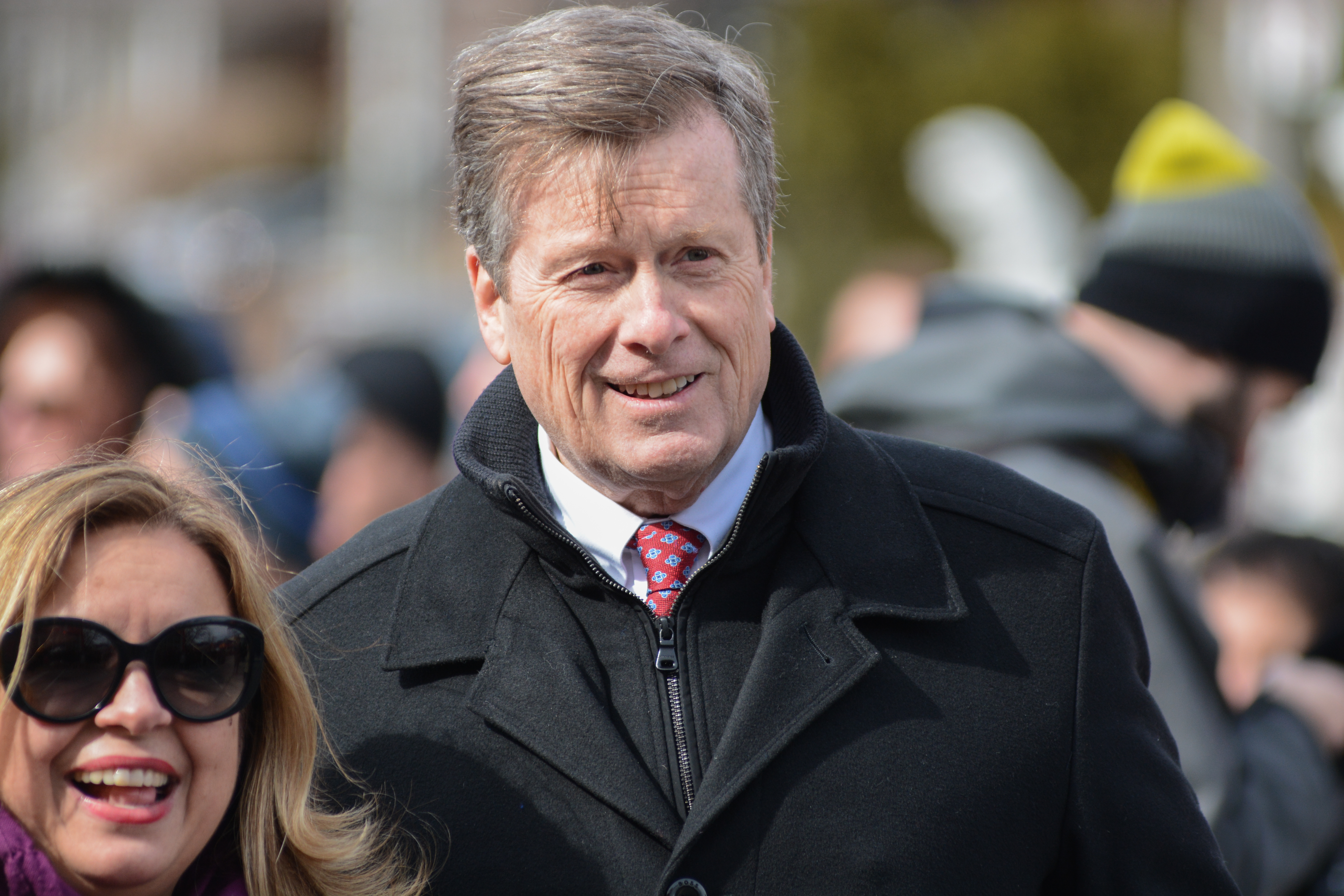
Tory (pictured in 2018) served as Mayor of Toronto from 2014 to 2023.

Tory registered as a candidate for the 2014 Toronto mayoral election on February 24, 2014. In his launch video he stated that building a Yonge Street relief line was "job one" if elected mayor. On May 27, he announced his Toronto relief plan, entitled SmartTrack, providing electric commuter rail along existing GO train infrastructure with service from Unionville to Pearson Airport. SmartTrack construction has still not begun as well as having seen several changes. On October 27, 2014, Tory was elected as mayor of Toronto.

Tory became mayor of Toronto on December 1, 2014. He spent his first day meeting with Premier Kathleen Wynne, emphasizing the importance of working with other levels of government. He also announced that Councillor Denzil Minnan-Wong would be his deputy mayor. Minnan-Wong remained in the position for two terms, but did not seek re-election in 2022, and Tory selected Councillor Jennifer McKelvie as deputy mayor for his third term.

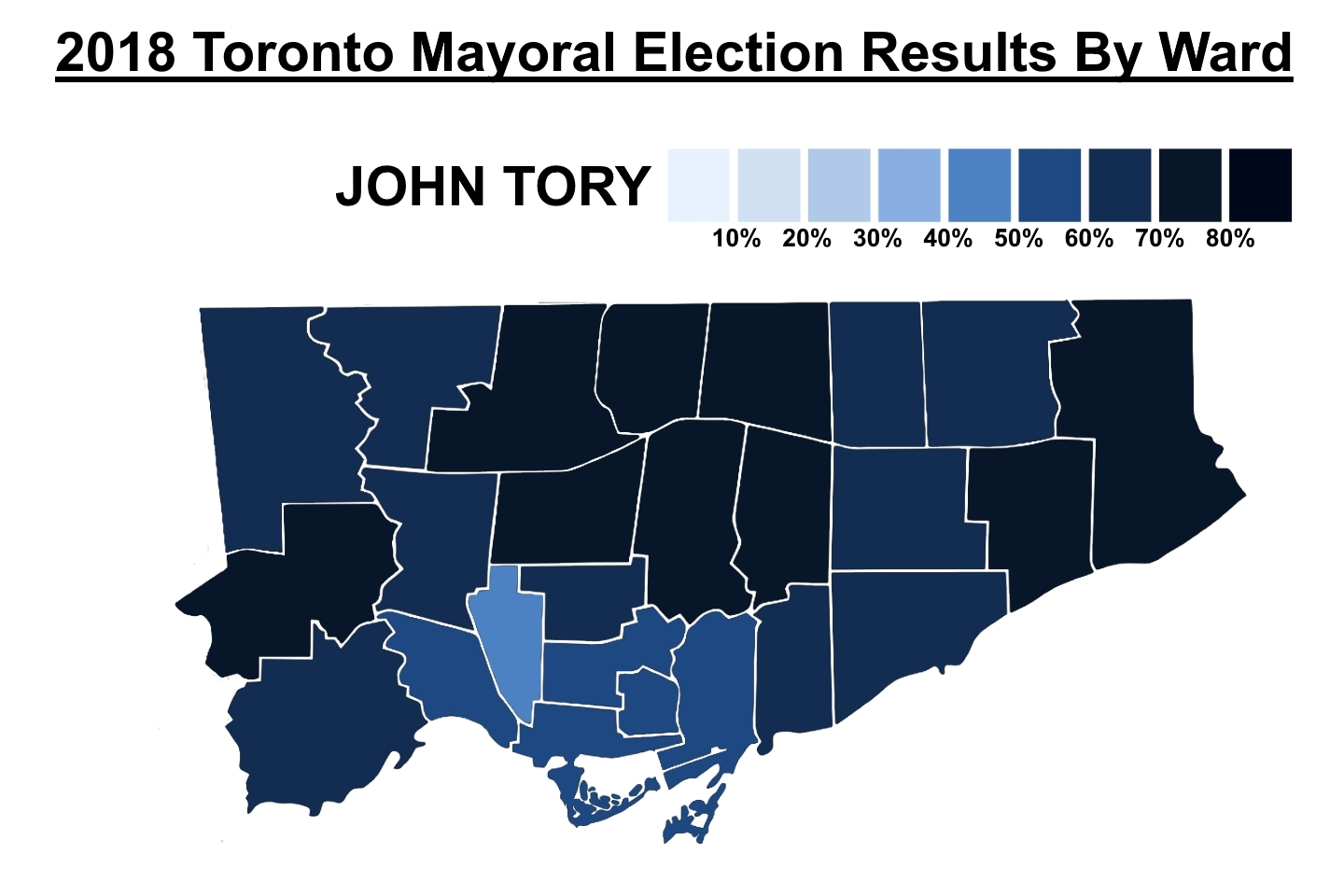
The percentage of the vote won by John Tory in each municipal ward in Toronto's 2018 mayoral election

On May 1, 2018, Tory registered his candidacy for re-election. Tory retained a high approval rating at 58%, with only 24% disapproving, and 18% undecided. He was a front runner in the polls for the mayoral election at 65–70% support. Tory was re-elected mayor of Toronto on October 22, 2018, defeating former chief city planner Jennifer Keesmaat with 63.49% of the vote.

Tory was re-elected to a third term in 2022, defeating urbanist Gil Penalosa with 62% of the vote.

=== Community safety and policing ===
Tory has sat on the Toronto Police Services Board (TPSB) since his election as mayor in 2014. The TPSB oversees the Toronto Police Service (TPS) by hiring the chief of police, setting policies, and approving the annual police budget.

==== Community contacts policy (carding) ====
Soon after the 2014 election, the TPSB quashed rules governing the use of the community contacts policy ("carding"), a controversial practice allowing police to randomly and routinely stop and demand identification and personal information from any individual deemed suspicious. The information collected is kept on record for an unspecified period and is easily accessible by police officers. Opponents allege it disproportionately targets Black people. The previous rules, brought in by former police chief Bill Blair, had required police to inform stopped individuals of their rights and to keep a record of each stop. Blair had also suspended the practice pending new rules.

Despite public demand to completely end carding, Tory initially defended the policy in general, stating it should be reformed, but not stopped. The practice was defended by the police union, which maintained that it was a "proven, pro-active police investigative strategy that reduces, prevents and solves crime". On June 7, 2015, Tory called for an end to the policy, describing it as "illegitimate, disrespectful and hurtful" and stating it had "eroded the public trust". In the TPSB meeting on June 18, Tory introduced a motion to end carding, however, the motion was subsequently amended to return to an initial 2014 version of the policy, which required officers to notify those they stop that the contact is voluntary and issue a physical receipt following the interaction. Carding was effectively ended province-wide in 2017 when the provincial community safety minister, Yasir Naqvi, issued a regulation banning police from collecting data arbitrarily.

==== Police reform ====
On June 25, 2020, in response to calls for police reform following the murder of George Floyd in the United States and a series of incidents in Toronto such as the death of Regis Korchinski-Paquet, councillors Josh Matlow and Kristyn Wong-Tam introduced a motion to cut the Toronto police budget by $122 million, or 10 per cent, and reallocate funds to community programming. Tory, along with a majority of council, rejected the proposal, instead passing a series of motions supported by Tory which did not include immediate defunding of the police. Among the motions included the creation of a non-police crisis response pilot program and a $5 million funding increase to allow for front-line officers to be equipped with body cameras. Tory claimed that a reduction in budget was likely if the program was successful.

During his term of office, he insisted on strengthening the resources of the police, the municipality's main financial asset. The priority given to the police was at the expense of social services and housing, whose budgets were reduced.

==== Toronto Community Crisis Service ====
At its meeting on June 25, 2020, Toronto City Council considered a series of motions aimed at reforming policing and crisis response in the city. Tory tabled a motion to "detask" the police. The city would explore how duties currently assigned to sworn officers would be assumed by "alternative models of community safety response" to incidents where neither violence nor weapons are at issue. The proposal would "commit that its first funding priority for future budgets [be] centered [sic] on a robust system of social supports and services" and make an itemized line-by-line breakdown of the police budget public; a reduction in the police budget would likely ensue, according to the motion. Tory's motion passed unanimously on June 29.

On January 26, 2022, the Executive Committee approved a staff report outlining an implementation plan for the pilot program. It was subsequently adopted by city council on February 2. According to Tory, "the pilots will allow the city to test and to evaluate and to revise this model before we implement it on a larger scale but make no mistake it is our intention to implement it on a larger scale and to have it city-wide by 2025 at the latest".

In March 2022, the city launched the Toronto Community Crisis Service pilot program.

==== TTC safety ====
In 2022 and 2023, Toronto saw a series of violent incidents on the transit system, which saw employees and passengers seriously injured or killed in seemingly random attacks. Union leaders and passenger advocacy groups demanded action from the city, calling for increased mental health programs, social services and security. On January 26, 2023, Tory, along with police chief Myron Demkiw and TTC CEO Rick Leary announced that the city would deploy 80 additional police officers to patrol the transit system, using off-duty officers in an overtime capacity. Additionally, the TTC announced it would deploy 20 workers to provide outreach services to the homeless population on the TTC, and 50 security guards.

=== Transportation ===
==== SmartTrack ====
As part of his campaign in 2014, Tory proposed utilizing existing GO Transit rail corridors to construct an above ground relief line, building on the existing GO Regional Express Rail expansion plan. The proposal would see the service operate 22 "surface subway" stations alongside GO trains from Mississauga's Airport Corporate Centre south through Etobicoke towards Union Station, then north towards Markham. Tory initially said that the proposal would cost $8 billion, with the city covering $2.5 billion, funded through tax increment financing, and that SmartTrack would be completed in seven years.

After his election, as city and Metrolinx staff began studying his proposal, SmartTrack plans began to change, with stations changing, and questions raised surrounding the costs and integration. An updated plan saw the western portion being dropped in favour of extending the Eglinton Crosstown LRT. As other transit projects emerged, such as the Ontario Line, stations were dropped which would be serviced by new proposals.

The plan currently in place sees the construction of five new transit stations being completed in 2026, at a cost of $1.463 billion to the city.

==== Scarborough Subway extension ====
Tory supports a one-stop extension of Toronto subway Line 2 to serve a proposed transit hub at the Scarborough Town Centre as opposed to the three-stop Scarborough previously approved and fully funded under Ford. The LRT alternative failed in council in 2016. The Scarborough Subway Extension has completed the planning stage and as of 2016 was in the detailed design stage, with an estimated operation date of 2023.

==== Gardiner Expressway ====
In 2016, council faced a decision on the future of the elevated portion of the Gardiner Expressway east of Jarvis Street, as the aging structure would require significant renovations it was to remain in service beyond 2020. Citing his election promise to improve traffic, Tory supported a hybrid option, which would see roughly $1 billion spent to reconstruct the structure with on and off ramps reconfigured. The alternative proposal would have seen the expressway torn down at a cost of $461 million. On this issue, three members of his executive committee opposed him. Other politicians, including former mayor David Crombie and former chief city planner and 2018 Toronto mayoral candidate Jennifer Keesmaat opposed the renovation of the Gardiner Expressway, and prefer to tear it down instead.

==== Road tolls ====
During the 2003 election, Tory initially positioned himself against road tolls. As mayor, Tory's position softened in 2016 when the city considered how it could raise revenue to fund transit projects. In November 2016, Tory's announced that he would support tolls on the two municipally owned expressways, the Gardiner Expressway and Don Valley Parkway, which would have raised roughly $200 million annually. The proposal passed city council, however, as the municipal government is a creation of the provincial legislature, the city would need approval from the province to implement tolls, as the City of Toronto Act, which lays out the city's legal powers did not allow for road tolls.

The provincial government ultimately rejected the idea in January 2017, with Premier Wynne stating that her government could not endorse road tolls on the Gardiner and Don Valley Parkway until better transit alternatives were in place for commuters outside of the city to enter downtown. Wynne instead committed to increasing the municipal share of the gas tax, which would give the city $170 million annually by 2022. While Tory was thankful for the increased gas tax share, he harshly criticized the province for denying the city a long-term option.

During the 2022 municipal election, Tory once again floated the idea of introducing road tolls. The provincial government under Premier Doug Ford once again rejected the idea.

=== Housing ===
In 2014, Tory selected Councillor Ana Bailão to be the chair of the affordable housing committee.

==== Modular housing ====
In September 2020 during the COVID-19 pandemic, the city launched a housing response plan which would see 1000 units of modular housing contracted. The initiative identifies city owned sites to place the units and is part of the city's housing strategy.

==== Toronto Seniors Housing Corporation ====
In 2021, the city launched a senior-focused social housing provider known as the Toronto Seniors Housing Corporation. It provides housing to 15,000 low and moderate income seniors in 83 Toronto Community Housing Corporation buildings, and employs staff from Toronto Community Housing's former seniors unit.

==== ModernTO ====
Initially launched in 2019 to optimize the city's office space, the ModernTO initiative was adopted by Toronto City Council in April 2022 and seeks to redevelop a number of city-owned properties as affordable housing. The initiative sees the city reduce its office footprint from 55 to 15 locations by creating office hubs in central buildings such as City Hall, the civic centres and Metro Hall. Eight buildings will be repurposed into affordable housing, creating 500 to 600 units.

==== 2023 housing action plan ====
Following the 2022 election, Tory introduced a suite of proposals in city council which would overhaul the city's housing strategy. The proposals include ending exclusionary zoning, which would update by-laws to legalize laneway suites and garden suites, as well as exempting developments of four units or less from development charges. It includes incentivizing construction of rental housing by reducing fees and charges, the creation of a new Development and Growth Division, which aims at speeding up approval times. The proposal also allocates a portion of city-owned land to be developed by non-profits, asks the province to allow the city to create a "use it or lose it" policy for developers sitting on approved but undeveloped land. City staff will report back to council in March 2023 with a report on how to implement the changes.

While introduced with the housing action plan, a separate item includes legalize rooming houses city-wide by March 2024, which was previously deferred due to lack of support on council.

The proposal was described as "a profoundly bold plan" by former chief planner Jennifer Keesmaat, who ran against Tory for mayor in 2018, and praised by housing advocacy groups. Councillor Stephen Holyday described the plan as a "death blow" to detached homes such as those in his Etobicoke Centre ward.

=== Parks and recreation ===
==== Rail Deck Park ====
In August 2016, Tory proposed the development of a 21-acre greenspace in the downtown core constructed above the Railway Lands. The proposed park would span between the Rogers Centre and Bathurst Street. The proposal was priced at $1.66 billion.

The plan was contingent on the city securing air rights to the lands above the railway, owned by Canadian National Railway and Toronto Terminals Railway. A group of private developers disputed this, claiming they had already owned the air rights. City council moved to re-zone the area above the railway for park use only, which would prevent developers from building residential buildings as is the case in the surrounding area. The developers sided with the city in the provincial government's Local Planning Appeal Tribunal (LPAT), which sided with the city, noting the growing downtown core and a lack of open space. The developers wished to build a 12-acre park as part of a development of eight condo and office towers.

In May 2021, LPAT issued a new ruling in response to sided with the developers, ruling the city should not have rejected a proposal to build a "mixed use community" over the land. The tribunal decision effectively ended the city's plans to develop the land as park space. In a statement, Tory said he was "deeply disappointed" by the ruling and "the possible impact on the future of Rail Deck Park".

The development group plans to build a park at half the size of the city's original proposal, with mixed use towers taking up the remaining space.

=== COVID-19 pandemic ===
On March 23, 2020, a state of emergency was declared in Toronto by Tory, amid the COVID-19 pandemic. This came six days after Ontario Premier Doug Ford declared a state of emergency in the province, which included prohibition of all public events of over 50 people (later reduced to 5 people on March 28), closure of bars and restaurants (with the exception that restaurants could continue to provide takeout and delivery services) as well as libraries, theatres, cinemas, schools and daycares. On March 31, Tory announced that the City of Toronto would cancel all city-led major events, festivals, conferences, permits and cultural programs until June 30.

Beginning after Canada Day, street parking enforcement as well as fare evasion enforcement returned to Toronto and the Toronto Transit Commission respectively. From July 2, 2020, face masks or coverings were required to be worn on the TTC. After July 7, masks were required in enclosed, public places.

=== Strong-mayor powers ===
Prior to the 2022 election, at the request of Tory, Premier Doug Ford's provincial government introduced legislation known as the Strong Mayors, Building More Homes Act, 2022, which granted Tory additional powers including the development of the budget, creating council committees, appointing the chairs and vice chairs of those committees, the power to reorganize departments, appointing department heads, and appointing the city manager. Tory was also granted the power to veto council decisions which do not align with priorities set by the province. On November 16, 2022, the province proposed further changes the powers of the mayor, introducing the Better Municipal Governance Act, 2022 which would allow by-laws to be passed with only one-third of council voting in favour if Tory declared it to be in line with provincial priorities.

At a press conference, Tory stated that when speaking to the public, he often hears complaints relating to housing and community safety, but nobody has complained about the new powers. The mayor's office also said he would make very limited use of new powers. The Ford government defended the new powers by pointing out the mayor's "city-wide mandate", having received more votes than the rest of council. The National Post's Adam Zivo argued that the mayor is just as legitimate as council and that the changes will increase Tory's "political capital and influence," which he can use to push for the city's interests to other levels of government.

The new legislation was condemned by Toronto City Council, which had not been consulted on the changes, some of which were introduced after the election. All five living former Toronto mayors, David Crombie, David Miller, Barbara Hall, Art Eggleton and John Sewell, wrote a letter to Tory describing the new powers as an "attack" on local democracy and majority rule. Political science professors such as Harvard's Pippa Norris and Laval's Louis Massicotte were puzzled by the legislation, as no other democratic legislature in the world can pass laws with only one-third support. Critics urged Tory to reject some, or all, of the new powers as Ottawa mayor Mark Sutcliffe had done. Toronto Sun commentator Brian Lilley supported expanded powers for the mayor due to his city-wide mandate, but argued that those powers should not include minority rule. The Globe and Mail's Marcus Gee questioned why Tory had chosen not revealed his plans to the public, and described the changes as "offensive in principle and dangerous in practice". The Toronto Star's editorial board also called on Tory to reject the new powers.

In December 2022, Tory asked the provincial government to amend the legislation to include a sunset clause after his term ends in 2026. As of 2026, the province has no public plan to review this statute.

=== Other activities ===
Tory promised to keep property tax increases at or below the rate of inflation. He had previously made the same promise during the last municipal election and kept it as mayor.

As mayor, Tory signed contracts related to snow clearing and the hosting of 2026 FIFA World Cup matches at BMO Field, both of which came under controversy after his tenure.

=== Extramarital affair and resignation ===
On February 10, 2023, the Toronto Star broke the news that during the COVID-19 pandemic, Tory had a months-long affair with a former staffer that ended earlier in 2023. Through his lawyer, Tory described the relationship as a "serious error of judgement". While no law prohibits politicians from having relationships with their staff, the Star questioned whether the relationship violated the city's internal policies.

Tory announced at a press conference the same day that he would resign as Mayor of Toronto and committed to working with Deputy Mayor Jennifer McKelvie, City Manager Paul Johnson and City Clerk John D. Elvidge to ensure an "orderly transition". He submitted his resignation letter to Elvidge on February 16, which states that his official last day would be February 17 at 5 p.m., after which McKelvie would assume certain mayoral powers until council arranged for a mayoral by-election. Former NDP MP Olivia Chow was elected to succeed Tory as mayor. Tory had endorsed his former deputy mayor Ana Bailão to succeed him. She finished second in the election.

== Post–mayoralty ==
In December 2023, several months after he resigned as mayor, Tory joined Bell Media as a municipal affairs commentator appearing on CFRB as a commentator and substitute host as well as on CTV News and CP24. In March 2024, it was announced that Tory would rejoin the board of directors of Rogers, after being a member of the board between 2010 and 2014 prior to running for Mayor of Toronto.

After months of speculation, Tory announced on March 3, 2026, that he would not challenge Chow for the mayoralty in the October 2026 election. He remains engaged in politics, endorsing federal Liberal candidate Doly Begum in the 2026 Scarborough Southwest federal by-election.

== Personal life ==
Tory has been married to Barbara Hackett, a home builder and renovator, since 1978. They met in 1976 at York University, where they both studied law and Hackett also studied business. Hackett was diagnosed with Guillain–Barré syndrome in 1991. They have four children, including aviation executive John Tory, Jr., who has broken with the Tory family's traditional support for the federal and provincial Conservatives and expressed interest in entering politics as a federal Liberal candidate. In 2026, Tory stated that he is still in a relationship with the woman he had an extramarital affair with.

Tory has two brothers, Michael and Jeffrey, and one sister, Jennifer. One of Tory's ancestors, James Tory, was a soldier in the 71st Scottish Regiment. He was captured and held as a prisoner of war during the American Revolution. He later settled in Nova Scotia in the 1780s. His maternal grandmother, Helen Yvonne Solomon, was born in 1909 to a Russian Jewish family that had immigrated to Canada six years earlier and settled in Toronto. Helen Solomon married Howard Edward Bacon, an Anglican, and their daughter Elizabeth Bacon was raised a Christian and married Tory's father, John A. Tory, in 1953.

== Honours ==
In 2012, Tory was made a member of the Order of Ontario in recognition for being "a consummate champion for the Greater Toronto Region as a founding member and chair of CivicAction and chairs and volunteers on countless fundraising campaigns". Tory is also a recipient of the Queen Elizabeth II Diamond Jubilee Medal, and holds a commission as King's Counsel. In 2011, Tory was awarded a Harry Jerome Award for his work as co-chair of DiverseCity. In June 2025, Tory was awarded the King Charles III Coronation Medal.

== Election results ==
2022 Toronto mayoral election
Candidate	Votes	%
John Tory	342,158	62.00
Gil Penalosa	98,525	17.85
Chloe-Marie Brown	34,821	6.31
Blake Acton	8893	1.61
27 other candidates	67,493	12.22
Total	551,890	100.00

2018 Toronto mayoral election
Candidate	Votes	%
John Tory	479,659	63.49
Jennifer Keesmaat	178,193	23.59
Faith Goldy	25,667	3.40
Saron Gebresellasi	15,222	2.01
64 other candidates	56,752	7.51
Total	755,493	100.00

2014 Toronto mayoral election
Candidate	Votes	%
John Tory	394,775	40.28
Doug Ford	330,610	33.73
Olivia Chow	226,879	23.15
64 other candidates	27,913	2.84
Total	980,177	100.00

Ontario provincial by-election, Haliburton—Kawartha Lakes—Brock March 5, 2009 due to resignation of Laurie Scott
Party	Candidate	Votes	%	±%
Liberal	Rick Johnson	15,542	43.88	+14.37
Progressive Conservative	John Tory	14,595	41.20	-8.79
Green	Mike Schreiner	2,330	6.58	-0.58
New Democratic	Lyn Edwards	2,112	5.96	-5.95
Independent	Jason Taylor	280	0.79	
Family Coalition	Jake Pothaar	258	0.73	+0.11
Freedom	Bill Denby	140	0.40	-0.41
Independent	John Turmel	94	0.27	
Libertarian	Paolo Fabrizio	72	0.20	
Total valid votes		35,423	100.00	
Liberal gain from Progressive Conservative		Swing	+11.58	
Source: Elections Ontario

2007 Ontario general election: Don Valley West
Party	Candidate	Votes	%	±%
Liberal	Kathleen Wynne	23,059	50.4	-
Progressive Conservative	John Tory	18,136	39.7	-
Green	Adrian Walker	2,202	4.8	-
New Democratic	Mike Kenny	2,135	4.7	-
Family Coalition	Daniel Kidd	183	0.4	-

Dufferin—Peel—Wellington—Grey by-election, March 17, 2005 resignation of Ernie Eves
Party	Candidate	Votes	%	±%
Progressive Conservative	John Tory	15,610	56.3	
Liberal	Bob Duncanson	4,625	16.7	
New Democratic	Lynda McDougall	3,881	14.0	
Green	Frank de Jong	2,767	10.0	
Family Coalition	Paul Micelli	479	1.7	
Independent	William Cook	163	0.6	
Libertarian	Philip Bender	135	0.5	
Independent	John Turmel	85	0.3	

2003 Toronto municipal election: Mayor of Toronto
Candidate	Votes	%
David Miller	299,385	43.26
John Tory	263,189	38.03
Barbara Hall	63,751	9.21
John Nunziata	36,021	5.20
Tom Jakobek	5,277	0.76
39 other candidates	24,462	3.53
Total valid votes	692,085	100.00

For full results, see Results of the 2003 Toronto election.
