= Municipal government of Toronto =

Local government of the City of Toronto

City of Toronto
- Municipal government
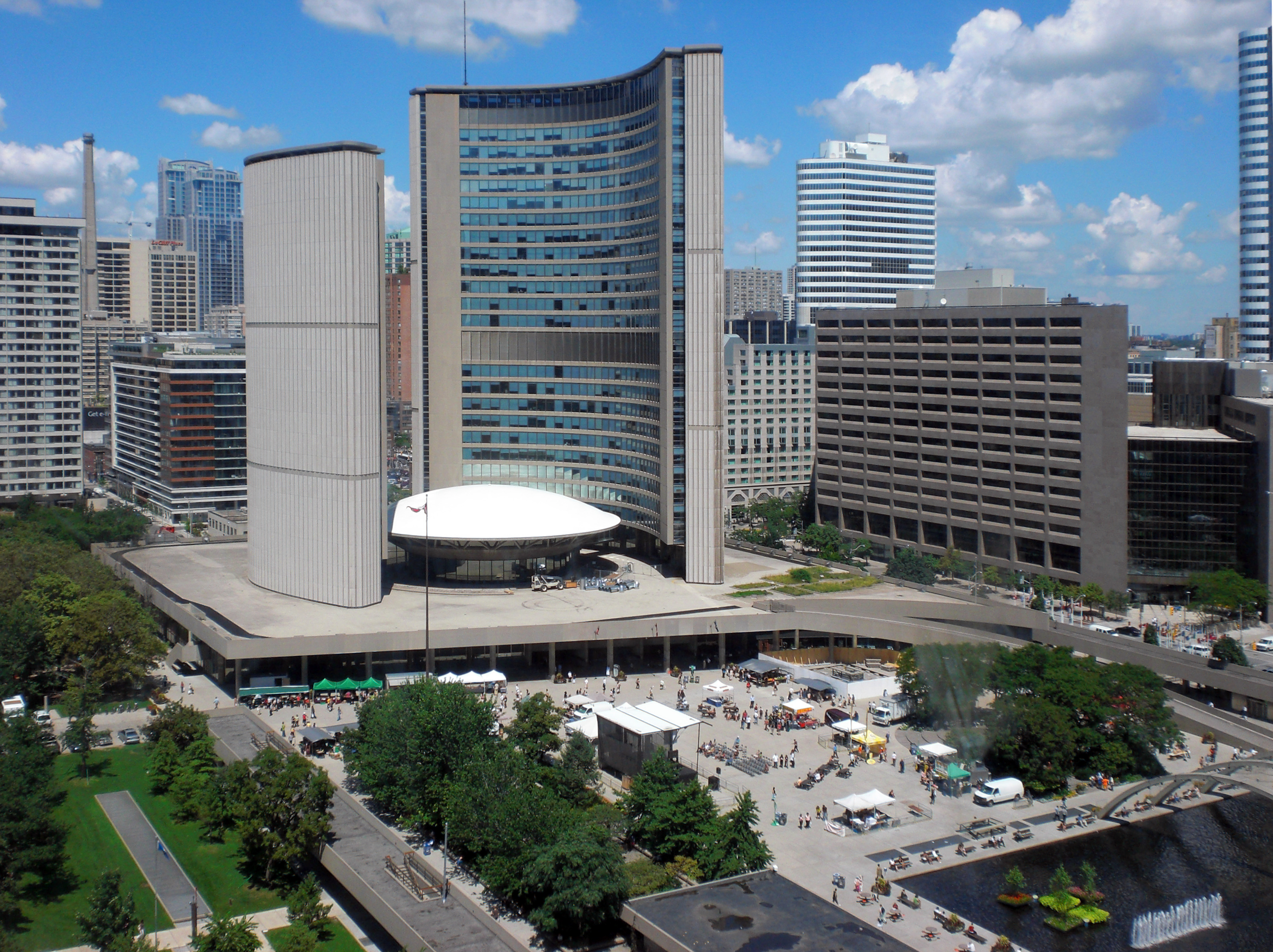
- Municipal logo Toronto City Hall, the seat of government
- Formation: January 1, 1834; 192 years ago (historic); January 1, 1998; 28 years ago (current)
- Statutory authority: City of Toronto Act, 2006; S.O. 2006, c. 11, Sched. A
- Type: Single-tier municipality with a mayor-council system
- Website: toronto.ca

City of Toronto
- Mayor: Olivia Chow
- Deputy Mayor: Ausma Malik
- City Manager: Paul Johnson

Toronto City Council
- Head of council: Olivia Chow
- Speaker: Frances Nunziata
- Membership: 1 mayor; 25 city councillors
- Appointed by: Direct election every four years
- Seat: Toronto City Hall

The municipal government of Toronto is administered by Toronto City Council and includes the City of Toronto, the primary corporation which implements the decisions of council, as well as agencies and other city-owned corporations which are overseen by a board. A creation of provincial statute, its structure and powers are set out in the City of Toronto Act.

City council is composed of 25 councillors and the mayor of Toronto. Council passes by-laws, approves spending, and has direct responsibility and oversight of services delivered by the city and its agencies; the mayor is head of council and the nominal chief executive officer (CEO). The mayor appoints the city's senior management, selects councillors to chair the city's committees, and develops the annual budget.

The Toronto Public Service is the municipal civil service. The city employs over 43,000 staff, who provide politically neutral advice and implement the policies, programs and decisions of city council. The city manager sits at the top of the city's administrative structure as head of the Toronto Public Service and the chief administrative officer (CAO). The city manager, along with other senior leadership roles such as deputy city managers and the general managers of city divisions, are appointed by the mayor and take direction from council.

== Administration and governance ==
As the City of Toronto is constituted by, and derives its powers from, the province of Ontario, it is a "creature of the province" and is legally bound by various regulations and legislation of the Ontario Legislature, such as the City of Toronto Act, Municipal Elections Act, Planning Act, and others.

The City of Toronto Act lays down the division of powers, responsibilities and required duties of the corporation. It provides that if the City appoints a chief administrative officer (the city manager), then that person shall be responsible for the administrative management and operation of the City.

The Toronto Public Service By-law (TPS By-law), Chapter 192 of Toronto's municipal code, further strengthens the separation of the administrative components (the public service) and the political components (mayor and council) of the City of Toronto.

In general, the council determines the services provided to residents and develops programs and policies, while the public service implements the council's decisions.

=== Toronto City Council ===
The council is the legislative body of the City of Toronto. It is composed of 25 city councillors (each representing a ward of around 96,800 people), along with the mayor. Elections are held every four years, in October, with the mayor and councillors being elected by Canadian citizens who live or own property in Toronto. The mayor of Toronto serves as the political head of the City of Toronto.

The council is the only power able to enact Toronto laws, known as by-laws, which govern the actions of the corporation and/or matters within its jurisdiction, such as administration of the Canadian Criminal Code within its borders.

It also forms several committees, including the Board of Health and "Community Councils", which hear matters relating to narrower, district issues, such as building permits and developments requiring changes to zoning by-laws. Community Council decisions, as well as those of the mayor, must be approved by the city council at regular sessions.

=== Toronto Public Service ===
The Toronto Public Service is responsible for providing politically neutral advice to council, and delivering services to the City's residents. As of March 2022, there were nearly 40,000 active employees.

The city manager (formerly the chief administrative officer), who reports to the mayor and the council, is the administrative head of the City of Toronto. While the city manager and public service are ultimately accountable to the council, the council may not give specific direction to public servants, and members of the council do not manage the day-to-day operations of the city. The following senior staff report to the city manager:

- Four deputy city managers (including one as chief financial officer and treasurer), each responsible for a service cluster
  - Heads of divisions including general managers, executive directors and directors are responsible to the city manager through the deputy city manager of their respective cluster
- Chief of staff
  - Chief communications officer and directors of executive administration, governance and corporate strategy, Toronto Office of Partnerships, Intergovernmental and Agency Relations, and the Civic Innovation Office are responsible to the city manager through the chief of staff
- Chief people officer
- Manager of the Indigenous Affairs Office

City officials reporting directly to the council:

- Auditor general
- Integrity commissioner
- Lobbyists registrar
- Ombudsman

The following officials report to the council for statutory purposes, but to the city manager for administrative purposes:

- City clerk
- City solicitor
- Medical officer of health (through the Board of Health)

== Finances ==
The City of Toronto represents the fifth-largest municipal government in North America. It has two budgets: the operating budget, which is the cost of operating programs, services, and the cost of governing; and the capital budget, which covers the cost of building and the upkeep of infrastructure. The City's capital budget and plan for 2019–2028 is CA$40.67 billion.

Under the City of Toronto Act, the Toronto government cannot run a deficit for its annual operating budget. The city's revenues include 33% from property tax, 6% from the land transfer tax, subsidies from the Canadian federal government and the Ontario provincial government, and the rest from other revenues and user fees.

The council has set the limit of debt charges not to exceed 15% of the property tax revenues. The city has an AA credit rating from Standard & Poor's, and an Aa1 credit rating from Moody's. Toronto's debt stood at $3.9 billion at the end of 2016. Capital expenditures are 39% funded from debt.

== History ==
The City of Toronto was incorporated in 1834, succeeding York, which was administered directly by the then-province of Upper Canada. The new city was administered by an elected council, which served a one-year term. The first mayor, chosen by the elected councillors, was William Lyon Mackenzie. The first by-law passed was An Act for the preventing & extinguishing of Fires. The first mayor directly elected to the post was Adam Wilson, elected in 1859. Through 1955 the term of office for the mayor and the council was one year; it then varied between two and three years until a four-year term was adopted starting in 2006. (See List of Toronto municipal elections.)

To finance operations, the municipality levied property taxes. In 1850, Toronto also started levying income taxes. Toronto levied personal income taxes until 1936, and corporate income taxes until 1944.

Until 1914, Toronto grew by annexing neighbouring municipalities such as Parkdale and Seaton Village. After 1914, Toronto stopped annexing bordering municipalities, although some municipalities overwhelmed by growth requested it. After World War II, an extensive group of suburban towns and townships surrounded Toronto. Change to the legal structure came in 1954, with the creation of the Municipality of Metropolitan Toronto (known more popularly as "Metro"). This new metropolitan government, which encompassed Toronto and the surrounding Towns of Forest Hill, Leaside, Long Branch, Mimico, New Toronto, Swansea, Weston, and the Townships of East York, Etobicoke, North York, Scarborough, and York, was created by the Government of Ontario to support suburban growth. This new municipality could borrow money on its own for capital projects and it received taxes from all municipalities including Toronto, which meant that the Toronto tax base was now available to support the suburban growth. The new metropolitan government built highways, water systems and public transit, while the thirteen townships, villages, towns, and cities continued to provide some local services to their residents. To manage the yearly upkeep of the new infrastructure, the new Metro government levied its own property tax, collected by the local municipalities.

On January 1, 1967, several of the smaller municipalities were amalgamated with larger ones, reducing their number to six. Forest Hill and Swansea became part of Toronto; Long Branch, Mimico, and New Toronto joined Etobicoke; Weston merged with York, and Leaside amalgamated with East York. The five restructured municipalities outside Toronto were given borough status and later upgraded (except East York) to city status between 1979 and 1983. This arrangement lasted until 1998.

Although a referendum of the Metro municipalities showed broad opposition, the Ontario government passed the City of Toronto Act, 1996, which spelled the demise of the Metro Toronto federation. During 1997, the municipalities of Metro were placed under provincial trusteeship. On January 1, 1998, Metro and its constituent municipalities were dissolved, replaced by the single-tier "megacity" of Toronto, which is the successor of the previous City of Toronto. Mel Lastman, the long-time mayor of North York before the amalgamation, became the first mayor (62nd overall) of the amalgamated city.

Existing by-laws of the individual municipalities were retained until new citywide by-laws could be written and enacted. New citywide by-laws have since been enacted, although many of the individual differences were continued, applying only to the districts where the by-laws applied, such as winter sidewalk clearing and garbage pickup. The existing city halls of the various municipalities were retained by the new corporation for various purposes. The City of York's civic centre became a court office. The existing 1965 City Hall of Toronto became the city hall of the amalgamated city, while Metro Hall, the seat of the former Metro government, is used as municipal office space. The community councils (unique among Ontario's cities) of Etobicoke–York, North York and Scarborough meet in their respective pre-existing municipal buildings.

In 2018, just before that year's provincial election, the Ontario government of Doug Ford passed the Better Local Government Act, which redefined the number and representation of Toronto City Council. The number of councillors was reduced to 25, and council districts were defined that matched provincial electoral districts. The passage took place during the ongoing election campaign and spurred a number of lawsuits by potential candidates and a referral to the Ontario courts of the act's constitutionality. Its constitutionality was upheld and the reduced number of councillors was elected.

In 2022, the Ford government passed the Strong Mayors, Building Homes Act, which redefined the powers of the mayor of Toronto. Under the act, the mayor could overrule a motion of City Council that had less than a 66 percent plurality. Ostensibly introduced to allow the passage of bylaws that would increase the supply of housing in Toronto, the act received considerable criticism as anti-democratic. The mayor at the time, John Tory, supported the law and pledged to continue to act by consensus.

== Divisions, agencies and corporations ==
Toronto City Council is the primary decision making body defined in the City of Toronto Act. A number of divisions (core public service, or "Toronto Public Service"; responsible to the city council through the city manager), agencies (responsible through their relevant boards), and corporations (municipally owned through the city council) administer programs and services as directed by the city council.

- Toronto City Council – Mayor of Toronto
  - Office of the City Clerk
  - Office of the Ombudsman
  - Office of the Auditor General
  - Office of the Integrity Commissioner
  - Office of the Lobbyist Registrar
  - Medical officer of health (statutory; see Public Health)
  - Office of the City Manager
    - Office of the Chief of Staff
    - Strategic Communications – Chief communications officer
    - Office of the Chief Information Security Officer
    - People & Equity Division – Chief people officer
    - Indigenous Affairs Office – Director
    - Governance & Corporate Strategy – Director
    - Intergovernmental and Agency Relations – Director
    - Executive Administration – Director
    - Strategic Partnerships – Director
    - Concept2Keys – Chief operating officer
    - Community & Social Services – Deputy city manager
      - Public Health (administrative) – Medical officer of health
      - Housing Secretariat – Executive director
      - Seniors Services and Long-Term Care – General manager
      - Children's Services – General manager
      - Parks, Forestry & Recreation – General manager
      - Court Services – Director
      - Shelter, Support & Housing Administration Division – General manager
      - Toronto Economic Development and Culture Division – General manager
      - Social Development, Finance & Administration – Executive director
      - Employment & Social Services – General manager
      - Paramedic Services – Chief & general manager
    - Infrastructure & Development Services – Deputy city manager
      - Engineering & Construction Services – Chief engineer & executive director
      - Toronto Water Division – General manager
      - Municipal Licensing & Standards Division – Executive director
      - Transit Expansion Office – Executive director
      - Policy, Planning, Finance & Administration – Executive director
      - Transportation Services – General manager
      - Solid Waste Management Services – General manager
      - City Planning – Chief planner & executive director
      - Toronto Building – Chief building official & executive director
      - Fire Services – Fire chief & general manager, Emergency Management
        - Office of Emergency Management – Director
    - Corporate Services – Deputy city manager
      - Technology Services – Chief technology officer
      - 311 Toronto – Director
      - Fleet Services – General manager
      - Environment, Climate and Forestry – Executive director
      - Corporate Real Estate Management – Executive director
    - Finance & Treasury Services – Chief financial officer and treasurer
      - Financial Planning – Executive director
      - Internal Audit – Director
      - Office of the Controller
      - Accounting Services – Director
      - Pension, Payroll & Employee Benefits – Director
      - Purchasing & Materials Management – Chief procurement officer
      - Revenue Services – Director
  - Agencies (operate separately from the core public administration; responsible to the council through respective boards)
      - CreateTO
      - Exhibition Place
      - Heritage Toronto
      - Sankofa Square
      - TO Live
      - The Atmospheric Fund
      - Toronto Investment Board
      - Toronto Parking Authority
      - Toronto Police Service – Chief of police (Toronto Police Services Board)
      - Toronto Public Library
      - Toronto Transit Commission
      - Toronto Zoo
    - Partnered agency
      - Toronto and Region Conservation Authority
  - Corporations (publicly owned by the City of Toronto through the council)
    - Build Toronto Inc.
    - Casa Loma Corporation
    - Lakeshore Arena Corporation
    - Toronto Community Housing Corporation
    - Toronto Hydro Corporation
    - Toronto Port Lands Company (Toronto Economic Development Corporation)
  - Partnered corporations
    - Toronto Pan Am Sports Centre Inc. (with University of Toronto)
    - Toronto Waterfront Revitalization Corporation (with Government of Ontario and Government of Canada)
  - Quasi-judicial and adjudicative boards
    - Administrative Penalty Tribunal (parking enforcement)
    - Committee of Adjustment
    - Committee of Revision
    - Compliance Audit Committee
    - Dangerous Dog Review Tribunal
    - Property Standards Committee
    - Rooming House Licensing Commissioner
    - Sign Variance Committee
    - Toronto Licensing Tribunal
    - Toronto Local Appeal Body
