= Janvrin =

Janvrin is the surname of

- Hal Janvrin (1892–1962), baseball player for the Boston Red Sox
- John Janvrin (1762–1835), businessman, politician, militia officer, and justice of the peace in Canada
- Kip Janvrin (born 1965), American decathlete
- Marguerite Janvrin Adams (1889–1957), American poet
- Richard Janvrin (1915–1993), Royal Navy officer
- Robin Janvrin, Baron Janvrin (born 1946), Private Secretary to the Sovereign

Janvrin may also refer to

- Janvrin Island, Canadian island near Cape Breton Island
- Janvrin Island Peninsula, Nova Scotia, community in the Canadian province of Nova Scotia
