= The Education of Everett Richardson =

1977 book by Silver Donald Cameron

- First edition
- Author: Silver Donald Cameron
- Language: English
- Genre: Non-fiction
- Publisher: McClelland and Stewart
- Publication date: 1977

The Education of Everett Richardson: The Nova Scotia Fishermen's Strike 1970–71 is a non-fiction book by the Canadian writer Silver Donald Cameron, first published in 1977 with a new edition released in 2019. It ranked 47th in a listing of Atlantic Canada's 100 Greatest Books where it was praised for giving a "gripping account" of "this pivotal moment in Canadian labour history".

Large sections of the book are presented as an oral history in which main participants in the strike speak directly to readers. As its title suggests, the book is partly about what one fisherman learns during an acrimonious, seven-month strike and its bitter aftermath in Nova Scotia's Strait of Canso area. Everett Richardson was one of 235 trawlermen from the tiny ports of Canso, Mulgrave and Petit de Grat who fought for better pay, safer working conditions, job security and, most of all, for the right to belong to the union they had chosen, the United Fishermen and Allied Workers' Union or UFAWU. Their main adversaries were two huge, foreign-owned fishing companies: Acadia Fisheries, part of a group of about 61 British companies directed from Hull, England, and Booth Canadian Fisheries Ltd., a subsidiary of Consolidated Foods, a Chicago-based company with annual sales of more than a billion dollars.

However, the fishermen also faced stiff opposition from what they called the "cod aristocracy," rich members of the Nova Scotia elite, as well as from leading politicians, judges, government bureaucrats, members of the clergy,The Chronicle Herald, the province's main daily newspaper, and the Canadian labour establishment itself. "In the end," Cameron writes, "this is not a story of the fishermen, or even of the labour movement. It is a story about privilege and poverty and injustice in this country, and about the social and political arrangements which cheat and oppress most Canadians, stunt our humanity and distort our environment.

== Nova Scotia's feudal fishing rules ==
Cameron points out that, in Nova Scotia, deep-sea fishermen had no legal right to strike because they were not considered employees, but rather "co-adventurers" sharing the costs and profits of each voyage with the big fishing companies. He writes that the typical division of the profits was from 60 to 70 per cent for the boat share and from 30 to 40 per cent for the crew, who also paid expenses including the cost of their own food. They also paid to use the companies' electronic gear. Cameron reports that a trawlerman who worked steadily was paid between $3,000 and $5,000 per year, or about a dollar an hour at most, considering that such a fisherman might make 27 trips and work 5,000 hours, which is about triple the annual working hours of the average Canadian industrial worker. In 1967, when the British Columbia-based UFAWU began an organizing drive in Nova Scotia, it found, among other things, that the fishermen had no job security; no say in the price of fish or division of the profits for the trip; no representative present when the fish were tallied and weighed and no proper statement of weights, prices or trip expenses in most ports. Cameron reports that the UFAWU successfully signed up a majority of the fishermen in the Canso Strait area. However, the fishing companies refused to deal with the union partly because they continued to argue that fishermen were "co-adventurers" and therefore, not eligible to join unions. The companies also made it clear that they did not want a militant, West Coast union to get a foothold in Nova Scotia, especially one that was led by Homer Stevens, a member of the Communist Party of Canada.

== Fishermen's strike, 1970 ==
Cameron gives a detailed account of the strike which began on March 30 and April 2, 1970, when trawlermen walked off the boats demanding recognition of the UFAWU as their sole bargaining agent. Their strike forced the companies to close three fish plants and lay off 800 shore-workers. The companies repeatedly refused to negotiate with the UFAWU. They maintained that if the fishermen would sign up with any other union that belonged to the Canadian Labour Congress, they would recognize it immediately. But the trawlermen held fast. After two months, the companies won a court injunction prohibiting the fishermen from further picketing, but the trawlermen refused to obey. Their defiance, at first, led to jail sentences of between 20 and 30 days, but the judge sentenced Everett Richardson to nine months apparently for telling a reporter the men would continue to picket until their demands were met. The next day 7,000 workers, including miners and construction crews in industrial Cape Breton, walked off their jobs in protest and after a few days, strikers who had been jailed, including Richardson, were released on bail. "Everett's name was by now a household word in Nova Scotia," Cameron writes, "his sentence more than any other single thing, had brought the fish strike to the centre of the province's life."

On August 20, with the strike in its fifth month, a one-man Commission appointed by the federal and provincial governments suggested that the strikers appoint ad hoc committees from each of the three ports to negotiate with the companies. It was a recommendation designed to get around the companies' refusal to negotiate directly with the UFAWU. Eventually, the strikers reluctantly agreed to form the committees and after many setbacks and delays, they negotiated a temporary agreement ending their strike on October 31, 1970. The agreement included some increases in fish prices and somewhat better working conditions. The trawlermen made it clear, however, that they would be free to return to the picket lines if they did not have collective bargaining rights and the recognition of their union by the end of April 1971.

== Bitter aftermath, 1971 ==
The strike itself may have been over, but Cameron notes that the struggle itself was not. The fishing companies soon exploited a split in the labour movement between the more militant UFAWU and the Canadian Food and Allied Workers (CFAWU), the union that, with the backing of the Canadian Labour Congress, wanted to represent all of the workers in the food industry. A newly elected Liberal government introduced provincial legislation granting fishermen bargaining rights, but before it finally passed on March 17, 1971, the companies voluntarily recognized CFAWU and signed new contracts granting the union a closed shop. That meant that unless the fishermen joined CFAWU and abandoned the UFAWU, they would not be allowed to work on the trawlers. Cameron fully chronicles the months of struggle including the raids by the CFAWU and the resulting appeals to the Nova Scotia Labour Relations Board, but in the end, the fishermen were deprived of the union they had chosen. Some of the trawlermen reluctantly signed CFAWU cards, some left Nova Scotia to work in B.C., while others, such as Everett Richardson, bought their own boats and turned to inshore fishing. Acadia Fisheries went out of business within a few months. Its plant in Canso was taken over by Canso Seafoods, a subsidiary of H.B. Nickerson and Sons of North Sydney, Nova Scotia. Booth Fisheries pulled out in 1974 to consolidate its operations in Newfoundland, just in time, Cameron observes cheerfully "for the bitter 1975 strike by the Food Workers' affiliate there." He writes that Usen Fisheries, a Boston-based company, operated the Booth plant for two years before finally buying it.

"In the end," Cameron concludes, "the fishermen were collective heroes and martyrs, who lost the battle for themselves but won it for their brothers." He adds that "they smashed the archaic prohibition on fishermen's unions", changing the working conditions on the boats and leaving "the see-saw of power balanced a little more evenly." Cameron makes it clear that in spite of the strike's outcome, he sees it as a victory for organized labour. "Thousands of Nova Scotians," he writes, "who had dismissed the labour movement as an outmoded idea, a preserve of thugs and opportunists, suddenly saw anew its fundamental glory, its insistence on respect for human labour and its resistance to the moral squalor of exploitation. If the strike was a failure, let us pray for more failures like it."

== Structure of the book ==
The Education of Everett Richardson is organized into chapters that refer to the various levels of the Canadian education system from elementary school through to post-graduate study. Its first chapter, for example, is titled, "GRADE SCHOOL: Who Needs a Union?", while the last one is called "GRADUATE STUDY: The Spring of the Jackals". The book also contains a prologue and epilogue as well as four interludes that appear between the chapters. Cameron uses the interludes to introduce new characters or to present additional aspects of the fishermen's strike. For example, an interlude called "The Pulpits and The Papers" describes how the clergy and the press were split between strong support for, and sustained opposition to, the fishermen's cause. Cameron writes that although the church and press were "bitterly divided," the most powerful forces in each were ranged against the fishermen reflecting the broader Nova Scotia establishment's determination to prevent militant unionism from taking hold in the fishing industry. He concludes that the judge who sentenced Everett Richardson to nine months in jail was not acting consciously on behalf of the fishing companies. "But," he adds, "the law is not impartial when a poor man meets a rich one. The law reflects not justice, but power. Laws are made by those who have the power to enforce them. And them fellers ain't fishermen. Not a single one of 'em."

Another interlude, entitled "Country Cunning and Unofficial Life", features an open letter from Cameron to Everett Richardson. The letter outlines Cameron's view of the fishermen's strike as a "peasant's revolt." It describes what Cameron sees as peasant characteristics including a code of ethics based on loyalty to one's own people and suspicion toward outsiders such as police, company managers and government bureaucrats. The letter points to self-sufficiency as another characteristic with peasants growing as much of their own food as they can, raising livestock, doing a little fishing and woodcutting supplemented by some "outside labour" such as delivering mail, working on the roads or driving the school bus. "You built your own house," Cameron writes, "with lumber milled from the land you'd inherited from your grandfather. You went to church and respected the priest but you didn't take it all too seriously." Cameron adds, however, that by 1970, the peasant way of life was disappearing with the advent of television, paved roads, consolidated schools, automatic oil furnaces, electric appliances and nine-to-five jobs, all of which represented "the gradual reduction of rounded human beings into workers and consumers." Cameron argues that in 19th-century England, exploited industrial workers fought for political reform and joined unions:

That ought to sound familiar, because that's what was happening in Nova Scotia in the summer of 1970. Fishing had been industrialized. When you started, thirty years ago, one last two-dory schooner was still fishing out of Canso. By 1970 you were fishing in huge mechanized ships that were very like factories. You started as a peasant, you were becoming an industrial proletarian. You did what people have always done in the circumstances: you formed a union...You fellows had been rooked for generations, you were being rooked worse than ever. You saw a chance to stop it, and you stood up and said, this is wrong and we will stop it. You endured what had to be endured and you wouldn't quit. You stood there long enough to become for Nova Scotians what Mahatma Gandhi and Martin Luther King had been in their communities—or, nearer to home, what Joe Howe and J.B. McLachlan had been earlier in Nova Scotia's own history. You became symbolic figures, reminding us that the brotherhood of man is an ideal which has not been achieved and may never be achieved, but for which people still think it worthwhile to struggle and suffer. That's why so many of us down here are proud to be friends of the fishermen. We owe you a hell of a lot.

== Critical reaction ==
Some of the controversy surrounding the fishermen's strike seemed to rub off initially on The Education of Everett Richardson. In The Globe and Mail, for example, reviewer Patrick O'Flaherty complained that the book was filled what he termed "the cant of the sixties" including references to "beautiful kids" (at the universities), "walking corpses" (in the suburbs) and "out-door orgasms." O'Flaherty objected to Cameron's references to oppressive social and political arrangements. "Oh for a new breed of writers," he lamented, "to de-Engel, de-Atwood, de-Cameron, and in general deodorize the Canadian literary atmosphere, which continues to stink of parlor radical sanctimoniousness." While O'Flaherty wrote that Cameron was probably right to side with the union in the fishermen's dispute, he argued it was doubtful the labour movement would benefit from Cameron's portrayal of the fishermen "as little more than innocent victims of money-grabbing corporations." O'Flaherty continued: "The very strike he writes about illustrates bitter inter-union squabbling as well as it does capitalist exploitation. It is unwise to see virtue as the exclusive property of any organized interest."

Another Canadian critic took a more favourable view of The Education of Everett Richardson. Writing in the quarterly publication Canadian Literature in 1979, Michael Greenstein noted that Cameron obviously sided with the fishermen but also presented the companies' side fairly. He added that the book was more about politics, business, religion and Nova Scotia's social structure than about Everett Richardson, who disappears from the narrative "for long stretches". Greenstein suggested that the book got too bogged down in official accounts of the strike as it dragged on in the summer of 1970. He quoted Cameron's own plea for the reader's patience: "Cherished reader, if you are bored by now I don't blame you ... If this were a novel I could wave a hand and abolish the tedium. But it's not a novel: these are real people, real events." Greenstein praised Cameron for following that plea with lively accounts of life in rural Cape Breton, but he added that he wished the book had relied more heavily on such "folk" anecdotes.

Critical opinion, however, seems to have become more favourable with the passage of time. More than 30 years after its publication, The Education of Everett Richardson attained the rank of 47th in a volume listing Atlantic Canada's 100 Greatest Books. Authors Trevor Adams and Stephen Clare based their list partly on their own judgment and partly on more than 2,000 nominations they solicited from publishers, writers, journalists, editors, booksellers, librarians, professors, teachers and readers across Canada. "Books that introduced new styles and techniques," they note, "gravitated to the top of our rankings even if they weren't the most popular." As for The Education of Everett Richardson, Adams and Clare write: "Cameron takes readers to the strike's seminal moments, giving them a real sense of the people on both sides of the conflict, and showing a keen understanding of this pivotal moment in Canadian labour history." They add that "through the lens of Atlantic Canadian history, or the labour movement, or the history of the fisheries, this is an important book. Yet few books on those subjects stand as large as The Education of Everett Richardson. That's because this book's ultimate strength is in Cameron's storytelling skills. His writing is taut, tense, and blunt, perfectly reflecting the powder-keg feel of the times."

== See also ==
- Literature of Nova Scotia
