= Silver Donald Cameron =

Canadian author and journalist (1937–2020)

Silver Donald Cameron CM ONS
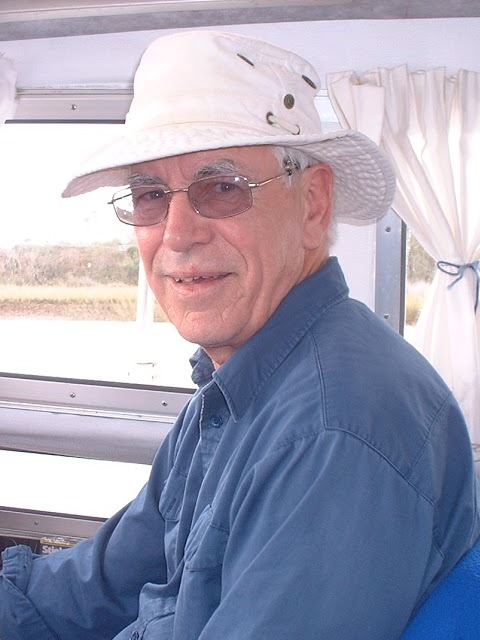
- Cameron in 2004
- Born: Donald Cameron; June 21, 1937; Toronto, Ontario, Canada
- Died: June 1, 2020 (aged 82); Halifax, Nova Scotia, Canada
- Education: University of British Columbia (BA); University of California, Berkeley (MA); University of London (PhD)
- Occupations: author, journalist
- Spouse: Marjorie Simmins
- Writing career
- Genres: Non-fiction, fiction, drama, journalism
- Subjects: Social justice, the environment and sailing
- Notable works: The Education of Everett Richardson (1977, 2019); The Prophet at Tantramar (1988); Wind, Whales and Whisky (1991); The Living Beach (1998); Sailing Away from Winter (2007)
- Notable awards: Order of Canada, Order of Nova Scotia

Silver Donald Cameron CM ONS (June 21, 1937 – June 1, 2020) was a Canadian journalist, author, playwright, and university teacher whose writing focused on social justice, nature, and the environment. His 15 books of non-fiction dealt with everything from history and politics to education and community development.

An avid sailor, Cameron wrote several books about ships and the sea. He was the author of a young adult novel and a thriller, both set in Nova Scotia where he lived for more than 40 years. Two of his books, The Education of Everett Richardson (1977 and 2019) and The Living Beach (1998), are included in Atlantic Canada's 100 Greatest Books.

Silver Donald Cameron in conversation with George Monbiot as part of the Green Interview series

Jane Goodall in conversation with Silver Donald Cameron, discussing her work

Cameron's only stage play, The Prophet at Tantramar, was about Leon Trotsky's month-long confinement in a prisoner-of-war camp in Amherst, Nova Scotia, and was also produced as a radio drama, one of more than 50 Cameron wrote for both CBC Radio and CBC Television. In addition, he produced radio and television documentaries, as well as writing and narrating two documentary films for The Green Interview, Bhutan: The Pursuit of Gross National Happiness (2010) and Salmon Wars: Salmon Farms, Wild Fish and the Future of Communities (2012).

His magazine articles numbered in the hundreds and his newspaper columns appeared in The Globe and Mail and the Halifax Chronicle Herald. He also wrote extensively for provincial and federal government departments as well as for corporate and non-profit clients.

Cameron served as writer-in-residence at two universities in Nova Scotia as well as at the University of Prince Edward Island. He was dean of the School of Community Studies at Cape Breton University and served as its first Farley Mowat Chair in Environment. He also taught at Dalhousie University, the University of British Columbia and the University of New Brunswick.

One of Cameron's last projects involved a series of video interviews with environmental thinkers, writers and activists that appeared on subscription website "The Green Interview". Interviewees include Vandana Shiva, Farley Mowat, James Lovelock, Jane Goodall and David Orton.

Cameron's writing and journalism earned him many awards, and in 2012, he was appointed as both Member of the Order of Canada (CM) and Member of the Order of Nova Scotia (ONS).

== Early life and education ==
Donald Cameron was born in 1937 in Toronto, the son of Hazel (Robertson) and Dr. Maxwell A. Cameron. He joked that, at age two, he fled to British Columbia, taking his parents with him. His father was the head of the faculty of education at UBC beginning the mid-1940s. He grew up mostly in Vancouver and attended the University of British Columbia, receiving his Bachelor of Arts degree in 1960. He earned his Master of Arts at the University of California, Berkeley in 1962 and returned to UBC to teach for two years before leaving for the University of London, where he received his Ph.D. in 1967. He based his doctoral thesis on his study of the structures in six major novels by Walter Scott. He served as a postdoctoral fellow at Dalhousie University (1967–1968) before becoming an English professor in 1968, at the University of New Brunswick.

== Career ==
While teaching at UNB, Cameron served as publisher and founding editor of The Mysterious East. During its four-year existence, the left-leaning, monthly magazine published a wide variety of articles and editorials on issues in Canada's Maritime Provinces, including everything from pollution, housing and censorship to birth control, drugs and the problems of native peoples.

In 1971, Cameron took a leave of absence from UNB and moved to D'Escousse, a village on Isle Madame, a small island off the southeastern coast of Cape Breton. He wanted to write, he missed the sea and his first marriage had ended. He arrived in Cape Breton, a divorced father of three sons and a daughter. As he told a journalist 20 years later, "Dr. Donald Cameron left his university office, drove to the village of D'Escousse, stepped into a phone booth and emerged as the award-winning author and playwright Silver Donald Cameron." (He added the name "Silver" to set himself apart from the multitudes of other Camerons. Folk-singer Tom Gallant suggested the name because Cameron's head of prematurely grey hair was his most striking feature.) Cameron settled in D'Escousse after buying a house he describes as "composed of two tiny ancient buildings pushed together to make one comfortable home." He adds that the house was "spang on the roadside, the floor plan was awkward, and it was half-renovated in a style not much to my taste. But it felt right: a serene and happy little house where generations had loved and laughed and wept and died."

Cameron had already published magazine articles and a literary book, Faces of Leacock, a 1967 study of the great Canadian humorist, but now he was finally free to begin his apprenticeship as a full-time writer. For him, D'Escousse was an ideal home base. "For a writer," Cameron writes, "the great benefit of a village is the way you can know people." He added that in cities, writers are inevitably drawn into limited circles, but villages let them escape. "My friends in D'Escousse include welders, fishermen, millwrights and mothers on welfare as well as teachers, potters, priests and businessmen." Moreover, a writer who lives in a village watches people change and grow. "An electrician becomes a politician, schoolboys become truckers and contractors, middle-aged civil servants retire and old people take their departures. Knowing them year by year, I can grasp something of the flow of their lives."

In 1973, Cameron bought an unfinished boat named Hirondelle in Lunenburg, Nova Scotia. In the book Wind, Whales and Whisky, he writes about spending the summer completing it by adding masts, toilets, compasses and handrails before sailing the 33-foot schooner back to D'Escousse. Hirondelle became the first schooner moored in D'Escousse since 1928 when Leonard Pertus sold his own boat Maple Leaf. Pertus became Cameron's tutor and mentor teaching him how to sail safely and well. Cameron dreamed of sailing across the Atlantic and, with the help of friends, began a nine-year project building a 27-foot cutter named Silversark.

== Notable books ==
=== The Education of Everett Richardson ===
In 1977, Silver Donald Cameron published The Education of Everett Richardson: The Nova Scotia Fishermen's Strike 1970–71. Portions of the book had previously appeared in three Canadian magazines, Maclean's, Saturday Night and The Mysterious East.

Everett Richardson was one of 235 trawlermen from the tiny ports of Canso, Mulgrave and Petit de Grat who fought for better pay, safer working conditions, job security and most of all, for the right to belong to the union they had chosen, the United Fishermen and Allied Workers' Union led by Homer Stevens, a member of the Communist Party of Canada. Their main adversaries were two, huge, foreign-owned fishing companies. The fishermen also faced stiff opposition from what Cameron calls the "cod aristocracy", rich members of the Nova Scotia elite, as well as from leading politicians, judges, government bureaucrats, members of the clergy, the province's main daily newspaper, and the Canadian labour establishment itself. "In the end," Cameron writes, "this is not a story of the fishermen, or even of the labour movement. It is a story about privilege and poverty and injustice in this country, and about the social and political arrangements which cheat and oppress most Canadians, which stunt our humanity and distort our environment."

After a seven-month strike and many more months of struggle, the fishermen eventually lost the right to be represented by their chosen union. However, Cameron points out that they did win collective bargaining rights for fishermen in Nova Scotia breaking centuries-old rules that prohibited them from joining unions. The strike also brought better pay and working conditions. Cameron concludes that the fishermen were both "collective heroes and martyrs, who lost the battle for themselves but won it for their brothers." He adds that the striking fishermen "changed the law, changed conditions on the boats, and left the see-saw of power balanced a little more evenly."

Shortly after the book was published, it received a hostile review in The Globe and Mail. Critic Patrick O'Flaherty complained that the book contributed to a Canadian literary atmosphere that "continues to stink of parlor radical sanctimoniousness." Two years later, critic Michael Greenstein praised the book for its even-handedness, but suggested Cameron got too bogged down in the official account of the strike and could have used more lively anecdotes to entertain his readers. However, more than 30 years after its publication,The Education of Everett Richardson attained the rank of 47th in a volume listing Atlantic Canada's 100 Greatest Books. Authors Trevor Adams and Stephen Clare write: "Cameron takes readers to the strike's seminal moments, giving them a real sense of the people on both sides of the conflict, and showing a keen understanding of this pivotal moment in Canadian labour history." They add that "through the lens of Atlantic Canadian history, or the labour movement, or the history of the fisheries, this is an important book. Yet few books on those subjects stand as large as The Education of Everett Richardson. That's because this book's ultimate strength is in Cameron's storytelling skills. His writing is taut, tense, and blunt, perfectly reflecting the powder-keg feel of the times."

=== Wind, Whales and Whisky ===
Wind, Whales and Whisky: A Cape Breton Voyage recounts Cameron's adventures as he, his wife Lulu and 12-year-old son Mark Patrick sail around Cape Breton Island on their 27-foot cutter Silversark during the summer of 1990. Cameron himself says the book is a family adventure, a portrait of Cape Breton and "an essay on values, what is it that makes a good life." The book has also been described as "a wonderfully entertaining Bruegel painting of a book—at once a travelogue, a history, a geography, a folk study, a social commentary and a book of humour." Cameron introduces his readers to a wide variety of characters that he meets during his voyage including moonshine makers, malt-whisky distillers, musicians, poets, American Buddhists, fishermen and coal miners.

Wind, Whales and Whisky uses the techniques of creative nonfiction blending facts, observations, quotes, dialogue, anecdotes and stories. On a cold day in July, for example, Cameron accompanies Fred Lawrence as he hauls his lobster traps between Money Point and Bay St. Lawrence on the northern tip of Cape Breton Island. The six-page account includes detailed descriptions of how fishermen retrieve, empty and bait their traps, how they determine which lobsters they can legally keep and how they band lobster foreclaws with "a thick, fat elastic" before dropping them into "a bin filled with circulating sea water." The episode contains information on lobster biology including mating and feeding habits as well as what is known about their migrations.

Cameron also describes how businessman John Risley discovered that lobsters "essentially go dormant in icy water" enabling his company to store them for up to a year by putting them into individual plastic trays stacked in "huge racks which reach clear to the ceilings of the cavernous holding rooms" and pumping 24,000 gallons of chilled sea-water per hour through the trays. "At that temperature", Cameron notes, "lobsters do not eat, grow or moult, but they retain their weight, their texture and their taste, drawing only on the nutrients in their blood." He adds that Risley began airlifting his steady supply of lobsters to cities all over the world transforming his company from its beginnings "as a single roadside lobster stand" into "a corporate empire".

The information about lobsters is interwoven with stories about the many shipwrecks on a nearby "killer island", how Fred Lawrence ended up moving to Cape Breton from Maine, and the dramatic traces that "ancient volcanoes, mighty glaciers, up-tilted seafloors" have left on the coastline. "The rocks have a tortured appearance", Cameron writes, "abrupt, sharp shapes, angled striations, rapid shifts of colour from pink to white, rust, green, grey, black. The geology looks like frozen violence: layers of rock bent, twisted, broken, folded, thrust upward, knocked sideways, pressed downward."

In Wind, Whales and Whisky, Cameron discusses one of the ironies he sees about life in Cape Breton. On the one hand, the island seems poor with chronic unemployment, but on the other, its rural inhabitants have access to abundant and delicious food such as apples, cranberries, fish, deer, moose and the produce from their gardens. After describing "the most unbelievably wonderful meal of the voyage"—lobster and grey sole baked in the oven with tinned mushroom soup accompanied by scalloped potatoes and broccoli, Cameron writes: "I love living in a depressed region, I thought. One lives so well." In a chapter entitled, "Good People in Bad Times", Cameron outlines the troubles of industrial Cape Breton including the long decline of two of its economic mainstays, coal mining and steel making. "It is a hard place to make a living", he writes, "but it is a wonderful place to live."

Industrial Cape Breton is raucous and funny, full of music and theatre and satire. It is gossipy and anecdotal, tolerant of eccentricity, generous and co-operative. It is tenacious, disorderly, skeptical of authority, lethal to pomposity and pretension. It is fecund, unruly and affectionate.

Newspaper reviewers praised Wind, Whales and Whisky as entertaining, joyful and informative. One, who grew up on Cape Breton Island, wrote that the book brought back many memories: "I could smell the salt and feel the warmth of those country kitchens and hear the intoxicating song of the fiddle ... There are moonshiners and poets in this book, fishermen and ghosts, Buddhist monks and singing coal miners, cock-fighters and priests. There's also a pretty good recipe for moonshine you could try if you're willing to risk $500 in fines and maybe six months in jail."

== Awards and recognition ==
His writing and journalism earned him numerous awards including the Evelyn Richardson Award, the Atlantic Provinces Booksellers Award and the City of Dartmouth Book Award. One of his television dramas won a Best Short Film award and he earned four National Magazine Awards as well as two awards for his corporate writing. In the 2012 Canadian honours, Cameron was appointed Member of the Order of Canada (CM), also being appointed Member of the Order of Nova Scotia (ONS) and awarded the Queen Elizabeth II Diamond Jubilee Medal the same year.

== Personal life ==
Cameron wrote about the Terrios, a large family in D'Escousse. One of the Terrio daughters, Marie Louise "Lulu" Terrio, had gone to Denmark the year before he moved to the village to study biochemistry at the University of Copenhagen. She became an ardent sailor in Denmark, married a Dane and gave birth to a son named Mark Patrick. When her marriage ended, she moved back to D'Escousse with her son and, "nervous as a schoolboy," Cameron asked her to help him sail his schooner to Louisbourg, Cape Breton in 1979. He writes that he fell "hopelessly in love with her" when she asked him to take the tiller, vomited over the side, "wiped her mouth, climbed back to the afterdeck and reached for the tiller." They were married in May 1980 in D'Escousse and 10 years later sailed around Cape Breton Island in Silversark, a voyage recounted in Wind, Whales and Whisky.

Lulu Terrio-Cameron died of breast cancer in April 1996. "We had 16 years of blissful happiness", Cameron told a journalist adding "it was the kind of marriage that every day I felt myself filled with wonder that I had such a person to share my life with. Every day I said a little prayer of thanks."

In 1998, at the age of 59, Cameron married the award-winning writer and journalist Marjorie Simmins. They had met four years earlier when she interviewed him in Vancouver for a profile in the University of British Columbia's alumni magazine. In her 2014 book of essays, Coastal Lives, Simmins describes their lengthy courtship and their life together in Nova Scotia after a determined Cameron finally persuaded her to leave the "extravagantly green and lush" Pacific coast rainforest she loved for the often, wild and stormy weather of Atlantic Canada. Although Cameron himself had grown up in Vancouver, Simmins knew his heart belonged to Cape Breton.

Cameron was the father of five children from two previous marriages. In his later years, he and Marjorie Simmins divided their time between Halifax and D'Escousse, Cape Breton.

== Death ==
Cameron died in a Halifax hospital on June 1, 2020, after being diagnosed with lung cancer. His death came just a few weeks before his latest non-fiction book Blood in the Water: A True Story of Revenge in the Maritimes was due to be released. The book describes the circumstances around the murder of a small-time criminal who had been terrorizing the small Cape Breton community of Petit-de-Grat for many years.

== Works ==
He is the author of numerous books, including:

- Faces of Leacock (1967) Original version, published by the Ryerson Press, is out of print. Reprinted by The Stephen Leacock Museum National Historic Site, (2005)
- Conversations with Canadian Novelists (1971) Toronto: Macmillan Canada. Volume 1, ISBN 0-7705-0942-8 Volume 2, ISBN 0-7705-1008-6
- The Education of Everett Richardson: The Nova Scotia Fishermen's Strike, 1970–71 (1977) Toronto: McClelland & Stewart ISBN 0-7710-1845-2
- Seasons in the Rain: An Expatriate's Notes on British Columbia (1978) Toronto: McClelland & Stewart ISBN 0-7710-1847-9
- The Baitchoppper (1982) Halifax: James Lorimer ISBN 088862-599-5 cloth; ISBN 978-0-88862-598-4 paper
- Outhouses of the West ISBN 1-55209-523-1 (1988) with Sherman Hines (ISBN 0-921054-07-6)
- Wind, Whales and Whisky: A Cape Breton Voyage (1991) Toronto: Macmillan Canada ISBN 0-7715-9175-6
- Sniffing the Coast: An Acadian Voyage (1993) ISBN 0-7715-9014-8
- The Living Beach (1998) Toronto: Macmillan Canada ISBN 0-7715-7639-0
- The Living Beach: Life, Death and Politics where the Land Meets the Sea (2014) Markham, ON: ISBN 978-0-88995-509-7
- Sailing Away from Winter: A Cruise from Nova Scotia to Florida and Beyond (2007) Toronto: McClelland & Stewart ISBN 978-0-7710-1842-8
- Warrior Lawyers: From Manila to Manhattan, Attorneys for the Earth (2016) Halifax: Paper Tiger Enterprises Ltd. ISBN 978-0-9952338-0-5
- Blood in the Water: A True Story of Revenge in the Maritimes (2020) Viking: ISBN 978-0-7352-3805-3
