= Grandique Point Lighthouse =

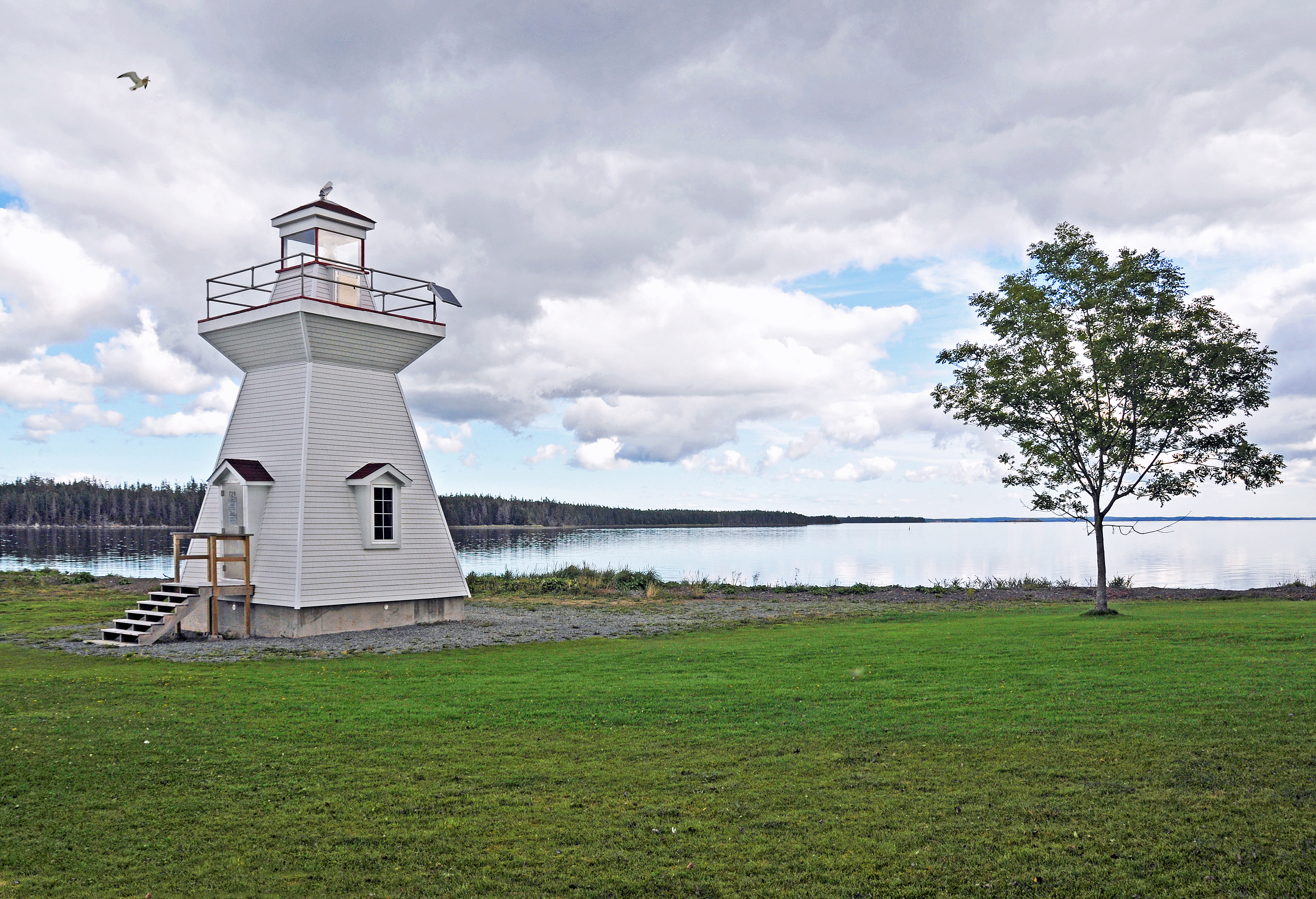
- Grandique Point Lighthouse
- Location: Lennox Passage Provincial Park, Isle Madame, Nova Scotia
- Coordinates: 45°35′36.6″N 61°01′20.3″W

Tower
- Constructed: 1884 (first)
- Construction: wooden tower (current) pole (first)
- Automated: 1961
- Height: 9.5 metres (31 ft)
- Shape: square pyramidal tower with gallery and lantern
- Markings: white tower with red lantern and trim
- Operator: Canadian Coast Guard

Light
- First lit: 1906 (current)
- Focal height: 9.2 metres (30 ft)
- Lens: 6th order dioptric, fixed red
- Range: 7.0 nautical miles (13.0 km; 8.1 mi)
- Characteristic: LFl G 6s. (flash 2 sec; eclipse 4 sec) Operates at night only, seasonal

Grandique Point Lighthouse (also known as 'Grandique Ferry Lighthouse') is an aid to navigation for Lennox Passage, which is the channel of water between the southern shore of Cape Breton Island and Isle Madame, Nova Scotia, Canada. The lighthouse is located on the beach at Grandique Point in Lennox Passage Provincial Park and is accessible by a gravel road within the provincial park. The site is open to the public, the tower is closed.

== The first light ==
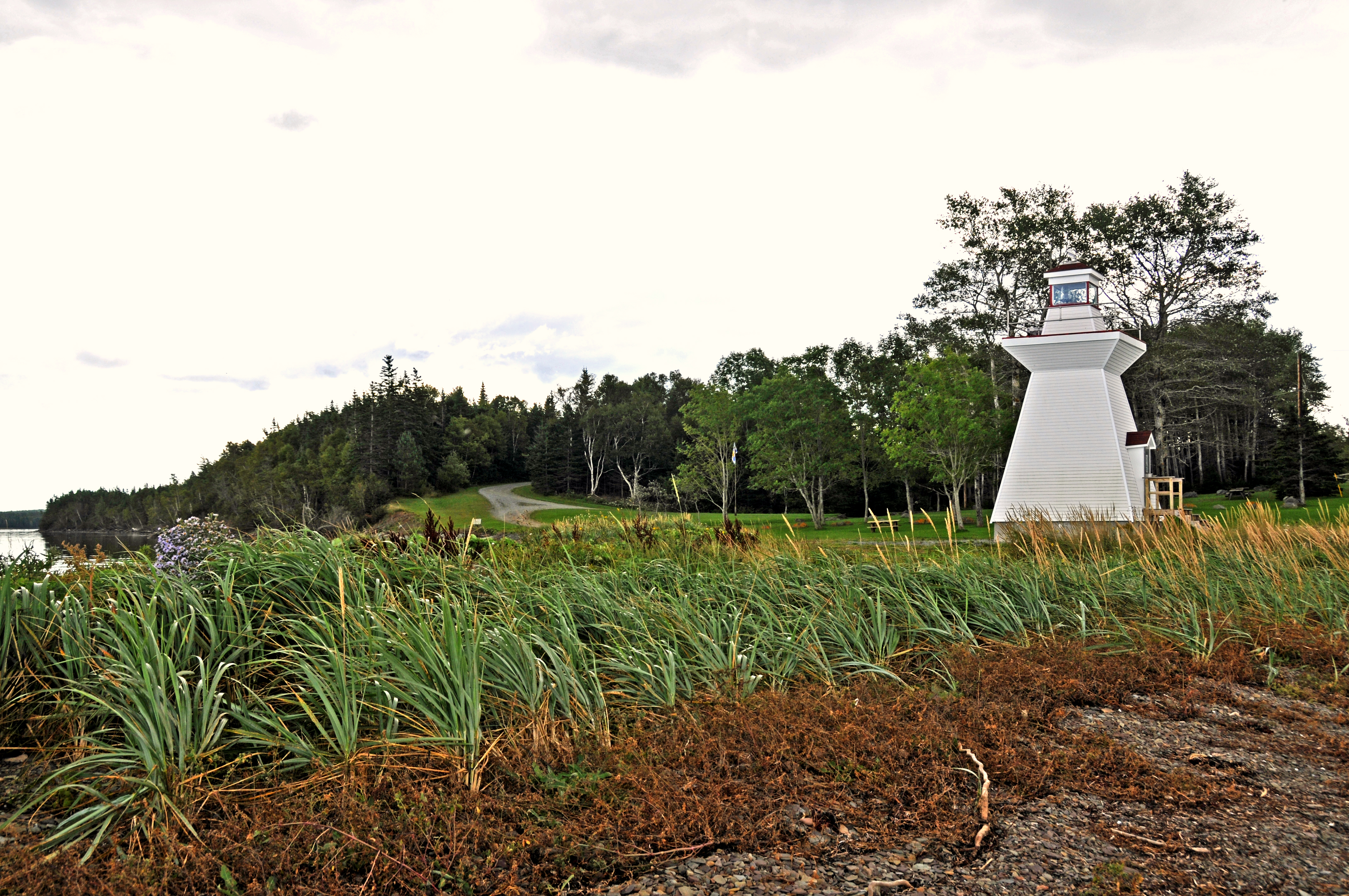
Grandique Point Lighthouse

The first Grandique Point Light, a pole light, was established at Grand Dique Beach in 1884 (the spelling 'Grandique' didn't become official until 1956). After the opening of the St. Peters Canal, Lennox Passage saw an increase in marine traffic. For safety reasons, lights were established along the route. The first lightkeeper at Grand Dique was Daniel Clough, appointed at $54 per year. Daniel Clough was the son of the merchant Nathaniel Cough, a recipient of one of the first Crown Land grants on Isle Madame.

This first light showed a fixed red light from a small lantern hoisted atop a 7.2 metres (24 ft) pole, with a small white shed at the base for daytime storage of the light and associated materials.

In the late 1800s the lighthouse was flanked by docks for limestone and plaster quarries and quays for the Isle Madame farmers to bring their produce and livestock to market. There was also a passenger ferry that landed on Grandique Pointe quite near the lighthouse. Many of these features can still be seen today.

Due to erosion at the Grandique spit of land, the pole light was moved in 1900.

== The lighthouse today ==
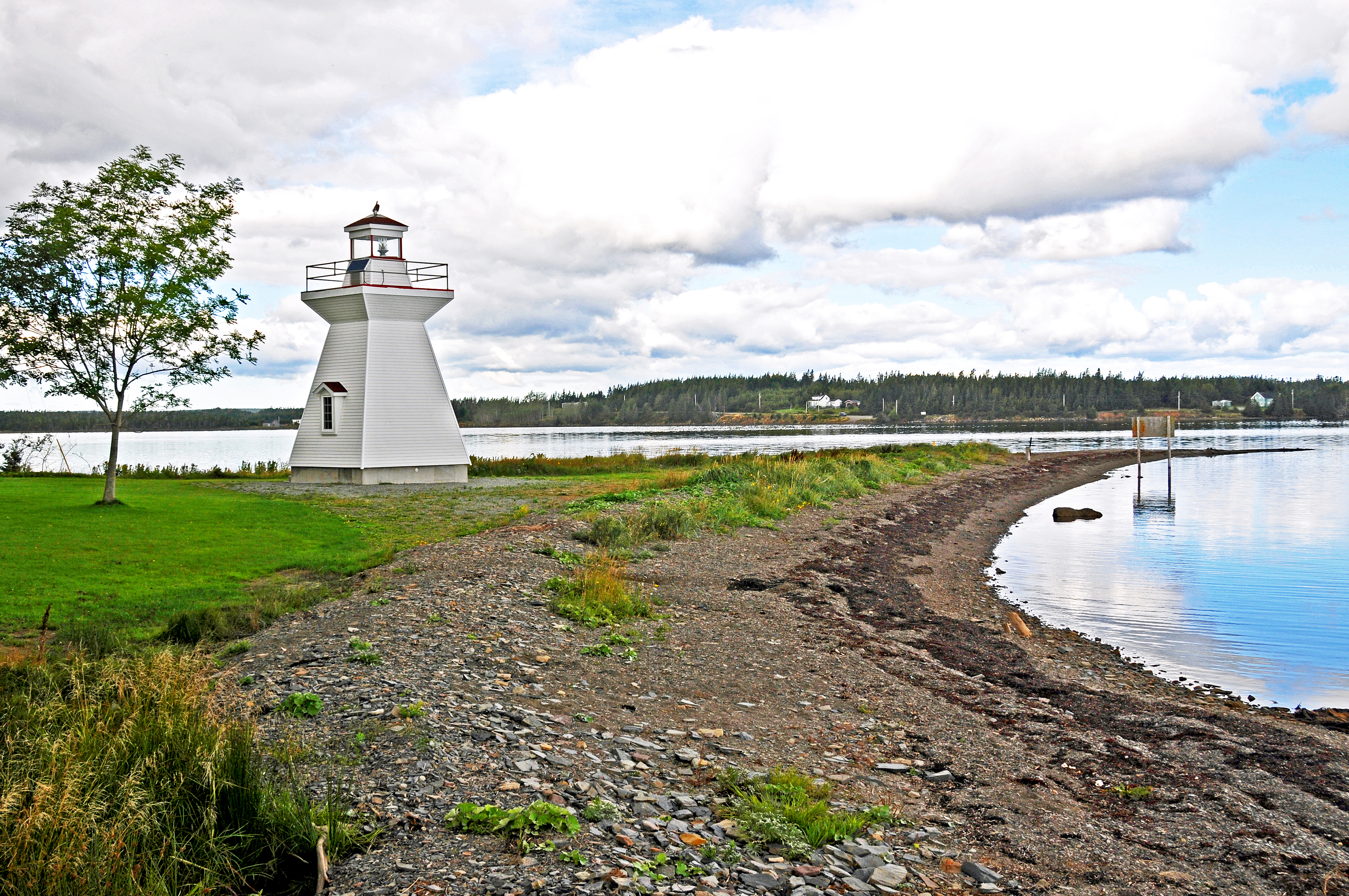
Grandique Point Lighthouse

In 1906 the decision was made to build a proper lighthouse at Grandique Point. Constructed under contract by Lawrence Mury of West Arichat for the price or $452, the new light was ready for the opening of navigation in 1907. From 1922 to 1941 the light had a 6th order dioptric lens, showing a fixed red light, with a range of 7 nautical miles (13 km; 8.1 mi) and was seasonal in operation, maintained from April to January.

By October, 1961 the light had been electrified and automated, running off a 6 volt battery system (5 large single cells) equipped with a flasher and a sun switch to turn the light on and off, maintained by a caretaker. In 1963, due to storm damage and beach erosion the light had to be moved again, about 15 metres (49 ft) southward. When commercial power was connected to the light in 1977 the light became seasonal, maintained from May 1 to December 15.

In the winter of 2010, the lighthouse was moved to its present location. The light shows as a 2 second long green flash, every 6 seconds, then dark for 4 seconds, with a range of 7 nautical miles (13 km; 8.1 mi), and operates at night only, seasonally.

The last lightkeeper at Grandique was Stanley Forgeron who took over in 1960. Forgeron oversaw the conversion to an automated light in 1961 and became a caretaker.

=== Lightkeepers at Grandique Point ===
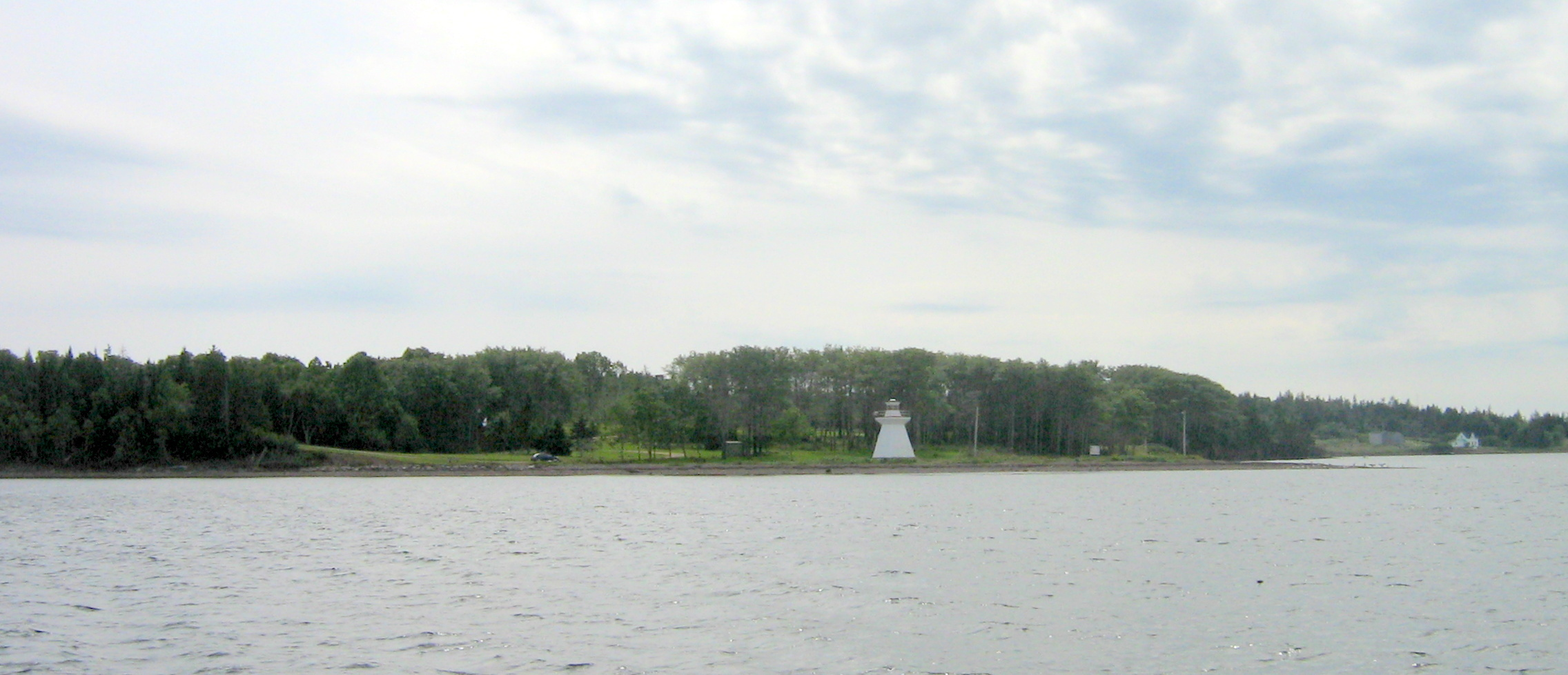
Lennox Passage Provincial Park and the historic Grandique Point Lighthouse

- Daniel Clough 1884-1908
- D A Kaulbach 1908-1909
- C A Kaulbach 1909-1919
- Charles Shannon 1909-1923
- John Doiron
- Henry Young
- Melvin Shannon 1939-1960
- Stanley Forgeron 1960-1961
- Stanley Forgeron (as caretaker) 1961-1968

== See also ==
- List of lighthouses in Canada
