= Lennox Passage Provincial Park =

Provincial park in Nova Scotia, Canada

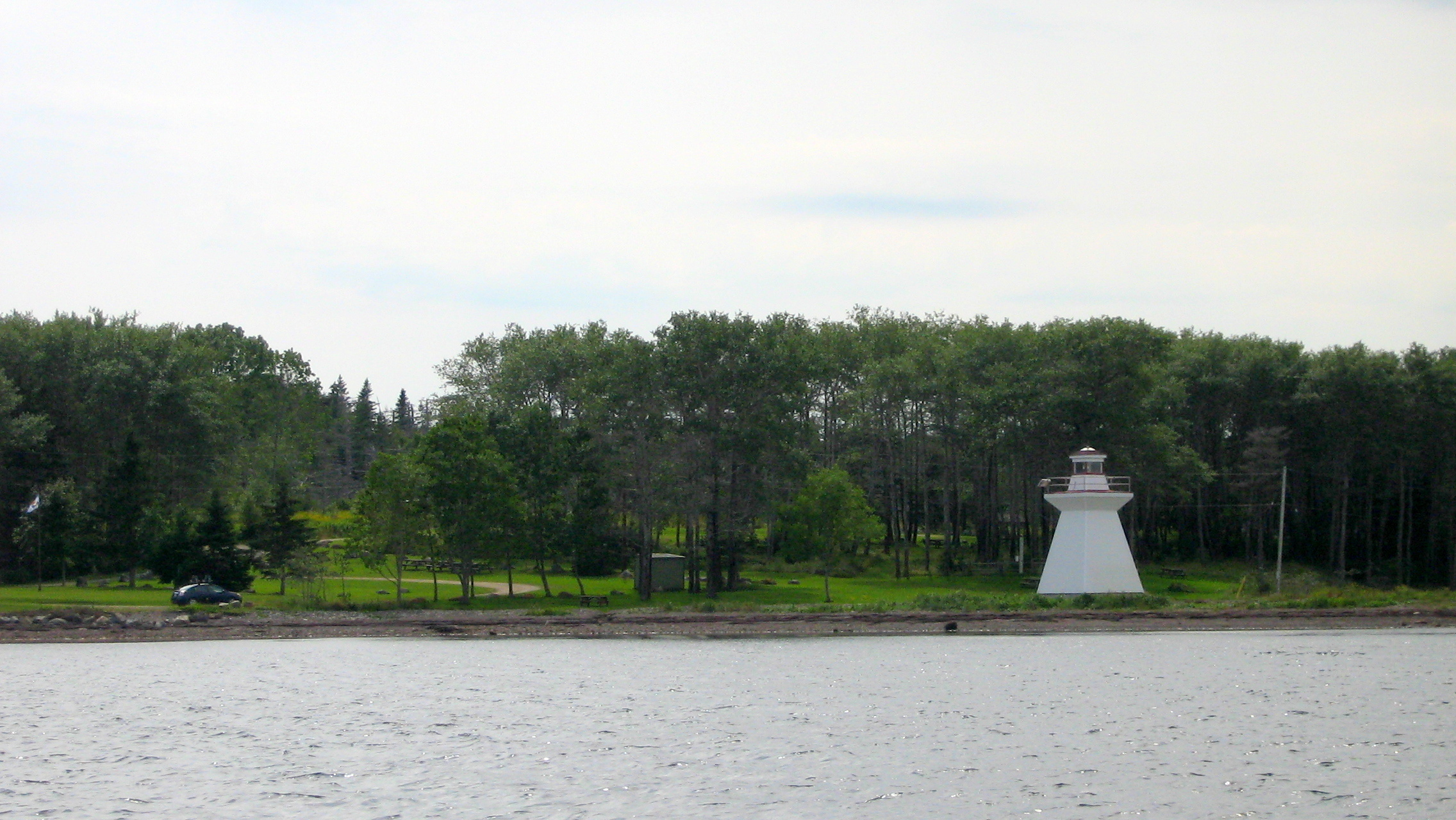
- Lennox Passage Provincial Park and Grandique Point Lighthouse
- Interactive map of Lennox Passage Provincial Park
- Type: Provincial park
- Location: 2313 Hwy 320, Isle Madame, Cape Breton Island, Nova Scotia, Canada
- Nearest city: Lennox, Nova Scotia
- Coordinates: 45°35′33″N 61°01′18″W
- Area: 37.11 hectares (91.7 acres)
- Created: March 12, 1985
- Operator: Nova Scotia Provincial Parks, a branch of the Nova Scotia Department of Natural Resources
- Open: May 18 to Oct 8, closes each day one hour after sunset
- Status: Designated, Operational
- Website: Lennox Passage Provincial Park

Lennox Passage Provincial Park is a small picnic and beach park on the shores of Lennox Passage on the North Shore of Isle Madame on Cape Breton Island, Nova Scotia, with 2 kilometres (1.2 mi) of shoreline, an operating lighthouse and site of a former post office (c. 1910), ferry terminal and two limestone quarries. Visitors can picnic at tables scattered through a forest and open areas, enjoy the 2 kilometres (1.2 mi) of trails, or explore the working lighthouse. In summer the park offers swimming, kayaking, and biking opportunities. There are snowshoeing and cross-country skiing opportunities in the winter, however parking is available at the gate only in the off-season.

The park is located on Hwy 320, 5 kilometres (3.1 mi) east of the junction of Routes 320 and 206. Lennox Passage Provincial Park was established by Order in Council (OIC 85-227) on March 12, 1985.

== Grandique Point Lighthouse ==
Located in the park is the historic Grandique Point Lighthouse.

=== History ===
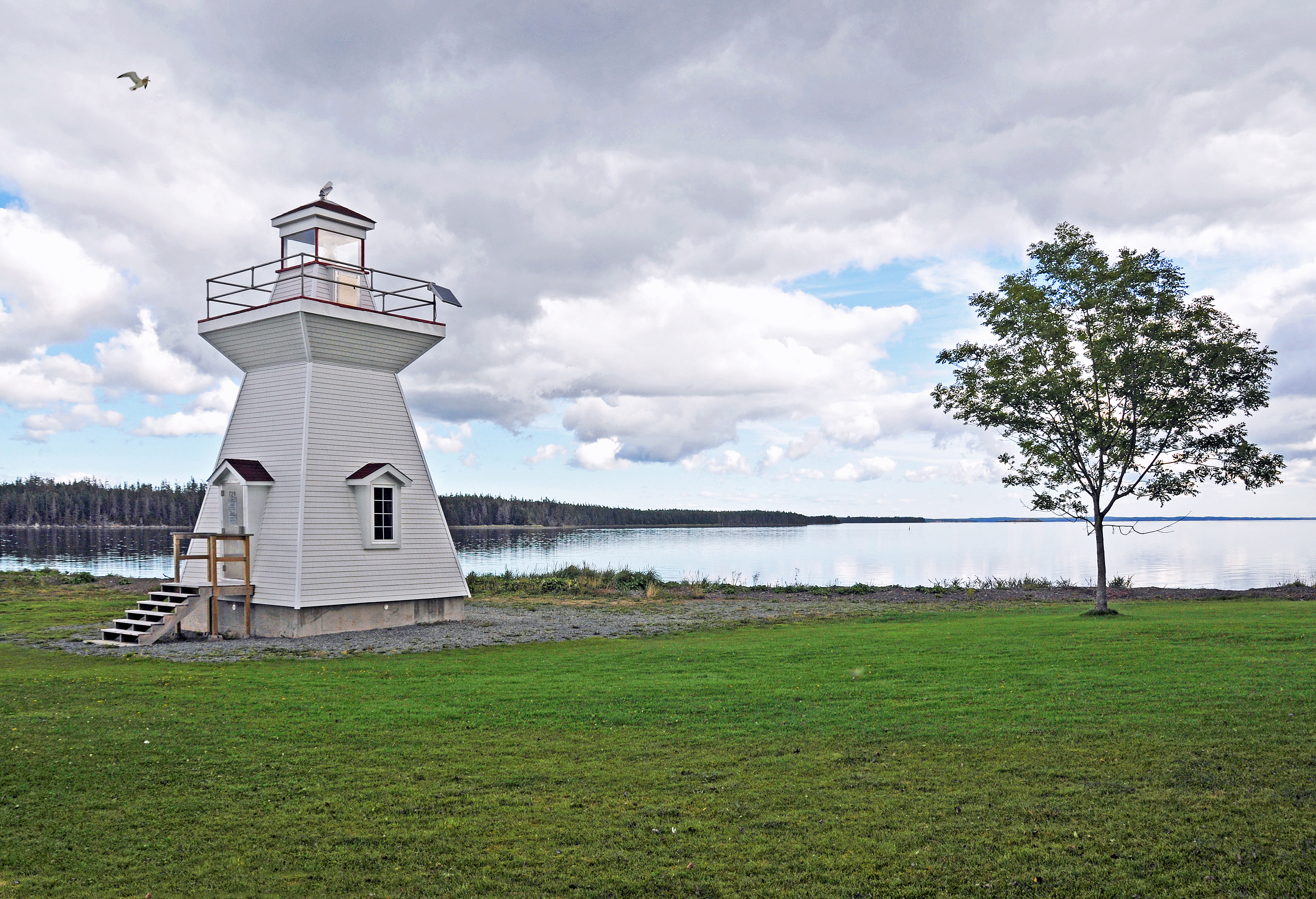
Grandique Point Lighthouse

The first Grandique Point Light, also known as Grandique Ferry Light, a pole light, was established at Grandique in 1884. After the opening of the St. Peters Canal, Lennox Passage saw an increase in marine traffic. For safety reasons, lighthouses were established along the route. The first lightkeeper was Daniel Clough, son of the merchant Nathaniel Cough, a recipient of one of the first Crown Land grants on Isle Madame. In the late 1800s the lighthouse was flanked by docks for limestone and plaster quarries and quays for the Isle Madame farmers to bring their produce and livestock to market. There was also a passenger ferry that landed on Grandique Pointe quite near the lighthouse. Many of these features can still be seen today.

Due to erosion at the Grandique spit of land, the pole light was moved in 1900 and in 1906 a proper lighthouse was built. Storm damage caused the Grandique Point lighthouse to be moved for a second time. In the winter of 2010, the lighthouse was moved to its present location.

The last lightkeeper at Grandique was Stanley Forgeron who took over in 1960. In 1961 Forgeron oversaw the conversion to an automated light in 1961 and became caretaker.

=== Lightkeepers at Grandique Point ===
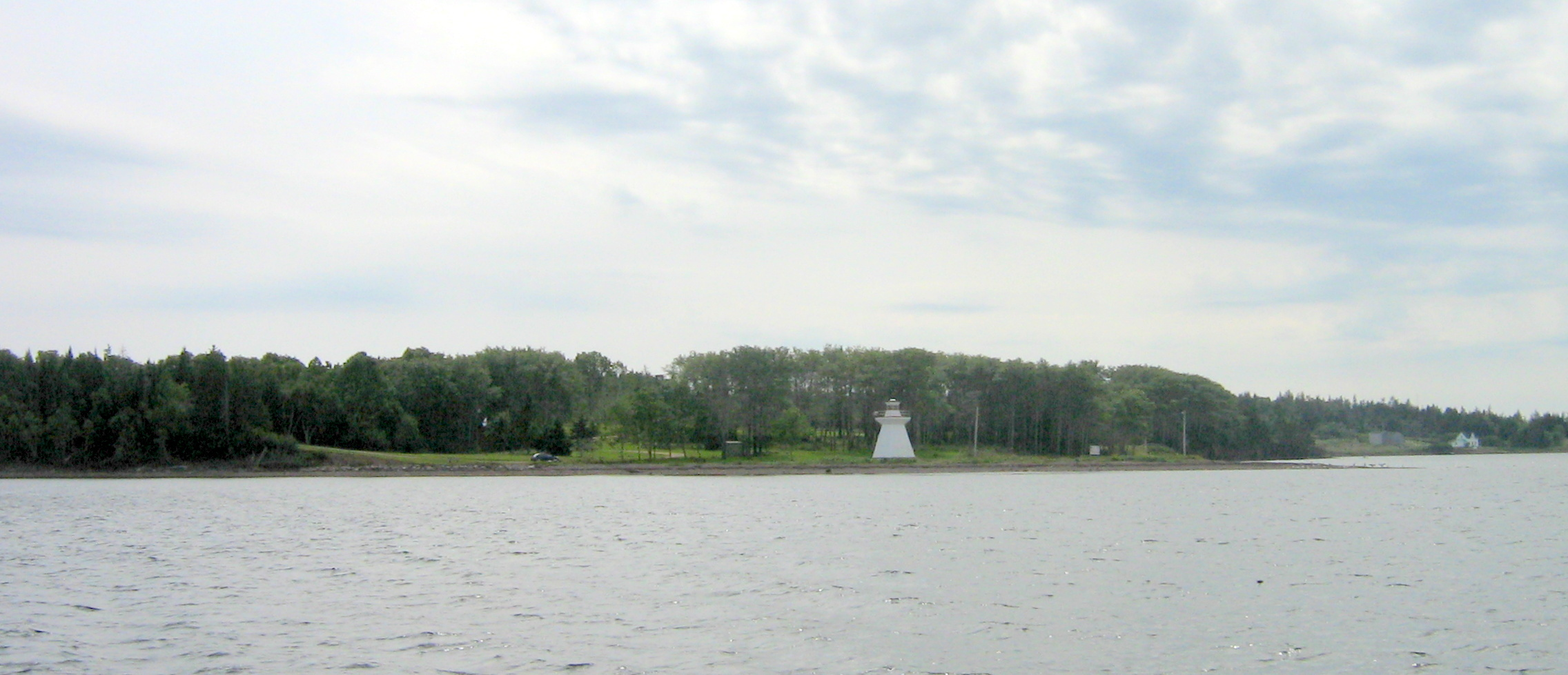
Lennox Passage Provincial Park and the historic Grandique Point Lighthouse

- Daniel Clough 1884-1908
- D A Kaulbach 1908-1909
- C A Kaulbach 1909-1919
- Charles Shannon 1909-1923
- John Doiron
- Henry Young
- Melvin Shannon 1939-1960
- Stanley Forgeron 1960-1961
- Stanley Forgeron (as caretaker) 1961-1968
