= Sainte Marie, Nova Scotia =

Community in Nova Scotia, Canada

Coordinates: 45°32′30.14″N 61°5′44.98″W

Sainte Marie in Nova Scotia

Sainte Marie is a small village in Isle Madame, in the province of Nova Scotia, located in Richmond County.
