= Alderney Point, Nova Scotia =

Community in Nova Scotia, Canada

Coordinates: 45°30′40.17″N 61°0′46.5″W

Alderney Point in Nova Scotia

Alderney Point is a community in the Canadian province of Nova Scotia, located in Isle Madame in Richmond County.
