= Cap La Ronde =

Community in Nova Scotia, Canada

Coordinates: 45°34′19.18″N 60°54′14.08″W

Cap La Ronde in Nova Scotia

Cap La Ronde is a small community in the Canadian province of Nova Scotia, located in Richmond County on Isle Madame.
