= Poirierville =

Community in Nova Scotia, Canada

Coordinates: 45°34′44.7″N 60°55′34.42″W

Poirierville in Nova Scotia

Poirierville is a small community in the Canadian province of Nova Scotia, located in Richmond County on Isle Madame.
