= Lochside, Nova Scotia =

Community in Nova Scotia, Canada

Coordinates: 45°32′32.74″N 60°58′49.7″W

Lochside in Nova Scotia

Lochside is a small community in the Canadian province of Nova Scotia, located in Richmond County on Isle Madame.
