= Boudreauville =

Community in Nova Scotia, Canada

Coordinates: 45°30′29.78″N 60°58′0.26″W

Boudreauville in Nova Scotia

Boudreauville is a small community in the Canadian province of Nova Scotia, located in Richmond County on Isle Madame.
