= Lennox, Nova Scotia =

Locality in Nova Scotia, Canada

Coordinates: 45°35′8.49″N 61°1′29.76″W

Lennox in Nova Scotia

Lennox is a locality in the Canadian province of Nova Scotia, located on Isle Madame in Richmond County.

== Parks ==
- Burnt Island Provincial Park
- Lennox Passage Provincial Park
