= John Janvrin =

Cape Breton businessman

John Janvrin (29 August 1762 – 22 December 1835) was a businessman, politician, militia officer, and justice of the peace in Canada.

Born in Jersey, Janvrin sailed to Isle Madame, Nova Scotia, in order there to manage Philip and Francis Janvrin and Company, his brothers' business. He then established his own business, John Janvrin and Company, in fishing and retail on Cape Breton Island.

Janvrin held a number of offices during his time in Cape Breton. He was a member of the Executive Council, a Lieutenant-Colonel in the militia, and a justice of the peace.

Janvrin Island belonged to John Janvrin at one point and is now named after him.

While carrying on his various commercial activities after his 1815 return to Jersey, Janvrin became increasingly interested in banking and brokerage. This led to interests in London, and there is reference in correspondence to "John Janvrin & Co. of the city of London." He was also a partner in the London brokers DeLisle, Janvrin, and DeLisle. As time went on, the Janvrin family began moving out of mercantile trade into banking and brokerage in London and on Jersey. Around the middle of the 19th century it concentrated its energies and capital in that sector of the economy.
