= Marjorie Simmins =

Canadian writer, journalist and teacher (born 1959)

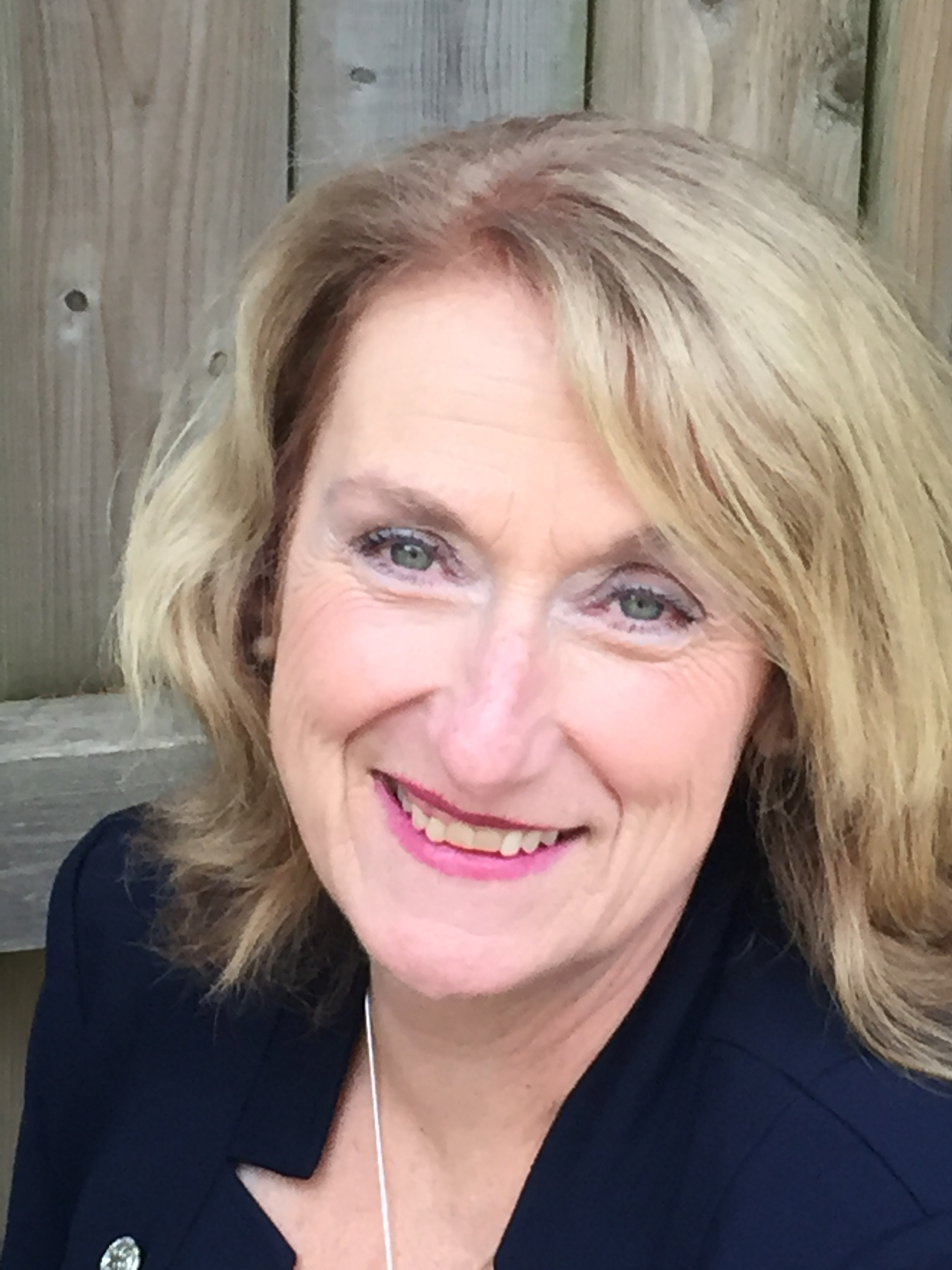
- Simmins in 2017
- Born: February 17, 1959 (age 67); Ottawa, Ontario, Canada
- Education: University of British Columbia, Mount Saint Vincent University
- Occupations: Writer, journalist, teacher.
- Spouse: Silver Donald Cameron
- Writing career
- Period: 1991 to present
- Genres: Memoir, Essay, Journalism
- Notable works: Coastal Lives (2014); Year of the Horse (2016); Memoir: Conversations and Craft (2020); Somebeachsomewhere: The Harness Racing Legend from a One-Horse Stable (2021); In Search of Puffins: Stories of Loss, Light and Flight (2025)

Marjorie Simmins (born February 17, 1959) is a Canadian writer, journalist and teacher. She is the author of four books of non-fiction that blend personal essays, memoir and journalism to explore themes of love and loss, the lure of the sea and her lifelong passion for horses. A fifth book on memoir writing includes interviews with prominent authors who practise the craft and is intended to serve as a guide for those who wish to tell their own stories.

Simmins's writing has appeared in many newspapers and magazines including the Vancouver Sun, The Chronicle-Herald, Canadian Living, Halifax Magazine, Saltscapes, The Antigonish Review and Fishermen's News.

Her work has won several awards including gold medals at the National Magazine Awards and the Atlantic Journalism Awards and in 2020, she won the Established Artist Recognition Award from Arts Nova Scotia.

Simmins has taught memoir-writing in workshops across Canada and online.

She was married to the Canadian writer Silver Donald Cameron for 22 years until his death in 2020. He is a vivid presence in her memoir writing and many of her essays.

== Early years and education ==
Marjorie Simmins was born in Ottawa, the youngest of four children of Barbara Simmins (née Atkinson) and Richard Beaufort Simmins. The family moved to Vancouver, British Columbia where Simmins was raised. Her father served as Director of the Vancouver Art Gallery before her parents divorced. Barbara Simmins began working as a night-time taxi driver to sustain the household and look after their four children before earning an education degree and becoming a high school teacher.

In 1972, when Simmins was 12, her mother bought a registered half-Arabian pony, the beginning of Simmins's lifelong love of horses and her interest in writing about them. According to Simmins, her mother hoped the big pony would help her 17-year-old sister Karin, who had been diagnosed with drug-induced schizophrenia, to avoid using barbiturates and heroin. Simmins writes that she and her sister became inseparable while training and riding the horse on trails and beaches, taking lessons and entering schooling shows and, as they progressed, registered shows. Karin's mental disorder worsened, she became increasingly violent, and in 1974, she died of a drug overdose at age 20. A grief-stricken Simmins sold the horse.

In an interview with the Writers' Federation of Nova Scotia, Simmins said writing came naturally for her. She wrote letters, mainly to family members, from the age of six or seven and started writing journals when she was 12, so it was "a natural transition from letter and journal writing, to personal essays. It took no time at all to understand that the pronoun 'I' had greatest interest and biggest heart if connected to 'we' or the universal experience."

In 1984, Simmins earned a Bachelor's Degree in English Literature from the University of British Columbia. In 2011, she completed a Research Master's Degree in Literacy Education at Mount Saint Vincent University after submitting a thesis on memoir writing as a renegade genre. She holds a Certificate in Adult Education from Dalhousie University.

== Journalism ==
In 1991, Simmins began a career as a freelance writer and reporter publishing her work in Canadian newspapers with regular work for the Vancouver Sun as well as magazines including Canadian Living and Fishermen's News based in Seattle, Washington covering commercial and sports fishing on Canada's Pacific coast for six years. She also wrote personal essays such as "Trips From There to Here" about her troubled sister Karin. That essay was published by Saturday Night magazine and won a gold medal at the 1994 National Magazine Awards.

After moving to Cape Breton, Nova Scotia to join her husband, the writer, Silver Donald Cameron, Simmins continued freelance writing for such publications as the Halifax Chronicle-Herald, Halifax Magazine and Saltscapes magazine.

Her 2019 article for Saltscapes on the loving partnership between the musician Matt Minglewood and his wife, Babs, won a gold medal at the 2020 Atlantic Journalism Awards (AJAs) for arts and entertainment reporting. Her 2011 piece for Progress Magazine on the comedian Shaun Majumder's plan to build an eco-hotel with a five-star restaurant in his tiny hometown of Burlington, Newfoundland, also won a gold medal at the AJAs.

== Non-fiction books ==
"In 2009, after being a professional writer for nearly twenty years, I was surprised to find I had not yet published a book of any kind," Simmins writes in her book on memoir writing. That year she enrolled in a master's degree program at Mount Saint Vincent University in Halifax where she intended to study memoir and use her thesis as the basis for a published book. Memoir made sense, she writes, because of all the letters, journals and essays she had published over the years, all using variations of "my direct-to-the reader voice -- which enabled me to be candid and personal as though talking to a good friend, and yet, conversely, somehow gave me enough artistic distance to craft a story."

=== Coastal Lives: A Memoir ===
In 2014, three years after completing her master's thesis, Simmins published Coastal Lives: A Memoir. The book includes essays, many published previously in Canadian magazines and newspapers, and brief stories about personal friendships and family relationships. The book's title refers to writers living on opposite Canadian coasts who meet, fall in love and marry: Simmins herself, who vows never to leave her beloved Pacific coast, and Silver Donald Cameron, "a cussedly stubborn man," whose heart belongs to Cape Breton Island on the stormy North Atlantic.

I believe that our times in history, anyone's time in history, is only as special as the people who come and go in it, and the places you are able to call home.

– From Coastal Lives: A Memoir.

One reviewer wrote of the book: "Simmins's intense culture shock in hurling herself from the life of a single urban Vancouver writer into a rural Cape Breton 'kitchen racket' culture demonstrates the plurality of Canadian solitudes. 'Learning a first language for the second time is even stranger,' she writes of coming to terms with Cape Breton idioms."

However, in The Antigonish Review, Marq de Villiers felt that the contrasts Simmins draws between Cape Breton and B.C. were not persuasive. "The sense of wonder she expresses at the differences seems wide-eyed and oddly parochial; a skillful and experienced journalist, as she was, should surely have been more worldly than that." Overall though, he praises the deftness of her touch in recounting the love affair at the heart of her story without being defensive about her 22-year age difference with Cameron and avoiding mawkishness, petty resentment and self-effacement in conveying the "looming presence" of his late wife Lulu and Cameron's intense grief at her untimely death.

Nova Scotia writer, Harry Thurston found that Simmins's essays explore "a wide emotional territory" and that the book "is an inward journey into the depths and shallows of love and loss, an emotional landscape as complex and winding as the two coastlines where the drama of her personal life plays out."

=== Year of the Horse: A Journey of Healing and Adventure ===
Simmins's second book, Year of the Horse: A Journey of Healing and Adventure, is an autobiographical work that was published in 2016, five years after she suffered disabling injuries in a horseback riding accident that left her temporarily unable to walk. After three years of therapy and recovery, Simmins decides to ride again and to train for competition in a horse show. Her decision coincides with the Chinese Year of the Horse in 2014.

As her recovery and training continue, Simmins recalls vivid memories, telling stories about the many horses she has known as well as the people who have touched her deeply. One reviewer compared her book to a "slow-burning candle" and added that, "the warmth of Simmins's stories carry us through those dark desolate times when optimism and hope seem so faint."

Writing in The Antigonish Review, Marion Quednau saw the book as a story of love and discovery as Simmins moves from youthful, horse-riding exuberance to her sudden realization in mid-life that she can form a partnership with a horse by "listening" to its needs as one listens to a human partner to find the basis for loyalty, trust and love. "What this book describes best is that love is complicated, and for most of us, happily, we have no choice but to stay engaged, wistful or enraged, fearful or unwilling, until we get it --- the fleeting, hard-won sensation of being in sync with the edges of the unknown, beautiful in motion, constantly in change."

In 2016, Simmins told an interviewer that the book is not just for people who ride horses. "Whether you ride horses or not...this book is intended to give you the best seat in the house, atop one of the world's most elegant and swift creatures."

=== In Search of Puffins: Stories of Loss, Light and Flight ===
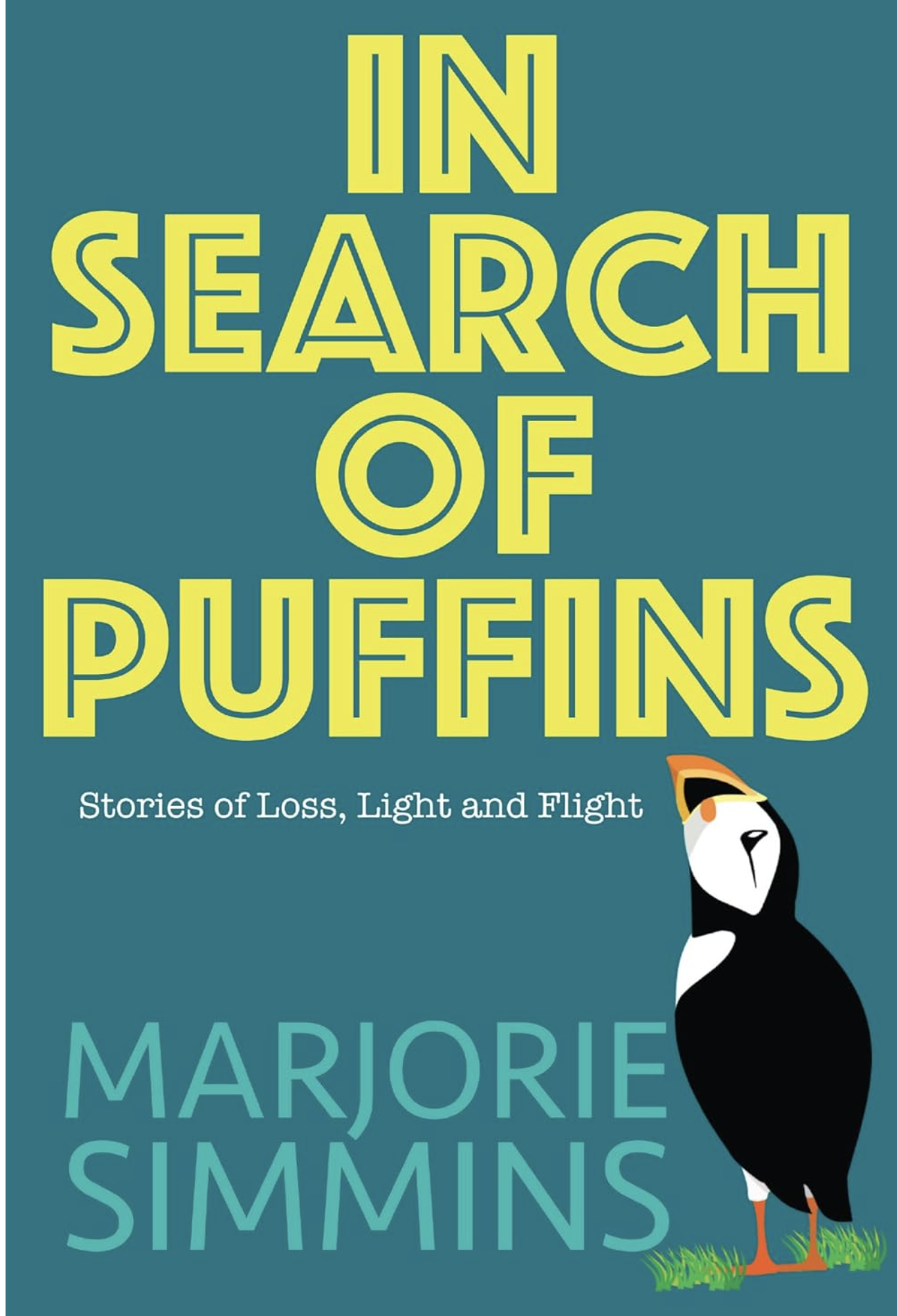

In 2025, Simmins published her third book of memoirs in which she writes about the death of her husband Silver Donald Cameron on June 1, 2020. The book tells of her struggles to cope with deep grief while also reinventing herself in a new life on her own. "This book is written to honour Silver Donald and the last chapters of my life with him. It also honours those who have lost loved ones, those who went down deep with their loss, but were able to rise eventually," she told an interviewer for a local paper on Cape Breton Island.

In the book, Simmins recounts how she went in search of the elusive puffin on June 21, 2024, Cameron's birthday and how her late husband's spirit visited her on the boat tour, if ever so briefly, from his world beyond hers. "Puffins, they're like little bird dreams whirring from rocks to ocean, ocean to rocks, secure in their two worlds," she writes. "They're where they need to be, when they need to be, tuxedo-clad sharp, humour and love their daily expressions."

In his review of the book, Nova Scotia journalist Alec Bruce observes that Silver Donald Cameron "wrote passionately about the people and places of Atlantic Canada" in "more than 20 books and countless articles, plays and documentaries." Bruce notes that in her memoir, "Simmins picks up the thread of that legacy and weaves it into something rare -- a memoir that refuses easy sentiment and instead confronts love, loss and survival with grace and grit. This is her most intimate book to date. And also, perhaps, her most necessary."

=== Somebeachsomewhere: The Harness Racing Legend from a One-Horse Stable ===
Simmins's 2021 book tells the improbable story of a Standardbred race horse named Somebeachsomewhere that Brent MacGrath, a car salesman from small town Truro, Nova Scotia, bought in 2006 for only $40,000 at a yearling auction in Lexington, Kentucky. MacGrath made the purchase on behalf of Schooner Stables, a syndicate of six Maritimers from Nova Scotia and New Brunswick. Simmins writes that the sixteen-month-old bay colt would turn out to have a body like a locomotive. "For Schooner Stables, he would be the horse of a lifetime --- and would change the course of Standardbred horse history forever," she writes.

Somewheresomebeach was almost undefeated, winning 20 of 21 races, earning more than $3.2 million and setting four world records. At the time of his death from cancer in January 2018, the world-champion Hall of Famer had sired Standardbreds who won more than $84.6 million in prizes.

Simmins told an interviewer in 2021 that the six owners were regular people pursuing a hobby. "After the briefest time, they realized they had a genius horse," she added. "Brent McGrath actually quit work and became the full-time trainer during the horse's second year of racing. It was just one bit of magic after another. He broke records every time he went on the track."

The book delves into the history and lore of harness racing and includes interviews with a wide range of professionals, but Simmins says she tried to write for both harness-racing aficionados and those with little knowledge of the sport. "It's a real writerly challenge to get that right tone where you're not going to bore the harness racing person and you're not going to lose the person who plays golf."

== Memoir-writing book ==
In 2020, Simmins published Memoir: Conversations and Craft, a book that blends information on memoir writing in its various forms, tips for those who wish to tell their own stories and interviews with seven prominent Canadian writers on the art and craft of creating a memoir.

Memoir is a renegade genre. If memoir were a fish, it would dart past your hand when you reached out to touch it. It's not meant to be caught, only to swim against currents of accepted form.

– From Memoir: Conversations and Craft

The book begins by distinguishing between memoir, "a chapter in a person's life" and autobiography, a form that "covers a whole life." Simmins writes that successful memoirs are entertaining, truthful and detailed as they explore universal themes using humour, dialogue and a narrative arc --- a beginning, middle and end that move through stages of increasing tension to "a satisfying resolution." She writes that memoir writers need a "climax (or epiphany) near the end of the story."

The writers whose interviews appear in the book are: Lawrence Hill, Plum Johnson, Linden MacIntyre, Edmund Metatawabin, Donna Morrissey, Claire Mowat and Diane Schoemperlen. Simmins follows each interview with sections that summarize key points on craft and suggest exercises designed to sharpen writing skills.

Simmins's book serves as a supplement to the workshops on memoir writing that she teaches across Canada and online. It also enlarges on her master's thesis in which she wrote: "In my teaching of memoir, to seniors and people of all ages, I have seen a uniform intensity of desire to begin writing – and muted interest in posterity. People either burn with story, their fingertips tingling with words to get down on paper – and often, a central one, such as the death of a child, a wartime or countryside childhood – or they do not. Now, more than ever, the world of memoir belongs to anyone, of any age, who for any reason, needs to record details of their life."
