= CIMC-TV =

Television station in Isle Madame

Coordinates: 45°30′50.04″N 61°0′54″W

- Isle Madame, Nova Scotia; Canada
- Channels: Analog: 10 (VHF)
- Branding: Telile

Programming
- Affiliations: Independent station

Ownership
- Owner: Telile

History
- Founded: 1994 (on cable)
- First air date: June 2002
- Call sign meaning: Canada Isle Madame Community TV

Links
- Website: Telile

CIMC-TV, branded as Telile, is a community channel based in Arichat, Nova Scotia, broadcasting on channel 10 over the air, and cable channels 4 (on EastLink Cable), and 63 (Seaside Cable). On January 12, 2013, the station was also added by Bell TV, airing on channel 536.

The station's programming is in English and French.
