= Petit-de-Grat Island =

Island in the country of Canada

Coordinates: 45°30′4.5″N 60°56′33.1″W

Petit-de-Grat Island is a Canadian island off the coast of Cape Breton Island, in Richmond County, Nova Scotia. The island's main community is Petit-de-Grat. The first settlers came from the Basque region of Spain in 1714. Petit-de-Grat Island is connected by causeway to neighbouring Isle Madame.
