= Lennox Passage (waterway) =

- Lennox Passage in Nova Scotia
- Location: Cape Breton Island, Nova Scotia
- Coordinates: 45°34′54″N 61°05′12″W
- Type: Strait
- Part of: Atlantic ocean
- Max. length: 10 nautical miles (19 km)

Lennox Passage is a navigable waterway between Cape Breton Island and Isle Madame in Nova Scotia, Canada. Small craft use the relatively protected Passage (also correctly referred to as a strait) traveling to and from St. Peters Canal at the village of St. Peter's and the Strait of Canso to avoid sailing around the east coast of Cape Breton in the open Atlantic Ocean.

The Passage is approximately 10 nautical miles (19 km) in length from MacDonalds Shoal (near Janvrin Island) to Ouetique Island near D'Escousse with depths varying from 3 to 20 metres. The Passage is well-buoyed and marine interests should be aware that eastbound vessels leave the green buoys to starboard while making their way towards St. Peter's.

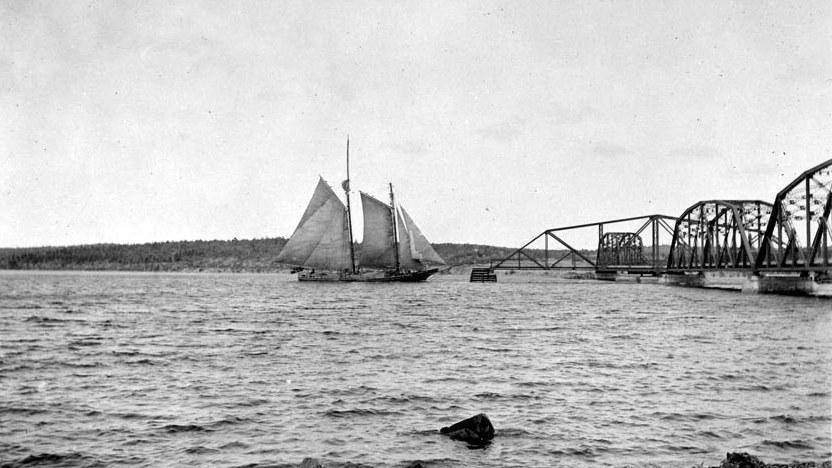
Lennox Passage Swing Bridge in 1936

== Bridging the passage ==
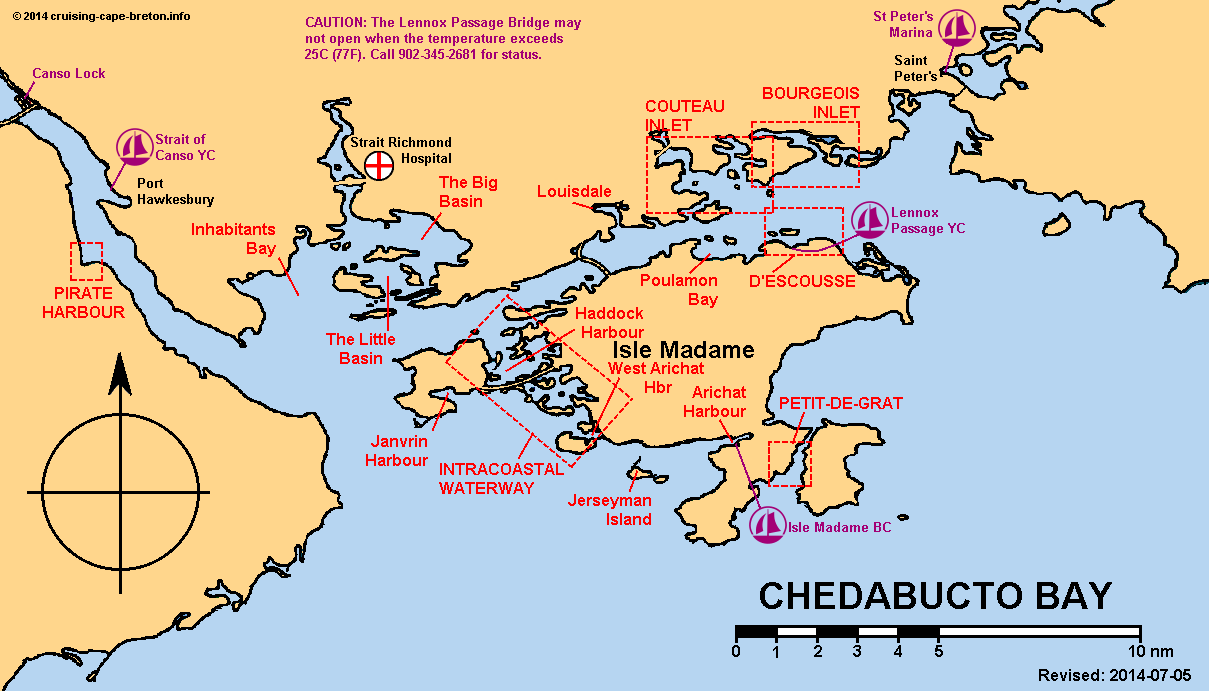
Chartlet of Chedabucto Bay, Lennox Passage, Lennox Passage Bridge and Isle Madame, Nova Scotia, Canada

Initially crossed by two ferries, (one from the present location of the bridge and one from Grandique Point to Grandique Ferry), construction of a swing bridge began in 1916 and was completed in 1919, connecting Isle Madame to Cape Breton. This bridge was horse-operated and according to Canadian yachtsman and author Silver Donald Cameron, a former resident of D'Escousse) in his book "Wind, whales and whisky" (page 14), was powered by Stanley Forgeron's rather temperamental horse in 1967 when Farley Mowat sailed through the passage aboard Happy Adventure on his way to Expo67.

In February 1970 following the grounding and subsequent breakup of the Liberian-registered tanker Arrow on Cerberus Rock in Chedabucto Bay and the resulting spill of 77,000 to 82,500 barrels (more than 2 million gallons) of bunker C oil, the decision was made by the Nova Scotia Government to construct two causeways between Burnt Point and Burnt Island to stop the spread of the Arrow's spilled cargo into the lucrative fishing areas of the Passage as well as the coastline to the east.

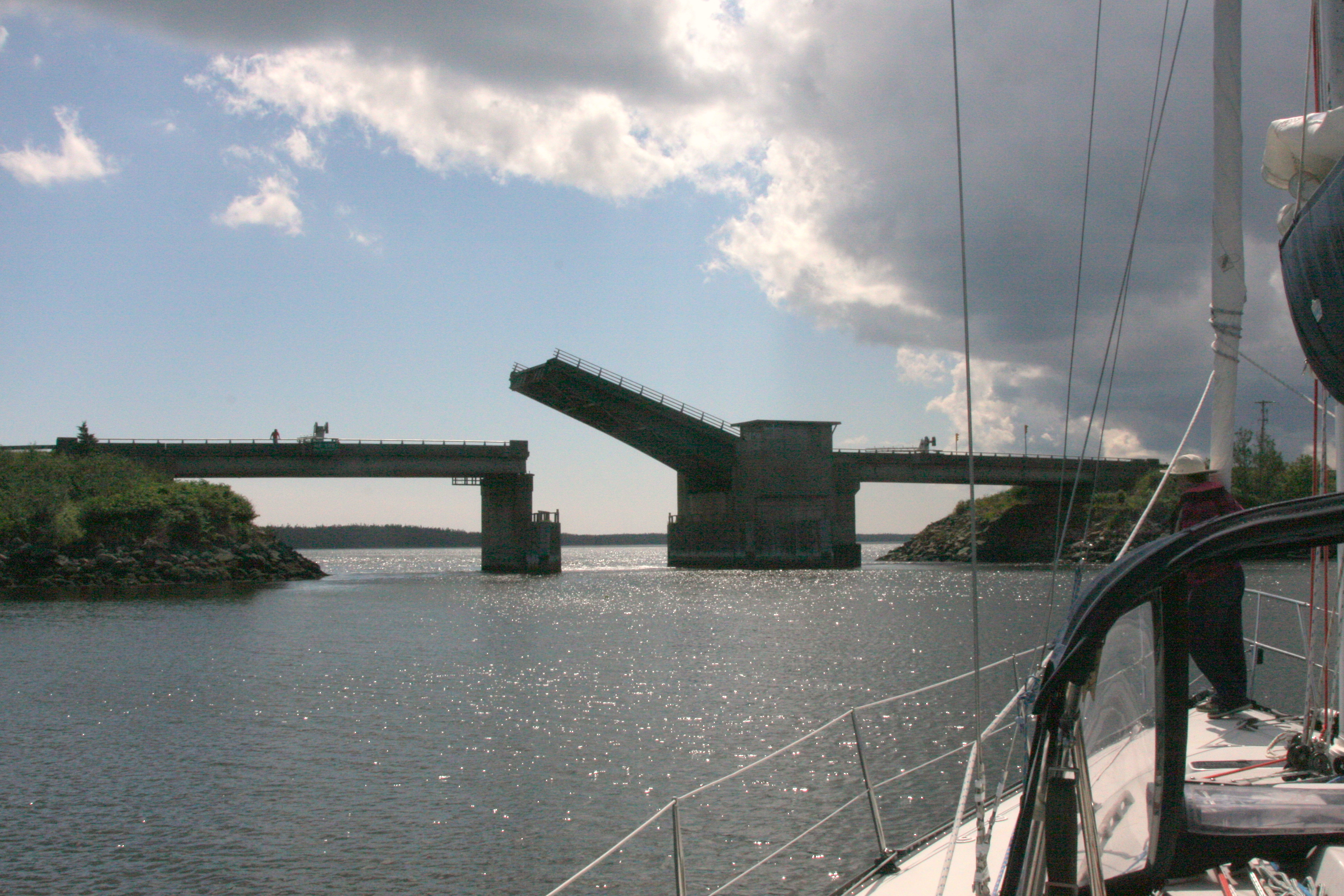
Lennox Passage Bridge (from the east) in 2011

After the oil spill cleanup by the mid-1970s, the Government left one causeway in place because the 1919 bridge had rusted beyond repair and in response to the needs of marine interests built the Lennox Passage Bridge, a four-span, 98.5 metres (323 ft) bascule bridge with two concrete spans, a counterweight span and an electrically powered single-leaf bascule bridge carrying Nova Scotia Route 320.

When closed, the bridge has a vertical clearance of 5.5 metres (18 ft) at high tide, possibly as much as 7.3 metres (24 ft) at a very low tide.

== Bridge inoperable ==
Beginning in 2010, marine interests were advised that the heat of the day in summer months may make it impossible for the bridge operator to lift the span, forcing vessels to either wait at anchor or make the voyage around the east coast of Isle Madame. The Nova Scotia Government advised the public that repairs to the structure were scheduled as an ongoing project beginning in 2015–2016.

By 2018 the repairs had still not been carried out and it was announced that the Lennox Bridge was inoperable and pleasure craft with an air draft of over 5.5 metres (18 ft) at high tide would not be able to pass through.

In the fall of 2018 a tender to repair the lift bridge at Lennox Passage was awarded at a cost of $4.54 million to Allsteel Coatings Ltd. of Port Hastings. The work had been scaled back slightly from the original vision after the only bid came back more expensive than anticipated.

In 2019 a Navigational Warning was issued by Fisheries and Oceans Canada advising the air draft under the Lennox Passage bridge was reduced to 10 feet (3.3 metres) at high tide until September 5, 2019.

In August 2019 in an interview, Lloyd Hall, district bridge engineer with Nova Scotia Transportation and Infrastructure Renewal, explained while it was originally hoped the work would conclude in time for the bridge to reopen for the 2019 boating season, the work now isn't expected to be finished until mid- to late-October 2019.

In September 2019, the Nova Scotia Department of Transportation and Infrastructure renewal announced that the bridge would be open for the 2020 boating season.
