= Pondville, Nova Scotia =

Community in Nova Scotia, Canada

Coordinates: 45°32′17.59″N 60°58′45.38″W

Pondville in Nova Scotia

Pondville is a small community in the Canadian province of Nova Scotia, located in Richmond County on Isle Madame. It has many beaches including Pondville Beach.
