= Marguerite Janvrin Adams =

American poet

- Born: Marguerite Lawall Janvrin; September 20, 1889; New York, New York, U.S.
- Died: May 14, 1957 (aged 67)
- Occupation: Poet

Marguerite Lawall Janvrin Adams (September 20, 1889 – May 14, 1957) was an American poet active from the 1920s into the 1950s.

== Biography ==
Adams was born in New York City, the daughter of Joseph Edward Janvrin and Laura Lawall Janvrin. Her father was a physician and a Union Army veteran of the American Civil War. She graduated from the Spence School.

Adams was a poet who published frequently in national periodicals including Opportunity, The Journal of American History, The Churchman, The Living Church, Prairie Schooner, Spirit, and American Poetry Magazine. "When she writes directly from the heart, Miss Adams is a sound lyric poet," noted reviewer Robert Resor in 1948. She was on the board of the Poetry Society of America. She was a member of the Authors League and the Pen and Brush Club.

Janvrin married physician Phineas Hillhouse Adams in 1914. They had three children. Her husband died in 1933, and she died in 1957, at the age of 67.

== Publications ==
All titles below are poems, unless otherwise specified.

- "Absence" (1926)
- "Song of Lost Days" and "Indian Summer" (1927)
- "Metropolitan Tower--New York", "The Wharves", "In Passing", and "Monticello" (1928)
- "Query" (1929)
- "Armour" (1930)
- "Inspiration of Spires--New York" (1931)
- I Give You Words (1934, poetry collection)
- "Brief Hour" (1936)
- "Conversation--In Youth" and "Conversation--In Age" (1937)
- "Tenantry" and "New Hampshire Winter" (1938)
- "Mediation" and "If I Must Live in Cities" (1941)
- "Tears" and "October" (1943)
- "Island of the Dead", "Dark Reaping", "Appointment in September", and "Certain Hour" (1944)
- "The Fight is Longer" (1945)
- "Two Portraits" (1946)
- "They Who Possess the Sea", "Nungesser and Coli", and "Fellowship" (1946)
- "Golden City" (1948)
- Insignia Amoris (1948, poetry collection)
- "Text for Spring" (1949)
- "American History" (1951)
- "So Said the Sleeper" (1957)
