= Atlantic Canada's 100 Greatest Books =

- Author: Trevor Adams; Stephen Patrick Clare
- Publication date: 2009
- ISBN: 978-1551097350

Atlantic Canada's 100 Greatest Books is a non-fiction book by Trevor J. Adams and Stephen Patrick Clare, published by Nimbus Publishing. The first book of its type, it ranks and reviews the top 100 books written by Atlantic Canadian writers, published in the region, or focusing on the region. The 100 books chosen were selected from a list of over 2,000 titles voted on by over 700 authors, editors and critics. The book includes reviews of each of the ranked titles, top-ten lists on a variety of literary subjects, and lists from guest contributors such as the premiers of the Maritime Provinces and novelists such as David Adams Richards and Ami MacKay.

The book lists Alistair MacLeod's No Great Mischief as the greatest Atlantic Canadian book of all time.

Anne of Green Gables by Lucy Maud Montgomery was second.

Four authors — Richards, Raymond Fraser, Wayne Johnston and Thomas Raddall — each had five books make the list.

Born and raised in Digby County, Nova Scotia, Trevor J. Adams lives in Halifax and is senior editor/copy chief with Advocate Media. Stephen Patrick Clare is a freelance writer and professional musician, originally from Montreal.
