= Janvrin Island =

Island in Nova Scotia, Canada

- Interactive map of Janvrin Island

Geography
- Location: near Cape Breton Island
- Coordinates: 45°32′N 61°09′W
- Major islands: Green Island, Jack's Island (Peninsula Point), Campbell Island

Administration
- Canada
- Province: Nova Scotia
- Largest settlement: Janvrin Harbour (pop. ~200)

Demographics
- Population: 250
- Ethnic groups: Acadians, Germans

Janvrin Island is a Canadian island off the coast of Cape Breton Island, Nova Scotia, in Richmond County. Janvrin Island, named for the family of John Janvrin, a merchant trader of Jersey, Channel Islands, is connected by a bridge to neighbouring Isle Madame. Janvrin Island was used by the Mi'kmaq Indians as a summer hunting ground and was especially prized for the white skinned deer who prospered there. For this reason, they called it "The Isle of the White Stag."

Janvrin Island is known to have some of the highest tides in the world, and evidence of the water erosion can be seen high up on the white cliffs on the island.
