= Patrick O'Flaherty (writer) =

Newfoundland and Labrador writer and historian

- Born: Patrick Augustine O'Flaherty; October 6, 1939; Long Beach, Newfoundland
- Died: August 16, 2017 (aged 77); Keels, Newfoundland and Labrador, Canada
- Spouse: Marjorie Doyle
- Children: 3

Academic background
- Education: Memorial University of Newfoundland (BA, MA); University College London (PhD)

Academic work
- Doctoral students: Elizabeth Russell Miller
- Main interests: Newfoundland history

Patrick Augustine O'Flaherty CM (October 6, 1939 – August 16, 2017) was a Newfoundland and Labrador writer, historian, and academic.

== Early life and education ==
O'Flaherty was born in Long Beach, part of Northern Bay, Conception Bay. He received a B.A. and M.A. from Memorial University of Newfoundland, and obtained his Ph.D. from University College London in 1963. After teaching at the University of Manitoba, in 1965 he joined the English department at Memorial, where he was later Professor and Head (1982–1987). He retired in 1995 and held the position of professor emeritus.

== Academic career ==
O'Flaherty was the author of two books of short stories, Summer of the Greater Yellowlegs (1987) and A Small Place in the Sun (1989), and two novels, Benny's Island (1994) and Priest of God (1989). In 1979, he published The Rock Observed, a survey of writing about Newfoundland and Labrador. He also wrote a travel guide Come Near at your Peril (first published 1992), a sardonic but affectionate look at tourism in Newfoundland.

In collaboration with historian Peter Neary, O'Flaherty wrote Part of the Main: An Illustrated History of Newfoundland and Labrador (1983) and edited By Great Waters (1977), an anthology of writing about Newfoundland and Labrador. O'Flaherty later completed three volumes on Newfoundland political history, Old Newfoundland: A History to 1843 (1999), Lost Country: The Rise and Fall of Newfoundland 1843-1933 (2005), and Leaving the Past Behind: Newfoundland History from 1934 (2011).

In 2007, O'Flaherty was inducted into the Order of Canada.

== Personal life and death ==
O'Flaherty was married to Marjorie Doyle, a writer and broadcaster, and had three sons from a previous marriage.

He drowned in a swimming accident in August 2017.
