= Petit-de-Grat, Nova Scotia =

Community in Nova Scotia, Canada

Coordinates: 45°30′21.55″N 60°57′26.27″W

Petit-de-Grat in Nova Scotia

Petit-de-Grat is a small Acadian community in the Canadian province of Nova Scotia, located in Richmond County on Petit-de-Grat Island. Its name comes from the Basque word "dégrat" which means "fishing station" or "whaling station".

== History ==
The community was first populated by French fishermen in 1718 after they arrived from Canso, Nova Scotia having survived a raid by New Englanders. The community was made up of 10 to 20 merchants who each owned a few shallops and employed about a dozen men. Petit de Grats was home to 173 people, including 8 women and 20 children. The community was a permanent, year-round village, whereas Canso hosted only seasonal fishing camps.

On August 8, 1720, a group of 60 Mi'kmaq joined the French from Petit de Grat and attacked Canso. In the battle, two New Englanders were shot to death and one drowned. The New Englanders took 21 prisoners which they transported to Annapolis Royal. This raid on Canso was significant because of the involvement of the Mi'kmaq and it precipitated a course of events that would lead to Dummer's War.

In 1745, the village was destroyed by New Englanders, led by Captain Jeremiah Moulton under the Command of Colonel William Pepperell, during the aftermath of the Siege of Port Toulouse.

During the American Revolution, on September 22, 1776, Canso, Nova Scotia was attacked by American privateer John Paul Jones - the Father of the American Navy. The privateer sailed on the USS Providence and destroyed fifteen vessels, and damaged much property on shore. There he recruited men to fill the vacancies created by manning his prizes, burned a British fishing schooner, sank a second, and captured a third besides a shallop which he used as a tender. Jones then pillaged Petit-de-Grat and Arichat, Nova Scotia on Isle Madame, Nova Scotia and then returned to Boston.

== Provincial Park Reserve ==
The Petit-de-Grat Provincial Park Reserve is located on the west side of Petit-de-Grat, near Boudreauville. It covers 646.20 hectares of land, and includes the Great Barachois, Mackerel Cove, Presqu'ile Cove. Its southern end is marked as a significant habitat for migratory birds.

== Library ==
The Petit-de-Grat Library is one of three in the Richmond County, and one of 10 in the Eastern Counties Regional Library network. The library in Petit de Grat, which provides library service and a large collection of both French and English materials, was officially opened on June 26, 1982. In December 1996, the branch relocated to the La Picasse Acadian educational and cultural centre. Circulation per month ranges from 774 (October 2016) to 3256 (May 2013).
