= Isle Madame (Nova Scotia) =

Small island in Nova Scotia, Canada

- Interactive map of Isle Madame

Geography
- Location: near Cape Breton Island
- Coordinates: 45°33′N 61°00′W
- Area: 45 km^{2} (17 sq mi)

Administration
- Canada
- Province: Nova Scotia
- Largest settlement: Arichat (pop. 2,000)

Demographics
- Population: 3,136 (2021)
- Pop. density: 24.2/km^{2} (62.7/sq mi)
- Languages: English, French
- Ethnic groups: Acadians

Isle Madame in Nova Scotia

Isle Madame is an island off southeastern Cape Breton Island in Nova Scotia. It is part of the Municipality of the County of Richmond.

Once part of the French colony of Île-Royale, it may have been named for Françoise d'Aubigné, marquise de Maintenon. After the fall of Louisbourg in 1758, 4,000 inhabitants were deported. However, a group of 10 Acadian families from Port Toulouse fled to this Isle Madame where their descendants still live today.

It is separated from Cape Breton Island by the Lennox Passage, but connected by a causeway. The island is also connected by bridge to Petit-de-Grat Island, and by causeway and bridge to Janvrin Island. Since 1994, the island has been served by a community television station, CIMC-TV, also known as Telile.

Isle Madame is home to 3,136 residents located mostly in the island's communities of Arichat, D'Escousse, and Petit de Grat.

== Demographics ==
According to the 2021 census, residents of Subdivision C of Richmond County, which comprises Isle Madame and its islets, had the following mother tongues:

65.4% reported English as a mother tongue, while 39.0% had French as a mother tongue.

The next most common mother tongue was German at 0.4%.

(Percentages sum to more than one hundred due to many residents claiming multiple mother tongues).

== Localities ==
- Pondville South
