= Mark Mulvoy =

American sports journalist and writer (born 1941)

- Born: August 16, 1941 (age 85); Boston, Massachusetts, U.S.
- Education: Boston College
- Occupations: Sports journalist; writer; managing editor
- Years active: 1963–1996
- Known for: Sports Illustrated; Boston Globe
- Awards: Elmer Ferguson Memorial Award (2023)

Mark Mulvoy (born August 16, 1941) is an American sports journalist and writer. He covered sports part-time for The Boston Globe while attending Boston College, then full-time after graduating. Initially hired by Sports Illustrated to cover baseball, he became a ghostwriter for Jack Nicklaus's golf column. Reporting on ice hockey beginning with the 1967 National Hockey League expansion, Mulvoy was the first American journalist to cover ice hockey in the Soviet Union including on the 1972 Summit Series. He also published multiple books on sports, including basketball, curling, football, golf, and ice hockey.

With Mulvoy as managing editor of Sports Illustrated from 1984 to 1995, the magazine received National Magazine Awards and profits more than quadrupled. He established Sports Illustrated Kids for a younger audience, began the Golf Plus insert to cater to an older audience, implemented commemorative issues for special events, and expanded the swimsuit issue and made it into an annual special edition. He held the dual role of publisher and managing editor from 1990 to 1992, and retired after coverage of the 1996 Summer Olympics. In 2023, he received the Elmer Ferguson Memorial Award for ice hockey journalism as chosen by the Professional Hockey Writers' Association.

== Early career in Boston ==
Mulvoy was born on August 16, 1941, in Boston, Massachusetts, (Note: Mulvoy's 13th birthday was August 16, 1954, indicating he was born on that date in 1941. Multiple sources list his hometown as Boston, or that he is a native of the Dorchester neighborhood of Boston.) to parents Thomas and Julie Mulvoy, in a family of three boys and one girl. Growing up in Dorchester, Mulvoy played hockey with his brothers, watched the Boston Bruins play at Boston Garden from the balcony seats, (Note: Mulvoy was a native of Dorchester and played ice hockey outdoors. Mulvoy and his brother played hockey by their apartment in Dorchester. Mulvoy sneaked into Boston Garden to watch from the nosebleed seats. A Boston Garden usher would let kids into the balcony to sit in the aisles.) and attended St. Mark's School and Boston College High School. As a youth, his first assignment as a caddie was for Rose Kennedy at the Wollaston Golf Club. (Note: First caddied for Rose Kennedy. As a youth, Mulvoy was a caddie at Wollaston Golf Club.)

Attending Boston College as a business major, Mulvoy wrote for the undergraduate newspaper, and aspired to cover the Boston Red Sox. Beginning in sports journalism part-time with The Boston Globe, he covered sports at Boston College until graduating in 1964, then working full-time for the Globe. (Note: Covering Boston College sports as a student at the school while writing part-time for The Boston Globe, he became full-time for the Globe when graduating in 1964. Mulvoy majored in business at Boston College while sportswriting for the Boston Globe. He wrote for Boston College undergraduate newspaper, and aspired to cover the Boston Red Sox. Mulvoy graduated from Boston College in 1964.) He occasionally wrote about the Bruins in lieu of Tom Fitzgerald, then was assigned to cover the Red Sox when the regular reporter was ill.

== Sports Illustrated ==
While on active duty with the Air National Guard of Massachusetts, Mulvoy was hired by Sports Illustrated in April 1965 to cover baseball, after a recommendation by Boston Globe colleague Leo Monahan. (Note: Mulvoy was on active duty with the Air National Guard when hired by Sports Illustrated. He was hired on April 1, 1965. He was recommended by Leo Monahan, and initially covered baseball. Mulvoy was hired to cover baseball.) His housewarming party after moving to the Upper East Side of Manhattan included players from the Red Sox and stewardesses from his building; that party resulted in a player from the Red Sox being fined for "failure to keep an appointment", and Red Sox general manager Mike Higgins reportedly grabbing Mulvoy's throat and growling, "What're you trying to do, kid, ruin my team?" Soon after, Mulvoy was assigned as a ghostwriter for Jack Nicklaus's golf column from 1965 until 1971.

Mulvoy became the Sports Illustrated ice hockey writer when the National Hockey League (NHL) expanded to twelve teams in 1967. He recalled, "When I joined the magazine, there was very little hockey in its pages". He was credited for giving the "roadrunner" nickname to Yvan Cournoyer, and wrote a detailed profile on Guy Lafleur one month before the Montreal Canadiens chose Lafleur first overall in the 1971 NHL amateur draft.

As the first American journalist to cover ice hockey in the Soviet Union, Mulvoy made three trips there between 1972 and 1975, reporting on the Soviet style of play which featured more passing than the North American style. He opined that "nobody realized the Russians were as good as they were". Calling the 1972 Summit Series "the single-greatest event I ever covered", Mulvoy felt "the Summit Series was magical in every way" because of "the emotion of it".

=== Managing editor ===
Mulvoy was promoted to senior editor of Sports Illustrated in 1977, was named an assistant managing editor in 1981, then became managing editor in 1984, the youngest person to hold the position in the magazine's history. (Note: Mulvoy was named senior editor in 1977. Mulvoy was named an assistant managing editor in 1981. In 1984, Mulvoy became the youngest managing editor in the magazine's history.) When selecting his first "sportsperson of the year" in 1984, Mulvoy felt that Heisman Trophy winner Doug Flutie deserved the recognition, but opted against honoring a fellow Boston College alumnus thinking it would look like favoritism. Mulvoy instead chose 1984 Summer Olympics gold medalists Edwin Moses and Mary Lou Retton.

Leading an editorial staff numbering more than 200, Mulvoy sought for Sports Illustrated " to be the conscience of sports". He managed investigative reports into cocaine use in the National Football League, and the Dowd Report which led to Pete Rose receiving a lifetime ban from baseball for gambling. As editor, Mulvoy decided which athlete's photo went on the cover of each issue. He established Sports Illustrated Kids for a younger audience, began the Golf Plus insert to cater to an older audience, implemented commemorative issues for special events, and expanded the swimsuit issue from 20 to 40 pages then made it into a special annual edition. (Note: Mulvoy established Sports Illustrated Kids, commemorative issues, and doubled the swimsuit issue to 40 pages. He established the Golf Plus insert for the older golfing audience. He expanded the swimsuit issue into a special annual issue. Mulvoy created Golf Plus and Sports Illustrated Kids, and made the swimsuit issue into an annual special edition.) The swimsuit issue sold five million copies annually during his time as managing editor, and profits for Sports Illustrated more than quadrupled. The American Society of Magazine Editors honored Sports Illustrated with National Magazine Awards in 1988 and 1989.

From 1990 to 1992, Mulvoy held the dual role of publisher and managing editor. When giving up the publisher's role, he committed to retiring by 1995. In January 1996, he was succeeded by Bill Colson who had been assistant managing editor since 1991. No longer overseeing the weekly magazine, Mulvoy focused on SI for Kids and SI Presents. His final project for Sports Illustrated was coverage of the 1996 Summer Olympics in Atlanta.

== Published books ==
- Sports Illustrated Ice Hockey (1971)
- Sports Illustrated Curling: Techniques and Strategy (1973), with Ernie Richardson
- Face-off at the Summit (1973), with Ken Dryden
- My Game (1974), with Bobby Orr
- Overtime!: An Uninhibited account of a Referee's Life in the NBA (1975), with Richie Powers
- Golf: The Passion and the Challenge (1977), with Art Spander
- Great Moments In Sports (1981)
- Sports Illustrated Golf (1983), with Heinz Kluetmeier
- Happy to be Alive (1983), with Darryl Stingley
- Golf: Play Like a Pro (1988)

== Honors and reputation ==
Mulvoy became a media member honoree at "The Tradition" in 2004, the third annual induction ceremony for The Sports Museum of New England based in Boston. He was chosen by the Professional Hockey Writers' Association (PHWA) to receive the Elmer Ferguson Memorial Award for his career in ice hockey journalism, which placed him into the media section of the Hockey Hall of Fame in 2023, and made him a lifetime member of the PHWA.

PHWA president Frank Seravalli felt that Mulvoy was "hockey's best friend at a time of critical period of growth for the sport", and that "even when interest in the sport was waning, he kept hockey at the forefront". Sports Illustrated writer Michael Farber described Mulvoy as "an angel on the shoulder of the National Hockey League—but he was also a thorn in its side", and that "he shepherded tough, tough stories". Early in Mulvoy's career with Sports Illustrated, editor Gary Valk opined that "one reason Mulvoy gets along so well with athletes is that in temperament and life style he closely resembles the people he writes about–he is tall, energetic and effusive, and well-dressed".

== Personal life ==
Mulvoy is married to Patricia, and has two daughters and two sons. His brother, Thomas F. Mulvoy Jr. was once managing editor of the Boston Globe. Mulvoy has residences in Rye, New York, and Vero Beach, Florida. In retirement, he planned to teach journalism, and compete in amateur golf. He has golfed with presidents of the United States, competed in the 1999 U.S. Senior Amateur Championship, and is a member of five golf clubs, including the John's Island Club in Vero Beach, the Pine Valley Golf Club in New Jersey, The Royal and Ancient Golf Club of St Andrews in Scotland, and Ballybunion Golf Club in Ireland.

First visiting Vero Beach to interview Pete Dye for a book in 1973, Mulvoy became a resident of the city. He had a golf handicap of 3.4 as of 2015, and became president of the Society of Seniors for amateur golfers in 2009. He led efforts for the Treasure Coast to host its first United States Golf Association national championship, the 2015 U.S. Mid-Amateur Championship hosted at John's Island Club. He previously obtained for the club hosting duties of a Florida Mid-Amateur championship, a Florida Open golf tournament, and multiple U.S. Open qualifying events.
