= Neil Stevens =

Canadian sportswriter (1947–2022)

- Stevens in 1994
- Born: June 14, 1947; St. Catharines, Ontario, Canada
- Died: April 1, 2022 (aged 74)
- Education: Ryerson Institute of Technology, Niagara College
- Occupations: News and sports journalist, sportsman
- Known for: Writer for 35 years with Canadian Press from 1974 until 2008
- Notable work: Sport reporter for Peterborough Examiner, journalist with Sudbury Star
- Honours: NLL Hall of Fame, 2008

Neil Stevens (June 14, 1947 – April 1, 2022) was a Canadian sportswriter who covered numerous sports, including ice hockey, indoor lacrosse, the Olympic Games, and figure skating. He received his first newspaper job in 1970, having previously played lacrosse, and in 1974 began working for the Canadian Press. Stevens has been honoured by the Hockey Hall of Fame, National Lacrosse League Hall of Fame, and St. Catharines Sports Hall of Fame.

== Early life and lacrosse career ==
Born on June 14, 1947, in St. Catharines, Ontario, Stevens was raised in Port Dalhousie, Ontario, and began playing lacrosse at the age of five. At 16, his midget team won the Ontario championship, though Stevens, a center, missed the deciding game of the finals due to injury. He then played three seasons for the St. Catharines Lakesides junior team, and was named an All-Star by the Ontario Lacrosse Association once. Stevens joined the professional St. Catharines Golden Hawks in 1969; National Hockey League (NHL) goaltender Doug Favell was one of his teammates.

== Writing career ==
Stevens attended Ryerson Institute of Technology briefly before backpacking through Europe. He ended up at Niagara College, leaving early after being hired as a sports reporter by the Peterborough Examiner in 1970. At the age of 23, Stevens ended his lacrosse career due to a lack of time caused by his job at the Examiner. Stevens travelled for the first time as a reporter in 1971, when he provided coverage of the Minto Cup junior lacrosse event in British Columbia. Following two years with the Examiner, he was fired for being critical of the sports editor to the managing editor. A few months later, he began working for the Sudbury Star, where he stayed for two years. In 1974, Stevens was hired by the Canadian Press, having gained its notice for writing about an inquiry.

Stevens spent his early years at the agency covering news, and in 1979 was moved to sportswriting. He covered ice hockey starting in the 1980s, providing coverage of the Stanley Cup Final for the first time in 1982. After reporting on the 1986 and 1989 championship series, he covered the event annually starting in 1991. By 2008, Stevens had written on 20 Finals series. That year, Professional Hockey Writers' Association president Kevin Allen said of Stevens that "he might have been the most widely read hockey writer in Canada for the past 30 years." Stevens also served as a beat reporter on the Toronto Maple Leafs. In addition to the NHL, Stevens reported on numerous international tournaments, including the World Cup of Hockey twice, the Canada Cup four times, and the Ice Hockey World Championships four times. He covered the 1999 IIHF Women's World Championship, the 2001 World Junior Ice Hockey Championships, and the Memorial Cup on multiple occasions.

In 1998, the National Lacrosse League added a Canadian team, the Ontario Raiders. At the time, the Canadian Press did not cover the sport. Stevens recommended to the agency's sports editor that the league be reported on, and he was made the first Canadian Press lacrosse writer. He covered the Raiders and their successors, the Toronto Rock. Stevens provided coverage of other sports as well; among them were the Olympic Games (which he covered eight times) and figure skating (22 world championships). On March 1, 2008, he retired from full-time work at the Canadian Press. However, he remained an active freelance writer and reporter for the Rock's games. Stevens served as a media contact for Canada's national men's lacrosse team during the 2010 World Lacrosse Championship in Manchester, England, and covered the 2011 FIL World Indoor Lacrosse Championship in Prague and the 2015 event in Syracuse, New York. He was a book author and maintained an interest in music.

== Later life and death ==
After retiring in 2008, Stevens spent time at his home in Brampton and a Lake Huron cottage. He died on April 1, 2022, aged 74, from cancer.

== Honours ==
Multiple sports halls of fame have given Stevens honours for his work. In 2008, the National Lacrosse League Hall of Fame recognized him. That same year, the Hockey Hall of Fame presented Stevens with the Elmer Ferguson Memorial Award, presented annually to a sportswriter chosen by the Professional Hockey Writers' Association. Canadian and American writers had given him a nomination before he was selected. In addition, the St. Catharines Sports Hall of Fame inducted Stevens, also in 2008. He joined two members of his family in that hall of fame; Stevens' uncle, Ken Croft, was also honoured in 2008, and his father, John, was a previous inductee.
