= Jacques Beauchamp =

Quebec sports journalist

- Born: February 4, 1927; Saint-Jérôme, Quebec, Canada
- Died: September 17, 1988 (aged 61); Montreal, Quebec, Canada
- Occupation: Sports journalist
- Employers: Montréal-Matin; Journal de Montréal
- Notable work: La Soirée du hockey
- Awards: Order of Canada (1986); Elmer Ferguson Memorial Award (1982)

Jacques Beauchamp OC (February 4, 1927 – September 17, 1988) was a Canadian sports journalist. During his 25-year tenure at the Montréal-Matin, he became the first reporter to follow the Montreal Canadiens on the road on a regular basis. His work in journalism was recognized by the Elmer Ferguson Memorial Award from the Hockey Hall of Fame in 1982, and he was made a member of the Order of Canada in 1986.

== Early life ==
Beauchamp was born on February 4, 1927, in Saint-Jérôme, Quebec. As a youth, he played Junior A ice hockey with the Montreal Concordias and served as a spare goaltender for the Montreal Royals.

== Career ==
Beauchamp began his journalism career at the age of 16 when he joined the Journal La Patrie. He shortly thereafter left the journal to join the Montréal-Matin. During his 25-year tenure at the paper, he wrote a daily column and report on the Montreal Canadiens. As a result, he also became the first reporter to follow the Canadiens on the road on a regular basis. In 1952, Beauchamp was selected amongst a group of Quebecois sports reporters to serve as hosts on Ici Radio-Canada Télé's La Soirée du hockey. Between the second and third periods, Beauchamp and Émile Genest hosted a section called Ligue du vieux stove. Beauchamp was also invited to participate as a commentator in the Ligue du Vieux Poêle moderated by Jean-Maurice Bailly.

Due to his frequent traveling with the team, he was chosen as the Canadiens spare goaltender in the event that Jacques Plante was injured during a road trip. Prior to his signing, he regularly worked out with the team and played in an amateur league with former professional athletes. When speaking of his decision to sign with the team, he said "I will bet all my money no team will get as many as 15 shots at me. These players are my friends. The checking and the defense would be truly magnificent". He continued his journalism work with the Montréal-Matin and was elected the interim president of the newly founded National Hockey League Press Association in 1962. A few years later, he was elected vice-president of the board of directors of the National Hockey League Writers' Association alongside president Tom Fitzgerald and director Ted Damata.

Beauchamp left the Montréal-Matin in 1969 with Jean-Pierre Sanche and Marcel Gaudette to join Le Journal de Montréal. He had a large impact on the journal and was considered the most widely read sports journalist in Quebec. During his tenure at the paper, readership increased from 48,000 copies daily to 100,000 in one year which publisher Pierre Péladeau attributed to Beauchamp saying, "if Jacques Beauchamp had not entered the Journal de Montréal, we would never have experienced such a boom. To a certain extent, we even owe the Journal's survival to him." His influence expanded beyond newspaper sales and influenced the hiring of Jacques Demers by the Chicago Cougars. Beauchamp had previously befriended Demers while he was coaching the Chateauguay Junior B team and he wrote favorably of the man upon the creation of the World Hockey Association in 1972. During his 19 years with the paper, in which he served as director of the sports section, Beauchamp searched the province of Quebec for younger reporters to join the journal.

Beauchamp eventually followed Péladeau in founding the Philadelphia Journal in 1977, a daily sports-heavy tabloid of which Beauchamp was the editor-in-chief. When speaking of the newspaper, he said "we're going to try to build our paper on happiness, on smiles". Beauchamp served as a vice-president of media conglomerate Quebecor Media, the parent company of the Philadelphia Journal.

=== Awards and honours ===
Beauchamp's journalism work was recognized by the Hockey Hall of Fame in 1982 with the Elmer Ferguson Memorial Award, given to media members who "distinguished themselves during their career". Beauchamp suffered from diabetes throughout his life and his activism was recognized by the Juvenile Diabetes International organization in 1982 with the Man of the Year award. In 1986, he became a Member of the Order of Canada for his "outstanding contribution to amateur and professional sports".

The Montreal Canadiens also recognized the journalist by creating the Jacques Beauchamp Molson Trophy in 1982. The trophy is awarded at the end of each season to "the member of the Canadiens who played a dominant role during the regular season, without obtaining any particular honor," as selected by the local media. They also established the Bell Centre Salon Jacques-Beauchamp media lounge.

== Personal life and death ==
Beauchamp and his wife Murielle had one daughter together, Suzanne, before his death on September 17, 1988. He died in Montreal, and was interred at Repos St-François d'Assise Cemetery in Montreal.
