= Elmer Ferguson Memorial Award =

Award for journalism in ice hockey

- Sport: Hockey
- Awarded for: "To recognize distinguished members of the newspaper profession whose words have brought honor to journalism and to hockey."
- Location: Hockey Hall of Fame
- Presented by: Professional Hockey Writers' Association

History
- First award: 1984
- Most recent: Al Morganti (2022)
- Website: Official website

The Elmer Ferguson Memorial Award is an accolade presented annually to a print newspaper columnist or reporter in recognition of their achievements covering the game of ice hockey. The award is "to recognize distinguished members of the newspaper profession whose words have brought honor to journalism and to hockey."

The Hockey Hall of Fame established the accolade in 1984 and named it after the Montreal-based Canadian newspaper sports journalist Elmer Ferguson. Early in the year, the recipient is chosen by a committee of members from the Professional Hockey Writers' Association. The winner receives the award from the Hockey Hall of Fame at a ceremony held at BCE Place, Toronto, Ontario, Canada. Each recipient receives a 12 by 12 feet (3.7 by 3.7 m) glass plaque that is put on display on two glass columns in the media section of the Hockey Hall of Fame. The ceremony associated with the accolade takes place separately to the induction of players into the Hockey Hall of Fame as—despite widespread confusion on the issue—media honorees are not considered full inductees. The Hockey Hall of Fame recognizes the recipients as "media honourees"—a separate distinction from those inducted as "honoured members".

During the 37 years the award has been active, there have been a total of 62 winners. The first 17 recipients—Jacques Beauchamp, Jim Burchard, Red Burnett, Dink Carroll, Jim Coleman, Ted Damata, Marcel Desjardins, Jack Dulmage, Milt Dunnell, Ferguson, Tom Fitzgerald, Trent Frayne, Al Laney, Joe Nichols, Basil O'Meara, Jim Vipond and Lewis Walter—were honored in 1984. At least two journalists were named winners each year until 1990. There was no winner in each of 1992, 1994, 1996 and 2021.

Helene Elliott, a writer for the Los Angeles Times, became the first female recipient in 2005. She was also the first woman to be honored in the media section of one of the Big Four team Sports Halls of Fame. The award has been presented posthumously on eight occasions, seven of the initial 23 honourees over the first two classes (1984, 1985), and Dave Fay in 2007 (award ceremony held four months after his death). Journalists who have worked for the Toronto Star have been recognised seven times, followed by The Globe and Mail reporters with six and Le Journal de Montréal on five occasions. Each of the 62 winners have been journalists from either Canada or the United States.

== Recipients ==
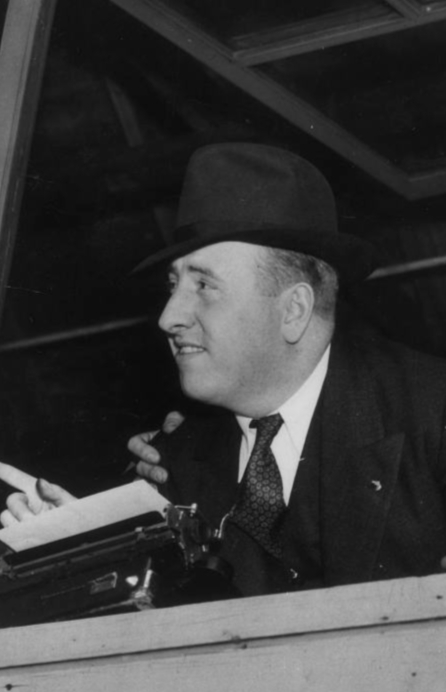
Red Burnett, the Toronto Star, reporter, was one of 17 inaugural winners in 1984

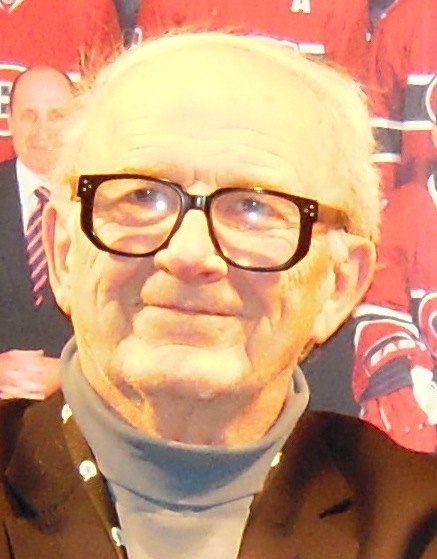
Red Fisher was one of six recipients when he was named an award recipient in 1985.

Key
†	Indicates posthumous award

Recipients of the Elmer Ferguson Memorial Award
Year	Recipient	Publication(s)	Ref
1984	Jacques Beauchamp	Montréal-Matin/Le Journal de Montréal	
1984	Jim Burchard	New York World-Telegram	
1984	Red Burnett†	Toronto Star	
1984	Dink Carroll	Montreal Gazette	
1984	Jim Coleman	Southam Newspapers	
1984	Ted Damata	Chicago Tribune	
1984	Marcel Desjardins	La Presse	
1984	Jack Dulmage	Windsor Star	
1984	Milt Dunnell	Toronto Star	
1984	Elmer Ferguson†	Montreal Herald/Montreal Star	
1984	Tom Fitzgerald†	The Boston Globe	
1984	Trent Frayne	Toronto Telegram/The Globe and Mail/Toronto Sun	
1984	Al Laney	New York Herald Tribune	
1984	Joe Nichols	The New York Times	
1984	Basil O'Meara†	Montreal Star	
1984	Jim Vipond	The Globe and Mail	
1984	Lewis Walter†	Detroit Times	
1985	Charlie Barton†	Buffalo Courier-Express	
1985	Red Fisher	Montreal Star/Montreal Gazette	
1985	George Gross	Toronto Telegram/Toronto Sun	
1985	Zotique Lespérance	Le Journal de Montréal/Le Petit Journal	
1985	Charles Mayer†	Le Petit Journal/La Patrie	
1985	Andy O'Brien	Weekend Magazine	
1986	Dick Johnston	The Buffalo News	
1986	Leo Monahan	Boston Daily Record/Record-American/Boston Herald American	
1986	Tim Moriarty	UPI/Newsday	
1987	Bill Brennan	The Detroit News	
1987	Rex MacLeod	The Globe and Mail/Toronto Star	
1987	Ben Olan	Associated Press	
1987	Francis Rosa	The Boston Globe	
1988	Jim Proudfoot	Toronto Star	
1988	Scott Young	The Globe and Mail/Toronto Telegram	
1989	Claude Larochelle	Le Soleil	
1989	Frank Orr	Toronto Star	
1990	Bertrand Raymond	Le Journal de Montréal	
1991	Hugh Delano	New York Post	
1993	Al Strachan	The Globe and Mail/Toronto Star	
1995	Jack Gatecliff	St. Catharines Standard	
1997	Ken McKenzie	The Hockey News	
1998	Yvon Pedneault	La Presse/Le Journal de Montréal	
1999	Russ Conway	The Eagle-Tribune	
2000	Jim Matheson	Edmonton Journal	
2001	Eric Duhatschek	Calgary Herald	
2002	Kevin Dupont	The Boston Globe	
2003	Michael Farber	Montreal Gazette/Sports Illustrated	
2004	Jim Kelley	The Buffalo News	
2005	Helene Elliott	Los Angeles Times	
2006	Scott Morrison	Toronto Sun/Sportsnet	
2007	Dave Fay†	The Washington Times	
2008	Neil Stevens	The Canadian Press	
2009	Dave Molinari	Pittsburgh Post-Gazette	
2010	Marc de Foy	Le Journal de Montréal/RueFrontenac.com	
2011	Terry Jones	Edmonton Sun	
2012	Roy MacGregor	The Globe and Mail/National Post/Ottawa Citizen/Toronto Star/Maclean's	
2013	Jay Greenberg	Philadelphia Daily News	
2014	Kevin Allen	USA Today	
2015	Bob McKenzie	TSN/The Hockey News	
2016	Bob Verdi	Chicago Tribune	
2017	Cam Cole	Edmonton Journal/National Post/Vancouver Sun	
2018	Larry Brooks	New York Post	
2019	Frank Brown	Associated Press/New York Daily News	
2020	Tony Gallagher	The Province	
2022	Al Morganti	Philadelphia Inquirer, NBC Sports	
2023	Mark Mulvoy	Sports Illustrated	
2024	Scott Burnside	Windsor Star, ESPN.com, The Athletic	
2025	François Gagnon	RDS, La Presse	
2026	Gunnar Nordström	Expressen	

== Statistics ==
Multiple award recipients by publication
Name	Awards
Toronto Star	7
The Globe and Mail	6
Le Journal de Montréal	5
Montreal Gazette	3
Montreal Star	3
The Boston Globe	3
Toronto Sun	3
Toronto Telegram	3
La Presse	3
Associated Press	2
Chicago Tribune	2
Edmonton Journal	2
National Post	2
New York Post	2
The Hockey News	2

== See also ==
- BBWAA Career Excellence Award
- Bill Nunn Memorial Award
- Curt Gowdy Media Award
