= Cam Cole =

Canadian sports journalist (born 1953)

- Born: 1953 (age 72–73); Vegreville, Alberta, Canada
- Occupation: Journalist
- Years active: 1975 – 2016
- Awards: Elmer Ferguson Memorial Award

Cam Cole (born 1953) is a Canadian sports journalist. During his career, Cole has worked for the Edmonton Journal, National Post, and Vancouver Sun. After retiring in 2016, Cole was awarded the Elmer Ferguson Memorial Award by the Hockey Hall of Fame and Golf Canada’s Distinguished Service Award.

== Early life and education ==
Cole was born in Vegreville, Alberta in 1953. He attended the University of Alberta (U of A) where he was a journalist for the student newspaper, The Gateway. However, Cole dropped out of U of A's science program and pursued a career in book-and-magazine distributorship before returning to the University as a general arts student.

== Career ==
In his second year back at U of A, Cole began working as a general sports journalist for the Edmonton Journal after their high school journalist was fired. During his time with the Edmonton Journal, he covered high school sports, soccer, the Alberta Junior Hockey League, and the National Hockey League's Edmonton Oilers. In 1998, after covering the Edmonton Oilers 1980s dynasty, Cole moved to Toronto to work for the National Post. While with the National Post, Cole was inducted into the Canadian Football Hall of Fame Reporters of Canada wing and awarded the Sports Media Canada Sportswriter of the Year award in 2004. The following year, Cole was hired by the Vancouver Sun while covering the 2005 Super Bowl for the Post.

In 2010, Cole was named a finalist for the 2010 Jack Webster Awards as "Best News Reporting of the Year" for his article "A Tragic Day in Whistler." While with the Sun in 2011, Cole became the first reporter to be awarded the Sports Media Canada George Gross Award as Sports Media Canada Sportswriter of the Year for the second time. Cole stayed with the Sun until his retirement in 2016. At the time of his retirement, Cole had reported on multiple general sports events such as the Olympic Games, Grey Cups, Stanley Cup finals, golf championships, Ryder Cups, Presidents Cups, Canadian Opens, World Series, Super Bowls, and world figure skating championships. In 2017, Cole was awarded the Elmer Ferguson Memorial Award by the Hockey Hall of Fame. At the announcement of his award, Scott Burnside, president of the Professional Hockey Writers' Association, said "...Cam is widely regarded as one of the greatest Canadian sports writers of all time. You'll get no argument from this quarter." In 2018, Cole was awarded Golf Canada’s Distinguished Service Award for his sports journalism career.

== Publications ==
The following is a list of Cole's publications:

- Ice level: Canadian hockey moments from the last 50 years: Canada's best from the best (2005)

== Personal life ==
Cole and his wife Jan have two daughters together, Kelly and Michelle.
