= Jay Greenberg (journalist) =

American sports journalist (1950–2021)

- Born: 1950 (Note: In 2013, Greenberg was reported to be 63); Johnstown, Pennsylvania, US
- Died: August 12, 2021 (aged 71); Englishtown, New Jersey, US
- Education: University of Missouri (BA)
- Occupation: Journalist
- Spouse: Mona (married)
- Children: 2
- Awards: Elmer Ferguson Memorial Award

Jay Greenberg (1950 – August 12, 2021) was an American sports journalist. During his career, he has worked for The Kansas City Star, Philadelphia Daily News, the Philadelphia Bulletin, Toronto Sun, and New York Post.

In 2013, Greenberg was awarded the Elmer Ferguson Memorial Award by the Hockey Hall of Fame.

== Early life and education ==
Greenberg was born and raised in Johnstown, Pennsylvania. He stated that growing up watching the Johnstown Jets made him a fan of hockey.

Greenberg attended Westmont Hilltop High School before attending the University of Missouri. After graduating from the University of Missouri, Greenberg began working at The Kansas City Star.

== Career ==
In his second year with the Star, Greenberg was assigned as a beat reporter on the Kansas City Scouts. He covered the Scouts during their inaugural season. However, his time at the Star was short-lived as in 1975 Greenberg was hired by the Philadelphia Bulletin as the Philadelphia Flyers beat reporter. He stayed with the Bulletin, and later the Philadelphia Daily News, for 14 years before joining Sports Illustrated in 1989. While with the Philadelphia Daily News, Greenberg covered "The Trade" which sent Wayne Gretzky to the Los Angeles Kings. After being unable to ask questions during the press conference, Greenberg was offered an exclusive interview with Gretzky personally. Of the incident, Greenberg stated, "I got stuff that next day that no one else got ... Wayne was the most aware superstar. He knew how frustrating it was that no one had any time with him. I'll never forget that." After one more job at the Toronto Sun for two years, Greenberg wrote a general sports column for the New York Post for the next 17 years.

In 1996, Greenberg wrote a book titled "Full Spectrum: The Complete History of the Philadelphia Flyers Hockey Club" for the Flyers' 30th Anniversary season. He was later hired by Mark Howe to write an autobiography titled "Gordie Howe's Son". In 2013, Greenberg was named a lifetime member of the Professional Hockey Writers' Association and was awarded the Elmer Ferguson Memorial Award by the Hockey Hall of Fame. Greenberg then began writing for hockeybuzz.com and princetontigersfootball.com.

== Personal life ==
Greenberg and his wife, Mona, were married for 44 years and were the parents of two daughters, Stephanie and Elizabeth. He died at his home in Englishtown, New Jersey, on August 12, 2021, from complications of West Nile virus.

== Publications ==
The following is a list of publications:

- Philadelphia Flyers at 50: the story of the iconic hockey club and its top 50 heroes, wins & events (2016)
- Gordie Howe's Son (2014)
- Full Spectrum: the Complete History of The Philadelphia Flyers Hockey Club (1996)
- NHL, the world of professional hockey (1981)
