= François Gagnon (journalist) =

Canadian sports journalist (born 1963)

- Born: 26 February 1963 (age 63); Quebec City, Quebec, Canada
- Education: Algonquin College
- Occupation: Sports journalist
- Years active: 1986–2026
- Employer: Réseau des sports
- Known for: Montreal Canadiens coverage
- Awards: Elmer Ferguson Memorial Award (2025)

François Gagnon (born 26 February 1963) is a Canadian former sports journalist who covered the Montreal Canadiens for more than 30 years. Exclusively with Réseau des sports from 2013 to 2026, Gagnon wrote regular columns on the Canadiens while appearing as a commentator during televised hockey broadcasts. He previously covered the Canadiens writing for Le Soleil and La Presse, and covered the Ottawa Senators for Le Droit. The Professional Hockey Writers' Association recognized his career with the Elmer Ferguson Memorial Award in 2025, and credited him for a willingness to share opinions and write controversial articles, and for being the voice of hockey for the French language in Canada.

== Early life and education ==
François Gagnon was born in Quebec City on 26 February 1963. Growing up in Quebec City, he regularly watched the Canadian French broadcast of Hockey Night in Canada and read books about ice hockey. He later worked in landscaping and for a moving van company, then studied at Cégep de Sainte-Foy and Algonquin College in Ottawa.

== Journalism career ==
Gagnon began in journalism in 1986, at CKCH radio in Hull, Quebec, where he covered news and court cases. An early mentor, Régis Bouchard, taught him the importance of checking facts to improve writing and quality. While Gagnon reported on a vehicle driven off the des Draveurs Bridge crossing of the Gatineau River during icy conditions in January 1988, a second vehicle also went off the same bridge. He and a nearby resident with a rope went into the icy river and rescued the driver, Monique Boudrias, the sister of Montreal Canadiens assistant general manager André Boudrias. Boudrias thanked Gagnon for saving his sister's life and offered him tickets for a Canadiens home game.

Writing for Le Droit, Gagnon covered the Hull Olympiques in the Quebec Major Junior Hockey League beginning in the 1994–95 season. One year later, he became the French language beat reporter for the Ottawa Senators and the National Hockey League. As the Montreal-based correspondent for the Quebec City newspaper Le Soleil, Gagnon wrote an article in September 2001 detailing the cancer diagnosis of the Canadiens' team captain Saku Koivu. Gagnon subsequently covered the Canadiens for La Presse from 2006 to 2013.

Gagnon worked for both La Presse and Réseau des sports (RDS) from 2008 until 2013. He wrote online columns about the Canadiens with RDS, and was a television panellist on L'Antichambre during hockey broadcasts. In 2009, he began contributing to Hockey 360. Working full-time with RDS since 2013, he continued as an online columnist and television commentator. He also made regular appearances with Marie-France Bazzo's morning show on Ici Radio-Canada Première. Gagnon stated his career highlight was a 45-minute interview with Jean Béliveau who was fighting cancer. Gagnon retired from RDS in 2026.

=== Reputation and honours ===
Canadiens' captain Guy Carbonneau stated that Gagnon's "enthusiasm and effort for the game he loves is evident every day", and that "everyone in hockey knows him, especially in Quebec". Gagnon's colleagues knew him to work hard, often deleting an entire article to start over and leave the press box around 2 a.m. Professional Hockey Writers' Association (PHWA) president Frank Seravalli credited Gagnon being the voice of hockey for more than 30 years in French Canada, and that he "is the first person that Montrealers read or listen to in the morning, because he does not hesitate to share his opinions or write controversial articles". Luc Gélinas opined that Gagnon "wants to understand and analyze everything, that's why many Canadiens fans believe that he hates this team".

Gagnon received the Elmer Ferguson Memorial Award in November 2025, for "excellence in hockey journalism" as chosen by the PHWA. In response, Gagnon felt his career became possible because of his passion for hockey. He felt that "most people who know me have never been able to read a word of what I wrote because of the language barrier", and that he asked questions to gain knowledge and insisted on getting answers. The Canadiens honoured Gagnon with a signed and framed #25 team jersey, and added his portrait to their wall of fame including all of the Elmer Ferguson Award winners who covered the team.

== Personal life ==
Gagnon is married to Marie-Claude Pilon, and has two sons and a daughter. He is an avid golfer, and frequent consumer of Coca-Cola and vintage wines. He has a recurring hemifacial spasm on his left side.
