= Jim Proudfoot (journalist) =

Canadian sports journalist (1933–2001)

- Born: 1933; Kearney, Ontario, Canada
- Died: April 1, 2001 (aged 67)
- Education: University of Toronto
- Occupation: Sports journalist
- Years active: 1952–2000
- Employer: Toronto Star
- Awards: Canadian Football Hall of Fame, Canadian Horse Racing Hall of Fame, Elmer Ferguson Memorial Award, Skate Canada Hall of Fame

James Alan Proudfoot (1933 – April 1, 2001) was a Canadian sports journalist. He spent his entire 49-year career with the Toronto Star, and served as the newspaper's sports editor. His columns regularly covered ice hockey, horse racing, figure skating and Canadian football. He was inducted into the Canadian Football Hall of Fame, the Canadian Horse Racing Hall of Fame and the Skate Canada Hall of Fame, and received the Elmer Ferguson Memorial Award from the Hockey Hall of Fame.

== Early life ==
James Alan Proudfoot was born in 1933, in Kearney, Ontario. His early education was in a two-room schoolhouse in Kearney, with his father James as the teacher.

== Journalism career ==
Proudfoot began his journalism career with the Toronto Star while a student at the University of Toronto in 1952. He went on to work 49 years for the newspaper, and succeeded Milt Dunnell as its sports editor. Proudfoot was known to his colleagues by the nickname "Chester".

According to Dunnell, Proudfoot was a lifetime hitchhiker, and would get rides from others to and from sporting events. Dunnell reported that Proudfoot never had a car, probably never had a driver's license, and used the Toronto Transit Commission regularly. To attend horse races at the Fort Erie Race Track, Proudfoot flew from the Toronto Island Airport to the Fort Erie Airport adjacent to the track.

Proudfoot wrote regularly about Canadian football and the Toronto Argonauts. He annually reported on the Stanley Cup, the Grey Cup, the Super Bowl, the World Series, and the World Figure Skating Championships. He was present at the 1967 Stanley Cup Finals won by the Toronto Maple Leafs, and covered boxing matches by George Chuvalo versus Muhammad Ali, George Foreman and Joe Frazier. Proudfoot recalled his experience at the 1972 Summit Series in an interview in May 1998, and stated that "the Paul Henderson goal is the greatest single event in the history of Canadian sports".

Proudfoot had a lifelong love for horse racing, and reported on the Kentucky Derby and the Queen's Plate. He regularly published columns on events at tracks in Canada, including the Fort Erie Race Track, Woodbine Racetrack, Greenwood Raceway and Mohawk Racetrack. He was the namesake of "Proudfoot", a horse trained by John Hayes which earned almost C$100,000 in prize money in Canada. Proudfoot was recognized for reporting on harness racing in 1966 and 1967, with the John Hersey Award from Ohio State University. He was also given the Sovereign Award in 1976, from the Jockey Club of Canada for his story on the disqualification of a 3-to-5 favourite horse to win a race. Proudfoot wrote an investigative report into the death of jockey Dan Beckon in 1988, and received the National Newspaper Award. Proudfoot raised doubt into the ruling of a suicide, after the jockey had failed a third drug test and faced a suspension from racing.

Proudfoot reported regularly on figure skating in his daily column from 1971 onwards, including local and international competitions. He began reporting on World Figure Skating Championships in the 1960s, and wrote about figure skating at six Winter Olympic Games.

Proudfoot remained active as a columnist until a stroke in May 2000.

== Personal life ==
Proudfoot died at age 67 on April 1, 2001, due to natural causes. He was survived by his brother Dan Proudfoot, who was a sports journalist for the Toronto Sun and The Globe and Mail. Proudfoot was interred beside his father in Fenaghvale Cemetery, in Fenaghvale, Ontario.

== Legacy and honours ==
Fellow journalist Josh Rubin described Proudfoot as a "grumpy" and "snarky" person, and a misanthropist. He reportedly "would bark at editors handling his stories", and "eventually make you feel like crawling under your chair", according to Rubin. He also used his surly persona to solicit charitable donations at Christmas. He was the namesake for the Proudfoot Corner of the Toronto Star Santa Claus Fund, which helped needy children during the holiday season.

Proudfoot received the Skate Canada Award of Merit in 1974, and the National Newspaper Award in 1988. He received the Elmer Ferguson Memorial Award from the Hockey Hall of Fame in 1988, in recognition of his hockey journalism as selected by the Professional Hockey Writers' Association. He was inducted as a reporter into the Canadian Football Hall of Fame in 1992, and received the lifetime achievement award from Sports Media Canada in 1998. He was posthumously inducted into the Canadian Horse Racing Hall of Fame in 2003, and the Skate Canada Hall of Fame in 2008.
