= Charles Mayer (journalist) =

Canadian journalist, sportsperson and politician (1901–1971)

- Born: 28 January 1901; Montreal, Quebec, Canada
- Died: 12 November 1971 (aged 70); Paris, France
- Education: Université de Montréal
- Occupations: Journalist, sports commentator, press secretary, politician
- Known for: La Patrie, Le Petit Journal, National Boxing Association
- Notable work: La Soirée du hockey
- Awards: Canada's Sports Hall of Fame; Elmer Ferguson Memorial Award

Charles Mayer (28 January 1901 – 12 November 1971) was a Canadian journalist, sportsperson and politician. He made a name in journalism as a sportswriter and municipal reporter with the newspaper La Patrie, and the magazine Le Petit Journal. He was the French-language publicist for the National Hockey League, and a radio sports commentator for the Montreal Royals and the Montreal Canadiens. He later became a press secretary for horse racing in Montreal, then was president of the Canadian Boxing Federation and vice-president of the National Boxing Association. He served six years on the Montreal City Council and campaigned for the city to host a Major League Baseball team and the Summer Olympic Games. He was one of the inaugural appointees to the National Fitness Council of Canada, was inducted into Canada's Sports Hall of Fame in 1971, and was posthumously recognized with the Elmer Ferguson Memorial Award in 1985 for his career as a hockey journalist.

== Early career ==
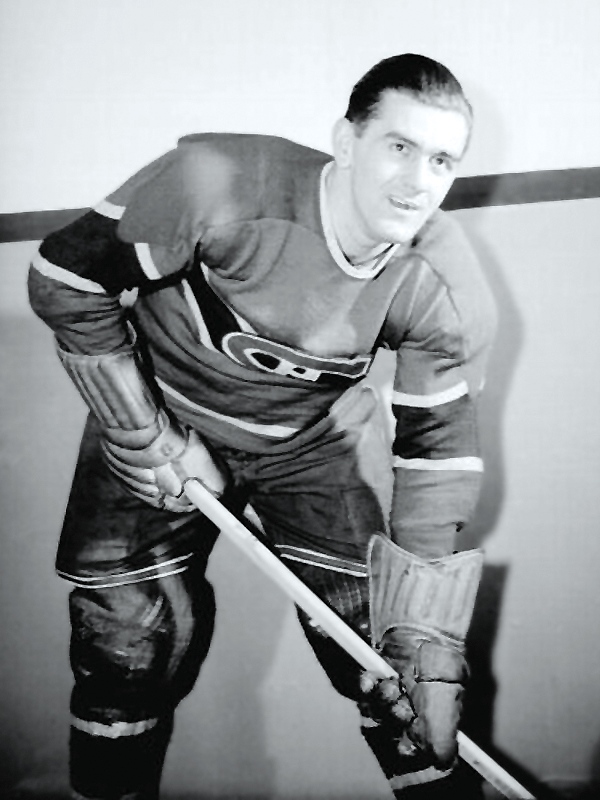
Maurice Richard

Charles Mayer was born on 28 January 1901, in Montreal, Quebec. He graduated from Université de Montréal in 1922 and went into journalism briefly with Le Canada, then was a sportswriter and municipal reporter for La Patrie from 1922 to 1933. He then covered sports while writing for the magazine Le Petit Journal beginning in 1933, and was named its executive sports editor in 1952. He also reported on municipal politics in Montreal.

Mayer began French-language broadcasts of the Montreal Royals baseball games in 1945, and was the sports commentator for World Series broadcasts in French on radio and television from 1944 to 1966. He was part of the Canadian delegation to the 1948 Summer Olympics hosted in London, and broadcast 15-minute event summaries daily.

Mayer was the French-language publicist for the National Hockey League, and oversaw the minor NHL game officials for more than 20 seasons in Montreal. He established and hosted the French-language equivalent of the Hot Stove League on radio broadcasts for the Montreal Canadiens. He was the regular selector for the three stars, and chose team captain Maurice Richard as the first, second, and third star of a playoffs game in which he scored five goals against the Toronto Maple Leafs on 23 March 1944.

In 1949, Mayer published a book on the history of the Montreal Canadiens entitled L'Épopee des Canadiens, which sold more than 100,000 copies.

== 1950s and 1960s ==
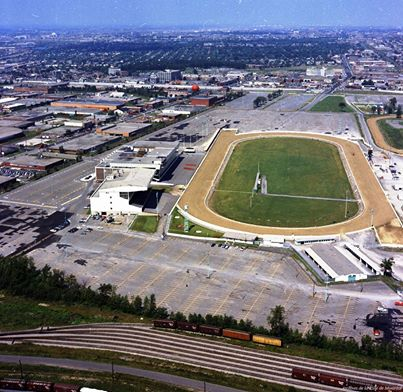
Blue Bonnets Raceway

Mayer served as the press secretary for horse racing at the Richelieu and Blue Bonnets raceways in Montreal during the 1950s. During the 1960s, he became the statistician at Blue Bonnets, and a horse show steward after he completed courses at the Jockey Club in the United States.

La Soirée du hockey made its television debut on 11 October 1952, and Mayer was one of the guest panelists for the Hot Stove League, along with Émile Genest and Jacques Beauchamp. He covered the 1954 British Empire and Commonwealth Games in Vancouver and broadcast daily reports in French.

Mayer was elected to two terms on Montreal City Council and served from 1954 until 1960. He openly campaigned for Montreal to bid for a Major League Baseball franchise, and hosting duties of the Summer Olympic Games. He was the owner and publisher of the Sunday newspaper, Samedi-Dimanche, from 1957 to 1959, and later worked as a freelance sports columnist which included a return to La Patrie.

While on the city council, Mayer was vice-president of the Montreal Athletic Commission which oversaw the sport of boxing in Quebec. He was president of the Canadian Boxing Federation from 1955 to 1956, later served as vice-president of the National Boxing Association, and was a boxing judge at the Olympics and other events. After losing his seat on city council and the Montreal Athletic Commission, he proposed a change in election procedures in his attempt to be eligible for the presidency of the National Boxing Association.

Mayer was one of the first group of 29 people named to the National Fitness Council in January 1962, with the task of advising the Government of Canada on implementation of a new fitness and amateur sport program. In February 1962, the council endorsed a plan for a Canadian sports festival to be held every four years, which eventually became the Canada Games. Mayer felt the concept could be used to select the Canada men's national ice hockey team in advance of the Winter Olympics. Mayer served on the council until 1964.

== Later life and honours ==
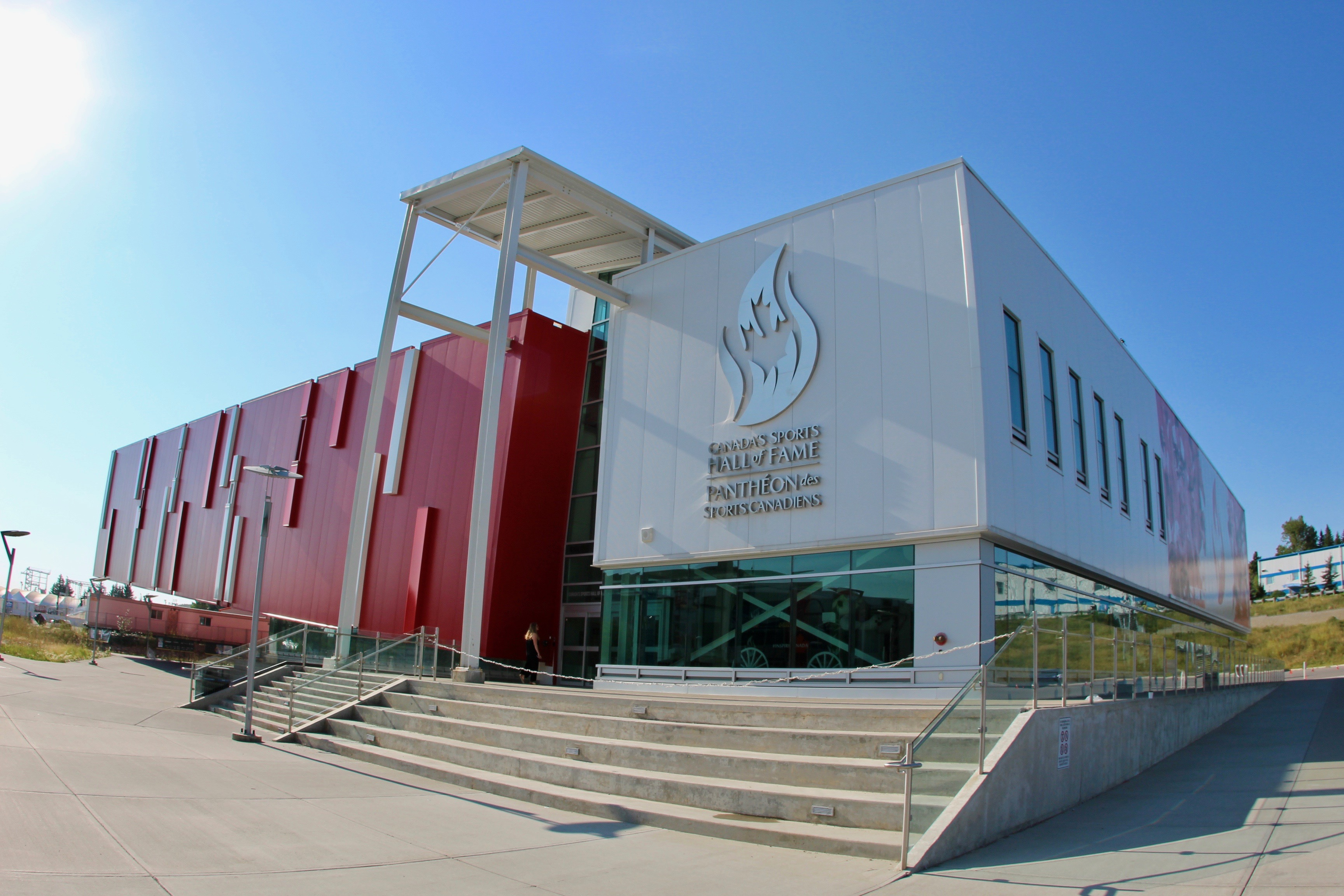
Canada's Sport Hall of Fame building in Calgary

Mayer served as vice-president of the francophone sports club Palestre Nationale. He was made one of the club's lifetime governors and represented the province of Quebec on the selection committee for Canada's Sports Hall of Fame. He was part of the Canadian delegation to the International Olympic Committee meeting in 1970, when hosting duties for the 1976 Summer Olympics were awarded to Montreal.

The Professional Hockey Writers' Association made Mayer an honorary member in February 1971, and he was inducted into the builder category of Canada's Sports Hall of Fame in May 1971.

Mayer died on 12 November 1971 in Paris, France, shortly after arriving on a flight to begin a vacation. He had been married to Marie Reine Lambert and fathered one son. Mayer was interred at Notre Dame des Neiges Cemetery in Montreal.

Mayer was posthumously recognized with the Elmer Ferguson Memorial Award in 1985, for his hockey journalism career as chosen by the Professional Hockey Writers' Association. Named in his honour are Parc Charles-Mayer in Montreal, and Rue Charles-Mayer in Saint-Charles-Borromée, Quebec.
