= Scott Burnside =

Canadian sportswriter (born 1963)

- Born: 1963 (age 62–63); Milton, Ontario, Canada
- Education: Carleton University; University of Ottawa
- Occupations: Journalist and sportswriter
- Years active: 1986 to present
- Known for: Windsor Star; Toronto Sun; National Post; Ottawa Citizen; ESPN; Professional Hockey Writers' Association; The Athletic
- Awards: Elmer Ferguson Memorial Award (2024); National Newspaper Awards (1990)

Scott Burnside (born 1963) is a Canadian sportswriter. Burnside began a career in sportswriting with the Windsor Star where he covered the Stanley Cup championships by the Detroit Red Wings in 1997 and 1998. He was the National Post sports columnist when the paper began publication in 1998, then covered the Toronto Maple Leafs for the Ottawa Citizen, and was a special correspondent for USA Today on the Atlanta Thrashers.

Covering the National Hockey League (NHL) for ESPN for 13 years, Burnside's stories explained why something happened and gave a behind-the-scenes perspective. He was president of the Professional Hockey Writers' Association from 2013 to 2017, and subsequently wrote for The Athletic, Daily Faceoff, and cohosted an ice hockey podcast with Pierre LeBrun. Burnside has also wrote web site articles for multiple teams and the NHL Players' Association. He received the 2024 Elmer Ferguson Memorial Award at the Hockey Hall of Fame, in recognition of a career in ice hockey journalism.

A graduate of journalism at Carleton University, Burnside was a columnist and spot news reporter for the Windsor Star and Toronto Sun before his sportswriting career. With the Windsor Star, he won multiple Western Ontario Newspaper Awards, and the special project category at the National Newspaper Awards. After three years covering the criminal trials of Paul Bernardo and Karla Homolka for the Toronto Sun, he cowrote the book Deadly Innocence published in 1995, and won two Edward Dunlop Awards and a Jamie Westcott Award for crime writing.

== Early life and education ==
Burnside was born in Milton, Ontario, in 1963. (Note: Burnside is a native of Milton, Ontario. His birthdate range can be deduced as April 25 to August 22, 1963, based on the following: Age 33 as of February 15, 1997. (February 15, 1963 to February 14, 1964); Age 28 as of February 18, 1992. (February 18, 1963 to February 17, 1964); Age 27 as of March 16, 1991. (March 16, 1963 to March 15, 1964); Age 26 as of April 14, 1990. (April 14, 1963 to April 13, 1964); Age 28 as of April 25, 1992. (April 25, 1963 to April 24, 1964); Age 20 as of August 23, 1983. (August 23, 1962 to August 22, 1963); Age 61 as of November 15, 2024. (November 15, 1962 to November 14, 1963)) He played minor ice hockey in the Essex-Kent Juvenile Hockey League, and was twice invited to training camps for the Essex 73's, while attending Essex District High School from grades 11 to 13. He subsequently earned bachelor of arts degrees in journalism at Carleton University, and in education at University of Ottawa. (Note: Burnside was a journalism major at Carleton University. He attended Carleton University and University of Ottawa, earning bachelor degrees in journalism and education. Burnside was a graduate of Carleton University journalism school, and has a bachelor of arts in education. Burnside has a bachelor degree in education from the University of Ottawa.) While at Carleton, he contributed two years of research and was the lead writer of a book on the history of Maidstone Township. Not knowing what he wanted to do in the future, Burnside joked that he might work for the National Enquirer. He began in journalism as a freelancer for the Ottawa Sun, reporting on hockey and the Hull Olympiques.

== News and crime reporter ==
Writing for the Windsor Star from 1986 to 1992, Burnside was a columnist and spot news reporter, often covering events at Windsor City Hall. In 1989, he won the Western Ontario Newspaper Award for spot reporting, covering a shooting death by the Tactics and Rescue Unit of the Ontario Provincial Police. In 1990, his five-day series on shift work cowritten with Grace Macaluso and Ellen van Wageningen, won the family section feature at the Western Ontario Newspaper Awards, and won the special project category at the National Newspaper Awards. The series focused on problems facing shift workers, and revealed that nearly half of the workers in Windsor and Essex County worked outside of normal business hours.

Teaching English in Prague while on leave of absence in 1991, Burnside wrote about language barriers for him and tourists in Pečky, and the local success of British rock band Ten Years After. Writing investigative articles about Czechoslovakia, he detailed the transition into a market economy as the government sold off small businesses to fund the State Bank of Czechoslovakia, and reported on environmental issues in Czechoslovakia, and the economics behind water treatment and land restoration.

In 1992, Burnside received a Southam News President's Award for cowriting the education series, "Our Failing Schools".

Moving to the Toronto Sun in 1992, Burnside and Al Cairns covered a series of violent crimes across Southern Ontario, including rapes, the death of Tammy Homolka and the murders of Leslie Mahaffy and Kristen French. Burnside and Cairns spent three years covering the criminal trials of Paul Bernardo and Karla Homolka for the "schoolgirl murders", then cowrote the book Deadly Innocence. The book published in September 1995 by Warner Books, was based on facts from the trial and outside sources. The book contained few details of the assaults, but concentrated on what not heard at the trial, based on interviews of friends of Bernardo and Homolka. Burnside won two Edward Dunlop Awards and a Jamie Westcott Award for his crime writing with the Toronto Sun. (Note: Sun Media presented the Edward Dunlop Award recognizing editorial achievements, named for a founding father of the Toronto Sun, Edward Arunah Dunlop Jr. who was president of the newspaper upon his death in 1981. Jamie Westcott was a Toronto Sun police beat reporter for three years, until his death at age 25 in 1989. The Jamie Westcott Memorial Award was established shortly after his death, for the best Toronto Sun beat report.)

== Sports journalism career ==
Burnside became the Windsor Star sports columnist in 1997, when the newspaper expanded sports coverage and shifted to a morning publication. He stated in a 2024 interview, that he "was really looking for something different after the Bernardo trial", but had never planned on covering sports. He reported on sports in Windsor and Essex County, and in Detroit, and covered his first National Hockey League (NHL) playoffs in 1997. His tenure coincided with consecutive Stanley Cup championships by the Detroit Red Wings in 1997 and 1998.

Transitioning to a national newspaper, Burnside wrote about sports for the National Post which began publication in October 1998. In September 2001, he was one of 130 layoffs from the National Post due to budget cuts and lack of profits.

Writing for the Ottawa Citizen from 2001 to 2003, Burnside regularly covered the Toronto Maple Leafs and the NHL, and wrote the regular "Inside the Leafs" column. (Note: Burnside covered the NHL for the Ottawa Citizen. Burnside covered the Toronto Maple Leafs regularly for the Ottawa Citizen. Burnside wrote the regular column, "Inside the Leafs", for the Ottawa Citizen.) His columns on the Maple Leafs appeared in other Southam News publications, and for CanWest News Service. He also covered the NHL, the Atlanta Thrashers, and Maple Leafs as a special correspondent for USA Today. He was also a cast member of Leafs TV during the 2002–03 season.

Burnside returned to writing for the National Post from June 2003 until October 2004. (Note: Burnside covered the Toronto Maple Leafs for the National Post in June 2003. Burnside covered sports for the National Post in October 2004.) During this time, he also covered the Atlanta Thrashers for CanWest and USA Today, and the Toronto Maple Leafs for The Canadian Press. (Note: Burnside covered the Atlanta Thrashers for CanWest News Service. Burnside covered the Atlanta Thrashers as a special correspondent for USA Today. Burnside covered the Toronto Maple Leafs in the Canadian Press.)

=== ESPN and the Professional Hockey Writers' Association ===
Burnside was covering the NHL for ESPN beginning in October 2004, remaining there for 13 years. His stories explained why something happened, giving fans a behind-the-scenes perspective. He interviewed Sidney Crosby in 2009, discussing the loss by the Pittsburgh Penguins in the 2008 Stanley Cup Finals, Crosby's subsequent recovery from concussions, then the victory in the 2009 Stanley Cup Finals followed by a details of the parade given to Crosby when taking the Stanley Cup home for a day. In 2015, Burnside accompanied Alexander Ovechkin on charity promotions, writing about a night of bowling, and an appearance at Andrews Air Force Base where Ovechkin was attacked by a military dog and used a bomb disposal robot.

According to Burnside, his favourite story with ESPN was reporting on the selection process of the United States national team for ice hockey at the 2014 Winter Olympics. He and Kevin Allen of USA Today were the only two journalists given access to the meetings. USA Hockey hoped that the resulting story would popularize the game in the USA, despite the criticism written about the process by Burnside and Allen. The story was one of Burnside's longest in his career, and created more discussion than he anticipated.

Burnside was president of the Professional Hockey Writers' Association (PHWA) from 2013 to 2017, which aimed to preserve access for North American media covering ice hockey. He thought the PHWA was facing new challenges since the number of newspaper and radio journalists were decreasing, and being replaced by social media, independent bloggers, and teams producing their own content. During his time as president, he oversaw voting by its members for end-of-season NHL awards, honours for all-stars and rookies, and establishment of two awards—the Jim Kelley Memorial Scholarship in the 2015–16 season for the child of a PHWA member, and the Red Fisher Award in the 2016–17 season for the top NHL journalist.

In 2017, ESPN laid off multiple hockey writers including Burnside. Burnside subsequently resigned as PHWA president, and succeeded by Mark Spector of Sportsnet.

=== Later career ===
Burnside began writing for the Dallas Stars in 2017, as a digital correspondent on the Stars and the NHL for the team's web site. He felt working for the Stars was a "revelatory hockey season", since he learned how an NHL team operated from an inside perspective.

From 2018 to 2021, Burnside was the national hockey writer for The Athletic. During this time, he wrote about the rise and fall of goaltender Ray Emery, who drowned in Lake Ontario at age 35.

Burnside joined Daily Faceoff in October 2021 as a senior writer. He also collaborated on a recurring ice hockey podcast with Pierre LeBrun, titled "Two-Man Advantage", discussing the NHL. Other organizations Burnside has written for include the Los Angeles Kings, Nashville Predators, Carolina Hurricanes, Minnesota Wild, and the National Hockey League Players' Association.

== Honours and reputation ==
The PHWA made Burnside lifetime member after serving as president, and selected him to receive the 2024 Elmer Ferguson Memorial Award at the Hockey Hall of Fame, in recognition of a career in ice hockey journalism. PHWA president Frank Seravalli stated, "Burnside is someone who is unafraid to ruffle feathers by reporting on difficult topics or to offer a cutting opinion", and that "He always remained true to himself, and gave back by mentoring countless young hockey writers along the way".

Burnside reportedly frequented dive bars, with one such bar in Pittsburgh was known as his "second office" by colleagues. His writing style was to "expose how and why it happened", and produce "pieces he [would] want to read himself", because "he [loved] the storytelling". Minnesota Wild general manager Bill Guerin stated, "No matter what the story is, whether negative or positive, you know [Burnside is] going to be fair", and that "People feel comfortable talking to him because they trust him, no matter the circumstances".

== Personal life ==
Burnside is married to Colleen McEdwards, has one son, plays hockey, baseball, and golf, and is a regular participant in sports betting pools. He resided in Essex, Ontario, while writing for the Windsor Star, and has lived in Metro Atlanta since 2002.
