= Dave Molinari =

American sports journalist (born 1955)

- Born: October 2, 1955 (age 71); Glassport, Pennsylvania, US
- Education: Penn State University (BA)
- Occupation: Journalist
- Spouse: Debbie (married)
- Children: 3
- Awards: Elmer Ferguson Memorial Award

Dave Molinari (born October 2, 1955, in Glassport, Pennsylvania) is an American sports journalist for the Pittsburgh Hockey Now in Pittsburgh, Pennsylvania, where he writes about the Pittsburgh Penguins team of the National Hockey League on a semi-regular basis.

== Early life ==
Molinari attended Elizabeth Forward High School and Penn State.

== Career ==
He began his career with the McKeesport Daily News before being hired by The Pittsburgh Press in 1980, and the Post-Gazette in 1993.

In 2009, Molinari was awarded the Elmer Ferguson Memorial Award for his 27-year coverage of the Pittsburgh Penguins. The award is given by the Professional Hockey Writers' Association for newspaper professionals and coincides with induction into the Hockey Hall of Fame.

In June 2019, Molinari moved to DK Pittsburgh Sports, a subscription website dedicated to covering Pittsburgh sports teams, as the Penguins beat reporter.

On May 2, 2022, it was announced that Molinari had moved to a new Pittsburgh Hockey Now subscription website.

== Personal life ==
He is married and has three children.
