= Tim Moriarty =

American sports journalist

- Born: May 5, 1923; Southbridge, Massachusetts, U.S.
- Died: January 23, 2006 (aged 82); Long Island, New York, U.S.
- Spouse: Laurie
- Children: 3
- Relatives: Andrew Tully (uncle)

Timothy Andrew Moriarty (May 5, 1923 – January 23, 2006) was an American sports journalist. He was awarded the Elmer Ferguson Memorial Award in 1986.

== Career ==
Moriarty was born on May 5, 1923. While living in Southbridge, Massachusetts, his uncle, Andrew Tully, hired him as the chief sports editor, photographer, and general assistant at the Southbridge Press.

In 1965, Moriarty was hired by Newsday and began to cover the New York Islanders, a National Hockey League (NHL) expansion team, in 1972.

In 1970, he was elected vice president of the National Hockey League Writers' Association. From June 1977 until June 1993, he also sat on the Hockey Hall of Fame Selection Committee. He was the Islanders beat reporter for Newsday that covered their dynasty seasons between 1979 and 1983, where they won the Stanley Cup four times. Following this, Moriarty won the Elmer Ferguson Memorial Award "in recognition of distinguished members of the newspaper profession whose words have brought honour to journalism and to hockey."

He died on January 23, 2006, at the age of 82.

== Selected publications ==
The following is a list of selected publications:

- The incredible Islanders (1975)
- Hockey's Hall of Fame (1974)
