= Eric Duhatschek =

Canadian sports journalist

- Born: 1956 (age 68–69)
- Education: University of Western Ontario (BA)
- Occupation: Journalist
- Awards: Elmer Ferguson Memorial Award

Eric Duhatschek (born 1956) is a Canadian sports journalist. Duhatschek won the 2001 Elmer Ferguson Memorial Award for distinguished ice hockey journalism and is a member of the Hockey Hall of Fame. Duhatschek is also on the selection committee for the Hockey Hall of Fame. Based in Calgary, Alberta, he was the lead hockey columnist for The Globe and Mail and was a writer for The Athletic. Duhatschek rose to prominence for his coverage of the Calgary Flames as a sportswriter for the Calgary Herald.

== Career ==
After graduating from the University of Western Ontario's grad school of journalism, Duhatschek was a freelancer writing about sports in the Toronto Sun and news in the Toronto Star when he was invited by The Albertan to be their ski writer, leading him to move to Calgary. In 1980, Duhatschek covered both skiing and ice hockey on the 1980 Winter Olympics, and after The Albertan was replaced by the Calgary Sun, Duhatschek was assigned to do a tryout for the Calgary Flames and write a report on his experience. The three-part series led him to receive an offer from the Calgary Herald, where he became one of their premier hockey writers for 20 years. In the period he also was a stringer for Sports Illustrated, was a regular on the Hockey Night in Canada segment Satellite Hot Stove, and started a collaboration of 25 years with The Hockey News, where he eventually got the back page column.

In 2000, Duhatschek joined The Globe and Mail as an online columnist. In 2001, Duhatschek was awarded the Elmer Ferguson Memorial Award by the Hockey Hall of Fame and was later elected for the selection committee for the Hockey Hall of Fame. On September 8, 2017, Duhatschek announced he was leaving The Globe to write for The Athletic.

After serving 15 years on the selection committee for the Hockey Hall of Fame, Duhatschek's term ended and he was replaced by Cassie Campbell-Pascall and Mark Chipman in 2018.

On November 8, 2024, Duhatschek announced he was retiring after 46 years as a sportswriter.

== Publications ==
The following is a list of publications:

- On fire: the dramatic rise of the Calgary Flames (1986)
- 100 years of hockey: the chronicle of a century on ice (1999)
- Starforce hockey: the greatest players of today and tomorrow (2000)
- One hundred and one years of hockey: the chronicles of a century on ice (2001)
- Hockey chronicles: an insider history of National Hockey League teams (2001)
- King of Russia: a year in the Russian Super League (2008)

== Personal life ==
Duhatschek has a son and daughter. His daughter Paula was awarded the inaugural Jim Kelley Memorial Scholarship by the Professional Hockey Writers' Association. His parents were Austrian immigrants, and he entered school not knowing English given they were still learning the language and only spoke German at home.
