= Dave Fay =

American sports journalist

- Born: March 5, 1940; Brighton, Boston, Massachusetts, U.S.
- Died: July 17, 2007 (aged 67); Monrovia, Maryland, U.S.
- Occupation: Journalist
- Spouse(s): Mary (died); Patricia (married)
- Children: 4
- Awards: Elmer Ferguson Memorial Award

David G. Fay Sr. (March 5, 1940 – July 17, 2007) was an American sports journalist. He was posthumously awarded the Elmer Ferguson Memorial Award in 2007 after dying of cancer. Prior to his death, Fay worked for The Washington Times covering the Washington Capitals and Washington Redskins. In his honor, a charity hockey game was formed to raise funds for Hockey Fights Cancer and the Capitals media dedicated an award in his name.

== Early life ==
Fay was born on March 5, 1940, to parents Leo and Mary Fay and one brother. After graduating from public school, Fay served in the United States Navy before beginning his journalism career after being honorably discharged.

== Career ==
In 1961, Warren Times-Mirror hired Fay as a journalist. While working for the Mirror, Fay toured Canada, the Soviet Union, and other parts of Europe. From there, he worked for various newspapers before joining The Washington Times as an assistant sports editor in 1982. However, Fay shortly thereafter began working as the Capitals beat reporter due to a lack of interest from other journalists. Until his death, Fay covered the Capitals for the Times in all but two years.

He was named a life member of the Professional Hockey Writers Association and the Professional Football Writers Association. In May 2007, the Hockey Hall of Fame announced that Fay was the winner of the 2007 Elmer Ferguson Memorial Award, however, he died of cancer before being able to receive the award.

== Personal life ==
After his first wife, Mary, died, Fay remarried to Patricia Delaney Fay. At the time of his death, Fay had four sons. In October of the season following his death, the Washington Capitals announced they had donated $10,000 to charity in his honor.

In his honor, Rob Keaton and Gavin Toner began a charity hockey game to raise funds for Hockey Fights Cancer.

Starting in the 2015–16 season, the Washington Capitals media awarded the Dave Fay Award for a player who best cooperates with the media. The first award was given to Karl Alzner. In the same year, the Capitals honored Fay in their Washington Capitals Media Wall of Fame.
