= Claude Larochelle =

Canadian hockey journalist

Claude Larochelle (May 6, 1931 – September 3, 2002) was a Canadian hockey journalist. During his career, Larochelle led a campaign to try and save the Quebec Nordiques franchise and is the only Quebec City journalist in the Hockey Hall of Fame.

== Career ==
Larochelle began his sports journalism career by founding the magazine Sports Revue and later became a freelance writer at L'Action catholique. He was eventually hired as a sports reporter for the Le Soleil where he led a campaign to try and save the Quebec Nordiques franchise.

While working at Le Soleil, Larochelle and fellow reporter Claude Bédard heard news about the formation of a new hockey league. Together, they flew to Los Angeles to meet with Gary Davidson and Dennis Murphy, and shortly thereafter returned to Montreal. On the flight back home, Bédard suggested that he and Larochelle buy the Quebec franchise but Larochelle rejected the notion. In spite of this, they worked alongside the first investors and agreed to support Marcel Aubut until 1995. Prior to the WHA General Player Draft, Larochelle, Bédard, and General Manager Marius Fortier worked together to draft a list of Quebecois players who might be willing to play for the inaugural Quebec Nordiques. When the Nordiques played their first game on October 13, 1972, Larochelle and Bédard received a congratulatory telegram from John Ferguson. He eventually wrote a French book about the Nordiques franchise, titled Les Nordiques et le circuit maudit in 1978.

On May 21, 1989, Larochelle and Frank Orr were named the recipients of the Elmer Ferguson Memorial Award, given by the Hockey Hall of Fame "in recognition of distinguished members of the newspaper profession whose words have brought honour to journalism and to hockey." He thus became the only Quebec City journalist to have his name engraved on the Hockey Hall of Fame. In spite of their efforts, the Nordiques franchise moved to Colorado in 1995. Nonetheless, Quebec journalist Réjean Tremblay applauded Larochelle and Bédard for their efforts to save the Nordiques franchise; "They were the basis for the arrival of the Nordiques with the AMH, then they fought for the merger with the NHL, the renovation of the Coliseum and the rescue." Larochelle heavily admonished the Nordiques move to Colorado and said, "Quebec City will become a cemetery."

Larochelle died on September 3, 2002, at the age of 71 due to illness.

== Selected publications ==
- Les Nordiques et le circuit maudit
- Les Nordiques: 10 Ans De Suspense
- Les Nordiques, dans la tradition du sport québécois par excellence
