= Yvette Lapointe =

Canadian designer and comics creator

- Born: 19 August 1912 Montreal, Quebec, Canada
- Died: 5 September 1994 (aged 82)
- Areas: designer; comics creator; illustrator
- Notable works: Les Petits Espiègles
- Awards: Prix Albert-Chartier

Yvette Lapointe (19 August 1912 – 5 September 1994) was a designer, known as a pioneer of Quebec comics, who made a career in comics and illustration from 1932 to 1943, then retired from publishing. She remains the first Quebec female comic book author, even though somewhat forgotten.

== Biography ==
Yvette Lapointe was born 19 August 1912 in Montreal. In 1932, she launched herself into comics and illustration, drawing on the relations between men and women and everyday life in the periodical L'Illustration, where she contributed daily to the strip Pourquoi?. A year later, she began her most famous series in the pages of La Patrie: Les Petits Espiègles, whose heroes are "two rascals", Réal and his sister Mimi Pistache. The series ran from May to August 1933. Lapointe then returned to more adult content for Le Samedi and La Presse. At the same time, she was an illustrator and did advertising work.

After her marriage in 1943, she ended her professional career and then raised four sons, all mathematicians. She died on 5 September 1994.

== Legacy ==
In 2017, Lapointe's works were exhibited at the Quebec Francophone Comics Festival. In tribute to Lapointe's career, the Quebec Francophone Comics Festival gave the name Prix Yvette-Lapointe to a youth comic book prize.

== Awards ==
- Posthumous award of the Prix Albert-Chartier.
