= Leo Monahan (sportswriter) =

American sportswriter (1926–2013)

- Born: December 13, 1926; Boston, Massachusetts, US
- Died: March 27, 2013 (aged 86); Belmont, Massachusetts, US
- Education: Boston College
- Occupation: Journalist
- Awards: Elmer Ferguson Memorial Award

Daniel Leo Monahan (December 13, 1926 – March 27, 2013) was an American sportswriter. He became a full-time journalist in 1950, and had a career which lasted 30 years combined with the Daily Record, the Record American, and the Herald American which then merged into the Boston Herald. He later contributed to Sports Illustrated and the Sporting News, and served as the director of information at the University of Massachusetts Boston. He traveled with and reported on the Boston Bruins, and was recognized with the Elmer Ferguson Memorial Award from the Hockey Hall of Fame for his journalism.

== Early life ==
Daniel Leo Monahan was born on December 13, 1926, in Boston, Massachusetts. His father Daniel Monahan was a printer for the Boston Evening Transcript, and died when Monahan was 11 years old. He grew up in South Boston, started delivering a paper route at age 14, and worked a 20-hour shift on weekends as a copy boy at the Daily Record. He enlisted in the United States Navy at age 17, and served for two years during World War II. After the war, he attended Boston College supported by G.I. Bill. He met his future wife Stella Frechette while dancing at Harvard Square in 1947. He graduated in 1950, and the couple married later in the same year.

== Career ==
Monahan became a full-time journalist in 1950. He adopted the name "D. Leo Monahan" to distinguish himself from similarly named writers, and jokingly said the initial "D" stood for "dazzling". Monahan's career as a journalist lasted 30 years combined with the Daily Record, the Record American, and the Herald American which then merged into the Boston Herald. His younger brother Bob Monahan wrote on college hockey for The Boston Globe. In 1958, he and Lynn Patrick co-published the book Let's Play Hockey! Monahan also contributed to Sports Illustrated as a correspondent for Boston, and recommended fellow Boston Globr journalist Mark Mulvoy as a columnist at Sports Illustrated. Monahan was later a columnist for the Sporting News, and served as the director of information at the University of Massachusetts Boston from December 1980 onwards.

Monahan traveled with the Boston Bruins on overnight train trips between games, and the younger writers were given the upper bunk for sleeping. He became friends with Bruins' player Milt Schmidt who said that, Monahan "was fair and he did not interrupt his writing with our friendship". One train ride Schmidt recalled that, "Leo was in the berth above me and I was down below. Throughout the night, he told me, he did not move for fear he would do something that would keep me awake".

Monahan described himself as a person who wrote his own opinions instead of just good publicity for any team he covered. He received the Elmer Ferguson Memorial Award from the Hockey Hall of Fame in 1986, in recognition of his hockey journalism as chosen by the Professional Hockey Writers' Association. Fellow sports journalist Bob Ryan described Monahan by saying, "His deep love for the sport resonated in every sentence and paragraph. He was a very strong personality, for sure, and extremely opinionated". According to Monahan's daughter, he used a manual typewriter for his career and frequently stated he did not like to use electronic typewriters or computers.

== Later life ==
Monahan retired from journalism in the mid-1990s then lived in Belmont, Massachusetts. He was married for 49 years and had four daughters. He died at his home on March 27, 2013, due to complications from Parkinson's disease. He was interred at St. Patrick's Cemetery in Watertown, Massachusetts.
