= Dulmage =

Surname list

Dulmage is a surname. Notable people with the surname include:

- Jack Dulmage (1918/19–1998), Canadian sports journalist
- Will E. Dulmage (1883–1953), American composer, lyricist, and music publisher

== See also ==
- Dulmage–Mendelsohn decomposition
