= Tony Gallagher =

Tony Gallagher may refer to:

- Tony Gallagher (editor) (born 1963), British newspaper editor
- Tony Gallagher (businessman) (born 1951), British property developer
- Tony Gallagher (footballer) (born 1963), Scottish footballer
- Tony Gallagher (Canadian journalist) (born 1948), Canadian journalist

== See also ==
- Tony Gallacher (born 1999), Scottish footballer
