= Marcel Desjardins (journalist) =

Canadian journalist, news editor and director

- Born: 28 April 1941; Grenville, Quebec, Canada
- Died: 10 February 2003 (aged 61)
- Education: University of Ottawa; University of Toronto
- Occupations: Journalist, editor and news director
- Known for: La Presse, Radio-Canada
- Notable work: Le Point
- Awards: Elmer Ferguson Memorial Award

Marcel Desjardins (28 April 1941 – 10 February 2003) was a Canadian journalist, news editor and director. He was a political correspondent for Le Droit and La Presse, before becoming an editor at Radio-Canada. He later returned to La Presse as the news director, then as the vice-president and assistant editor. He also covered ice hockey and was recognized with the Elmer Ferguson Memorial Award by the Professional Hockey Writers' Association.

== Career ==
Desjardins was born on 28 April 1941, in Grenville, Quebec. He began his career in journalism at age 17, writing for Le Carillon in Hawkesbury, Ontario. He moved to Ottawa in 1962, then worked part-time for Le Droit and attended the University of Ottawa. He married Micheline Danis in 1963, with whom he had three children. Desjardins later attended the University of Toronto, then became the political correspondent for Le Droit in 1967, covering the events in the House of Commons of Canada.

Desjardins joined La Presse in 1970, then became the National Assembly of Quebec. Desjardins was made an honorary member of the Professional Hockey Writers' Association in February 1971. He became the director of information for Montréal-Matin in 1976, then worked for Radio-Canada from 1979 to 1988, as the editor-in-chief of televised news broadcasts and as director of the political news program Le Point. He was also responsible for the current affairs program Impact. He received the Elmer Ferguson Memorial Award in 1984, in recognition of his hockey journalism. He was one of the founding governors of an organization established to oversee the National Newspaper Awards in 1989. He returned to La Presse as the news director in 1988, then became its vice-president and assistant editor in 1999.

== Death and legacy ==
Desjardins died on 10 February 2003, and was interred at St-Alphonse Cemetery in Hawkesbury. Fellow Quebec television journalist Pierre Nadeau described Desjardins by saying, "The man was as solid as a rock, physically and mentally. He had an unerring sense of news judgment. He also had a fabulous sense of humour. He had a way of handling difficult egos with charm, tact, refinement and strength". Jean Chretien, then the Prime Minister of Canada, knew Desjardins from his coverage at the House of Commons and remembered him for "his dynamic personality and his extraordinary talent".
