= Jim Burchard =

American ice hockey reporter

Jim Burchard (died May 30, 1960) is an American former ice hockey reporter for the New York World-Telegram and winner of the 1984 Elmer Ferguson Memorial Award.

== Career ==
Burchard began working at the New York World-Telegram in 1928 and spent 32 years as their sports writer. As a result, he received the 1984 Elmer Ferguson Memorial Award "in recognition of distinguished members of the newspaper profession whose words have brought honour to journalism and to hockey". During his career, Burchard was appointed president of the US Lawn Tennis Association and New York Hockey Writers Association.

As the United States entered World War II, Buchard served as a Lieutenant and correspondent for the Stars and Stripes, a military newspaper. He died on May 30, 1960, in Florida from a heart attack.
