= Jim Vipond =

Canadian sports journalist (1916–1989)

- Born: James French Vipond; July 11, 1911; Southport, Lancashire, England
- Died: December 4, 1989 (aged 73); Penetanguishene, Ontario, Canada
- Occupation: journalist
- Years active: 1938–1979
- Employer: The Globe and Mail
- Awards: Elmer Ferguson Memorial Award (1984)

James French Vipond (July 11, 1916 – December 4, 1989), was a Canadian sports journalist. A columnist for The Globe and Mail, he won the Elmer Ferguson Memorial Award in 1984 and is a member of the media section of the Hockey Hall of Fame. He joined the newspaper in 1938 and retired in 1979 to become the Ontario Athletics Commissioner. Vipond also served in World War II with the Royal Canadian Air Force, becoming a flight lieutenant and later being awarded the Distinguished Flying Cross. He died in 1989 from Alzheimer's disease.
