= Bertrand Raymond =

Canadian sports author and journalist

- Born: November 2, 1943 (age 81)
- Occupation(s): journalist, author
- Years active: 1971–2010
- Employer: Le Journal de Montréal

Bertrand Raymond (born November 2, 1943) is a Canadian sports author and journalist. A former columnist for Le Journal de Montréal, he won the Elmer Ferguson Memorial Award in 1990 and is a member of the media section of the Hockey Hall of Fame. Raymond started covering the Montreal Canadiens in 1971, and retired in 2010.

== Career ==
Raymond began his journalism career at Progrès-Dimanche, a Quebec based newspaper, before joining the Journal de Montréal. In 1990, Raymond was awarded the Elmer Ferguson Memorial Award by the Hockey Hall of Fame. He announced his retirement in 2010.
