= Jack Graney Award =

The Jack Graney Award is presented by the Canadian Baseball Hall of Fame & Museum to a member of the Canadian media for their contributions to the game of baseball in Canada. The award is not presented every year, but rather when the committee believes there to be a worthy candidate.

The award takes its name from Jack Graney, one of the first Canadian baseball players to enjoy success in the major leagues, and one of the first notable Canadian baseball broadcasters.

== Recipients of the award ==
Year	Name	Media outlet / contribution
1987	Neil MacCarl	Toronto Star
1988	Milt Dunnell	Toronto Star
1990	Dink Carroll	Montreal Star
1991	Hal Kelly	CKEY
1991	Joe Crysdale	CKEY
1996	Dave Van Horne	Montreal Expos radio and TSN
2001	Tom Cheek	Toronto Blue Jays radio
2002	Ernie Harwell	WXYT
2003	Allan Simpson	Baseball America
2004	Jacques Doucet	Montreal Expos radio
2005	Len Bramson	TBS Sports
2009	Ian MacDonald	Montreal Gazette
2010	Bob Elliott	Toronto Sun/Canadian Baseball Network
2011	W. P. Kinsella	Shoeless Joe
2012	Jerry Howarth	Toronto Blue Jays radio
2013	Rodger Brulotte	Montreal Expos radio and Toronto Blue Jays radio
2014	Richard Griffin	Toronto Star
2015	Serge Touchette	Montreal Expos
2016	Larry Millson	The Globe and Mail
2017	Alison Gordon	Toronto Star
2018	Jeff Blair	Sportsnet 590 The FAN
2019	Ken Fidlin	Toronto Sun
2020	Dan Shulman	ESPN
2021	John Lott	The National Post
2022	Richard Milo	The Canadian Press
2023	Buck Martinez	Sportsnet
2024	Dave Perkins	Toronto Star
2025	Hazel Mae	Sportsnet

== See also ==
- Canadian baseball awards
