= Kevin Allen (journalist) =

American sports journalist and author

Kevin Allen is an American sports journalist and author. He was the national hockey writer for USA Today from 1986 to December 2019. Allen has been editor of hockey website Detroit Hockey Now since leaving USA Today.

== Early life and education ==
Allen graduated from Wayne Memorial High School in 1974 and attended Eastern Michigan University. In his freshman year, he earned his first paid writing assignment with the university newspaper by interviewing Eastern Michigan football coach George Mans.

== Career ==
After university, Allen accepted a position with a local paper as a sports and political writer. He covered high school Native American reservation football and Arizona State football games. He began his sports journalism career with The Times Herald in 1982 as a writer covering the Detroit Red Wings from 1982 to 1986. As a reporter, Allen broke the news of Mario Lemieux coming out of retirement to play for the Pittsburgh Penguins. Of the incident Eric Duhatschek, Vice President of the Professional Hockey Writers Association, stated "That was a clean kill by Kevin. Nobody else had it. Local guys didn't get a whiff of it. National guys didn't get a whiff of it. Kevin got it. You only get stuff like that with one part asking the right question at the right time, but also having a lot of people in your sphere who trust you and to tell you things."

In 2003, Allen was elected president of the Professional Hockey Writers' Association. Allen has also authored 16 hockey-related books. He was awarded the Lester Patrick Trophy in 2013, for his contributions to hockey in the United States.

In 2014, Allen and Scott Burnside of ESPN, were the only two journalists given access by USA Hockey to the meetings on the selection process of the United States national team for ice hockey at the 2014 Winter Olympics. USA Hockey hoped that the resulting story would popularize the game in the USA, despite the criticism written about the process by Allen and Burnside.

Allen was the 2014 recipient of the Elmer Ferguson Memorial Award. In 2019, Frank Seravalli was elected the new president of the Professional Hockey Writers' Association and Allen was named secretary.
