= Marc de Foy =

Canadian author and sports journalist

- Occupation: Journalist
- Employer: Le Journal de Montréal

Marc de Foy is a Canadian sports journalist. A journalist for Le Journal de Montréal, he won the Elmer Ferguson Memorial Award in 2010 and is a member of the media section of the Hockey Hall of Fame.
