= Zotique Lespérance =

Canadian sportswriter (1910–2006)

Zotique Lespérance (November 16, 1910 – March 12, 2006) was a Canadian sportswriter. Lespérance worked as a sports writer and editor for several Montreal newspapers, including Le Petit Journal, Le Miroir des Sports, La Patrie, and L'Illustration. As journalists were poorly paid at the time, Lespérance accepted a position with Molson Brewery as a Sales Promotion Manager. Lespérance was inducted into the Hockey Hall of Fame in 1985 and received the Order of Canada before his death.

== Early life ==
Lespérance was born on November 16, 1910, in Montreal, Quebec. He left school at the age of 14 to work as a copy clerk at a local newspaper in order to support his family.

== Career ==
Lespérance began working as a sportswriter and editor for several Montreal newspapers, including Le Petit Journal, Le Miror des Sports, and L'Illustration. While working for L'Illustration, Lespérance met his future wife Brigitte Poison, an accountant who refused to date coworkers. As a result, he left his job at the newspapers and found work with La Patrie. As journalists were poorly paid at the time, Lespérance worked many jobs simultaneously. In 1945, Molson Brewery hired him as Sales Promotion Manager and later promoted him to Director of Public Relations. While working for Molson, CKAC Radio, and Le Petit Journal, he approached Jean Béliveau after a hockey game to convince him to sign with the Montreal Canadiens, which he eventually agreed to. Lespérance was also hired by the National Hockey League to develop bilingual Stanley Cup Finals films between 1953 and 1969. He would later assist in creating the Jean Béliveau Foundation for underprivileged children and in Molson's acquisition of the Montreal Canadiens and the Montreal Forum.

On March 6, 1962, Lespérance was appointed by Senator H. Molson to the position of assistant to the president of Molson's Brewery. The following year, he was named the chairman of the board of directors of the Federation of French Charities. He also stepped down as President of the Sportsmen's Association of Montreal and was replaced by J. Jack Baker. In 1965, Lespérance was promoted to vice-president of Molson's Brewery Quebec Ltd. before being appointed to vice-president of Molson's Industries Ltd. He also served as vice-chairman of the Loaned Executive Committee of the 1968 Federated Appeal.

== Honours and awards ==
In 1984, Lespérance was the recipient of the Order of Canada for his promotion of sports and his social and community efforts. The next year, he was inducted into the Hockey Hall of Fame's media section, along with Tim Moriarty and Dick Johnson, however, he was not invited to his induction ceremony as the Hall of Fame was misinformed that he had died. Lespérance would go on to appear at the ceremony the next year.

== Death ==
In Lespérance's later years, he was diagnosed with Alzheimer's disease and eventually died on March 12, 2006.
