= Lewis Walter =

American sports journalist (1905–1982)

- Born: December 14, 1905; Michigan, United States
- Died: September 29, 1982 (aged 76); Michigan, United States
- Occupation: journalist
- Employer(s): Detroit Free Press; Detroit Times
- Awards: Elmer Ferguson Memorial Award (1984)

Lewis H. Walter (December 14, 1905 – September 29, 1982) was an American sports journalist. A columnist for Detroit Times and Detroit Free Press, he won the Elmer Ferguson Memorial Award in 1984 and is a member of the media section of the Hockey Hall of Fame. He covered the Detroit Red Wings. Walter attended the University of Michigan and graduated in 1929. He died in 1982.
