= Hugh Delano =

American sports journalist

Hugh Stafford Delano (December 14, 1933 – April 5, 2015) was an American sports journalist who wrote for the New York Post and Newark Evening News. He covered the New Jersey Devils, New York Rangers, New York Yankees, and New York Mets. He wrote a biography about the life and career of goaltender Ed Giacomin entitled `Eddie, A Goalie's Story' (Atheneum, 1976). He won the Elmer Ferguson Memorial Award in 1991 and is a member of the Hockey Hall of Fame. He was born in Cranford, New Jersey and died at a hospital in Rahway, New Jersey in 2015 after a long illness.
