= Ted Damata =

Sports journalist

- Died: May 23, 1988
- Occupation: sports journalist for the Chicago Tribune
- Spouse: Eleanore
- Children: 4
- Awards: Elmer Ferguson Memorial Award

Ted Damata (died May 23, 1988) was an American sports journalist for the Chicago Tribune. He was awarded the Elmer Ferguson Memorial Award in 1984.

== Personal life ==
Damata was married to Eleanore Lapenda and together they had four children.

== Career ==
Damata began his sports writing career with the Chicago Daily News in 1929. From there, he became an assistant sports editor of the Chicago Daily Times, and later came to Chicago Tribune in the 1940s after the Times merged with the Chicago Sun. During his time at the Tribune, Damata formed a relationship with future Ferguson award winner Bob Verdi when the latter was beginning his career. Verdi worked under Damata until his retirement in 1975.

In 1984, Damata received the Hockey Hall of Fame's Elmer Ferguson Memorial Award, given "in recognition of distinguished members of the newspaper profession whose words have brought honour to journalism and to hockey." He died a few years later on May 23, 1988, at the age of 79.
