= Al Laney =

American sportswriter

- Born: Albert Gillis Laney; January 11, 1896; Pensacola, Florida, U.S.
- Died: January 31, 1988 (aged 92); Spring Valley, New York, U.S.
- Occupation: journalist
- Years active: 1920s–1966
- Employer(s): New York Evening Mail; New York Herald Tribune
- Awards: Elmer Ferguson Memorial Award (1984); Int. Tennis HoF Member Page (1979)

Albert Gillis Laney (January 11, 1896 – January 31, 1988) was an American sportswriter who specialized in tennis and golf but also covered baseball, boxing and American football.

== Biography ==
Laney was born on January 11, 1896 in Pensacola, Florida, the son of an attorney and one of six children. He served as a lieutenant in World War I and saw action at The Battle of the Argonne Forest.

After World War I, Laney became a correspondent at the New York Evening Mail. In 1924 he went to Europe and joined the Paris Herald, as the European edition of the New York Herald was known. During his period in Europe he also started working for the New York Herald Tribune. In the summer months he would travel between Paris and England to cover the Wimbledon tennis tournament, the Davis Cup and the British golf tournaments. In 1930 he returned to the United States to join the Tribune's sports staff, where he covered baseball, tennis and golf. He retired when the Tribune ceased publication in 1966.

In 1947, Laney published an account of the Paris Herald newspaper titled Paris Herald: The Incredible Newspaper and in 1968 he published Covering the Court; a 50-Year Love Affair With the Game of Tennis, a memoir on his experience as a tennis correspondent from World War I through to the start of the Open era.

Laney was regarded as one of the leading American tennis journalists of the first half of the 20th century together with Allison Danzig of The New York Times. In 1979, Laney was inducted into the International Tennis Hall of Fame in Newport, Rhode Island, for his contributions to tennis. He received the Elmer Ferguson Memorial Award in 1984 and is a member of the media section of the Hockey Hall of Fame.
