= Charlie Barton (journalist) =

Canadian sports journalist

- Born: 1919 or 1920
- Died: May 1972 (aged 52)
- Occupation: journalist
- Employer: Buffalo Courier-Express
- Awards: Elmer Ferguson Memorial Award (1985)

Charlie Barton (1919 or 1920 – May 1972) was a Canadian sports journalist. A former columnist for Buffalo Courier-Express, he won the inaugural James H. Ellery Memorial Award in 1965 for his coverage of the Buffalo Bisons of the American Hockey League and Elmer Ferguson Memorial Award in 1985 for his coverage of the National Hockey League's Buffalo Sabres. He is a member of the media section of the Hockey Hall of Fame. He died of cancer in 1972.
