= Philadelphia Journal =

American tabloid newspaper

The Philadelphia Journal was a tabloid newspaper published in Philadelphia, Pennsylvania from December 5, 1977, until December 15, 1981. The paper, described by the Associated Press, as "a tabloid that focused on sports, entertainment and crime", was the first venture into the United States market for the parent corporation, Quebecor, a Canadian publishing house.

== History ==
Jacques Beauchamp was the initial editor and said that the paper devoted 25–26 pages in each edition to sports; the first sports editor was Sy Roseman, a longtime journalist and public relations professional who had been the original PR director of The Spectrum, the Philadelphia Wings and the opening PR director for Resorts International Casino in Atlantic City. Doug Baily, the former UPI editor, was managing editor. Longtime local wire photo editor Ron Williams was the first photo editor. Typically about half the total pages featured sports. The paper utilized the composing room and pre-press operations of the rival Philadelphia Bulletin and was printed at satellite facilities around the Philadelphia area.

According to an obituary for owner Pierre Peladeau in the New York Times, the venture lost $15 million. An Associated Press article, published when the tabloid ceased publication, cited its circulation at that time about 100,000.

According to the Associated Press wire service, the decision to close the paper followed the unions' rejection of management's demand to save $3 million annually by laying off 43 of the 157 employees, and wage concessions. Quebecor, the paper's owner, intended to convert the tabloid to an all-sports format if the savings were realized.

Originally, Peledeau told Time magazine he hoped to expand his sensationalist, sports-oriented paper to other cities, such as Atlanta, Boston, Detroit and Los Angeles but none of this came about.

Roughly a month after the Journal ceased publishing, The Philadelphia Bulletin also ceased publication, leaving the city with only one newspaper owner and two titles: The Philadelphia Inquirer and the Philadelphia Daily News.
