= Joe Nichols (journalist) =

American sports journalist

- Born: Giuseppe Fappiano; July 16, 1905; New Haven, Connecticut, U.S.
- Died: December 23, 1984 (aged 79); Rego Park, Queens, New York, U.S.
- Occupation: Journalist
- Years active: 1923–1975
- Employer: The New York Times
- Awards: Elmer Ferguson Memorial Award (1984)

Giuseppe Fappiano (July 16, 1905 – December 23, 1984), known as Joseph C. Nichols, was an American sports journalist. A columnist for The New York Times, he won the Elmer Ferguson Memorial Award in 1984 and is a member of the media section of the Hockey Hall of Fame. He joined the Times in 1923 as a copy boy, and became a reporter in 1925. Besides hockey, he also covered boxing and thoroughbred racing. He retired in 1975 and died of a heart attack in 1984.
