= Tony Gallagher (Canadian journalist) =

Canadian journalist

- Born: 1948 (age 77–78); Vancouver, British Columbia, Canada
- Education: 1966, Vancouver College; BA, political science and economics, University of British Columbia
- Occupation: Journalist
- Spouse: Susan
- Children: 3
- Awards: Elmer Ferguson Memorial Award

Tony Gallagher (also known as "The Undertaker;" born 1948) is a Canadian journalist. He was a sports columnist for The Province, focusing primarily on hockey, basketball, and tennis until his retirement. In 2020, he was the recipient of the Elmer Ferguson Memorial Award for excellence in hockey journalism.

== Early life and education ==
Gallagher was born in 1948. He graduated from Vancouver College in 1966 and attended the University of British Columbia (UBC) for his Bachelor of Arts degree in political science and economics. While enrolled at UBC, Gallagher worked for the school paper, The Ubyssey, covering local sports. In 1967, he approached The Province sports editor Don Brown and asked if he could write game stories on the UBC Thunderbirds men’s basketball team; Brown agreed and paid him $10 per story.

== Career ==
Upon graduating from UBC, Gallagher was immediately hired by The Province as their local sports journalist, covering the WHL’s New Westminster Bruins and the Vancouver Blazers. By 1976, he became a beat reporter for the Vancouver Canucks of the National Hockey League (NHL) and earned his own sports column in 1987 while also expanding his coverage to tennis, motorsport and basketball. During his tenure as a beat reporter, Gallagher earned the nickname "The Undertaker" from Canucks General Manager Jake Milford for his "dogged pursuit of a story and willingness to bury someone when called for." He covered the Canucks' 1982 Stanley Cup Finals loss to the New York Islanders, which he later published in his first co-authored book titled Towels, Triumph and Tears: The Vancouver Canucks and Their Amazing Drive to the 1982 Stanley Cup Final.

As a sports columnist, Gallagher participated in public feuds with Canucks general managers Pat Quinn and later Brian Burke. During Quinn's tenure as GM, Gallagher uncovered that he sent a trainer with a $100,000 cheque to a Los Angeles Kings morning skate at the Coliseum and signed an illegal bonus when becoming the team's new general manager. By the time of his death in 2014, Gallagher said "I changed my mind about Pat rather late in life. I realized so many people loved him. And when there are so many people whose value and judgment you trust love a guy, then he must be all right." He also uncovered how Quinn failed to make transfer payments to Russia, which was used by the cross examiners against Quinn. Gallagher left The Province to work in sports radio at CKWX and then took a two-year sabbatical. Upon his return, Burke attempted to bar Gallagher and Province writers from the dressing room and penned a letter to the editor-in-chief Brian Butters ordering him to fire Gallagher. Butters refused and ran the letter on the front page in an act of defiance. Burke reasoned his letter by accusing Gallagher of “scurrilous editorial attacks.” Burke argued that the animosity between him and Gallagher stemmed from him refusing to give Gallagher "the scoop on his Vancouver appointment" in 1998.

By the time Gallagher retired from The Province in 2015, he had covered three Winter Olympics including hockey, speed skating, figure skating, and skiing.

=== Awards and honours ===
In 2013, Gallagher was inducted into Vancouver College's Hall of Honour. While vacationing with his wife in Hawaii in 2018, he was informed that he had been inducted into B.C. Sports Hall of Fame and returned home early to attend the induction ceremony. Two years later, Gallagher was named the recipient of the Elmer Ferguson Memorial Award for excellence in hockey journalism.

== Selected publications ==
- Towels, Triumph and Tears: The Vancouver Canucks and Their Amazing Drive to the 1982 Stanley Cup Final (1982)

== Personal life ==
Gallagher and his wife have three children together.
