= Bob Verdi =

American Chicago Blackhawks team historian

Robert Verdi
- Born: 1944 or 1945 (age 81–82) (Note: In 2016, Verdi was reported to be 71); Port Washington, New York, US
- Education: Lake Forest College (BA)
- Occupation: Chicago Blackhawks team historian
- Awards: Elmer Ferguson Memorial Award

Robert Verdi is the Chicago Blackhawks team historian. Verdi has worked for the Chicago Tribune, Golf Digest, and Golf World during his career and he was named Illinois Sportswriter of the Year 19 times. Verdi was awarded the Elmer Ferguson Memorial Award by the Hockey Hall of Fame in 2016.

== Career ==
Verdi grew up in Port Washington, New York, and attended Paul D. Schreiber High School before attending Lake Forest College in 1963. At Lake Forest College, Verdi worked for the student newspaper, The Stentor, while majoring in English. After graduation, he earned a job at the Chicago Tribune. From 1967, Verdi worked full time for the Tribune before joining Golf Digest and Golf World in 1997. As such, Verdi then transitioned to a weekly columnist for the Tribune until 2009. While with the newspaper, Verdi covered the Chicago Blackhawks and was elected president of the Professional Hockey Writers' Association, succeeding Dan Stoneking. As the Blackhawks beat reporter, he almost always called the team "King Arthur's Knights" when it was owned by Arthur Wirtz and addressed the Toronto Toros as the "Toronto Lawn Mowers" in reference to The Toro Company. In 2004, Verdi received the PGA of America Lifetime Achievement Award in Journalism and in 2005 was inducted into the Illinois Golf Hall of Fame.

In 2010, Verdi was named the Chicago Blackhawks team historian. Amongst other tasks, this job entailed writing stories about the team's history on the team's website. While with the Blackhawks organization, Verdi was awarded the Memorial Golf Journalism Award in 2012. Later, in 2016, he was awarded the Elmer Ferguson Memorial Award by the Hockey Hall of Fame. During his career, Verdi was also selected as Illinois Sportswriter of the Year 19 times.

== Publications ==
The following is a list of publications:

- McMahon! (1987)
- Holy Cow! (1989)
- Once a Bum, Always a Dodger (1991)
- Chicago Blackhawks : Seventy-five Years (2000)
- The Golden Jet (2010)
- One Goal Achieved: The Inside Story of the 2010 Stanley Cup Champion Chicago Blackhawks (2010)
- One goal II: The Inside Story of the 2013 Stanley Cup Champion Chicago Blackhawks (2013)
- One goal. III: The Inside Story of the 2015 Stanley Cup Champion Chicago Blackhawks (2015)
