= Ben Olan =

American sportswriter and journalist (1923–2019)

- Born: March 31, 1923
- Died: November 11, 2019 (aged 96)
- Occupations: journalist, author
- Years active: 1952–c.2003
- Employer: Associated Press

Ben Olan (March 31, 1923 – November 11, 2019) was an American sports author and journalist. A former sports writer for the New York Associated Press, he won the Elmer Ferguson Memorial Award in 1987 and is a member of the media section of the Hockey Hall of Fame. He joined the Associated Press in 1952 as a sports writer, covering hockey, and retired after 51 years in the profession, around 2003.
