= Larry Brooks (journalist) =

American sports journalist (1950–2025)

- Born: February 26, 1950; New York, New York, U.S.
- Died: November 13, 2025 (aged 75); New York, New York, U.S.
- Occupation: Journalist

Lawrence Mel Brooks (February 26, 1950 – November 13, 2025) was an American ice hockey journalist for the New York Post, covering the New York Rangers of the National Hockey League.

== Life and career ==
Brooks was born in New York City on February 26, 1950. From 1982 until 1992, Brooks was a senior vice president of communications in the New Jersey Devils organization.

He served as president of the Professional Hockey Writers' Association from 2001 to 2003. He was awarded the Elmer Ferguson Memorial Award from the Hockey Hall of Fame in 2018.

On November 13, 2025, Brooks died from cancer in New York City, at the age of 75.
