= Rex MacLeod =

Canadian sports journalist

- Born: John Alexander MacLeod; July 11, 1911; Cape Breton, Nova Scotia, Canada
- Died: April 7, 1995 (aged 74); Toronto, Ontario, Canada
- Occupation: journalist
- Years active: 1940s–1987
- Employer(s): The Globe and Mail; Toronto Star
- Awards: Elmer Ferguson Memorial Award (1987)

John Alexander "Rex" MacLeod (March 30, 1921 – April 7, 1995), was a Canadian sports journalist. A columnist for The Globe and Mail and Toronto Star, he won the Elmer Ferguson Memorial Award in 1987 and is a member of the media section of the Hockey Hall of Fame. MacLeod served in World War II with the Royal Canadian Air Force and entered the newspaper industry after the war, with the Guelph Mercury. He retired in 1987.
