= Elmer Ferguson =

Canadian sports journalist

- Born: February 25, 1885; Charlottetown, Prince Edward Island, Canada
- Died: April 26, 1972 (aged 87); Montreal, Quebec, Canada
- Occupations: Journalist, sportswriter

Elmer Ferguson (February 25, 1885 – April 26, 1972) was a Canadian sports journalist. Born in Charlottetown, Prince Edward Island, Ferguson moved to Montreal in 1910 and became the sports editor of the Montreal Herald in 1913. Ferguson was one of the most respected and prominent columnists of his time. He became a Hockey Hall of Fame media honouree in 1982 and was the namesake of the Elmer Ferguson Memorial Award.

== Career ==
At the age of six, Ferguson started selling newspapers on the streets of Moncton, New Brunswick and became a copy boy with the Moncton Transcript when he was 17. He soon became a sportswriter with the paper and became the news editor in 1910. With Ferguson as editor, the Moncton Transcript became the first Maritime newspaper to print a full sports page every day.

Soon after, Ferguson left for Montreal where he got a job as an editor at the Montreal Herald. He became sports editor of the paper in 1913 and soon became a well-known sports journalist with his column "The Gist and the Jest of It". He was sports editor for the paper for 39 years and continued to write columns until the Herald folded in 1957. He continued to write columns for The Montreal Star until a few months before his death in 1972.

In addition to his work in the print media, he was also a colour commentator on radio broadcasts for the Montreal Maroons (1933–1938) and the Montreal Canadiens (1938–1952), where he was partnered with Doug Smith.

Ferguson was inducted into Canada's Sports Hall of Fame as a builder in 1968. In 1984, Ferguson was recognized as one of the first Hockey Hall of Fame media honourees. The award that is given out was named the Elmer Ferguson Memorial Award in his honour.
