= Frank Brown (journalist) =

American sports journalist

- Born: 1952 or 1953 (age 73–74) (Note: On June 11, 2018, Brown was reported to be 65)
- Occupations: Journalist; NHL communications executive
- Years active: 1970 – 2018
- Awards: Elmer Ferguson Memorial Award

Frank Brown (born 1952 or 1953) is an American sports journalist and former National Hockey League (NHL) communications executive. During his career, Brown has worked for the New York Daily News, The Associated Press, and the NHL as a communications executive. After retiring in 2018, Brown was awarded the Elmer Ferguson Memorial Award by the Hockey Hall of Fame.

== Career ==
Brown published his first paid hockey article in a 1970 New York Rangers game program for $50 from the Rangers public relations director. From there, he began his career as a journalist for The Associated Press, typically covering the Montreal Canadiens. Under the leadership of Stan Fischler, Brown stated he learned the "courage of my convictions" after being handed Gordie Howe's phone number. Following this, Brown joined the New York Daily News in 1980 until 1998. In 1993, Brown published "New York Rangers: Broadway Blues." The following year, during the New York Rangers 1994 Stanley Cup Final series, Brown covered the game with John Dellapina, Colin Stephenson, John Giannone, and Barry Meisel. Of the series, Brown wrote “It is a one-game season now for the New York Rangers, who will write history either as the biggest bunch of choking dogs or the most memorable group of players the franchise ever assembled.”

After the win by the New York Rangers, Brown gave up his beat reporting gig at the New York Daily News and joined the NHL as a communications executive in 1998 until his retirement in 2018. As the NHL's vice president of media relations, Brown called the membership of Canadian Medical Association "dumbass doctors" for criticizing the NHL's inaction regarding on-ice violence and traumatic brain injuries. Despite this, Brown was subsequently awarded the 2019 Elmer Ferguson Memorial Award by the Hockey Hall of Fame.

== Selected publications ==
- A Day in the Life of the National Hockey League (1996)
- New York Rangers: Broadway Blues (1993)
- Hockey Scouting Report 1992-1993
