= The Boston Record =

American newspaper (1884–1961)

The Boston Evening Record
- Type: Daily newspaper
- Format: Broadsheet
- Publisher: Advertiser Newspaper Company
- Founded: September 3, 1884
- Ceased publication: September 30, 1961
- Language: English
- Headquarters: Boston, Massachusetts, United States

The Boston Record was founded on September 3, 1884 by The Boston Daily Advertiser as an evening campaign newspaper. The Record was so popular that it was made a permanent publication. It was the first tabloid-format newspaper in New England.

Begun as the Afternoon Record, it was bought by William Randolph Hearst in 1921 and known as the Daily Record by the 1930s. It was merged with another Hearst newspaper, the Evening American, to form the Record American in 1961. In 1972, this was merged into the Boston Herald-Traveler, which later became the Boston Herald.

== Notable staff ==
- Leo Monahan – sports journalist who wrote for the Daily Record and the Record American
- Elliot Norton - theater critic

== See also ==
- The Boston Daily Advertiser
- The Boston Herald
- The Boston Globe
- The Boston Journal
- The Boston News-Letter
- The Boston Post
- The Boston Evening Transcript

== Bibliography ==
- Stanwood, Edward.: Boston Illustrated: Containing Full Descriptions of the City and Its Immediate Suburbs, Its Public Buildings and Institutions, Business Edifices, Parks and Avenues, Statues, Harbor and Islands, Etc., Etc. With Numerous Historical Allusions, Houghton, Mifflin and Co, The Riverside Press, (1886) p. 104.
