= Art Spander =

American sportswriter (born 1938)

Arthur Melvin Spander (born August 30, 1938) is an American sportswriter. He is a free-lance columnist for the San Francisco Examiner.

== Early life ==
Born in Los Angeles, California, Spander is a graduate of Dorsey High School and UCLA (a Daily Bruin sports editor). Spander was blinded in his left eye at age 8, thanks to a “roundhouse” when roughhousing with other kids.

== Career ==
Spander began his career as a news writer for United Press International in Los Angeles in 1960, and started writing sports full-time in 1963 for the Santa Monica Outlook where he was the beat writer for the Los Angeles Rams and Los Angeles Dodgers and covered UCLA and USC football and basketball. In 1965 he moved to the San Francisco Chronicle, where he covered golf, football, baseball and basketball. Spander became the lead sports columnist for the San Francisco Examiner in 1979.

Spander has covered 50 consecutive Masters Tournaments, 40 Super Bowls, 47 U.S. Open golf tournaments, “between 35 and 40” PGA Championships, 36 Open Championships, 33 Wimbledons, 20 US Open tennis tournaments, and the NCAA men's Final Four 34 times. He has also attended 67 consecutive Rose Bowl Games, initially as a spectator and vendor, and later as a journalist; he attended his 70th Rose Bowl in 2024 (regarding it as an unbroken streak by not counting the 2021 Rose Bowl played in Arlington, Texas due to the COVID-19 pandemic). He missed a Pasadena-based playing of the game for the first time in 2025 due to health issues.

In addition to his newspaper work, Spander is a contributor to various sports magazines. He is also a frequent commentator on sports talk radio. Spander had a regular gig on ESPN radio in the late 1990s and was often on the Gary Radnich Show on KNBR 680 in San Francisco.

He has also written or co-authored three books: "Golf The Passion and The Challenge" with Mark Mulvoy, 1977; "The Art Spander Collection", foreword by Al Michaels, 1989, Taylor Publishing; and "Keeping On Course, Golf Tips on Avoiding the Sandtraps of Today's Business World" with Gary Shemano, 1997, McGraw-Hill.

Spander wrote the foreword for "The Good, the Bad, and the Ugly Los Angeles Lakers: Heart-Pounding, Jaw-Dropping, and Gut-Wrenching Moments from Los Angeles Lakers History", written by Steve Travers, 2007, Triumph Books.

== Awards ==
In 1999, he was awarded the Dick McCann Memorial Award, earning him a spot in the Pro Football Hall of Fame. In 2007 he was honored with the Masters Major Achievement Award and in 2009, he was recognized by the PGA of America with its Lifetime Achievement in Journalism award. Spander was elected to the U.S. Basketball Writers Association Hall of Fame.

== Personal life ==
Spander and his wife Liz reside in Piedmont, California. He has two daughters, Wendy, a publicist for Electronic Arts, and Debbie, a sports and entertainment lawyer in Los Angeles.

== Honors and legacy ==
He was voted "California Sports Writer of the Year" by his peers in 1980. He is the only person to win Golf Writers Association of America first-place awards in each of five decades.

On August 22, 2016, The Tournament of Roses announced Bobby Bell, Ricky Ervins, Tommy Prothro, and Art Spander would be inducted into the Rose Bowl Hall of Fame in the Class of 2016. The Rose Bowl Hall of Fame Induction Ceremony then took place on January 1, 2017, outside the Rose Bowl Stadium, one day before the kickoff of the 103rd Rose Bowl Game on Monday January 2, 2017.
