= Dink Carroll =

Canadian sports journalist

- Born: Austin Carroll; November 12, 1899; Guelph, Ontario
- Died: April 8, 1991 (aged 91); Montreal, Quebec
- Education: McGill University
- Occupation: journalist
- Years active: 19??–1987
- Employer: Montreal Gazette
- Awards: Elmer Ferguson Memorial Award (1984); Jack Graney Award (1990)

Austin "Dink" Carroll (November 12, 1899 – April 8, 1991) was a Canadian sports journalist. A columnist for the Montréal Gazette, he won the Elmer Ferguson Memorial Award in 1984 and is a member of the media section of the Hockey Hall of Fame. He also won the Jack Graney Award in 1990 from the Canadian Baseball Hall of Fame and is a member of the Canadian Football Hall of Fame (1986). Carroll attended McGill University, where he played on the football team. He earned a LL.B. degree from there in 1923, but never practiced law. He wrote a column for the Gazette from 1941 to 1987.
