= Francis Rosa =

American sports journalist (1920–2012)

- Born: November 7, 1920; Boston, Massachusetts, US
- Died: January 4, 2012 (aged 91); Lexington, Massachusetts, US
- Education: Harvard College
- Occupation: Sports journalist
- Years active: 1949–1991
- Employer: The Boston Globe
- Awards: Elmer Ferguson Memorial Award

Francis James Rosa (November 7, 1920 – January 4, 2012) was an American sports journalist. He worked for The Boston Globe from 1949 to 1991, became the paper's morning sports editor in 1966, and helped build it into a leading sports publisher. He covered the Boston Bruins during their Stanley Cup championships in 1970 and 1972, and was considered "one of the family" by team general manager Harry Sinden. Rosa received the Elmer Ferguson Memorial Award in recognition of his journalism from the Hockey Hall of Fame in 1987.

== Early life and education ==
Francis James Rosa was born on November 7, 1920, in Boston, to Charles Rosa and Eustachia Calamaria. His father was a barber, and both parents were immigrants from Italy. Rosa was the youngest child of five, was a paperboy as a youth, and began working with The Boston Globe as a copy boy in the sports department prior to World War II.

Rosa served in the United States Army during the war and was promoted to sergeant in 1943. His promotion was covered in a story in The Boston Globe, which noted he was assigned to write about the completion of the Alaska Highway for an army publication. He married Ruth Baroni in 1944. After the war, he studied English at Harvard College with assistance from the G.I. Bill and graduated in 1949. He worked part-time at The Boston Globe as a student, and wrote a story in July 1948 about Ted Williams telephoning best wishes to a dying Babe Ruth.

== Journalism career ==
Rosa began working full-time with The Boston Globe in 1949, where he spent the remainder of his journalism career. He was named sports editor of the morning edition of The Boston Globe in March 1966. He and evening sports editor Ernie Roberts hired writers who built the paper into a "powerhouse" sports publisher, which including the hiring of basketball reporter Bob Ryan by Rosa. Rosa returned to a reporting role by the 1970s, covered the Boston Bruins championships of the 1970 Stanley Cup Finals and the 1972 Stanley Cup Finals, and traveled with the team during the season.

Rosa was among the first reporters in the 1980s to use a computer for writing instead of a typewriter. He served as president of the Professional Hockey Writers' Association from 1981 to 1985. He received the Elmer Ferguson Memorial Award from the Hockey Hall of Fame in 1987, in recognition of his hockey journalism as selected by the Professional Hockey Writers' Association. He had also received the Eastern College Athletic Conference Media Award prior to 1987. He retired from The Boston Globe in August 1991.

=== Style and reputation ===
Boston Bruins general manager Harry Sinden spoke about Rosa stating, "He became one of the family". "In those days, we didn't seem to have the wall that's between some of the writers and teams today. I went to dinner with him many times on the road and thought of him as a good friend." Hockey players were candid with Rosa, who filled articles with many quotes from them to bring their perspective of the game to the public.

Journalist Kevin Dupont wrote that Rosa built relationships with athletes and gained their trust and respect. He described Rosa as "a man with a keen sense of how to take his work seriously, write with accuracy, clarity, and style, and with no ego or self-importance". Dupont said that Rosa was beloved by everyone involved on the team and "You never heard a discouraging word from the players about Fran." Rosa was reported by colleagues at The Boston Globe to dress dapper, be unflappable, and finish the night with a post-game Scotch whisky.

== Personal life and death ==
Rosa was the father of three boys and one daughter. He gardened as a hobby. Later in life he had heart and lung problems, which led to his death at home in Lexington, Massachusetts, on January 4, 2012. He was interred at Westview Cemetery in Lexington.
