= Helene Elliott =

American sportswriter

Helene Elliott is an American sportswriter. She worked for the Los Angeles Times from 1989 to 2024. She is the first female journalist to receive the Elmer Ferguson Memorial Award in 2005 for bringing "honor to journalism and to hockey". She served as president of the Professional Hockey Writers' Association from 1999 to 2001.

== Biography ==
She was born and raised in Brooklyn, New York to a Jewish family.

One of the first women to cover the sport, Elliott began her career in the late 1970s when many locker rooms and press boxes were closed to women, except by court order. As such, she often had to wait for hours after games ended to conduct interviews. She has covered almost all major events in ice hockey, including nearly every Stanley Cup Final since 1980, the "Miracle on Ice" defeat of the Soviet Union national team by the U.S. team in the 1980 Winter Olympics, and the growth of hockey on the West Coast fueled by Wayne Gretzky's arrival to the Los Angeles Kings.

In 2006, after many years of covering hockey and Olympic sports, she became a general sports columnist.

Elliott is a graduate of Northwestern University Medill School of Journalism.

She was married to late author Dennis D'Agostino, a former publicist with the New York Mets and New York Knicks.

In 2015, she was inducted into the Southern California Jewish Sports Hall of Fame.

On February 16, 2024, Elliott announced that she had accepted a buyout from the Los Angeles Times, with her last day on the job after more than 34 years being scheduled for February 27 of the same year.
