= Jack Dulmage =

Canadian sports journalist

- Born: 1918 or 1919
- Died: August 2, 1998 (aged 79); Windsor, Ontario, Canada
- Occupation: sports journalist
- Spouse: Phyllis
- Awards: Elmer Ferguson Memorial Award

Jack Roberts Dulmage (1918 or 1919 – August 2, 1998) was a Canadian sports journalist for the Windsor Star. He was awarded the Elmer Ferguson Memorial Award in 1984.

== Career ==
A veteran of World War II in the Royal Canadian Air Force, Dulmage began his sports writing career with the Windsor Star in 1945 and became sports editor and a columnist in 1959. He retired in 1982. Dulmage was also a founding member and secretary-treasurer of the National Hockey League Writers' Association and a member of the Baseball Writers' Association of America. He died of complications from multiple sclerosis in 1998, aged 79.
