= Dick Johnston (journalist) =

Canadian sports journalist

- Born: June 11, 1919; Buffalo, New York
- Died: November 6, 2008 (aged 89); Boston, Massachusetts
- Education: Cornell University
- Occupation: journalist
- Years active: 1939–1984
- Employer: The Buffalo News
- Awards: Elmer Ferguson Memorial Award (1986)

Richard W. Johnston (June 11, 1919 – November 6, 2008), was a Canadian sports journalist. A columnist for The Buffalo News, he won the Elmer Ferguson Memorial Award in 1986 and is a member of the media section of the Hockey Hall of Fame. He joined the paper in 1939 and retired in 1984.
