= Bill Brennan (journalist) =

Canadian sports journalist (1920–1992)

- Born: December 16, 1920; Chatham, Ontario, Canada
- Died: October 15, 1992; Superior, Michigan, US
- Occupations: journalist, author
- Known for: The Detroit News; Professional Hockey Writers' Association
- Awards: Elmer Ferguson Memorial Award (1987)

Bill Brennan (December 16, 1920 – October 15, 1992) was a Canadian sports journalist. Born in Chatham, Ontario, he was a columnist for The Detroit News and received the Elmer Ferguson Memorial Award in 1987, inducting him as a member of the media section of the Hockey Hall of Fame. He covered the Detroit Red Wings.

Brennan was president of the Professional Hockey Writers' Association from 1974 to 1975, succeeded by Dan Stoneking.

Brennan died on October 15, 1992 in Superior, Michigan of a heart attack.
