= Tom Fitzgerald (journalist) =

American sports journalist (1912–1983)

- Born: April 6, 1912; Boston, Massachusetts, US
- Died: October 11, 1983 (aged 71); Weymouth, Massachusetts, US
- Occupation: Sports journalist
- Employer: The Boston Globe
- Awards: Lester Patrick Trophy; Elmer Ferguson Memorial Award

Thomas Joseph Fitzgerald (April 6, 1912 – October 11, 1983) was an American sports journalist. He worked for The Boston Globe, reported regularly on the Boston Bruins for more than 30 years, and wrote as a golf correspondent for the Masters Tournament and the U.S. Open. He was the first president of the Professional Hockey Writers' Association and the first sportswriter to receive the Lester Patrick Trophy for service to ice hockey in the United States. He was a member of the Hockey Hall of Fame selection committee for ten years and was the first journalist to be chairman of the committee. His hockey journalism career was posthumously recognized with the Elmer Ferguson Memorial Award from the Hockey Hall of Fame.

== Early life ==
Thomas Joseph Fitzgerald was born on April 6, 1912, in Boston, to Irish-American parents Mary Anne Reegan and Thomas Fitzgerald, who worked as a shipping superintendent. He grew up in the Dorchester neighborhood and played ice hockey in Franklin Park. He graduated from Boston Latin School in 1929, then attended Boston University before he dropped out to become a copy boy at The Boston Globe.

== Career ==
Fitzgerald became the golf correspondent for The Boston Globe in 1937, began covering the Boston Bruins in 1940, and played as a defenseman on the newspaper's hockey team. He served in the United States Army during World War II and landed with the 6th Engineer Brigade at Omaha Beach. He earned four battle stars during his service, and he became an information specialist in the army while reporting on the war.

Fitzgerald resumed beat reporting on the Boston Bruins after the war. His favorite players were Milt Schmidt and Terry O'Reilly, and he covered Bobby Orr's whole tenure with the Bruins. Fitzgerald was the first president of the Professional Hockey Writers' Association, serving from 1967 to 1968. He was a member of the Hockey Hall of Fame selection committee from June 1973 to June 1983, and was the first newspaper reporter to be chairman of the committee.

Fitzgerald covered the Masters Tournament and the U.S. Open golf championships, wrote a Sunday golf column, edited the annual Globe Golf Preview and the instructional golf series, Home Pro's Notebook. He was a president of the Boston Golf Writers' Association, was a member of the inaugural board of directors for the Golf Writers' Association of America, then become its president in 1946. He oversaw the annual Boston Globe Boys Golf Tournament during the 1960s and 1970s.

Fitzgerald also covered the Boston Marathon, boxing events, college football, and served as president of the St. Francis de Sales Society for Boston Catholic journalists. He retired from The Boston Globe in 1977.

Fitzgerald became the first sportswriter to receive the Lester Patrick Trophy when he was honored in 1978, in recognition of service to hockey in the United States. He was an honorary life member of the Professional Hockey Writers' Association, which voted to recognize his hockey journalism career with the Elmer Ferguson Memorial Award from the Hockey Hall of Fame in 1984.

== Reputation ==
The Boston Globe described Fitzgerald and Phil Esposito as "one of Boston's great hockey pairings", when they both received the Lester Patrick Trophy in the same year. National Hockey League president Clarence Campbell felt that Fitzgerald was the most deserving media person for the award, and Bruins' coach Harry Sinden stated that Fitzgerald was well respected in the league and "had a compassion for the problems that arose on the team".

Golf journalist Ernie Roberts reported that Fitzgerald never played the game, but had a good rapport with the players and earned their respect. Massachusetts Golf Association executive director Dick Haskell stated, "Tom did as much as any golf writer to promote the sport".

Colleagues at The Boston Globe reported that when a publishing deadline was approaching, Fitzgerald regularly responded to distracting conversations with sarcasm by asking, "Is my typing disturbing you"? Fellow Globe journalist Ray Fitzgerald was not related to Tom Fitzgerald, but referred to him as "Uncle Tom" out of respect. Ray Fitzgerald wrote in 1978 that Tom Fitzgerald was a frequent guest commentator on television and radio, and reportedly held the Guinness world record for "the accumulation of complimentary raincoats, Panasonic radios and Cross pens".

== Personal life ==
Fitzgerald was married to Shirley Yuhas, secretary to Weston Adams who owned the Boston Bruins. The couple had one daughter and one son, and resided in Scituate, Massachusetts. He died from cancer on October 11, 1983, at the South Shore Hospital in Weymouth, Massachusetts. He was interred at Fairview Cemetery in Scituate.
