= Jim Kelley =

American sports journalist (1949–2010)

- Born: James Thomas Kelley Jr. October 26, 1949; Buffalo, New York
- Died: November 30, 2010 (aged 61); Buffalo, New York
- Occupation: journalist
- Years active: 1981–2010
- Employer: The Buffalo News
- Awards: Elmer Ferguson Memorial Award (2004)

James Thomas Kelley Jr. (October 26, 1949 – November 30, 2010) was a professional sports news columnist from South Buffalo. His 30-year career focused primarily on the Buffalo Sabres of the National Hockey League, and the greater Buffalo area. He started covering the Sabres in 1981 for The Buffalo News, and also went on to cover the Stanley Cup Final for 23 straight years. He pursued other media besides newspaper writing. He originated the weekly "Hockey Night in Buffalo", as well as "Sharpshooters" on WNSA with partner Mike Robitaille. From time to time he continued to contribute various hockey articles to ESPN.com and FOXSports.com. His experience and knowledge of hockey led The Hockey News to proclaim him in 2002–03 as one of the "100 People of Power and Influence in Hockey."

Kelley served as president of the Professional Hockey Writers' Association from 1993 to 1999. He was a regular co-host on Prime Time Sports, a columnist for Sports Illustrated, and wrote a hockey column for Sportsnet.ca; he continued writing columns for Sportsnet up until his death, with his final column being published the day of his death.

== Honors ==
Kelley was a three-time president of the Professional Hockey Writers Association. He also won the 1994–95 New York State Publisher's Award for Sports Writing Excellence, and was named one of the top five hockey writers in North America by ESPN. He was chosen as a member of the Hockey Hall of Fame Media Selection Committee, and a Staff Consultant to the International Olympic Committee (IOC) for the 1998 Winter Olympics in Nagano, Japan. In 2004, Kelley earned one of hockey's highest honors, receiving the Elmer Ferguson Memorial Award, and induction into the Hockey Hall of Fame. One year later, he was inducted into the Greater Buffalo Sports Hall of Fame. He was also inducted into the Buffalo Sabres Hall of Fame on January 1, 2011

== Hašek incident ==
One of the most notorious moments of Kelley's career came in the 1996–97 NHL season, while he was covering the Buffalo Sabres' first round playoff series against the Ottawa Senators. After Sabres goaltender Dominik Hašek claimed to be injured with a knee pop in Game Three of the series, Kelley wrote a column the next day that accused Hašek of having "poor mental toughness." After Game Five of the series, Kelley approached Hašek for an interview. When he saw Kelley, Hašek unexpectedly yelled at him, pushed him and subsequently ripped his shirt off. He later issued a formal apology to Kelley, and was suspended three games and fined $10,000 for his actions.

== Cancer ==
In his Sportsnet.ca column on December 24, 2009, Kelley revealed that had pancreatic cancer. He died at the age of 61 at Buffalo General Hospital on November 30, 2010. Earlier that morning at 1:30 a.m. (EST), he filed his final column for Sportsnet.ca. The subject was the Toronto Maple Leafs' status on the second anniversary of the hiring of Brian Burke as its general manager.
