= La Patrie (Canadian newspaper) =

Logo from 1897 to 1962.

La Patrie (French pronunciation: [la patʁi]) was a Montreal, Quebec daily newspaper founded by Honoré Beaugrand on February 24, 1879. It became a weekly in 1957 and folded in 1978.

Its political affiliation was originally Liberal, but Beaugrand officially broke with the party in 1891 and the paper became deprived of its traditional support group. La Patrie's circulation numbers sagged until Beaugrand, in declining health, sold his newspaper for $50,000 to Joseph-Israël Tarte in 1897.

By the turn of the twentieth century Tarte had turned his new property into an increasingly nonpartisan publication with the city's second-largest circulation for a French-language daily newspaper (topped only by La Presse). The victim of bitter circulation wars against old rival La Presse and the politically connected Montréal-Matin, The daily La Patrie folded on November 15, 1957, but was survived by a weekly edition under the same name published until April 1978.

== Notable people ==
- Yvette Lapointe (1912-1994), comic strip series creator of Les Petits Espiègles, the series running in La Patrie from May to August 1933
- Charles Mayer (1922 to 1933), sportswriter and municipal reporter
- Télesphore Saint-Pierre, redactor

== See also ==
- List of Quebec media
