= Milt Dunnell =

Canadian sportswriter (1905–2008)

- Born: December 24, 1905; St. Marys, Ontario, Canada
- Died: January 3, 2008 (aged 102); Toronto, Ontario, Canada
- Occupation: Sportswriter

Milton William Ryan Dunnell (December 24, 1905 – January 3, 2008) was a Canadian sportswriter, known chiefly for his work at the Toronto Star.

== Early life ==
Dunnell was born in St. Marys, Ontario, Canada on December 24, 1905, and attended St. Marys Collegiate Institute.

== Career ==
After graduating, he worked part-time for the post office and a sales representative for a fruit company. Dunnell became a full-time local correspondent for the Stratford Beacon Herald in 1929 and stayed as a sports editor until 1942. During his time in Stratford, Dunnell met his future wife Dorothy Theresa Pigeon and they married in the rectory, not a church, due to their mixed religions. Dunnell eventually became the sports editor for the Toronto Star where he wrote on almost all sports during his career, including the Olympic Games, Stanley and Grey Cup events, and the Kentucky Derby.

During his sports reporting career, Dunnell placed his wallet in his righthand hip pocket, which caused him to be repeatedly pickpocketed. Despite urges to move his wallet, he refused, and fellow reporter Jim Coleman would walk paces behind him to ensure there were no thieves.

== Awards ==
By the end of his career, he was awarded the Elmer Ferguson Memorial Award and Jack Graney Award. He was also inducted into the Canadian Football Hall of Fame, Canadian Horse Racing Hall of Fame, Ontario Sports Hall of Fame, and Canadian Sports Hall of Fame. On June 10, 2006, the City of Toronto named a baseball diamond after Dunnell.

Dunnell died on January 3, 2008, at the age of 102 at North York General Hospital of pneumonia.
