= Andrew Tully =

American writer (1914–1993)

Andrew F. Tully Jr. (October 24, 1914 – September 27, 1993) was an American writer, including war reporter and columnist. He also wrote some eighteen fiction and non-fiction books, translated in multiple languages.

As a war reporter for the Boston Traveler newspaper during World War II, he was one of the few American journalists to enter Berlin with the Russian troops in April 1945. He wrote the column Capital Fare from 1961 until 1987.

== Early life ==
Tully was born in Southbridge, Massachusetts, where he began his newspaper career at the Southbridge News the summer after graduating from high school. At the age of 21, he became the youngest newspaper publisher in the United States when he purchased the weekly Southbridge Press.

== Bibliography ==
- 1947: Era of Elegance
- 1949: Yankee Salesman
- 1958: Treasury Agent: The Inside Story
- 1960: When They Burned the White House, illustrated by Milton Glaser (reprinted 1961)
- 1960: A Race of Rebels
- 1962: Capitol Hill
- 1962: CIA: The Inside Story (translated into French, 1962; German, 1963; and Vietnamese, 1988)
- 1963: Berlin: Story of a Battle (translated into Dutch, French (1963, reprinted 1969), Italian (1963) and Japanese; reprinted 1977)
- 1963: Supreme Court
- 1964: Where Did Your Money Go?: The Foreign Aid Story (with Milton Britten)
- 1966: The F.B.I.'s Most Famous Cases (translated into French, 1967; and Italian, 1968)
- 1967: White Tie and Dagger
- 1967: The Time of the Hawk
- 1969: The Super Spies
- 1973: The Secret War Against Dope
- 1974: The Brahmin Arrangement
- 1980: Inside the FBI (reprinted 1987)
- 2010: Andrew Tully on Everything (a collection of 100 columns)
