= Red Fisher (journalist) =

Canadian sports journalist

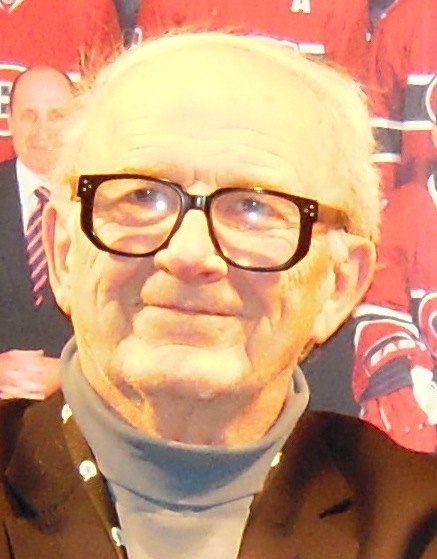
- Fisher in December 2009
- Born: Saul Fisher; 22 August 1926; Montreal, Quebec, Canada
- Died: 19 January 2018 (aged 91)
- Occupation: Sports journalist
- Years active: 1955–2012
- Spouse: Tillie Fisher (m. 1948; died 2018)

Saul "Red" Fisher, CM (22 August 1926 – 19 January 2018) was a Canadian sports journalist who wrote about the National Hockey League and the Montreal Canadiens in his newspaper column. Fisher received the Elmer Ferguson Memorial Award in 1985. He was inducted into the International Jewish Sports Hall of Fame in 1999, and became a Member of the Order of Canada (CM) in 2017.

== Biography ==
Fisher was born in Montreal in 1926 and was given the nickname "Red" for the colour of his hair as a young man.

Fisher began his hockey reporting for The Montreal Star on 17 March 1955, the night of the Richard Riot. He remained as writer and sports editor until the Star's demise in 1979. He then joined the Montreal Gazette as sports editor (for a short time), where his columns continued to appear.

He covered the Montreal Canadiens when they won the Stanley Cup five times in a row in the 1950s, and during their dynasty years in the 1960s and 1970s. Fisher said Habs legend Dickie Moore was his closest friend. He was also at the 1972 Summit Series between NHL players and the Soviet national team. Fisher was known for his "no-nonsense approach" to his career, such as his refusal to talk to rookies and walk away if a player answered his questions with cliches.

Fisher served as president of the Professional Hockey Writers' Association from 1968 to 1970. He was the longest-serving beat writer to cover an NHL team. Over his career, he worked for ten editors and publishers, and won the Canadian National Newspaper Award three times. His retirement was announced by Gazette publisher Alan Allnutt in a column on 8 June 2012. He continued to write guest articles for the Gazette until his death.

Fisher died at the age of 91 on 19 January 2018. His wife of 69 years, Tillie Fisher, had died ten days earlier.

== Books ==
- Fisher, Red (15 October 1994). Hockey, Heroes and Me. McClelland & Stewart. ISBN 978-0-7710-3147-2.
