= Red Burnett =

Canadian sports journalist

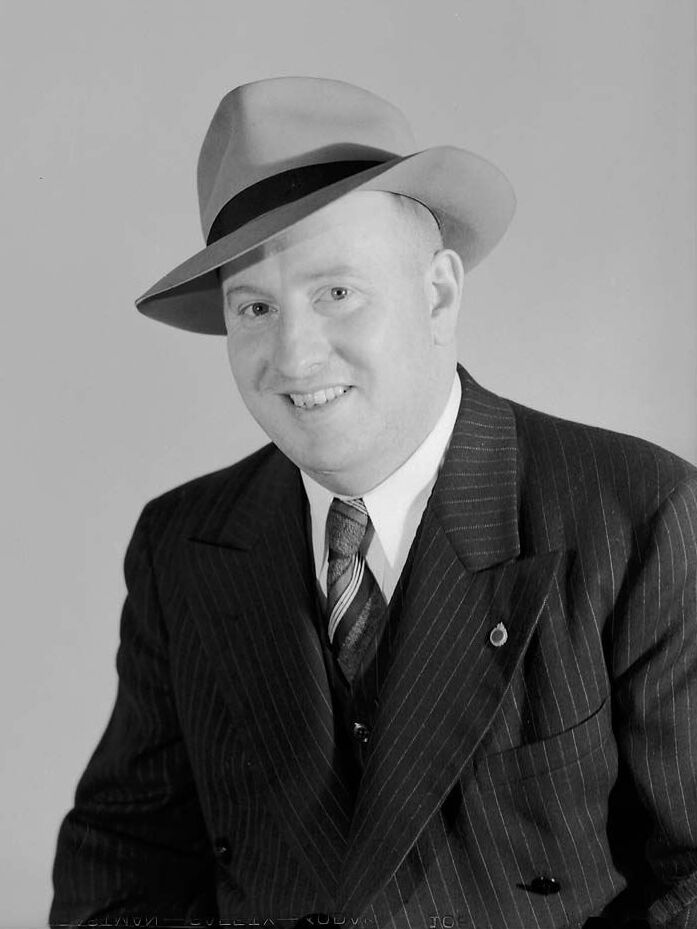
- Burnett, c. 1950s
- Born: Robert James Burnett; 1910 or 1911
- Died: April 1, 1979 (aged 68); Scarborough, Ontario
- Occupations: journalist, author
- Years active: 1927–1975
- Employer: Toronto Star
- Awards: Elmer Ferguson Memorial Award (1984)

Robert James "Red" Burnett (1910 or 1911 – April 1, 1979) was a Canadian sports journalist. A columnist for the Toronto Star, he won the Elmer Ferguson Memorial Award in 1984 and is a member of the media section of the Hockey Hall of Fame. Burnett joined the Star in 1927 originally as a copy boy, and retired in 1975. He died of a heart attack in 1979 at the age of 68. At the time of his death, he had returned to the Star to work as a copy editor as part-time job.
