= Frank Orr =

Canadian journalist (1936–2021)

- Born: William Franklin Orr; May 28, 1936 near Hillsburgh, Ontario, Canada
- Died: February 13, 2021 (aged 84); Toronto, Ontario, Canada
- Occupation(s): journalist, author
- Years active: 1962–2021
- Employer: The Toronto Star
- Spouse: Shirley Turner (m. 1961; died 2019)

William Franklin Orr (May 28, 1936 – February 13, 2021) was a Canadian sports author and journalist.

== Career ==
Born and raised on a farm near Hillsburgh, Ontario, Orr attended Guelph Collegiate and started out working for radio stations in Chatham and Sault Ste. Marie. He also was a sports editor with the Guelph Mercury and Cornwall Standard-Freeholder. He joined the Toronto Star in 1961, and covered the National Hockey League, and specifically the Toronto Maple Leafs. He also wrote on the 1972 Summit Series and several IIHF World Junior Hockey Championships. He has also authored over 30 books related to sports and has contributed to over 60 additional titles.

He won the Elmer Ferguson Memorial Award and was inducted into the Hockey Hall of Fame in 1989 in the media category, and received a lifetime achievement award from Sports Media Canada in 2003. In 2004, he was honoured with an induction into the Etobicoke Sports Hall of Fame. Orr was inducted into the Canadian Motorsport Hall of Fame in 2021, with voters citing his contribution to motorsport coverage in The Toronto Star as significant to Canadian motorsport.

Orr resided in Etobicoke with his wife Shirley. He died on February 13, 2021, at the age of 84.
