= Michael Farber =

American author and sports journalist

- Born: September 1951 (age 75)
- Occupations: Journalist, author
- Employer(s): Sports Illustrated; Montreal Gazette

Michael Farber (born September 1951) is an American author and sports journalist, and was a writer with Sports Illustrated from 1994 to 2014. He covered mostly ice hockey and Olympic sports. Before 1994, Farber spent 15 years as a sports columnist for the Montreal Gazette, and previously wrote for the Bergen Record, and the Sun Bulletin. Farber is a commentator for CJAD 800 AM in Montreal, and on The Sports Network's The Reporters.

Farber grew up in Bayonne, New Jersey. He graduated from Rutgers University in 1973, and is a Phi Beta Kappa Society member. He relocated to Montreal in 1979. He won the Elmer Ferguson Memorial Award in 2003, and was a member of the Hockey Hall of Fame selection committee from June 2007 to December 2022.
