= Montréal-Matin =

Daily newspaper based in Montréal, Québec, Canada

- Format: Tabloid
- Founded: 1930
- Ceased publication: 1978
- Political alignment: Conservative Party of Quebec, then Union Nationale
- Language: French
- Headquarters: Montreal, Quebec, Canada

Montréal-Matin ("Montreal-Morning") was a Quebec daily newspaper based in Montreal. It was published from 1930 to 1978. It was politically associated to the Conservative Party of Quebec and, afterwards, its successor the Union Nationale. It was known as L'Illustration from 1930 to 1936 and L'Illustration Nouvelle from 1936 to 1941.

It was the first French newspaper in Montreal to adopt the tabloid format. In 1964, the arrival on the market of Pierre Péladeau's Le Journal de Montréal, another tabloid similar in its target popular demographic, created a notable competition between the two. The decline of the Union Nationale also brought hardship. Montréal-Matin was sold to La Presse in 1973 and folded in 1978.

== Notable staff ==
- Marcel Desjardins — director of information (1976 to 1979)

== See also ==
- List of Quebec historical newspapers
- List of Quebec media
- Politics of Quebec
- List of newspapers in Canada

== Sources ==
- Noël, Mathieu (2014). Le Montréal-Matin (1930-1978), un journal d'information populaire [Online Resource] (PDF) (in French). Montreal: Université du Québec à Montréal. Thesis - Doctorate in history.
- Bourdon, Joseph (1978). Montréal-Matin, son histoire, ses histoires (in French). Montréal: La Presse. pp. 282. ISBN 0777702045. LCCN 79367245.
- Felteau, Cyrille (1984). Histoire de La Presse - tome 2: Le plus grand quotidien français d'Amérique (in French). Montréal: Éditions La Presse. pp. 284. ISBN 2-89043-135-5.
- Rumilly, Robert (1973). Maurice Duplessis et son temps. Vies canadiennes (in French). Vol. 2 (1944-1959). Montréal: Fides. p. 747. ISBN 0-7755-0460-2.
