= Frank Seravalli =

American sports reporter (born 1988)

- Born: May 7, 1988 (age 38); Philadelphia, Pennsylvania, U.S.
- Occupation: NHL Insider
- Known for: TSN, SportsCentre

Frank Seravalli (born May 7, 1988) is an American sports reporter. He is an ice hockey insider and former President of Hockey Content at Daily Faceoff and contributor to Sportsnet and Bally Sports broadcasts of the NHL. He was previously a Hockey Insider for Canadian sports network TSN.

== Early life and education ==
Seravalli attended Pennsylvania State University and Columbia University.

== Career ==
Seravalli joined Daily Faceoff (DFO) in June 2021, helping launch the content wing of the DailyFaceoff web site. In addition to breaking news and reporting as an Insider, he oversees all content aspects of the site, co-hosts the Daily Faceoff Show digital stream and the DFO Rundown podcast. Additionally, he is a regular contributor to Canadian sports network Rogers Sportsnet on television and Sportsnet Radio, as well as American regional broadcaster Bally Sports throughout the hockey season.

On the morning of the 2021 NHL expansion draft, Seravalli stirred minor controversy by leaking most picks of the draft set to take place that evening, which some fans argued tainted the surprise and excitement of the event.

Prior to Daily Faceoff, Seravalli served at TSN as Senior Hockey Reporter for breaking NHL news for TSN's web site. He regularly appeared on SportsCentre, That's Hockey, TSN Radio and other TSN Hockey specials from 2015 to 2021.

Seravalli began his career covering the Philadelphia Flyers at the Philadelphia Daily News for six seasons from 2009 to 2015.

In 2019, Seravalli was elected as president of the Professional Hockey Writers' Association (PHWA).

On May 5, 2025, Seravalli announced he would be leaving DailyFaceoff. In his announcement, he stated that his departure was his own choice.
