= Beat reporting =

In-depth journalism on an issue or topic

Beat reporting, also known as specialized reporting, is a genre of journalism focused on a particular issue, sector, organization, or institution over time.

== Description ==
Beat reporters build up a base of knowledge on and gain familiarity with the topic, allowing them to provide insight and commentary in addition to reporting straight facts. Generally, beat reporters will also build up a rapport with sources that they visit again and again, allowing for trust to build between the journalist and their source of information. This distinguishes them from other journalists who might cover similar stories from time to time.

Journalists become invested in the beats they are reporting for, and become passionate about mastering that beat. Beat reporters often deal with the same sources day after day, and must return to those sources regardless of their relationship with them. Those sources may or may not be pleased with the reporting of the reporters. It is pertinent that beat reporters contact their sources quickly, obtain all necessary information, and write on deadline.

According to media sociologists, beat reporting occurs because of the limited time reporters are given to cover stories. For big scoops, beats are not necessarily as useful as other journalism types. Some of the best inside stories, such as the Bay of Pigs Invasion and the Watergate scandal, did not come from beat reporting.

Beat reporters collect information from each person they meet while reporting. They routinely call, visit, and e-mail sources to obtain any new information for articles. When reporters have experience on a specific beat, they are able to gain both knowledge and sources to lead them to new stories relating to that beat. Beats are able to help reporters define their roles as journalists, and also avoid overlap of stories within the newsroom.

In sports, many professional teams have beat reporters assigned, such as for teams within Major League Baseball (MLB) or the National Football League (NFL). Many beat reporters work for major websites such as MLB.com or The Athletic, or for major newspapers such as The Washington Post or Los Angeles Times.

== Etymology ==
The term comes from the noun beat in the sense of an assigned regular route or habitual path, as for a policeman. By analogy, the beat of a reporter is the topic they have been assigned for reporting. Similarly, a beat reporter will follow the same routes or habitual paths in collecting new information on a specified topic. The role of the reporter is to deliver the news, show the story according to their perspective and observations, give us the insights, comment on it and to submit the report of the issues on the given period of time.

== Prizes ==
Several organisations award prizes for beat reporting, of which the Pulitzer Prize for Beat Reporting, which was discontinued in 2007 before being reintroduced in 2026, is possibly the best known. Other awards that have a category for beat reporting include the Gerald Loeb Awards, the Canadian National Newspaper Awards, and the SEJ Awards.
