= Professional Hockey Writers' Association =

Professional ice hockey journalists

The Professional Hockey Writers Association (PHWA) is a North American professional association for ice hockey journalists writing for newspapers, magazines and websites. The PHWA was founded in 1967 and has approximately 180 voting members. The association was founded as the National Hockey League Writers' Association, then renamed itself to the Professional Hockey Writers' Association in 1971.

== Functions ==
PHWA members vote for the following seven National Hockey League (NHL) individual awards: Hart Memorial Trophy, Lady Byng Memorial Trophy, Calder Memorial Trophy, James Norris Memorial Trophy, Conn Smythe Trophy, Bill Masterton Memorial Trophy, and Frank J. Selke Trophy. Members of the National Hockey League Broadcasters' Association vote for the Jack Adams Award (coaching), while the NHL general managers vote for the Vezina Trophy (top goalie). Members of the National Hockey League Players' Association vote for the Ted Lindsay Award. There are several other NHL awards, including the Mark Messier NHL Leadership Award and the Jim Gregory General Manager of the Year Award.

The members of the PHWA also vote for the Elmer Ferguson Memorial Award, presented by the Hockey Hall of Fame to professional hockey writers.

The association is dedicated to "preserving the rights and improving the access for members of the North American–based media who cover the sport of hockey all over the world". In 2015, president Scott Burnside thought the PHWA was facing new challenges since the number of newspaper and radio journalists were decreasing, and being replaced by social media, independent bloggers, and teams producing their own content.

== History ==
The association was founded as the National Hockey League Writers' Association, then renamed itself to the Professional Hockey Writers' Association in 1971, to distinguish itself from NHL teams.

Following a physical altercation between Detroit Red Wings' coach Doug Barkley and a Newark Star-Ledger reporter during the 1975–76 season, president Dan Stoneking protested to NHL president Clarence Campbell writing that the PHWA was "appalled, disgusted and angered over the incident" which denied post-game access to the team locker room, and demanded a public apology while the assault charges were under investigation.

During the 1976 Stanley Cup Final, Stoneking supported equal access to locker rooms for male and female sportswriters. When Montreal Canadiens' coach Scotty Bowman opposed females in the locker room until the players were dressed, female reporters contested that access was required to do their job as timely as their male counterparts to meet publication deadlines. Stoneking presented the PHWA case to NHL president Campbell that both males and females should be allowed or neither. He claimed that approximately half of NHL teams allowed females to post-game access the locker rooms as of the 1977–78 season, and three quarters of teams by the 1980–81 season.

== Presidents ==
List of presidents of the National Hockey League Writers' Association (1966–1971), and the Professional Hockey Writers' Association since 1971:

Years	President	Media employment	Ref
1966–1968	Tom Fitzgerald	The Boston Globe	
1968–1970	Red Fisher	Montreal Star	
1970–1971	George Gross	Toronto Telegram	
1971–1972	Jack Berry	Detroit Free Press	
1972–1974	Red Burnett	Toronto Star	
1974–1975	Bill Brennan	The Detroit News	
1975–1977	Dan Stoneking	Minneapolis Star	
1977–1979	Bob Verdi	Chicago Tribune	
1979–1981	Bill Fleischman	Philadelphia Daily News	
1981–1985	Francis Rosa	The Boston Globe	
1985–1987	Rod Beaton	USA Today	
1987–1993	Scott Morrison	Toronto Sun	
1993–1999	Jim Kelley	The Buffalo News	
1999–2001	Helene Elliott	Los Angeles Times	
2001–2003	Larry Brooks	New York Post	
2003–2013	Kevin Allen	USA Today	
2013–2017	Scott Burnside	ESPN	
2017–2018	Mark Spector	Sportsnet	
2019–2025	Frank Seravalli	The Sports Network	
2025–present	Stephen Whyno	Associated Press	

== See also ==
- List of National Hockey League awards
- National Sports Media Association
