= List of Quebec media =

This is a list of Quebec media.

== News services ==
- CNW Telbec
- La Presse Canadienne

== Newspapers ==
=== Daily ===
- 24 Heures (Quebecor)
- Le Devoir (independent)
- Le Droit – produced in Ottawa, but also distributed in Gatineau and elsewhere in Outaouais
- La Presse (independent) online-only since 2018
- Le Soleil (Quebec)
- La Tribune (Sherbrooke)
- La Voix de l'Est (Granby)
- Le Nouvelliste (Quebec)
- Le Quotidien (Saguenay)
- Le Journal de Montréal (Quebecor)
- Le Journal de Québec (Quebecor)
- Montreal Gazette (Postmedia) In the English language.
- Métro (TC Transcontinental)
- North Shore News In the English language. Ended September 4, 1980.
- The Record (Sherbrooke) (Alta Newspaper Group)

=== Weekly ===
- Les Affaires (TC Transcontinental)
- Allô Police (defunct 2004)
- Dimanche-Matin (defunct 1985)
- Voir (Communications Voir)
- Hour Community (defunct 2012)
- Le Petit Journal
- Midnight (moved to Florida)
- Montréal-Matin (defunct 1978)
- Montreal Mirror (defunct 2012)
- Montreal Standard (defunct 1951)
- Photo-Journal (defunct 1981)
- Westmount Examiner (defunct 2015)
- West Island Chronicle (defunct 2015)
- Quebec Chronicle-Telegraph
- The Suburban

=== Monthly ===
- L'aut'journal (independent)
- L'Action nationale (independent)
- Le Québécois (independent)
- Cult MTL (independent)

=== University and CEGEP ===
- Concordia University
  - The Link
  - The Concordian
  - L'Organe
- Université du Québec à Montréal
  - Montréal Campus
- Université de Montréal
  - Quartier Libre
  - Forum
  - Le Polyscope (École Polytechnique de Montréal)
  - L'intérêt (École des Hautes Études Commerciales de Montréal)
- McGill University
  - TVMcGill
  - McGill Reporter
  - McGill Tribune
  - The McGill Daily
  - Le Délit français
- Bishop's University
  - The Campus
- Université de Sherbrooke
  - Le Collectif
- Université Laval
  - Impact Campus
  - La Marmite sociale
  - Le Fil des évènements
- Université du Québec à Chicoutimi
  - Le Griffonnier
- Cégep Régional de Lanaudière à Joliette
  - Le Détour
- Cégep du Vieux Montréal
  - Le Bagou
  - L'ultimatum
  - Le p'tit vieux
- Cégep John Abbott
- Dawson College
  - The Plant

== Magazines ==
=== General interest ===
- L'actualité
- L'Agora
- Maisonneuve
- http://bestkeptmontreal.com/ (online magazine)
- URBANIA

=== Literary and cultural ===
- Liberté
- Nouveau Projet

=== Women ===
- Châtelaine

=== Humour ===
- Safarir
- Urbania

=== Literature ===
- Nuit blanche
- Solaris

=== Cinema ===
- 24 images
- Hors Champ
- Séquences

=== Celebrity ===
- Échos Vedettes

== Internet ==
=== Monthly ===
- Alternatives

== See also ==
- Culture of Quebec
- List of Quebec television series
- Politics of Quebec
- Quebec
