= History of Canadian newspapers =

There were five important periods in the history of Canadian newspapers' responsible for the eventual development of the modern newspaper. These are the "Transplant Period" from 1750 to 1800, when printing and newspapers initially came to Canada as publications of government news and proclamations; followed by the "Partisan Period from 1800–1850," when individual printers and editors played a growing role in politics. The "Nation Building Period from 1850–1900," when Canadian editors began the work of establishing a common nationalistic view of Canadian society. The "Modern period" from 1900 to 1980s saw the professionalization of the industry and the growth of chains. "Current history" since the 1990s saw outside interests take over the chains, as they faced new competition from the Internet.

== Transplant period 1750-1800 ==
There were no printing presses at this time, and no newspaper of any kind, under the French regime. All the newspapers in the British colonies had been transplanted from the 13 American colonies.

The press in Canada was born as a tool of the government to print official government documents. "The discovery of such unrealized potential frightened the powers that be, who commenced a centuries-long period of harassment and intimidation in order to check what today is called the power of the press". Information that was hostile to the government was definitely not welcome especially after the end of the American Revolution in 1783. It brought a wave of United Empire Loyalists.

Eventually, the Canadian printers began the process of printing more than just government news and proclamations. Many of the early editors and printers were government or influential personalities who used their newspapers as instruments of their own political beliefs; and suffered great hardships at the hands of the government because of the oppression they faced. There was little local news printed, and little news from other Canadian places, since there was no system of exchanging newspapers among editors. The first advertising started to appear in the 1780s. The Quebec Gazette of 12 July 1787 had a classified ad:

For sale, a robust Negress, active and with good hearing, about 18 years old, who has had small-pox, has been accustomed to household duties, understands the kitchen, knows how to wash, iron, sew, and very used to caring for children. She can adapt itself equally to an English, French or German family, she speaks all three languages.

=== Gazettes and American transplants ===
This was the period that introduced print culture to British North America and began fostering a reading public. All newspapers but The Upper Canada Gazette were started by Americans. In 1783, some 60,000 Loyalists migrated after the American Revolution, with around 30,000 moving to Canada- bringing printing presses with them. All of the first newspapers started life as official government organs. They were all dependent on government patronage and printed solely information condoned by the government. In every province, there was a weekly "Gazette" (named after The London Gazette, the English governmental organ since 1665) that carried the many notices colonial administrators wanted to circulate.

At this time, there was no "political sphere", as all political news was controlled by the elite. In the early decades of British North America, the primary purpose of the press was to propagate official propaganda - freedom of the press was an alien idea. Prior to the approximate turn of the 18th into the 19th century, there was no "public sphere" in Canada and therefore no press in the public sphere.

=== First printers and publishers ===
It was the first printers and publishers working during the turn of the century who began the slow and difficult work of creating a true, liberated press in Canada. These men faced many obstacles, including beatings, jailing, and the very serious and oft-carried out threat of being charged with criminal or seditious libel. As the early printing press was an essential tool of colonial administration, anyone who attempted to publish anything other than the government notices experienced hardships. There was a prohibition on publishing legislature proceedings which kept the writers out of the courts. These were colonial laws used by British authorities to manufacture loyalty, and the punishments were severe. As a result, many of these brave early printers and publishers lived in fear, massive debt, and constant persecution.

==== John Bushell (1715-1761) ====
Bushell partnered with Bartholomew Green (1690–1751) who died before their plans were realized. Bushell relocated from Boston to Halifax and opened up a printing office, and on March 23, 1752, Bushell published the first edition of the Halifax Gazette and became the colony's first "King's Printer". He was an independent entrepreneur, given no government salary, and what government administrators thought their subjects needed and what Bushell's subscribers and advertisers wanted were not necessarily the same. He was stuck in between. The government did not trust his loyalty and so made the Provincial Secretary the editor of his paper. Bushell, faced with these obstacles, struggled with debt and alcoholism which eventually led to his death.

==== Anton Heinrich (1734-1800) ====
Heinrich learned his trade in Germany but came to America as a fifer in the British Army before relocating to Halifax and anglicizing his name to the more appropriate Henry Anthony. Henry acquired Bushell's enterprise, including the Gazette. In October 1765 he printed an editorial in the Gazette that suggested that Nova Scotians were opposed to the Stamp Act which resulted in doubts about his loyalty, and he fled back to Massachusetts and the Gazette was shut down. Eventually, he made his way back into the government's good graces and was recommissioned to print the Royal Gazette.

==== William Brown (1737-1789) and Thomas Gilmore (1741-1773) ====
Originally from Philadelphia, in 1764 the two men launched the government sponsored Quebec Gazette. The paper was bilingual and was heavily censured and scrutinized by the government.

==== Fleury Mesplet (1734-1794) ====
Immigrated to Montreal from France with the intent of being a printer. However, he was jailed out of suspicion before printing anything due to his status as an American sympathizer and relationship with Benjamin Franklin. In 1778 he printed Canada's first entirely French newspaper, The Gazette (Montreal). His editor, Valentin Jautard, chose articles with a radical tone and both men were imprisoned. In 1782, Mesplet was released and allowed to go back to work for the government because he was the only capable printer, though he technically remained imprisoned.

==== Louis Roy (1771-1799) ====
On April 18, 1793, Roy launched the Upper Canada Gazette, which continued until 1849. In 1797, Roy left the paper due to political persecution after printing some incendiary opinions and fled to New York.

== Partisan period (1800-1850) ==
This is the period in which the printers and publishers began to see success in their efforts to free the press from its government control. The papers were organs of political parties and editors often played major roles in local politics. The discussion and debate surrounding the "public sphere" in the North Atlantic was actively undertaken in Upper Canada and partisan newspapers of the 1800s became "pure" inhabitants of the public sphere. Big steps were taken towards the democratization of the press, and in 1891, the right to report on political proceedings was finally won. The papers of this period were non-deferential, and demanded democratization of information. They undermined finally began to undermine the traditional hierarchical societal structure.

=== Printers and publishers ===
The development of the public sphere in Canada was closely linked with the development of a free press and there are many parallels. Most of the early publishers were - or became - very active politicians up to the mid-1800s. At this time, there was a growing market for political debate, and the independent printers of this period began using their columns for opinions, to challenge policies, expose government errors, and even promote certain candidates. These men were large personalities, unafraid to strongly voice unpopular opinions. As a result, the newspapers often became a forum for debate between the disagreeing printers.

The political issue most often debated was that of responsible government. In responsible government the executive branch is responsible to the elected legislature and no laws can be passed without the approval of said legislature. However, in Upper Canada, the appointed executive remained responsible only to the colonial governor who had to answer to Britain until 1855. Many of the publisher and printer/politicians of this time were debating this key issue.

During this period the printers were still working under very difficult conditions. Like the printers before them, many of the printers and publishers were still plagued by debt and had to work tirelessly to earn enough to support their political careers and keep the newspapers running. These men continued the difficult work of liberating the Canadian press and it is in the stories of these men that we start to see some success along with the difficulty.

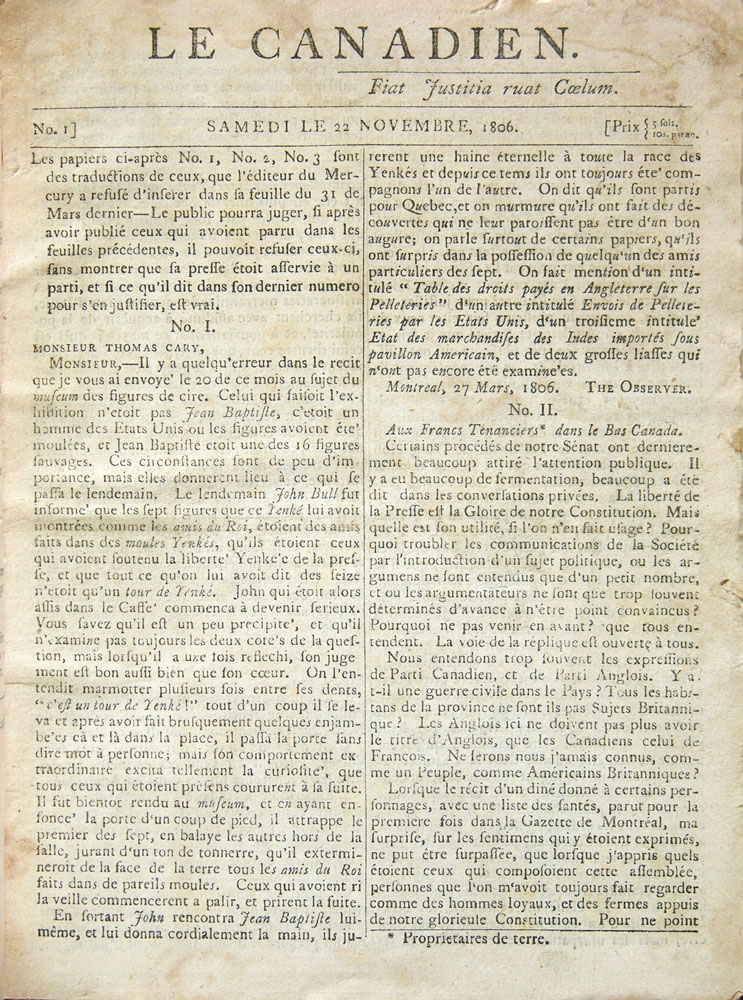
Le Canadien, November 22, 1806, vol. 1, no 1.

==== Le Canadien ====
"Le Canadien" was a French weekly newspaper published in Lower Canada from November 22, 1806 to March 14, 1810. Its motto was: "Nos institutions, notre langue et nos droits" (Our institutions, our language, our rights). It was the political mouthpiece of the Parti canadien, the voice of the liberal elite and merchants. It repeatedly editorialized for responsible government, and spoke out in a defense of the Canadiens and their traditions against the British rulers, while professing loyalty to the king. In 1810 Governor James Craig had the editor Pierre Bédard and his colleagues at the paper arrested and imprisoned without trial for the criticism they published. The paper was reestablished in the 1830s under Étienne Parent, who was imprisoned for advocating responsible government in 1839. During the rebellion era, it criticized the Durham report, opposed the union with Upper Canada, and supported the Lafontaine ministry. It was a mainstay of Liberalism until it closed at the end of the century. Not to be confused with Le Canada

==== Gideon and Sylvester Tiffany ====
These brothers started as official government printers in the 1790s, but refused to print only government sanctioned news and instead printed news from America. When they refused to heed warnings from the government, they were more formally persecuted. In April 1797, Gideon was charged with blasphemy, fired, fined, and jailed. Sylvester was then also charged with "treasonable and seditious conduct". In his defense he declared that "As the people's printer, it is my duty to devote my head, heart and hands to their service...The interests of the King and people are inseparable". Eventually the brothers were forced to give up printing, through Sylvester attempted a number of other papers before moving to New York.

==== Titus Geer Simons ====
Simmons was appointed as the new King's printer following the legal persecution of the Tiffany brothers, though he was not officially trained in printing. The Tiffany brothers remained on, and continued to determine much of the paper's content until 1799.

==== William Lyon Mackenzie ====
Mackenzie was a great influence for political development in Upper Canada (Ontario) and a fierce advocate for responsible government. In 1824, he founded the Colonial Advocate, which was the first independent paper in the province to have significant political impact. Mackenzie viewed the colonial administration as incompetent, ineffective, and expensive, and he used the Advocate to publicize these opinions. Though the paper became the most widely circulated paper, it was not profitable for Mackenzie and he struggled with debt for many years. In 1826 his printing office was broken into and destroyed by a mob. When MacKenzie sued the assailants, he won his case and collected enough in damages to repair the press and pay off his debts, as well as gain public sympathy. Mackenzie is a prime example of an editor who used his printing as a tool to take on the troubled politics of the time and open the door for the newspaper to enter the public sphere.

==== Joseph Howe ====
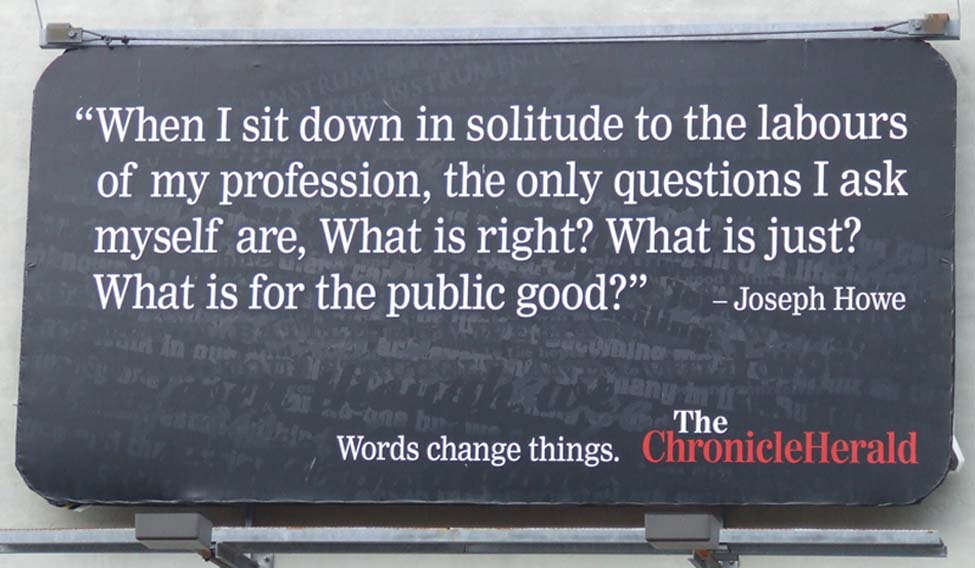
Howe's slogan displayed on the ChronicleHerald building in downtown Halifax.

In 1828, Joseph Howe took over Halifax's Weekly Chronicle, renaming it the Acadian. He then also purchased the Novascotian. His aggressive journalism made him the voice of Nova Scotia. Originally he was very loyal to the British government, But his growing trust ration shifted his loyalties to Nova Scotia. Howe, like MacKenzie, demanded home rule in the name of "responsible government".

In 1835, Howe was prosecuted for criminal libel for one of his articles. He spoke in argument for a free press at his trial and though he was technically guilty according to the law, the jury was quick to acquit. His success during his trial made him a local hero in Nova Scotia. It was this success that took Howe into the provincial parliament, and he eventually became a provincial premier.

==== Henry David Winton (1793-1855) ====
Winton arrived in Newfoundland on August 28, 1818. In 1820, he founded the Public Ledger and Newfoundland General Advisor, the fourth newspaper in St. John's. Winton used the paper to publish his own political ideas staunchly in support of responsible government. Because of his strong political sentiments he eventually became the enemy of Catholics as well as those in favor of reform - to the extent that some people wished him harm. On May 19, 1835, Winton was attacked by a group of unknown assailants and his ears were cut off. Despite this and further similar threats, Winton continued to write in opposition of the reform government until his death.

==== John Ryan (1761-1847) and William Lewis ====
Ryan was an American expatriate who, in 1807 and with the help of William Lewis, published the first issue of the Royal St. John's Gazette, the earliest newspaper in Newfoundland. Ryan soon began exposing government favoritism and unfairness in the Gazette, much to the chagrin of officials. In March 1784, both men were indicted for libel.

==== Joseph Willcocks (1773-1814) ====
In 1806, Willcocks moved to Niagara where he began publishing the Upper Canada Guardian; or Freeman's Journal which he used as a vehicle for his political opinions and criticisms. That same year, he was jailed for contempt of the house. in 1808, he rejoined politics officially and became Canada's first true leader of the Opposition against those aligned with the colonial government. He stopped printing his journal in 1812. In July 1813, he offered his services to the Americans while holding a seat in the Legislative Assembly and was formally charged with treason in 1814.

== Nation-building and myth-making period (1850-1900) ==
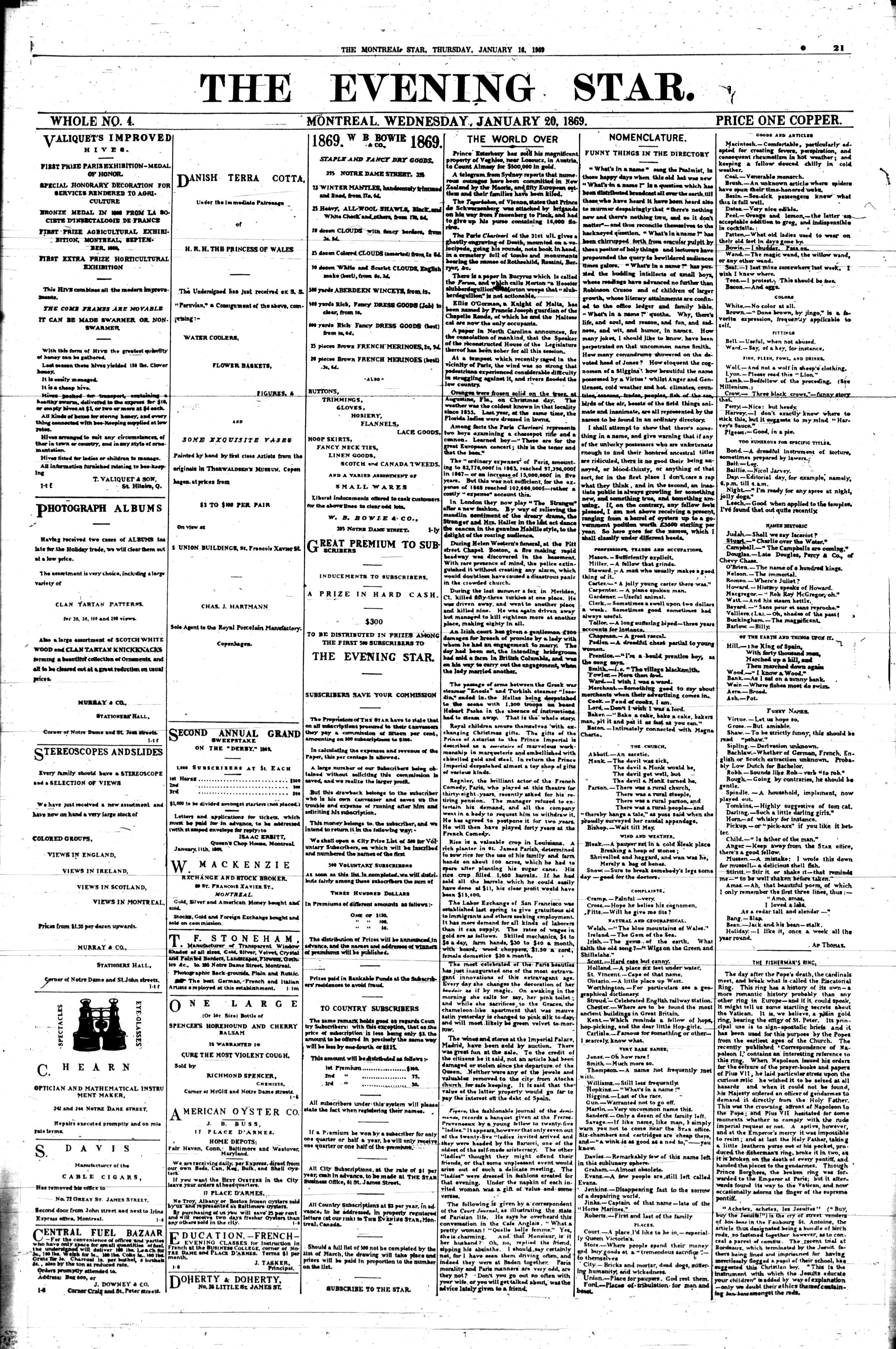
The Montreal Evening Star in 1869

Editors were now free from direct governmental control. However, the government continued to influence them in other underhanded ways, such as privately persuading editorial content and putting paid advertising only into assenting newspapers. For the most part, the radical newspapers of the Public Sphere Period had served their purposes and the papers of this period were somewhat more unbiased. More than ever, technology and progress were of great importance.

The papers of this time took on the role of establishing the Canadian identity. In publications of this period, there was a celebration of conformity and orthodoxy. Unlike the incendiary publications of the past, there was no justification seen for the rejection of order.

=== Printers and publishers ===
During this period, largely free from the government restrictions of the past, that the printers and publishers took on the role of establishing the Canadian identity. As before, many of them were personally involved in politics as well and continued to use their papers to exert their political sentiments and to push for progress and change.

==== George Brown (1818-1880) ====
George Brown (1818–1880) and his father immigrated to Toronto from Scotland in 1837; in 1843 they founded the "Banner," a Presbyterian weekly supporting Free Kirk principles and political reform. In 1844, Brown founded The Globe and Mail, a paper with strong political ambitions. Brown bought out many competitors and increased circulation using advanced technology. By 1860 it was Canada's largest newspaper. In the 1850s, Brown entered politics and became the Reform Party leader and eventually reached an agreement that led to the Confederation and the founding of the Dominion of Canada. Afterwards, he resigned from Parliament, but continued to promote his political views in the "Globe". Brown fought endless battles with the typographical union from 1843 to 1872. He paid union wages not because of generosity but only when the power of the union forced it upon him. In 1880 he was killed by an angry ex-employee.

==== Modeste Demers (1809-1871) ====
In Victoria in 1856, Bishop Modeste Demers imported a hand press intending to publish religious materials. It remained unused until 1858, when the American printer Frederick Marriott used the "Demers press" to publish four different British Columbia newspapers, the most influential of which was the British Colonist. The Demers press continued to be used for printing until 1908.

==== Amor De Cosmos (1825-1897) ====
Amor De Cosmos was the founder of the "British Colonist". He was well known for using its pages to express his political opinions. De Cosmos also eventually entered politics, assumed leadership, urged political reform and pushed for "responsible government". He was elected to represent Victoria in the House of Commons while at the same time serving as the provincial premiere of British Columbia. He was outspoken and eccentric, and made quite a few enemies throughout his life. He was accused of a scandal with the unions which eventually forced him to leave politics. When he died he had fallen into a complete breakdown.

== Modern period from 1900 to 1980s ==
=== Changing economics ===
Starting in the 1870s, new aggressive publishers included Hugh Graham at the Montreal Star, and John Ross Robertson at the Toronto Telegram, the voice of working-class Orange Protestantism. They adapted the model of the American penny press and sold cheap newspapers with a strong partisan slant and an emphasis on local news of crime, scandal, and corruption. Entertainment news became increasingly prominent, especially the comings and goings of celebrities. Sports gained increasing attention as the readers followed the ups and downs of their local teams. New features were added to attract women, including articles on fashions, grooming, and recipes. The new technology made printing cheaper and faster, and encouraged multiple editions that provided updated news throughout the day in the major cities. The Montreal Star by 1899, sold 52,600 copies a day, and by 1913 40% of its circulation was outside of Montreal. It dominated the English-language market.

In 1900, most Canadian newspapers were local affairs, designed primarily to inform local partisans about the provincial and national political scene. The publishers depended on loyal partisan subscribers, as well as contracts for public printing controlled by the political parties. Objectivity was not the goal, as the editors and reporters endeavored to reinforce the partisan attitudes on major public questions.

In the 1910s, the newspaper industry consolidated as dailies closed, chains formed, and rivals cooperated through press associations and news services. A key factor was advertising—the larger the audience the better, but partisanship reduced potential circulation to members of only one party. In the 19th century advertisers used papers that shared their political leanings. But now national advertising agencies adopted new media buying practices. They became nonpartisan and favoured papers with the highest circulation. The companies placing ads wanted to reach the maximum possible audience regardless of partisanship. The result was a series of consolidations yielding much larger, largely nonpartisan newspapers, which depended more heavily on advertising revenue than on subscriptions from loyal party members. By 1900, three-fourths of the revenue of Toronto newspapers came from advertising. About two thirds of the newspapers' editorial pages loyally supported either the Conservative or the Liberal party, while the remainder were more independent. Regardless of the editorial page, the news pages increasingly prioritized objectivity and bipartisanship. The publishers were focused on advertising revenues that were proportionate to overall circulation. A newspaper that appealed only to one party cut its potential audience in half. Simultaneously, the rapid growth of industry in Ontario and Quebec, coupled with the rapid settlement of the prairies, produced a large more affluent newspaper-reading population. The result was a golden age for Canadian newspapers peaking about 1911. Many papers failed during the war era. Advertising agencies in 1915 gained a major advantage with the arrival of the Audit Bureau of Circulations, which for the first-time provided reliable data on circulation, as opposed to the partisan boasting and exaggeration that had been the norm. the agencies now had a stronger hand in bargaining for lower advertising rates. The 1920s became a time of consolidation, budget-cutting and dropping of traditional party affiliation. By 1930 only 24% of Canada's dailies were partisan, 17% were "independent" partisan, and the majority, 50%, had become fully independent.

=== Major papers ===
==== Globe and Mail ====
In 1936, the two main papers in Toronto merged: The Globe (circulation 78,000) absorbed The Mail and Empire (circulation 118,000). The latter formed through the 1895 merger of two conservative newspapers, The Toronto Mail and Toronto Empire. The Empire was founded in 1887 by Prime Minister John A. Macdonald.

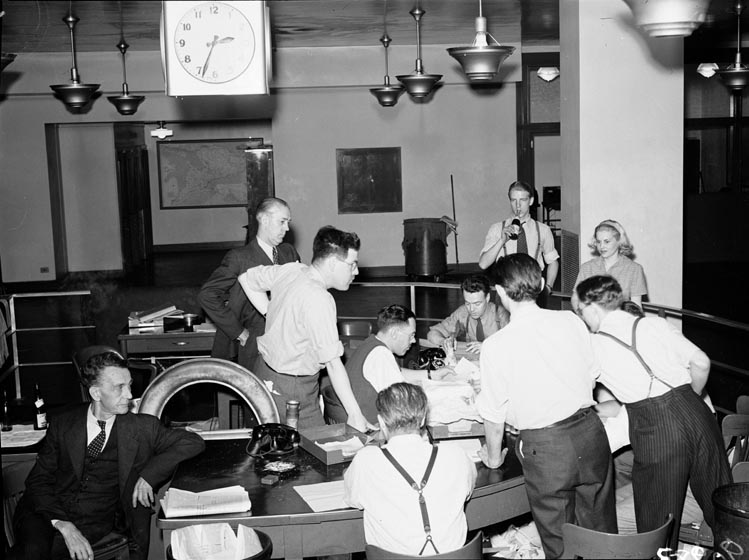
Globe and Mail staff await news of the D-Day invasion. June 6, 1944.

Although the new Globe and Mail lost ground to The Toronto Star in the local Toronto market, it began to expand its national circulation. The newspaper was unionised in 1955, under the banner of the American Newspaper Guild.

In 1980, the Globe and Mail was acquired by The Thomson Corporation, a company run by the family of Kenneth Thomson. Few changes were made in editorial or news policy. However, there was more attention paid to national and international news on the editorial, op-ed, and front pages in contrast to its previous policy of stressing Toronto and Ontario material.

=== Chains ===
Roy Thomson, 1st Baron Thomson of Fleet Thomson acquired his first newspaper in 1934 with a down payment of $200 when he purchased the local daily in Timmins, Ontario. He began an expansion of both radio stations and newspapers in various Ontario locations in partnership with fellow Canadian, Jack Kent Cooke. By the early 1950s, he owned 19 newspapers and was president of the Canadian Daily Newspaper Publishers Association.

One by one, major dailies either closed down or were bought out by nationwide chains, such as those operated by Postmedia Network (formerly Southam) or Thomson Corporation, an international conglomerate. The Government made studies but they had no impact on the trend. In 1970 the Special Senate Committee on the Mass Media, or the Davey Committee warned against consolidation. Its recommendations were ignored, and consolidation continued. Likewise the Kent Commission of 1981 was another Royal commission on newspapers whose recommendations were also ignored.

== Current history since the 1990s ==
In this era outside interests took over the chains and they became parts of large conglomerates. By 2004, the five largest chains controlled 72 percent of the papers, and 79 percent of the circulation. New competition from the Internet became a major threat to the news and advertising roles. The decline in newspaper advertising revenue was worldwide, and caused by the shift from paper media and television into Internet advertising in Canada, newspaper advertising revenue fell from a high of $2.6 billion Steadily down to $1.9 billion in 2011, with no end in sight. Circulation fell steadily as well. The newspaper chains reduced production costs cut the number of pages, and dropped traditional features, such as detailed stock market reports. They set up paywalls in order to charge for Internet access. A 2019 Report conducted by the Reuters Institute for the Study of Journalism; found out that only 9% of Canadian pays for any proportion online news in 2019.

=== The National Post ===
Conrad Black launched his national newspaper chain Hollinger International in the 1990s by purchasing the Southam Newspapers, that included the Ottawa Citizen, Montreal Gazette, Edmonton Journal, Calgary Herald, and Vancouver Sun. For a brief time Hollinger owned almost 60 per cent of Canada's daily newspapers. Black transformed a Toronto business paper into the National Post as his flagship title. The editorial tone was conservative. Black spent massively in the first few years under editor Ken Whyte in a furious battle with the Globe and Mail. Maclean's says "The National Post not only shook up Canada's media establishment, it expanded the country's political conversation, providing a diversity of opinion on a wide range of public issues. The Post has given readers 10 years of insight, humour, and most of all, choice in the market for daily news."

Black sold the National Post to CanWest Global in 2000–01. By 2006 the National Post cut back sharply on its national distribution system in an effort to cut costs and stay alive. By 2008 Globe and Mail and National Post had a combined circulation nationwide of 3.4 million.

=== CanWest ===
The emblematic network was CanWest until it collapsed in 2009. It was founded by a Manitoba tax lawyer, journalist, and politician Izzy Asper (1932-2003), who started with a local TV station in 1975 and built the nation's largest publisher of newspapers, with The National Post as its flagship. CanWest bought out the Southam chain. It owned the Global network and E! television, as well as the Alliance Atlantis group of specialty channels. At its peak in the early 21st century it owned the Canada.com Internet portal, and had television and radio interests in Australia and Turkey. CanWest went bankrupt in 2009, and the newspapers were taken over by Postmedia Network, while the broadcasting assets were sold separately to Shaw Communications.

=== Quebec newspapers ===
Quebec has always been a largely separate newspaper world. Montreal has one daily in English (The Gazette) and two in French (Le Devoir and Le Journal de Montréal). La Presse, which was Montreal's major newspaper, became 100% digital in 2018. In Québec City, there are two daily newspapers, Le Soleil and Le Journal de Québec. Outside Quebec's main cities, The Record (Sherbrooke) is English-language; five publish in French: Le Droit (Gatineau/Ottawa); Le Nouvelliste (Trois-Rivières), Le Quotidien (Saguenay), La Tribune (Sherbrooke) and La Voix de l'Est (Granby). Consolidation has meant that all but one of the French-language newspapers belong to one of two media consortia. Gesca is part of Power Corporation of Canada and controlled by the Desmarais family). The other, Quebecor Media controls most of the Quebec's television and magazine market. For a few years it was the largest chain in Canada, with 36 English language papers. Quebecor Media is a large conglomerate controlled by Pierre Karl Péladeau, who owns the controlling shares in Quebecor, that includes many community newspapers, magazines, free newspapers, and Internet services chiefly in French. It is cutting back on newspapers to concentrate on its broadcasting, cable and wireless properties. In 2013 it sold off 74 Quebec weeklies to Transcontinental Inc. for $75 million. In late 2014, Quebecor sold its 175 Sun Media English language newspapers, and many websites, to the Canadian group Postmedia Network for $316 million. Postmedia now owns all the dailies in Edmonton, Calgary and Ottawa. Gesca since 2013 has responded to the Internet challenge by expanding its free on-line services, which it supports through advertising.

== See also ==
- Canadian Newspaper Association
- History of free speech in Canada
- List of defunct newspapers of Quebec (historical)
- List of early Canadian newspapers (historical)
- List of newspapers in Canada (modern)
- List of Quebec media
- Mass media in Canada

=== Editors, publishers and personalities ===
- Izzy Asper (1932-2003), conglomerator
- John Wilson Bengough, (1851-1923) cartoonist
- Joan Fraser (b. 1944)
- Roy Thomson, 1st Baron Thomson of Fleet
- Norman Webster (b. 1941)

=== Montreal newspapers ===
- The Gazette
- La Presse
- Le Devoir
- Le Journal de Montréal

=== Toronto newspapers ===
- Toronto Star, 1899 to present
- Toronto Sun, 1971 to present
- The Globe and Mail, 1936 to present
  - The Globe, 1844-1936
  - The Mail and Empire, 1895-1936
    - The Toronto Mail, 1872-1895
    - Toronto Empire, 1872-1895
