= Unimédia =

French Canadian media group

- Company type: Public
- Incorporated: Gesca
- Founded: 1988
- Founder: Jacques Francœur
- Owner: Gesca

Unimédia was a French-Canadian media group.

== Description ==
Before being bought by the Gesca group in 2000, this groupe controlled the following dailies: Le Soleil (Quebec City), Le Quotidien (Chicoutimi), and Le Droit (Ottawa). It also owned about 30 weeklies and managed three printing plants that produced newspapers, magazines and paperbacks.

== History ==
Founded by Jacques Francœur, who sold it to another Canadian media mogul, Conrad Black, in 1988. On November 10, 2000, Gesca purchased Unimédia from Black, despite initial concerns from the Government of Quebec about a possible media monopoly. At the time, Pierre DesMarais was the chief and president of Unimédia.

Gesca currently controls seven French language newspapers in Quebec and Ontario, but has abandoned weeklies, which are currently held by Transcontinental Media.
