= Bernard Descôteaux =

Canadian journalist (1947–2024)

Bernard Descôteaux OQ ChOM
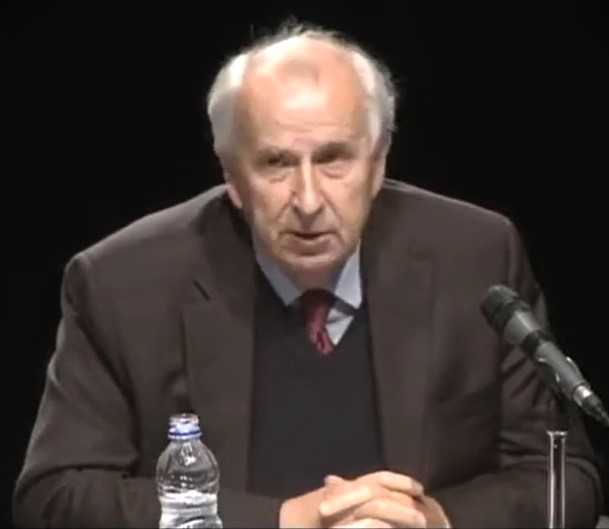
- Descôteaux speaking in 2011
- Born: 1947; Nicolet, Quebec, Canada
- Died: 13 January 2024 (aged 77)
- Occupation: Journalist
- Spouse: Marie Lavigne
- Children: 2
- Honours: Order of Quebec (2010), National Assembly medal of honour (2017), Order of Montreal

Bernard Descôteaux OQ ChOM (French: [bɛʁnaʁ dekoto]; 1947 – 13 January 2024) was a Canadian journalist. He was the editor-in-chief and director of the Montreal-based newspaper Le Devoir from 1999 through 2016. In a career spanning over four decades, he covered Montreal's municipal politics and parliamentary reporting from Ottawa and Quebec City. Descôteaux was made an officer of the National Order of Quebec in 2010 and received the National Assembly medal of honour in 2017.

== Early life ==
Bernard Descôteaux was born in Nicolet, Quebec (Note: Residents of the town pronounce the final "t" in Nicolet, however people outside of the region do not.) in 1947. He graduated with a degree in political science from the Université de Montréal and followed it with a degree in politics and economics from the University of Toronto as the Southam Foundation scholar at Massey College.

== Career ==
Descôteaux started his career in 1969 as a reporter with La Voix de l'Est, a French-language daily, before moving to the Montreal-based Le Devoir newspaper in 1974. He started with the newspaper as a parliament correspondent. He grew through the ranks and served as the newspaper's editor-in-chief and later as the managing editor and director from 1999 to 2016, succeeding Lise Bissonnette. In a career spanning over four decades, he covered Montreal's municipal politics and parliamentary reporting from Ottawa and Quebec City.

Descôteaux is credited with the economic revival of the Le Devoir newspaper. Under his leadership, the newspaper recorded profits and increased its circulation, in contrast to much of the rest of the sector. Descôteaux also developed the presence of the newspaper on the Internet. As he ended his career with the newspaper, the industry again saw declines in revenues, in particular advertising revenues. During this time he called for more governmental support for the Canadian media sector and also spoke against the large portion of the revenues going to large technology platforms.

Descôteaux was made an officer of the National Order of Quebec in 2010 and received the National Assembly medal of honour in 2017. He was also a recipient of the Order of Montreal. He served on the board of directors of the Ensemble contemporain de Montréal, a Montreal-based musical academy, the Centre d'études sur les médias, a center for media studies at the Université Laval, and Génération d'idées, a think tank.

== Personal life ==
Descôteaux was married to Marie Lavigne. The couple had two children.

Descôteaux died on 13 January 2024 at age 77. He had been diagnosed with cancer earlier.

== Books ==
- Bernard, André; Descôteaux, Bernard (1981). Québec, élections 1981 (in French). Ville LaSalle, Québec: Hurtubise HMH. ISBN 978-2-89045-500-9. OCLC 9896872.
