= Jacques Francœur =

French-Canadian businessman and journalist

- Born: 1925; Montreal, Quebec, Canada
- Died: July 24, 2005 (aged 79–80); Montreal, Quebec, Canada
- Resting place: Notre Dame des Neiges Cemetery
- Education: Sir George Williams University
- Occupations: Newspaper publisher, philanthropist
- Known for: Chairman of Unimédia
- Spouse: Catherine Francœur
- Parent: Louis Francœur

Jacques Francœur (May 15, 1925 – July 24, 2005) was a French-Canadian businessman and journalist. He is best known as the owner of the Unimédia group, making him one of Quebec's media moguls. He was the son of Louis Francœur.

== Biography ==
He had a long career in publishing, which began at the age of 16 at the daily newspaper La Patrie. He later worked for the Montreal Daily Star and The Gazette. A few years later, he purchased Le Guide du Nord, which marked the beginning of one of the most important media companies in French Canada.

He founded the Dimanche-Matin newspaper. Following that, he partnered with businessman Paul Desmarais for a number of years to establish the Trans-Canada newspaper group. Toward the end of the 1960s, he acquired the weekly newspapers Le Petit Journal, Photo-Journal, and La Patrie, which he closed in 1978. In 1973, he founded Unimédia, which would become a publishing conglomerate with a workforce of 2,000 employees and four printing plants. It featured a weekly and two dailies: Le Droit in Ottawa, Le Soleil in Québec City and Le Quotidien in Chicoutimi.

After selling Unimédia to Conrad Black in 1987, he launched one of the most prominent private foundations in Québec, Fondation Jacques Francoeur. This foundation is devoted to funding charities that provide relief for the needy, as well as organizations that promote education. Jacques Francœur also encouraged social and artistic projects for the less fortunate, while granting scholarships for Québec journalists. Furthermore, he was an influential member of many professional and community associations, being a former president of the Newspaper Association of Canada and the Daily Newspaper Association of Québec.

Francœur was also active abroad. He was an executive member of the International Press Institute in London, and from 1982 until 1990 he served on the board of directors of the American Association of Newspaper Editors. In 1995, Francœur was given an honorary degree from Concordia University.

After his death in 2005, he was entombed at the Notre Dame des Neiges Cemetery in Montreal.
