= Ottawa XPress =

Newspaper in Ottawa, Canada

- Type: Weekly
- Format: Tabloid
- Owner: Communications Voir
- Editor-in-chief: Cormac Rea
- Managing editor: Melissa Proulx
- Founded: April 1993; 33 years ago
- Ceased publication: May 17, 2012; 14 years ago
- Language: English
- Headquarters: Ottawa, Canada
- Circulation: 40,000 (2005)
- Sister newspapers: Voir; Hour
- Website: ottawaxpress.ca

The Ottawa XPress, or rendered as (x)press on its cover, was an alternative weekly newspaper in Ottawa, Ontario.

The paper was launched in April 1993 by Jim Creskey and Ross Dickson, who both also founded The Hill Times. Its original editor-in-chief was Derek Raymaker. In March 2001, the paper was sold to Voir's president and founder, Pierre Paquet. Xpress was the fifth paper to join the group, along with Montreal's Hour and the French-language cultural weeklies Voir Montréal, Voir Quebec, and Voir Gatineau, and was therefore part of the largest alternative newsweekly group in Canada. Its size changed from a 13.5-inch to a 15-inch tabloid in 2001.

As of January 2010, Cormac Rea was editor-in-chief and Melissa Proulx was managing editor. Proulx, previously Voir Gatineau's editor, was initially appointed interim editor in late November 2007.

The publication carried the syndicated Savage Love column until January 2010. The explicit content of this sex advice feature prompted the Loeb supermarket chain to discontinue distribution of the Xpress in its stores as of late 2005. Dan Savage said this action was another instance of a minority group trying to deprive a majority of people reading his column.

Communications Voir ended publication of the Ottawa XPress after its 17 May 2012 edition.

== See also ==
- List of newspapers in Canada
