= Hour Magazine =

Hour Magazine may refer to:

- Hour Community, a weekly entertainment newspaper formerly published in Montreal (now defunct)
- Hour Magazine, an American syndicated variation of the local-centric PM Magazine hosted by Gary Collins, which aired from 1980 to 1988
