= Christine Kaddous =

- Office: Director of the Centre d'études juridiques européennes

Academic background
- Education: University of Neuchâtel (BA, PhD); University of Cambridge (LLM); Université libre de Bruxelles (MA)

Academic work
- Discipline: Law
- Sub-discipline: International law, European Union law, Commercial law
- Institutions: University of Geneva
- Website: www.unige.ch/droit/ceje/en/equipe/kaddous/

Christine Kaddous is Professor of European Union law at the University of Geneva, Jean Monnet Chair ad personam and Director of the Centre d'études juridiques européennes – Centre d'excellence Jean Monnet of Geneva University. She is also Visiting Professor at the College of Europe (since 2015).

Kaddous is President of the Swiss Society for International Law (Société Suisse de droit international), Vice-President of the Swiss Association for European Law (Association suisse pour le droit européen and member of the Executive Committee of ECSA-Suisse and of the Centre européen de la culture (Geneva). She is also member of many national and international societies related to her areas of expertise, such as la Société française de droit international, the International Law Association, the European Society of International Law, the Commission pour l'Etude des Communautés européennes and the Swiss Association Arbitration.

Kaddous studied law in Switzerland (BA and PhD at the University of Neuchâtel, Switzerland), the United Kingdom (MA in Law, LL.M. (Cantab) at the University of Cambridge) and Belgium (MA in European Studies at the Université libre de Bruxelles). She was admitted to the Bar and practised as a lawyer for many years in the field of Commercial Law in Switzerland. Her teaching and research activities cover European Union law and International law, Dispute Settlement, Internal Market, EU External Relations in general with a particular interest for trade and economic law, EU-WTO relations and EU-Switzerland Bilateral Agreements. Kaddous is also editor of the "Dossiers de droit européen" collection (DDE) published by Schulthess/LGDJ (Geneva/Paris) and editorial member board of a number of international and European journals. She has published widely on international and EU law.

== Selected bibliography ==
- Services financiers: Suisse-Union européenne(avec Sylvain Matthey), Dossier de droit européen n° 31, à paraître chez Schulthess, 2016, 500 p.
- Traité sur l'Union européenne, Traité sur le fonctionnement de l'Union européenne, Charte des droits fondamentaux. Traités MES et SCG (avec Fabrice Picod), Stämpfli/LexisNexis, (Berne/Paris), 7ème édition, 2016, 374 p.
- The European Union in International Organisations and Global Governance. Recent Developments. Christine Kaddous (ed.), Hart Publishing (Oxford), 2015, 279 p.
- Traité sur l'Union européenne, Traité sur le fonctionnement de l'Union européenne, (avec Fabrice Picod), Stämpfli/LexisNexis, (Berne/Paris), 5ème édition, 2014, 375 p.
- Traité sur l'Union européenne, Traité sur le fonctionnement de l'Union européenne, (avec Fabrice Picod), Stämpfli/LexisNexis, (Berne/Paris), 4ème édition, 2013, 349 p.
- La libre circulation des personnes et des services (avec Diane Grisel), Dossier de droit européen n° 26, Helbing & Lichtenhahn (Bâle), 2012, 1036 p.
- Traité sur l'Union européenne, Traité sur le fonctionnement de l'Union européenne, tels qu'ils résultent du traité de Lisbonne(avec Fabrice Picod), Stämpfli/LexisNexis, (Berne/Paris), 3ème édition, 2012, 347 p.
- Union européenne. Recueil de textes (avec Fabrice Picod), Stämpfli/LexisNexis, (Berne/Paris), 10ème édition, 2012, 1431 p.
- European Energy Law/Droit européen de l'énergie(coéditrice avec Dirk Buschle et Simon Hirsbrunner), Dossier de droit européen n° 22, Helbing & Lichtenhahn (Bâle), 2011, 365p.
- D'Amsterdam à Lisbonne: dix ans d'espace de liberté, de sécurité et de justice, (coéditrice avec Marianne Dony), Dossier de droit européen n° 20, Helbing & Lichtenhahn/Bruylant/LGDJ (Genève/ Bâle/ Munich/ Bruxelles/ Paris), 2010, 240 p.
- Union européenne. Recueil de textes (avec Fabrice Picod), Stämpfli/LGDJ/ Bruylant, (Berne/Paris/Bruxelles), 9ème édition, 2011, 1400 p.
- Traité sur l'Union européenne, Traité sur le fonctionnement de l'Union européenne, tels qu'ils résultent du traité de Lisbonne(avec Fabrice Picod), Stämpfli/Bruylant/LGDJ (Berne/Bruxelles/Paris), 2ème édition, 2010, 330 p.
- Union européenne. Recueil de textes (avec Fabrice Picod), Stämpfli/LGDJ/ Bruylant, (Berne/Paris/Bruxelles), 8ème édition, 2010, 1371 p.
- Union européenne. Communauté européenne. Recueil de textes (avec Fabrice Picod), Stämpfli/LGDJ/Bruylant, (Berne/Paris/Bruxelles), 7ème édition, 2009, 1290 p.
- Traité sur l'Union européenne, Traité sur le fonctionnement de l'Union européenne, tels qu'ils résultent du traité de Lisbonne du 13 décembre 2007(avec Fabrice Picod), Stämpfli/Bruylant/LGDJ (Berne/Bruxelles/Paris), 2008, 323 p.
- Union européenne. Communauté européenne. Recueil de textes (avec Fabrice Picod), Stämpfli/LGDJ/Bruylant, (Berne/Paris/Bruxelles), 6ème édition, 2008, 1205 p.
- Union européenne. Communauté européenne. Recueil de textes (avec Fabrice Picod), Stämpfli/LGDJ/Bruylant, (Berne/Paris/Bruxelles), 5ème édition, 2007, 1149 p.
- Les principes fondamentaux de la Constitution européenne(avec Andreas Auer (éd.), Dossier de droit européen n° 15, Helbing & Lichtenhahn/Bruylant/LGDJ (Genève/Bâle/Munich/Bruxelles/Paris), 2006
- Accords bilatéraux II Suisse-UE et autres Accords récents (avec Monique Jametti-Greiner (éd.), Dossier de droit européen n° 16, Helbing & Lichtenhahn/Bruylant/LGDJ (Genève/Bâle/Munich/Bruxelles/Paris), 2006, 1006 p.
- Accords bilatéraux Suisse – Union européenne (Commentaires) (avec Daniel Felder (éd.), Dossier de droit européen n° 8, Helbing & Lichtenhahn/Bruylant (Bâle/Bruxelles), 2001, 783 p.
- Le droit des relations extérieures dans la jurisprudence de la Cour de justice des Communautés européennes, Dossier de droit européen n° 6, Helbing & Lichtenhahn/Bruylant (Bâle/Bruxelles), 1998, 550 p.
