= The Hill Times =

Canadian newspaper and news website

- Front page of the December 5, 2011, issue of The Hill Times
- Type: Twice weekly newspaper, daily news website
- Owner: Hill Times Publishing
- Founder(s): Jim Creskey and Ross Dickson
- Publisher: Anne Marie Creskey, Jim Creskey, Ross Dickson and Leslie Dickson
- Editor: Kate Malloy
- Managing editor: Charelle Evelyn
- Founded: 1989
- Language: English
- Headquarters: 246 Queen Street; Suite 200; Ottawa, Ontario; K1P 5E4
- Country: Canada
- Sister newspapers: The Wire Report, The Lobby Monitor, Parliament Now, Inside Ottawa, Hill Times Research Health
- ISSN: 0848-0427
- Website: www.hilltimes.com

The Hill Times is a Canadian twice-weekly newspaper and daily news website, published in Ottawa, Ontario, which covers the Parliament of Canada, the federal government, and other federal political news. Founded in 1989 by Ross Dickson and Jim Creskey, the editor is Kate Malloy.

The publication features political news items and public policy briefings, lists, surveys, feature stories, profiles, opinion columns, and analysis.

== Sister publications ==
In 1993, Hill Times Publishing launched sister title Ottawa XPress, an alternative weekly newspaper, to serve Ottawa audiences. The publication was sold to Communications Voir in 2001.

In 2004, the owners of The Hill Times also launched Embassy, a separate magazine which covered diplomatic affairs. Publication of Embassy was discontinued in 2016, with its coverage incorporated into an expanded Hill Times.
