= Dimanche-Matin =

Dimanche-Matin was a Québec Sunday newspaper published in Montreal between 1954 and 1985. For many years, it was the only Sunday newspaper published anywhere in Canada.

== History ==
The newspaper was founded in Montréal by Jacques Francœur and Robert Allard, after La Patrie and Le Petit Journal ceased publication of their Sunday editions. It first appeared on January 24, 1954. Francœur bought out Allard's interest in 1965, thus becoming the sole shareholder.

Power Corporation later had an interest in the newspaper, as well as in others owned by Francœur. Francœur bought out these interests in 1973 when Power Corporation acquired Montréal-Matin. The newspaper later became part of the Unimedia group.

The newspaper's revenue was heavily dependent on advertisements, which occupied at least half of all its pages, and sports reporting took almost half of the editorial space. Issues also included the supplements Coccinelle: journal des jeunes and Perspective-dimanche. Starting with an initial press run of 11,900, it rose to a circulation of 43,201 in 1955, and then to 287,745 by 1970, before falling to 112,000 in 1985.

The newspaper could not withstand later competition from La Presse and Le Journal de Montréal when these newspapers began publishing on Sunday in 1984, taking advantage of their already existing distribution networks. In addition, the advertising market became increasingly fractured. As a result, Dimanche-Matin ceased publication on November 19, 1985.
