= Andrée Maillet =

Canadian writer

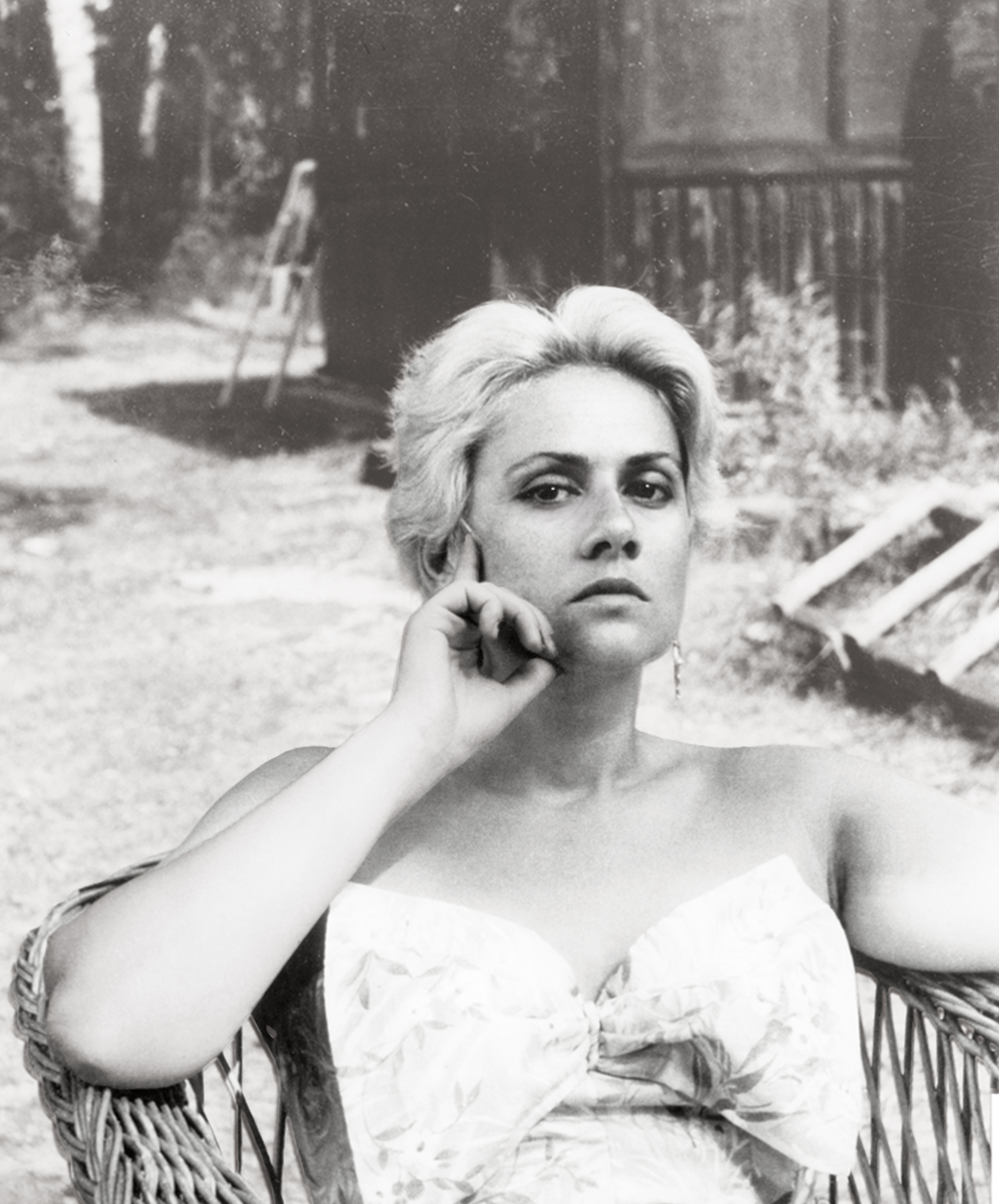

Andrée Maillet (June 7, 1921 – December 3, 1995), was a Québécois writer.

== Biography ==
The daughter of Corinne Dupuis and Roger Maillet, she was born in Montreal and began writing by the age of eleven. Maillet began a career in journalism and, from 1943 to 1952, was a correspondent in the United States and Europe. She was a member of the Anglo-American Press Association of Paris for a number of years. From 1952 to 1960, she was director of the magazine Amérique française. She wrote for Photo-Journal and was a columnist for Le Petit Journal which was owned by her father. Maillet founded the French-Canadian chapter of the PEN club. She ran as a candidate for the Rassemblement pour l'Indépendance Nationale in the Westmount provincial riding in 1966, placing fourth.

Maillet married Loyd Hamlyn Hobden. She died in Montreal at the age of 74.

== Awards and honours ==
In 1990, she received the Prix Athanase-David. Maillet was named to the Académie des lettres du Québec in 1974 and was named an officer in the Order of Canada in 1978. In 1991, she was named a Grand Officer in the National Order of Quebec.

== Selected works ==
- Les Montréalais, stories (1963)
- Le chêne des tempêtes (1965), received the first prize for literature from the Province of Québec, youth section, and the medal of the Canadian Association of Children's Librarians
- Le Chant de l'Iroquoise, poetry (1967)
- Profil de l'orignal, novel (1952)
- Les Remparts de Québec, novel (1964)
- À la mémoire d'un héros, novel (1975)
- Lettres au surhomme (two volumes) novel (1976-1977)
