= Voir =

French weekly newspaper in Quebec

- Voir magazine (October 2016)
- Type: Monthly magazine Previously a Weekly then a bi-monthly newspaper
- Owner: Communications Voir Inc.
- Founder: Pierre Paquet
- President: Pierre Paquet
- Editor-in-chief: Simon Jodoin
- Founded: 1986
- Ceased publication: 2020
- Language: French
- City: Montreal
- Country: Canada
- ISSN: 0849-5920
- Website: http://voir.ca/

Voir weekly newspaper (15 November 2012)

Voir was a francophone alternative weekly newspaper in Montreal, Quebec, published by Communications Voir. Voir was founded by Pierre Paquet in November 1986. The first issue of the newspaper was published on 27 November 1986. Later on the newspaper developed various local issues with more targeted content.

In 2013, the newspaper dropped from weekly to biweekly publication.

On April 29, 2015, it was announced that all shares owned by Paquet were purchased by a group of buyers composed of XPND Capital, a Quebec-based private equity firm, and two members of Voir's management team, Michel Fortin and Hugues Mailhot.

Starting 2016, it commenced publishing as a free monthly magazine. In February 2019, the owners Mishmash Média announced that it was discontinuing the monthly paper edition to concentrate on the digital online edition. The paper format however may be used occasionally and very selectively on certain special issues and supplements of the publication.

In 2020, Voir ceased publication.

== Chain ==
The newspaper also formerly published local editions in Quebec City, Saguenay/Alma, Estrie, Mauricie and Gatineau/Ottawa. They published a mix of locally oriented news and advertisement and listings, as well as chainwide common content published by all the editions.

Communications Voir ceased publication of these regional editions in 2012 and 2013, retaining regionally focused content only on the publication's website

== Supplements and special sections ==
- Voir carried since 2003 a weekly lifestyle supplement Voir la Vie / Voir la Ville containing amongst other restaurant reviews, travel and real estate / decoration.
- It also carried a special musical section entitled Bang Bang (earlier a separate periodical paper) but now incorporated within Voir.
- Voir also had a graphic design / typography supplement, but that section was discontinued later.

== Other publications ==
Communications Voir, the paper's publisher, also published the now-defunct anglophone alternative weeklies Hour in Montreal and XPress in Ottawa, Ontario. Both have been discontinued.

== See also ==
- List of newspapers in Canada
