= Jean-Claude Germain =

Canadian playwright and writer (1939–2025)

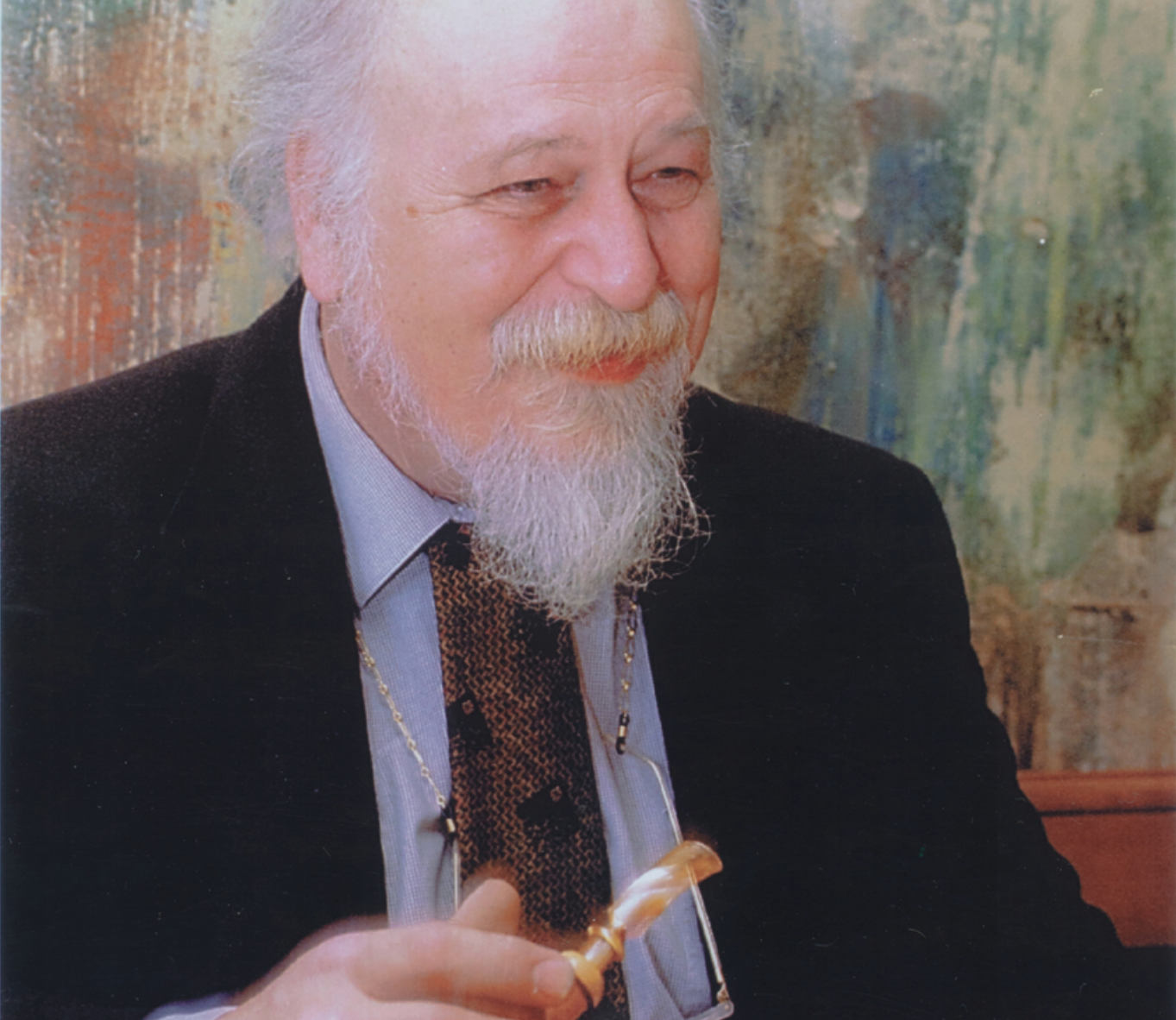
Image of Jean-Claude-Germain

Jean-Claude Germain (18 June 1939 – 24 April 2025) was a Canadian playwright, author, journalist and historian.

== Life and career ==
Germain contributed to Le Petit Journal, to Victor-Lévy Beaulieu's Dimensions magazine and to Maclean's Magazine, and was the senior editor to Le Québec littéraire. He wrote a monthly column in l'aut'journal. In 1969 he founded the company Le Théâtre du Même Nom which became the Théâtre d'Aujourd'hui of which he became the director in 1972. He also taught at the National Theatre School of Canada.

He was married to Nicole Leblanc until her death in May 2017.

Germain died on 24 April 2025, at the age of 85.

== Published works ==
- Le roi des mises à bas prix (1972)
- Diguidi, diguidi, ha! ha! ha! Si les Sansoucis s'en soucient, ces Sansoucis-ci s'en soucieront-ils? Bien parler, c'est se respecter! (1972)
- Les tourtereaux : ou, La vieillesse frappe à l'aube (1974)
- Les sportifs et le droit (1975)
- Les hauts et les bas de la vie d' une diva Sarah Ménard par aux-mêmes : une monologuerie bouffe (1976)
- Un pays dont la devise est je m'oublie : théâtre (1976)
- Les faux brillants de Félix-Gabriel Marchand : paraphrase (1977)
- Seguro dos desportistas contra os riscos de acidentes (1978)
- L'école des rêves : théâtre (1979)
- Mamours et conjugat : scènes de la vie amoureuse québécoise : théâtre (1979)
- Les nuits de l'Indiva : une mascapade (1983)
- A Canadian play/une plaie canadienne : théâtre (1983)
- Le Feuilleton de Montréal (1994)
- Le miroir aux tartuffes : un charivari québécois : théâtre (1998)
- De tous les plaisirs, lire est le plus fou (2001)
- Rue Fabre, centre de l'univers : historiettes de mon jeune âge (2007)

== Awards ==
- 2001: Order of La Pléiade
