= Échos Vedettes =

Canadian French-language celebrity magazine

- Categories: Celebrity, entertainment
- Frequency: Weekly
- Founder: Edward Rémy and André Robert
- Founded: January 26, 1963
- Company: TVA Publications
- Country: Canada
- Based in: Montreal, Quebec
- Language: French
- ISSN: 0844-1111

Échos Vedettes is a Canadian French-language weekly celebrity magazine published in Quebec. Founded in Montreal in 1963 by journalists Edward Rémy and André Robert, it covers Quebec celebrities and the province's entertainment industry, including television, music, film and live performance.

Échos Vedettes has been characterized by historians as the best-known of the Quebec publications devoted to celebrity gossip. It was one of several popular publications, including Photo-Journal, Nouvelles Illustrées and Nouvelles et Potins, that contributed to the development of a Quebec celebrity press centred on the professional and private lives of entertainers.

== History ==
=== Founding ===
Échos Vedettes was founded by journalists Edward Rémy and André Robert. Its first issue appeared on January 26, 1963. Rémy, who had been born in Paris in 1926, came to Quebec in the late 1950s and worked as a photographer covering entertainers before establishing the magazine with Robert.

The first issue, priced at ten cents, featured singer Michel Louvain and actor Émile Genest in Hollywood. The magazine concentrated on the activities and private lives of Quebec entertainers. Rémy attended premieres, launches and other entertainment-industry events and developed a reputation for closely following the lives of performers.

The publication promoted the slogan Quand c'est dans Échos Vedettes, c'est vrai ("When it's in Échos Vedettes, it's true"). It also included television listings without increasing the cover price. By 1968, circulation had reached 109,965 copies.

Academic research into Quebec's popular music press has described Échos Vedettes as particularly significant because of its circulation, longevity and representative character. The magazine was identified as the best-known of Quebec's celebrity-gossip publications, which reported on records and performances as well as the professional and personal lives of singers and other entertainers.

=== Quebecor ownership ===
Rémy and Robert sold Échos Vedettes to publisher Pierre Péladeau during the 1970s. Péladeau had established a competing celebrity publication, Photo-Vedettes, in 1963. Échos Vedettes subsequently became part of the publishing interests that developed into Quebecor.

Under Quebecor, the magazine became part of TVA Publications. Along with 7 Jours, La Semaine and TV Hebdo, Quebecor has described Échos Vedettes as one of its principal entertainment weeklies covering Quebec's cultural and entertainment industries.

=== Later development ===
In 2007, Échos Vedettes introduced a new visual design and broadened its editorial content. In addition to celebrity news, it added material on books and food and expanded its coverage of emerging performers, films, home video, music and live performances.

The magazine marked its 50th anniversary beginning in September 2012. Anniversary material included a reproduction of the first issue, originally published on January 26, 1963, featuring Michel Louvain and Émile Genest. Celebrations continued in 2013 with commemorative publications and a photographic exhibition at Place des Arts in Montreal.

Co-founder André Robert died in 2001. Rémy died in 2021 at the age of 94. At the time of Rémy's death, Quebecor described him as an important figure in Quebec entertainment journalism and noted that the publication remained in operation almost six decades after its founding.

== Content ==
Échos Vedettes primarily reports on Quebec entertainers and celebrities. Its coverage includes celebrity news and interviews as well as television, music, film and live entertainment. The magazine also contains television listings and cultural columns.

Quebecor has described the magazine as one of the entertainment weeklies that support Quebec's "star system" through coverage and promotion of the province's entertainment industry.

The magazine continued to be published weekly by TVA Publications in 2026. Issues at that time were approximately 68 pages and were distributed in both print and digital formats.

== Legacy ==
Échos Vedettes is among the longest-running publications devoted to Quebec's entertainment industry. Scholarship on Quebec popular culture has used the magazine as a source for studying the development of the province's popular music and celebrity culture.

Its development formed part of the emergence of a distinct Quebec celebrity press during the mid-20th century. Publications such as Échos Vedettes, Photo-Journal, Nouvelles Illustrées and Nouvelles et Potins combined entertainment reporting with coverage of the personal lives of performers, helping to create and sustain a local celebrity culture.

== See also ==
- Celebrity journalism
- Culture of Quebec
- Photo-Journal
