= La Voix de l'Est (Granby) =

French language daily in Granby, Quebec

The Record
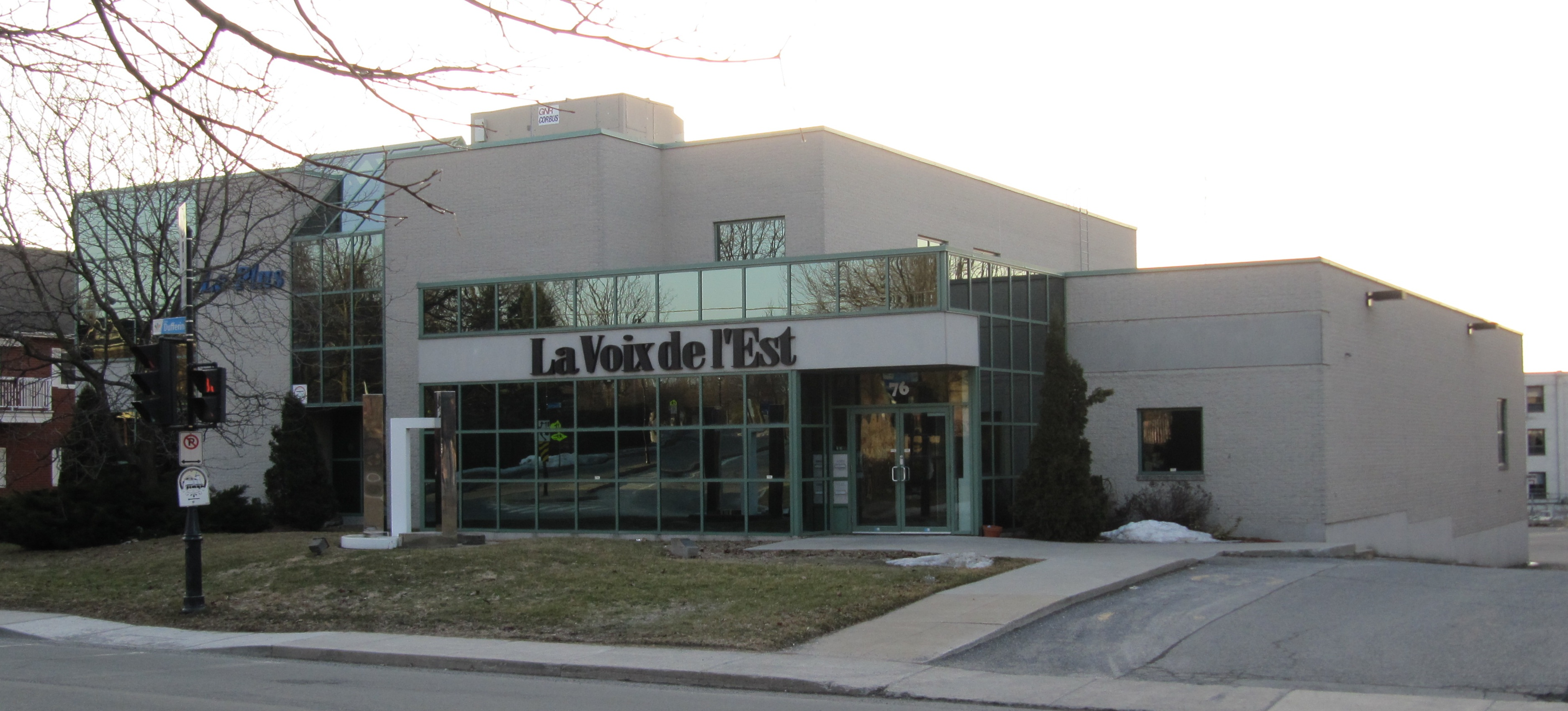
- Offices of La Voix de l'Est in Granby, Quebec
- Type: Daily newspaper
- Owner: Groupe Capitales Médias
- Founded: 1935
- Headquarters: 76, rue Dufferin, Granby, Québec, J2G 9L4
- Country: Canada
- ISSN: 1493-2350
- Website: www.lavoixdelest.ca

La Voix de l'Est is a French-language daily newspaper published in Granby, Quebec. It is printed on the presses of the neighbouring daily La Tribune in Sherbrooke, Quebec. A weekly version of the newspaper is offered as a free supplement once a week on Wednesdays with the publication Le Plus.

The newspaper was founded by Imprimerie Rapide and the first issue was published on 20 June 1935. It became a daily publication on 24 February 1945. On 7 September 1945, Imprimerie Rapide changed its name to La Voix de l'Est Ltée. In 1968, the paper was sold to Journaux Trans-Canada (an affiliate of Power Corporation of Canada). In 1977, it was sold to La Tribune in Sherbrooke.

In March 2015, Gesca sold the paper, along with five others, to Groupe Capitales Médias (owned by Martin Cauchon).
