= Gérard Filion =

Canadian businessman and journalist

- Born: August 18, 1909; L'Isle-Verte, Quebec
- Died: March 26, 2005 (aged 95)
- Occupation(s): Businessman and journalist
- Spouse: Françoise Servêtre

Gérard Filion, CC GOQ MSRC (August 18, 1909 – March 26, 2005) was a Canadian businessman and journalist.

== History ==
Born in L'Isle-Verte, Quebec, the youngest of 17 children, he received a Bachelor of Arts from Université Laval in 1931 and a diploma in 1934 from École des Hautes Études Commerciales de Montréal. From 1935 until 1947 he worked for the l'Union catholique des cultivateurs, a group representing farmers. From 1947 until 1963 he was the publisher of Le Devoir, a French-language newspaper published in Montreal. He was one of the most vocal critics of Maurice Duplessis's government.

He was Mayor of Saint-Bruno-de-Montarville from 1960-1968. In 1970 he was made a Companion of the Order of Canada. In 1989 he was made a Grand Officer of the National Order of Quebec. He was married to Françoise Servêtre and had nine children.

Filion’s journalism career began when he was 26. Working for the Terre de Chez Nous, a paper run by the Catholic Union of Farmers, Filion became a lifelong ally of many Quebec unions.

In 1947 he began publishing Le Devoir and used the paper to rise to the unions’ defence against Maurice Duplessis, the province’s Premier. Duplessis was the leader of Quebec’s conservative Union Nationale government and Filion became one of his fiercest opponents. Decades later, Filion credited Duplessis as being a boon to his career. Without having the Premier as an opponent, Filion doubted he ever would have published such excellent work during his time with Le Devoir.

After Duplessis’ death in 1959, Filion continued pushing to modernize Quebec. A member of many Crown commissions, he worked with the group that took control of French-Canadian schools away from the Catholic Church. Because of this work, he is considered a key player in Quebec’s Quiet Revolution.

In 1970, he became a Companion of the Order of Canada.

Filion died in 2005. He was inducted into the Canadian News Hall of Fame in 1966.
