= Le Délit français =

University newspaper in Quebec, Canada

Le Délit
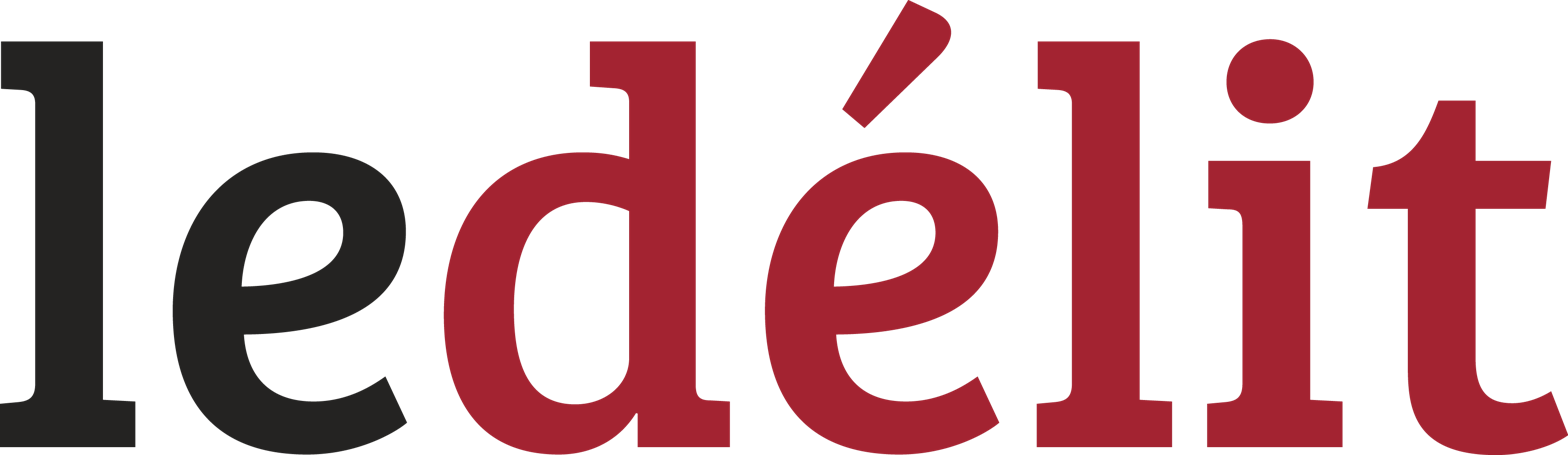
- Type: Student newspaper
- Format: Tabloid
- School: McGill University
- Owner: Daily Publications Society
- Publisher: Daily Publications Society
- Founded: 1977
- Language: French
- Headquarters: 3480, rue McTavish; Suite B-24; Montreal, Quebec; H3A 1X9
- Circulation: 5,000(distributed every Tuesday)
- Sister newspapers: The McGill Daily
- ISSN: 1192-4608
- Website: delitfrancais.com

Le Délit, also known as Le Délit français, is the only independent francophone newspaper on the McGill University campus, in Montreal, Quebec, Canada. Serving McGill University's francophone-student minority, Le Délit is a sister publication to the English-language The McGill Daily.

Evolving from the Le McGill Daily français, French-language section in The McGill Daily, Le Délit became a standalone newspaper on September 1, 1977. Initially retaining the name Le McGill Daily français, the publication changed its moniker to the edgier-sounding Le Délit, a play on words; while it sounds like "Le Daily" in English, in French, Le Délit actually means the offense or the misdemeanor.

Le Délit is a founder and former member of Canadian University Press and founder of the Carrefour international de la presse universitaire francophone (CIPUF).

== Masthead ==
Le Délit is published by The Daily Publications Society (DPS) every Wednesday during the University's Fall and Winter terms. The paper has five main sections in addition to the weekly editorial page: Actualités, Société with sub-section Opinion and Enquête, Culture and Environnement. Current-affairs features overlap between the Actualités and Société pages.

== Prizes ==
In 2016, Le Délit was named "best student journal", receiving the Le Devoir de la presse étudiante prize for its publications throughout 2015 – 2016, ex aequo with l'Artichaut from UQAM. This prize, bestowed by "Les Amis du Devoir" – an organization attached to the daily newspaper Le Devoir — is a journalism contest destined for students at pre-university (CEGEP) and university level.

== See also ==
- The McGill Daily
- List of student newspapers in Canada
- List of newspapers in Canada
