= Le Droit =

French-language newspaper in Canada

- Type: Daily newspaper
- Format: Tabloid
- Owner: Coopérative nationale de l'information indépendante
- Editor: Marie-Claude Lortie
- Founded: March 27, 1913
- Language: French
- Headquarters: 425, boulevard Saint-Joseph; Bureau 201; Gatineau, Quebec; J8Y 3Z8
- Country: Canada
- Circulation: 35,829 weekdays; 35,810 weekend days; (as of 2011)
- ISSN: 0839-4865
- Website: ledroit.com

Le Droit is a Canadian French-language digital weekly newspaper, published in Gatineau, Quebec. Initially established and owned by the Missionary Oblates of Mary Immaculate, the paper was published by Martin Cauchon and his company, Capitales Médias, from 2015 to 2019, when a cooperative was formed by the employees to continue publishing the paper.

Formerly published in Ottawa, Ontario, for much of its history, it was the only francophone daily newspaper published in Ontario for the Franco-Ontarian community. Amid the context of the media profitability crunch of the late 2010s, it closed its Ottawa offices in 2019, moving across the river to Gatineau in order to qualify for special tax credits being offered by the government of Quebec to preserve endangered media outlets, although the newspaper reiterated that it would continue to cover Ottawa-related news.

The newspaper switched from daily to weekly publication in 2020, and dropped print issues to become digital-only at the end of 2023.

== History ==
The newspaper was launched on March 27, 1913, as a tool to condemn Regulation 17, an Ontario law that restricted education in French at that time. Today, it continues to defend francophone rights in Ontario.It is still involved in the protection of francophone rights in Ontario, notably advocating for the survival of the Montfort Hospital during the government of Ontario premier Mike Harris.

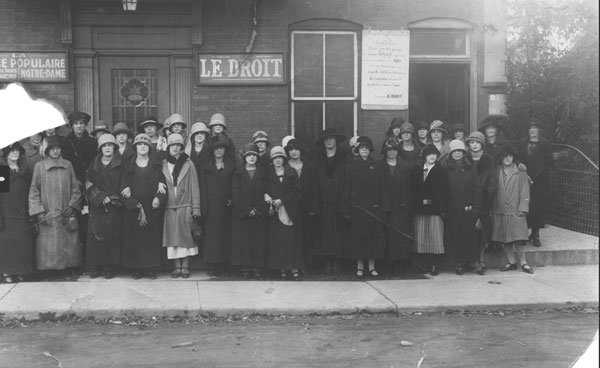
Match-workers on strike in 1924, seen in front of the offices of Le Droit.

In the 1960s, Le Droit tried to extend its market into Northeastern Ontario, including the North Bay, Timmins and Sudbury areas, all of which have large francophone populations. However, it quickly abandoned the project due to high costs. Originally published as a broadsheet, it switched to tabloid format in 1988, following an 11-week strike by the pressmen. The newspaper also had a previous strike in 1982.

In 2001, Gesca, a subsidiary of Power Corporation owned by Franco-Ontarian Paul Desmarais acquired the paper from Conrad Black's Hollinger, who owned it between 1987 and 2001. In the eighties, it belonged to Montreal-based Jacques Francoeur, the founder of Sunday weekly Dimanche-Matin, who built the Unimedia chain which included Le Soleil (Quebec City) and Le Quotidien (Chicoutimi, now Saguenay). He acquired Le Droit from the Oblates.

In 2015, Gesca sold six of its francophone titles, including Le Droit, to Martin Cauchon, a former minister in the Jean Chrétien government. Terms were not disclosed.

In 2020, the paper switched from printing six times a week to once a week on Saturdays. Three years later the last print edition of the newspaper was published on December 30, 2023. Moving forward the publication will be entirely digital.

The publisher since 2007 is Jacques Pronovost. Before him, it was led by Claude Gagnon (2002 – 2007), Pierre Bergeron (1993 – 2002), Gilbert Lacasse (1987 – 1993) and Jean-Robert Bélanger (c. 1953 – 1987). Managing editors have included Jean Gagnon (?), André Larocque (2006 – 2010), Michel Gauthier (2001 – 2006), François Roy (1994 – 2001), Claude Beauregard (1994), Gilbert Lavoie (1991 – 1994), and André Préfontaine (1989 – 1991).

== Today ==
It is also read by the Franco-Ontarian community and was the fourth all-time francophone newspaper (the previous three existed in the 19th century). Its articles can also be read on the internet in the Cyberpresse network, which also includes La Presse in Montreal, Le Soleil in Quebec City, Le Nouvelliste in Trois-Rivières, La Tribune in Sherbrooke, La Voix de l'Est in Granby and Le Quotidien in Saguenay.

Its main offices were located near the ByWard Market, with a second office located at Les Promenades Gatineau in Gatineau, until the move to Gatineau. It currently has about 150 employees.

== Controversy ==
In 2008, Sudbury's francophone community newspaper Le Voyageur published an editorial criticizing the Canadian Radio-television and Telecommunications Commission for its handling of Le5 Communications' application to acquire two francophone radio stations, CHYC-FM in Sudbury and CHYK-FM in Timmins. The paper took issue with the fact that the CRTC's original notice of hearing was published only in Le Droit, and not in any of the region's local media—thereby giving the francophone community in Northeastern Ontario little notice of either the pending transaction or the deadlines for reviewing and submitting comments regarding the application.

== Notable staff ==
- Marcel Desjardins, political correspondent and sports journalist
- Pierre Dufault, political correspondent and sports journalist
- François Gagnon, ice hockey journalist covering the Ottawa Senators
