= Lise Bissonnette =

Canadian writer and journalist

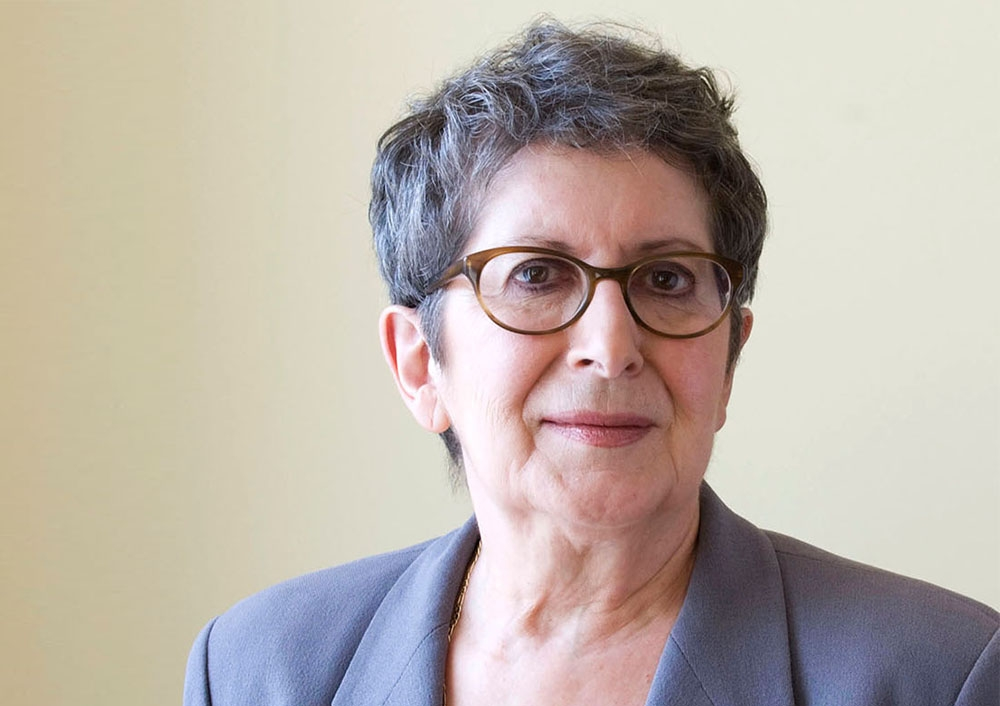
Lise Bissonnette in 2021

Lise Bissonnette OC OQ (born December 13, 1945) is a Canadian writer and journalist.

== Biography ==
Born in Rouyn, Quebec, Bissonnette studied education science at the Université de Montréal from 1965 to 1970. She later pursued doctoral studies at the University of Strasbourg and the École pratique des hautes études in Paris. In 1974, she became a reporter for the daily newspaper Le Devoir. She became the parliamentary correspondent in Quebec City, then in Ottawa, before taking on the position of editorialist and, finally, that of writer-in-chief in 1982. From 1986 to 1990, she worked as an independent journalist and consultant, and collaborated with many Quebec and Canadian media organizations. She writes a weekly article on Quebec affairs for the Canadian daily newspaper The Globe and Mail, as well as monthly articles for the magazines L'actualité and Montreal Magazine. In 1990, she returned to Le Devoir, where she served as editor-in-chief until 1998. Bissonnette appears regularly as an analyst on both French and English news programs on public and private radio and television networks.

She has also published two novels, Marie suivait l'été (1992) and Affaires d'art (1996), and a short story collection, Quittes et doubles (1997).

She holds seven doctorates honoris causa: from the Université de Sherbrooke, State University of New York, Concordia University, Laurentian University, Université Laval, Université de Montréal, and the University of Ottawa.

Bissonnette was the president and general director of the Bibliothèque et Archives nationales du Québec, formerly known as the Bibliothèque nationale du Québec. She was appointed to this position in 1998, and left the post after 11 years of service.

She is a member of the Union of Quebec Writers.

== Awards and honours ==
She was shortlisted for the Governor General's Award for French-language non-fiction at the 1987 Governor General's Awards for her essay collection La passion du présent, and for the Governor General's Award for French-language fiction at the 1992 Governor General's Awards for Marie suivait l'été and at the 1997 Governor General's Awards for Quittes et doubles.

Bissonnette received the Order of Francophones of America in 1993. She was elected member of the Academy of Letters and the Social sciences of the Royal Society of Canada in 1994. In 1998, she was made an Officer of the National Order of Quebec. In 2000, she was awarded the French Légion d'honneur, and received the new mérite d'honneur of French and of Francophone education, bestowed by the Quebec Minister of International Relations, Louise Beaudoin.
