= Le Nouvelliste (Quebec) =

Canadian newspaper in Trois-Rivières, Quebec

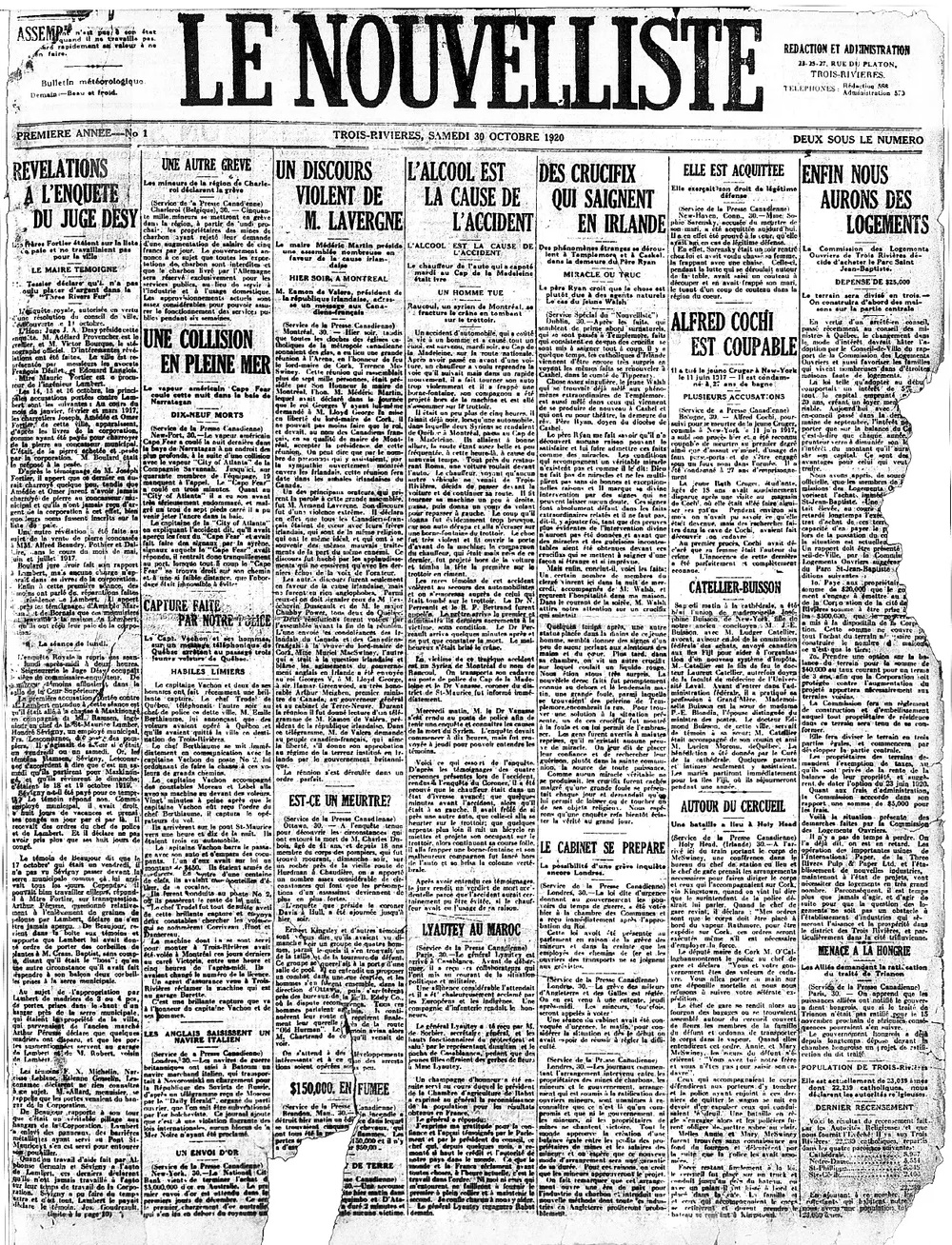
- Type: Daily newspaper
- Owner: Gesca Limitée (Power Corporation)
- Headquarters: 1920, rue Bellefeuille; Trois-Rivières, Quebec; G9A 3Y2
- Country: Canada
- Circulation: 42,978 weekdays 45,783 Saturdays in 2011
- ISSN: 0832-0934
- Website: lenouvelliste.ca/

Le Nouvelliste (French pronunciation: [lə nuvɛlist]) is the Mauricie regional newspaper, based in Trois-Rivières, Quebec.

The newspaper was established 30 October 1920 by Joseph-Hermann Fortier. In 1935, the paper was acquired by Jacob Nicol; 16 years later, in 1951, the paper changed ownership again, with Honoré Dansereau acquiring the paper. Alongside several other French Canadian papers, Le Nouvelliste was bought in 1968 by Paul Desmarais.

It was part of the Gesca media conglomerate, until it was sold to Groupe Capitales Medias in 2015. It ceased its print edition in 2023, but continues as an online newspaper.

== See also ==
- List of Quebec media
