= Le Soleil =

Le Soleil ("The Sun") may refer to:

== Newspapers ==
- Le Soleil (Quebec), a French-language daily newspaper in Quebec City, Quebec, Canada, founded in 1896
- Le Soleil (French newspaper), a defunct daily newspaper based in Paris from 1873 to 1915
- Le Soleil (Senegal), a daily newspaper published in Dakar, Senegal, founded in 1970
- Le Soleil de la Floride, a newspaper in Florida for Francophones and tourists

== Other uses ==
- Le Soleil (restaurant), New York City
