= The McGill Daily =

Student newspaper in Quebec, Canada

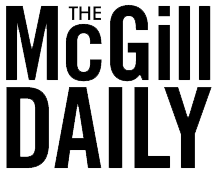
- Type: Student newspaper
- Format: Compact
- Owner: Daily Publications Society
- Publisher: Daily Publications Society
- Founded: 1911
- Language: English
- Headquarters: 3480, rue McTavish; Room 107; Montreal, Quebec; H3A 0B8
- Circulation: 6,000 (per issue)
- Sister newspapers: Le Délit français
- ISSN: 1192-4608
- Website: mcgilldaily.com

The McGill Daily is an independent student newspaper at McGill University and is entirely run by students. Despite its name, the Daily has reduced its print publication to once a week, normally on Mondays, in addition to producing online-only content and weekly radio segments for CKUT 90.3 FM.

The Daily was originally published daily in 1911. It began as a sports rag in the broadsheet format and has since transitioned to the compact or tabloid format, covering a wide range of issues related to the McGill and greater Montreal communities. The paper's content sections are News, Commentary, Culture, Features, Sci+Tech, Unfit to Print (radio), and Compendium!.

== History ==
The Daily is one of Canada's oldest university publications, continually publishing since the early 1900s. At one time, the paper was even "the oldest daily student newspaper in the Commonwealth".

The Daily has been the training ground for generations of journalists since its inception in 1911. Currently the Daily is one of the largest student newspapers in Canada and is widely read both on the McGill campus and around Montreal. The Daily began as a broadsheet that focused mainly on sports news. Its evolution has taken many directions. Over the years, it has taken stands considered controversial at their times, such as publishing a special issue for International Women's Day in the late 1970.

The Daily has been independent from student government since 1980. It is published by the Daily Publications Society, an autonomous body whose membership includes all McGill downtown campus undergraduate students except Continuing Education, as well as all graduate students excluding non-residents, graduate medical and graduate dentistry students.

In 2010, the Daily Publications Society proposed raising the mandatory fee from $5 to $6 per semester due to declining ad revenues. A "No Committee" formed by students challenged the fee increase, saying that the money could be better spent on underfunded programs. With a high voter turnout, the referendum passed by 2.6%.

== Editorial staff ==
The McGill Daily is run in a non-hierarchical manner when compared to other publications. Editors and staff members have equal voting powers and speaking privileges at editorial board meetings. Each editor is paid a monthly stipend. When the paper was twice-weekly, the amount of the stipend was determined by the frequency of each section's appearance, with editors of sections appearing once weekly receiving half of the amount received by editors of sections appearing twice weekly. With a reduction in frequency of print publication, the allocation of stipends once reflected amount of content published, with previously twice-weekly sections publishing more online-only content, and continuing to receive twice the amount of "half" sections. However, as of November 2019, all editors receive equal stipends.

== Past contributors ==
Some of the Daily's notable past contributors include:

- Leonard Cohen, poet and songwriter
- Irwin Cotler, international human rights lawyer and Member of Parliament for the Liberal Party
- Adam Gopnik, The New Yorker
- Charles Krauthammer, The Washington Post and TIME columnist
- Irving Layton, poet
- David Lewis, Rhodes Scholar, mentor to Irving Layton, and leader of the federal New Democratic Party (1971–1975)
- Albert Nerenberg, filmmaker and columnist
- A. J. M. Smith, poet and critic
- Mark Starowicz, CBC radio and TV news editor, documentary producer
- Brian Topp, candidate for leadership of the NDP, former Senior News Editor, 1982
- Lauren Liu, Member of Parliament for the New Democratic Party
- Pj Vogt, host of the podcast Reply All

== See also ==
- The Tribune (McGill)
- Le Délit français
- List of student newspapers in Canada
- List of newspapers in Canada
