= Unimedia =

Moldovan news site

- Website type: News site
- Founded: 2007
- Owner: Miraza Srl
- Founders: Tudor Darie; Dumitru Ciorici; Vasile Galușca; Sergiu Gălușca
- Website: www.unimedia.info
- Commercial: yes

Unimedia is a Moldovan news site. It was founded in 2007 by Tudor Darie, Dumitru Ciorici, Vasile Galușca and Sergiu Gălușca. As of March 2013, they claim to have 120,500 daily visits and 500,000 daily page views. On 30 June 2009, Radio Free Europe described it as "a largely pro-opposition media outlet", the Moldovan opposition back then being composed by the parties opposed to the Party of Communists of the Republic of Moldova and to Vladimir Voronin.

Unimedia was integrated to New Media Group in January 2008. After, in January 2010, Unimedia was transferred to Interact Media.

== Political pressure ==
In April 2008, Unimedia was summoned to surrender the IP addresses of commentators to the authorities. Unimedia refused, arguing that IP addresses were only stored for a period of 10 days. June 2008 saw reports of NGO protests against what was called the unjustified seizure of computer equipment. In the run-up to July 2009 elections, it was reported that Unimedia and its parent company had been issued warnings by Moldovan authorities regarding visitor messages that were alleged to be a "call to violence and mass disorder, a call to removal and change of the constitutional system," as reported by Oliver Vujović of the South East Europe Media Organisation in the Bulgarian newspaper The Sofia Echo.
