= Martin Cauchon =

Canadian politician

The Honourable Martin Cauchon PC
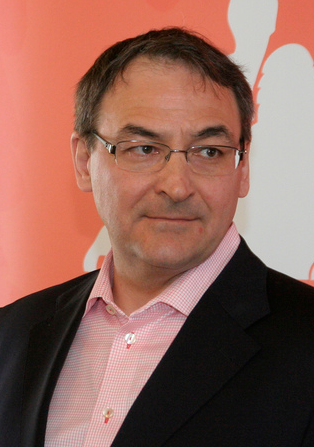

Member of Parliament for Outremont
- In office 25 October 1993 – 28 June 2004
- Preceded by: Jean-Pierre Hogue
- Succeeded by: Jean Lapierre

Minister of Justice Attorney General of Canada
- In office 15 January 2002 – 11 December 2003
- Prime Minister: Jean Chrétien
- Preceded by: Anne McLellan
- Succeeded by: Irwin Cotler

Personal details
- Born: 23 August 1962 (age 64) La Malbaie, Quebec, Canada
- Party: Liberal
- Profession: Lawyer

Martin Cauchon PC (born 23 August 1962) is a Canadian lawyer and politician in Quebec Canada. He served as a Liberal Cabinet minister in the government of Jean Chrétien. He unsuccessfully ran for the leadership of the Liberal Party of Canada in 2013, losing to Justin Trudeau.

Cauchon worked as a lawyer from 1985 to 1993, and from 2004 to present. Today, he is counsel at the Montreal office of DS Lawyers Canada LLP, an international law firm. He is also a Vice-Chairman of the Canada China Business Council.

== Early life and career ==
Cauchon was born in La Malbaie, Quebec and studied law at the University of Ottawa and the University of Exeter in the United Kingdom. He practised law in civil and commercial litigation from 1985 to 1993. Cauchon was counsel with Gowlings and with the now-defunct law firm of Heenan Blaikie.

He is married to Dorine Perron and, together, they have three children.

== Politics ==
Cauchon first ran for public office in the 1988 federal election when he challenged Prime Minister Brian Mulroney in the riding of Charlevoix, however he was unsuccessful in this bid. In the 1993 federal election, Cauchon once again sought a seat in the House of Commons of Canada. In this election, he was elected in the Montreal riding of Outremont. He was re-elected in the 1997 and 2000 elections.

Cauchon was appointed Secretary of State for the Federal Office of Regional Development - Quebec by Prime Minister Jean Chrétien in 1996. He became a full cabinet minister in 1999 when he was given the position of Minister of National Revenue. On 15 January 2002, he became Minister of Justice and Attorney General of Canada, and Quebec lieutenant. As justice minister, Cauchon argued in cabinet in favour of same-sex marriage and the decriminalization of marijuana (indeed, when asked whether he had used marijuana in the past, he responded "Yes, of course"). As a minister, Cauchon leave its marks on many files. As Secretary of State for regional development, he solidified the community future organisation in the province of Quebec. During his tenue as minister of national revenue, he introduced the customs action plan opening the door for the use of more technologies in managing the Canada-US border. As Minister of Justice, he fought for equality right and tabled the bill on same-sex marriage. He also introduced a bill decriminalizing marijuana. Even though that latter bill wasn't pass into law, it was the precursor of the legalization of marijuana.

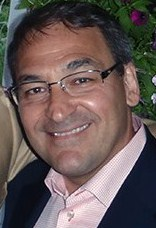
Cauchon during 2010.

In 2009, Cauchon indicated he was interested in re-entering politics and running in his former riding of Outremont, which was then held by New Democratic Party (NDP) Deputy Leader Thomas Mulcair. The Liberal Party's Quebec Lieutenant Denis Coderre, who was tasked with finding Quebec candidates for the next election, announced that the riding was closed off to Cauchon and was being reserved for a female candidate. Liberal leader Michael Ignatieff originally sided with Coderre in opposing Cauchon return, and instead planned to appoint prominent businesswoman Nathalie le Prohon as the candidate in the riding. However, after facing pressure from within his caucus Ignatieff reversed his earlier decision and decide to allow Cauchon to seek the nomination, after Le Prohon indicated she would seek the Liberal nomination in Jeanne-Le Ber. The controversy over the nomination led to Coderre's resignation as the Liberal's Quebec Lieutenant and Defence Critic, saying he no longer had the "moral authority" to continue.

In the federal election held on 2 May 2011, Cauchon was unsuccessful in his bid to unseat Mulcair. The NDP's support in Quebec, and throughout most of Canada, had surged in the final weeks of the campaign, at the expense of the Liberals and Bloc Québécois. The NDP won 59 seats in Quebec and replaced the Liberals as the Official Opposition in the House of Commons. Ignatieff had also failed in his bid to win re-election and resigned as party leader days later.

=== Leadership ===
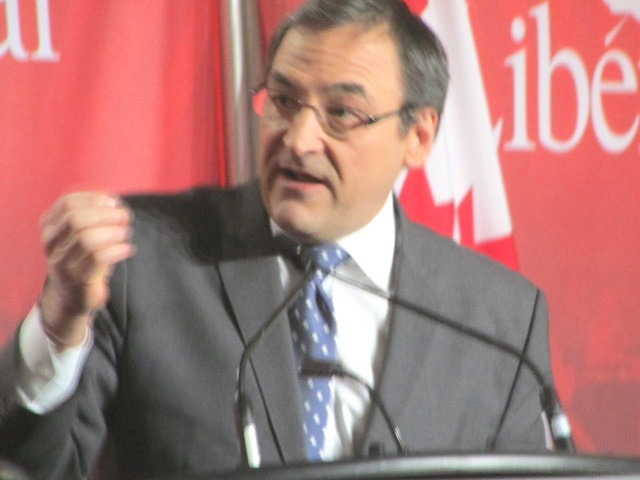
Cauchon during a Liberal Party candidates debate on 16 February 2013

Cauchon was a Chrétien loyalist and opposed Paul Martin's attempt to force Chrétien to retire. When Chrétien announced his resignation, Cauchon was touted as a possible candidate to succeed him but did not end up running in the 2003 leadership election. Cauchon refused to back Martin's leadership bid, and decided to support John Manley. Martin was elected leader and did not include Cauchon in his cabinet. Following this he announced he would not seek re-election in the 2004 federal election.

Cauchon was considered a potential candidate in both the 2006 and 2009 Liberal leadership elections, however in both cases he announced he would not run. In 2006, he endorsed former Ontario Premier Bob Rae who placed third.

At the Liberal Party's 2012 biennial convention, Cauchon hosted a hospitality suite leading to speculation that he was interested in running for leader in the 2013 leadership election. In December 2012, it was reported that Cauchon was planning a lately entry into the race after some Liberals feared the top tier of contenders were supporting right-wing policies. On the last weekend before the registration cutoff on 14 January 2013, Cauchon was trying to gather the 300 signatures needed to enter the leadership race. Fellow leadership contender David Bertschi sent out an email to Liberals asking for their help to get enough signatures so that Cauchon could enter the contest. On 14 April 2013, he lost the leadership election to Montreal MP Justin Trudeau.

== Legal-post political career ==
Following his exit from politics, Cauchon returned to practicing law. From 2004 to 2012, he practised commercial law at Gowling Lafleur Henderson. In February 2012, Cauchon joined the firm of Heenan Blaikie in Montreal. He is now counsel at the Montreal office of DS Lawyers Canada LLP.

He is also member of numerous boards. He is a Vice-Chairman of the Canada China Business Council.

Between March 2015 and August 2019, he also bought from the Desmarais family the newspaper chain that he baptized Groupe Capitales Médias (Le Nouvelliste, Le Quotidien, Le Soleil, La Tribune, La Voix de l'est and Ontario-based Le Droit) and he asked Claude Gagnon to manage it for him. Faced with lower subscription rate, declining advertising rates, and delays in federal government aid, it ended in bankruptcy protection and relaunched as a co-op in December 2019.

== Electoral record ==
2011 Canadian federal election
Party	Candidate	Votes	%	±%	Expenditures
New Democratic	Thomas Mulcair	21,906	56.37	+16.84	
Liberal	Martin Cauchon	9,204	23.69	-9.39	
Conservative	Rodolphe Husny	3,408	8.77	-1.76	
Bloc Québécois	Élise Daoust	3,199	8.23	-4.32	
Green	François Pilon	838	2.16	-2.15	
Rhinoceros	Tommy Gaudet	160	0.41	–	
Communist	Johan Boyden	143	0.37	–	
Total valid votes/Expense limit		38,858	100.00		
Total rejected ballots		291	0.74	+0.05	
Turnout		39,149	60.46	+4.35	

2000 Canadian federal election: Outremont
Party	Candidate	Votes	%	±%	Expenditures
Liberal	Martin Cauchon	18,796	47.68	−2.47	$52,920
Bloc Québécois	Amir Khadir	11,151	28.29	−0.10	$50,207
Progressive Conservative	Robert Archambault	3,190	8.09	−4.12	$3,360
New Democratic	Peter Graefe	2,199	5.58	−0.86	$590
Green	Jan Schotte	1,478	3.75	–	$260
Alliance	Josée Duchesneau	1,283	3.25	–	$1,425
Marijuana	Huguette Plourde	1,013	2.57	–	none listed
Marxist–Leninist	Louise Charron	194	0.49	−0.36	$10
Communist	Pierre Smith	118	0.30	–	$187
Total		39,422	100.00		

1997 Canadian federal election
Party	Candidate	Votes	%	±%
Liberal	Martin Cauchon	22,271	50.15	+3.34
Bloc Québécois	Michel Sarra-Bournet	12,608	28.39	-8.98
Progressive Conservative	Marguerite Sicard	5,424	12.21	+3.30
New Democratic	Tooker Gomberg	2,862	6.44	+1.89
Natural Law	Denis Cauchon	868	1.95	+0.45
Marxist–Leninist	Louise Charron	378	0.85	+0.46
Total		44,411	100.00	

1993 Canadian federal election
Party	Candidate	Votes	%	±%
Liberal	Martin Cauchon	21,638	46.81	+12.10
Bloc Québécois	Jean-Louis Hérivault	17,274	37.37	-
Progressive Conservative	Jean Pierre Hogue	4,119	8.91	-29.52
New Democratic	Catherine Kallos	2,104	4.55	-15.93
Natural Law	Daniel Bergeron	694	1.50	-
Marxist–Leninist	Michel Rocheleau	179	0.39	-
Abolitionist	Sylvain M. Coulombe	131	0.28	-
Commonwealth of Canada	Mamunor Rashid	89	0.19	-0.07
Total		46,228	100.00	

Charlevoix

1988 Canadian federal election
Party	Candidate	Votes
Progressive Conservative	Brian Mulroney	33,730
Liberal	Martin Cauchon	5,994
New Democratic	Kenneth Choquette	1,819
Rhinoceros	François Yo Gourd	600

26th Canadian Ministry (1993–2003) – Cabinet of Jean Chrétien
Cabinet posts (2)
Predecessor	Office	Successor
Anne McLellan	Minister of Justice; 2002–2003	Irwin Cotler
Herb Dhaliwal	Minister of National Revenue; 1999–2002	Elinor Caplan
Sub-Cabinet Post
Predecessor	Title	Successor
Paul Martin	Secretary of State (Economic Development Agency of Canada for the Regions of Quebec) (1996–2002) (NB: "Secretary of State (Federal Office of Regional Development - Quebec)" before 1998)	Claude Drouin
