= Le Quotidien (Quebec) =

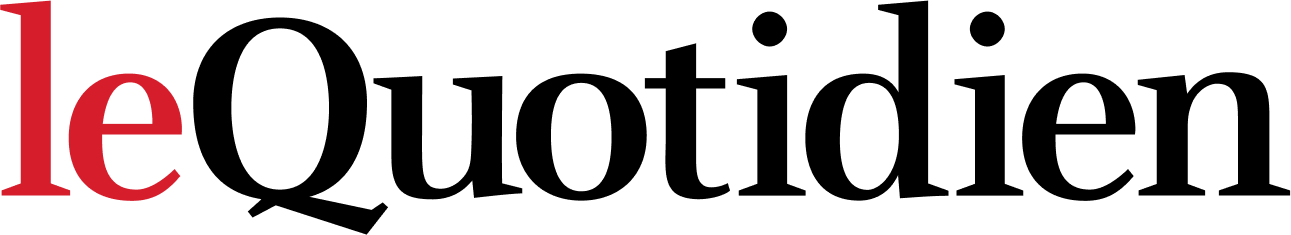
- Type: Daily newspaper
- Founded: October 1, 1973
- Language: French
- City: Saguenay, Quebec
- Country: Canada
- Website: www.lequotidien.com

Le Quotidien (French pronunciation: [lə kɔtidjɛ̃]; lit. The Daily), formerly Le Quotidien du Saguenay Lac-St-Jean, is a daily newspaper in Saguenay, Quebec. It was established October 1, 1973 to replace Le Soleil's Saguenay edition. It was initially owned by Unimédia. It was a broadsheet paper at this time, and had a circulation of about 26,000 in 1980.

The paper was sold to Power Corporation's Gesca division. It was sold to Groupe Capitales Medias in 2015. In 2020, it ceased its print edition, except for its Saturday edition, Le Progrès. It continues as an online newspaper.
