= La Tribune (Sherbrooke) =

Canadian daily newspaper

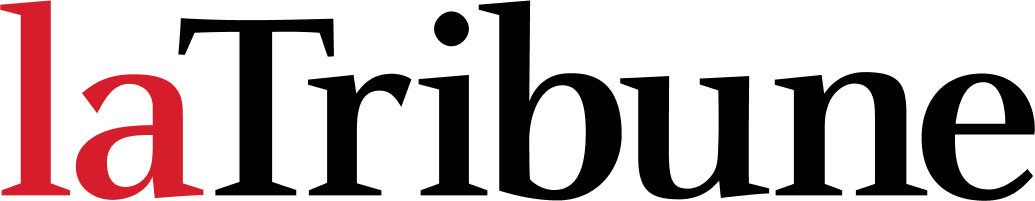

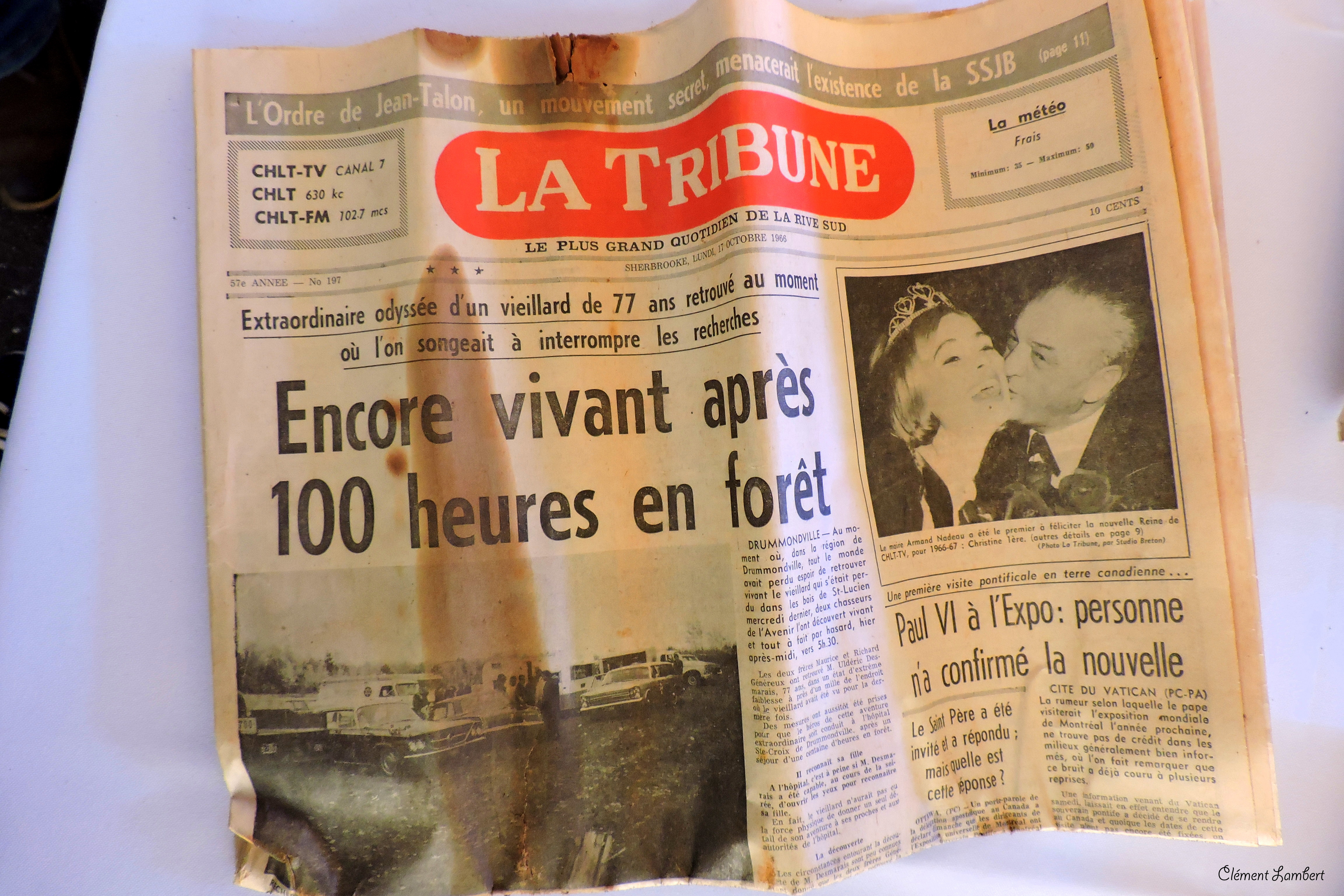
- La Tribune of 1966
- Owner: Groupe Capitales Médias
- Language: French
- Headquarters: 1950, rue Roy; Sherbrooke, Quebec; J1K 2X8
- Country: Canada
- Circulation: 31,018 weekdays 34,157 Saturdays in 2011
- ISSN: 0832-3194
- Website: www.latribune.ca

La Tribune is a Canadian daily newspaper published in Sherbrooke, Quebec.

The newspaper was founded on 21 February 1910 by Jacob Nicol. It was later purchased by Paul Desmarais. It was sold on 14 March 2015 by Gesca to Groupe Capitales Médias, run by Martin Cauchon. The sale included La Tribune and five other regional publications.

The paper ceased its print edition in 2023, continuing as an online paper.
