= Communications Voir =

Canadian newspaper company

Communications Voir is a Canadian newspaper company, which publishes several alternative weekly newspapers, predominantly in the province of Quebec.

The company has published six French weeklies, all based in Quebec, and two English weeklies, one based in Quebec and one in Ontario. The company discontinued several of its titles, including both of the English publications, in 2012.

== Publications ==
French

- Gatineau - Voir Gatineau/Ottawa
- Montreal - Voir Montréal
- Quebec City - Voir Québec
- Saguenay - Voir Saguenay/Alma - Ceased publication on May 3, 2012
- Sherbrooke - Voir Estrie
- Trois-Rivières - Voir Mauricie - Ceased publication on May 3, 2012

English

- Montreal - Hour Community - Ceased publication on May 3, 2012
- Ottawa - xPress - Ceased publication on May 17, 2012
