= Le Petit Journal (Montreal) =

Canadian weekly tabloid newspaper

- Type: Weekly tabloid
- Format: Tabloid
- Founder(s): Roger Maillet and Roland Maillet
- Founded: October 23, 1926
- Language: French
- Headquarters: Montreal, Quebec, Canada

Le Petit Journal was a Canadian French-language weekly tabloid newspaper published in Montreal, Quebec. Founded by brothers Roger and Roland Maillet in 1926 as a successor to their newspaper Le Matin, it has been described as the first tabloid newspaper published in Quebec.

Aimed at a mass readership, Le Petit Journal emphasized crime, local news, sports and entertainment, using large headlines and extensive photography rather than the lengthy political articles characteristic of many newspapers of the period. Its circulation had reached nearly 70,000 copies by around 1935.

== History ==
=== Origins ===
Brothers Roger and Roland Maillet founded Le Matin in Montreal in 1920. The publication was transformed into Le Petit Journal in October 1926. The first issue under the new title appeared on October 23, 1926.

The newspaper appeared during a period of rapid urban growth in Montreal and the development of a working-class mass readership. Unlike the large-format political newspapers traditionally associated with Quebec journalism, tabloids were smaller and designed to be easily read on public transportation. They emphasized local incidents, entertainment, sensational stories and photographs.

Le Petit Journal was the first Quebec newspaper to adopt this model. Its front pages were heavily illustrated and featured subjects including murders and attempted murders, women's fashion, beauty contests, sports and entertainment.

The newspaper presented itself as independent of political parties and trusts and as a newspaper serving ordinary people rather than political or private interests. Despite this claim, it was politically conservative. It supported Montreal mayor and Quebec Conservative leader Camillien Houde and later supported Maurice Duplessis and his Union Nationale. The newspaper's presses were also used to print Union Nationale material.

=== Content and circulation ===
Le Petit Journal was designed for readers who might purchase only one newspaper each week. Selling for five cents, it offered dozens of pages combining news and entertainment. Its contents included crime and other local stories, serialized fiction, extensive sports coverage, comic strips and large numbers of photographs.

The newspaper also carried automobile columns, advice columns, society news, crossword puzzles, fashion, stock-market information and classified advertising. As cinema and radio became increasingly popular, it devoted considerable space to films, radio schedules, cabaret performances and burlesque entertainment.

Its sports coverage was particularly extensive, with detailed accounts and photographs of hockey games and players. By around 1935, circulation had reached nearly 70,000 copies.

During the Second World War, coverage of the conflict occupied a significant part of the newspaper and also influenced its comic strips.

In the decades following the war, Le Petit Journal underwent frequent changes of ownership and adopted an increasingly sensational style. Large headlines and colour photographs became prominent, while new features covering outdoor recreation, travel and subjects directed at women appeared alongside sensational reports and investigations into the private lives of Quebecers.

=== Writers and journalists ===
Journalist and polemicist Jean-Charles Harvey was a frequent contributor and served for a period as the newspaper's publication director.

A number of writers, journalists and broadcasters who later became prominent in Quebec worked at Le Petit Journal early in their careers. They included historian Robert Rumilly, writer and broadcaster Janette Bertrand, broadcaster and publisher Alain Stanké, novelist Andrée Maillet, political columnist Lysiane Gagnon, broadcaster René Homier-Roy and playwright Jean-Claude Germain. BAnQ also identifies Pierre Bourgault and writer and filmmaker Roger Fournier among those who began their journalism careers at the newspaper.

The newspaper published the comic strip La Mère Jasette, created by H. Christin, from 1939 to 1951.

Charles Mayer was the sportswriter beginning in 1933, and was named its executive sports editor in 1952.

=== Decline and closure ===
By the late 1970s, the newspaper's traditional formula had lost much of its appeal.

Sources differ concerning its final year of publication. The Chronologie de Montréal maintained by the Université du Québec à Montréal records that Le Petit Journal ceased publication in 1978, while the descriptive history accompanying the digitized newspaper collection of the Bibliothèque et Archives nationales du Québec states that publication ended in October 1981.

== Legacy ==
Le Petit Journal played an important role in the emergence of tabloid journalism in Quebec. The Encyclopédie du patrimoine culturel de l'Amérique française identifies it as the first Quebec tabloid and places its appearance within a broader shift toward an urban popular press emphasizing crime, entertainment, sensationalism and visual material.

Its visual style has also been compared with that of American yellow papers. Academic research into Quebec's interwar popular press has described Le Petit Journal as the first French-language tabloid published in Quebec and noted that its sister publication, Photo-Journal, founded in 1937, followed a similar model.

Issues of Le Petit Journal have been digitized by the Bibliothèque et Archives nationales du Québec, which describes the newspaper as a record of more than fifty years of Quebec and international life and particularly of the social history of Montreal.

== See also ==
- Allô Police
- Photo-Journal
- Tabloid journalism
