= Allô Police =

Canadian crime tabloid published in Quebec

- Type: Weekly tabloid
- Format: Tabloid
- Founder(s): Robert Poulin, Berthold Brisebois and Fernand Boisseau
- Founded: February 28, 1953
- Ceased publication: July 2004
- Language: French
- Headquarters: Montreal, Quebec, Canada

Allô Police was a Canadian French-language weekly tabloid published in Montreal, Quebec, from 1953 to 2004. It specialized in crime journalism, covering murders, organized crime, police investigations and trials, often publishing graphic photographs of crime scenes and victims.

At its height during the 1970s and 1980s, Allô Police reportedly sold approximately 150,000 copies a week.

== History ==
Allô Police was founded by journalists Robert Poulin, Berthold Brisebois and Fernand Boisseau. Its first issue appeared on February 28, 1953.

The founders described the newspaper as serving a social and moral purpose, arguing that reports of criminal behaviour could warn readers about its consequences. The newspaper published photographs of murder victims, suspects and weapons, along with detailed descriptions of crime scenes.

The newspaper covered murders, robberies, organized crime, prostitution and other criminal and judicial matters. A study of the publication found that reports concerning criminal offences accounted for 52.94 per cent of its content between 1953 and 1959, increasing to 85.19 per cent during the 1970s and 77.14 per cent between 1990 and 2000.

Allô Police published an annual review of murders committed in Quebec. Researchers comparing its lists with official statistics found an error rate of approximately ten per cent.

Journalist Claude Poirier later described Allô Police as an important source of information for the public and police forces. He recalled close relationships between its journalists and members of the Montreal police and the Sûreté du Québec.

Among the criminals and criminal cases covered by the newspaper were Richard Blass, Jacques Mesrine, Monica "la Mitraille" Proietti, Lucien Rivard, Frank Cotroni and Maurice Boucher.

In 2000, Poirier attended the wedding of a member of the Hells Angels, where singers Ginette Reno and Jean-Pierre Ferland performed. Photographs from the wedding subsequently appeared on the front pages of major Quebec newspapers.

That year, Allô Police was acquired by lawyer Jean-Pierre Rancourt and media businessman Richard Desmarais through Section Rouge Média Inc. The new owners eliminated nudity from the publication.

In 2003, the newspaper was renamed Allô! Week-end and changed to a general-interest format. Publication ended in July 2004.

== Legacy and archives ==
In 2019, the rights to the Allô Police collection were acquired by Madame Karine, a company specializing in audiovisual research. The newspaper's archives were subsequently used for the 2025 book La filière Allô Police : Les vedettes du crime au Québec, by Karine Perron, Annie Richard and Jean-Philippe Rousseau. The book examined eleven Quebec criminal cases using material from the publication.

== See also ==
- Tabloid journalism
