= Le Devoir =

Canadian newspaper in Montreal, Quebec

- The battle of three begins. Le Devoir on the 2003 Quebec election.
- Type: Daily newspaper
- Format: Broadsheet
- Owner: Le Devoir Inc.
- Publisher: Brian Myles
- Editor: Marie-Andrée Chouinard
- Founded: 1910; 116 years ago
- Political alignment: Quebec nationalism, social democracy
- Headquarters: 1265, rue Berri; Montreal, Quebec; H3A 3M9
- Country: Canada
- Circulation: 29,812 daily 48,228 Saturday (as of 2011)
- ISSN: 0319-0722
- Website: ledevoir.com

Le Devoir (French pronunciation: [lə də.vwɑʁ], 'Duty') is a French-language newspaper published in Montreal and distributed in Quebec and throughout Canada. It was founded by journalist and politician Henri Bourassa in 1910.

Le Devoir is one of few independent large-circulation newspapers in Quebec (and one of the few in Canada) in a market dominated by the media conglomerate Quebecor (including Le Journal de Montréal).

Historically Le Devoir was considered Canada's francophone newspaper of record, although by the end of the 20th century, that title was mostly used for its competitor La Presse. (Note: La Presse ceased physical publication in 2016, and is now available only as a digital newspaper.) As of 2023, La Presse retains a higher readership compared to Le Devoir.

== History ==
Henri Bourassa, a young Liberal Party MP from Montreal, rose to national prominence in 1899 when he resigned his seat in Parliament in protest at the Liberal government's decision to send troops to support the British in the South African War of 1899–1902. Bourassa was opposed to all Canadian participation in British wars and would go on to become a key figure in fighting for an independent Canadian foreign policy. He is considered both a forebear of French-Canadian nationalists as well as a Canadian nationalist more generally. He was also an early promoter of the bi-cultural Anglo-French concept of Canada, and an impassioned advocate for the political and cultural equality of all French Canadians within Confederation, wherever they may reside.

In 1910, he founded Le Devoir as an outlet for his anti-imperialist Ligue nationaliste and to fight for the rights of French Canadians within Confederation. In its first edition, published January 10, 1910, Bourassa explained the name ("the duty" in English) and the mandate of the newspaper as "To ensure the triumph of ideas over appetites, of the public good over partisan interests, there is but one means: awake in the people, and above all in the ruling classes, a sense of public duty in all its forms: religious duty, national duty, civic duty."

Bourassa was both publisher and editor-in-chief of the newspaper until August 3, 1932, when he was replaced by Georges Pelletier. After the death of Pelletier in early 1947, the role of editor-in-chief would pass to Gérard Filion, former editor of La Terre de chez nous, under whose editorship the paper would publish highly controversial critiques of Maurice Duplessis's government in Quebec by journalists and figures such as André Laurendeau. Claude Ryan, a federalist, took the helm in 1964, followed by Jean-Louis Roy in 1980, then Benoit Lauzière in 1986. In 1990, the paper appointed its first woman editor-in-chief when Lise Bissonnette succeeded Lauzière, and firmly establishing the paper's sovereignist orientation following the federalist years of Ryan and his successors. She would continue on in her post until 1998, with the current editor-in-chief, Bernard Descôteaux, taking over the following year.

While the paper has in recent times become associated with the Quebec nationalist movement, Bourassa himself was in fact opposed to the notion of a separate Francophone state, believing instead in an Anglo-French conception of Canada in which French-speaking Canadians would see their culture recognized as equal and protected and encouraged from coast to coast. Instances of this view can be found in both his campaign for Franco-Ontarian rights as well as his ardent opposition to controversial priest and historian Lionel Groulx in the 1920s following Groulx's musing on the possibility and desirability of a separate Quebec state. That said, the history of Le Devoir would become characterized by varying phases (as well as shades) of French-Canadian and later Québécois nationalism, opening its pages in the troubled 1930s to Groulx and his followers, yet seeing a federalist at its helm in 1964 in the form of Claude Ryan, who in 1978 would go on to become leader of the federalist Quebec Liberal Party.

Ideologically, Le Devoir has been a chief voice against military intervention and in favour of pacifism and social democracy, opposing conscription in World War II (see Conscription Crisis of 1944) and endorsing, under federalist Ryan's tenure, the election of René Lévesque's Parti Québécois in the 1976 election, despite its platform centred on Québécois nationalism. Once considered a reformist paper, it has recently been associated less with ideas that challenge the status quo of Quebec's economic, political and cultural issues.

=== Endorsements ===
Election	Endorsement	Ref.
2006 federal	BQ	
2008 federal	BQ	
2011 federal	BQ	
2015 federal	BQ	
2019 federal	BQ	
2021 federal	BQ	

== Business ==
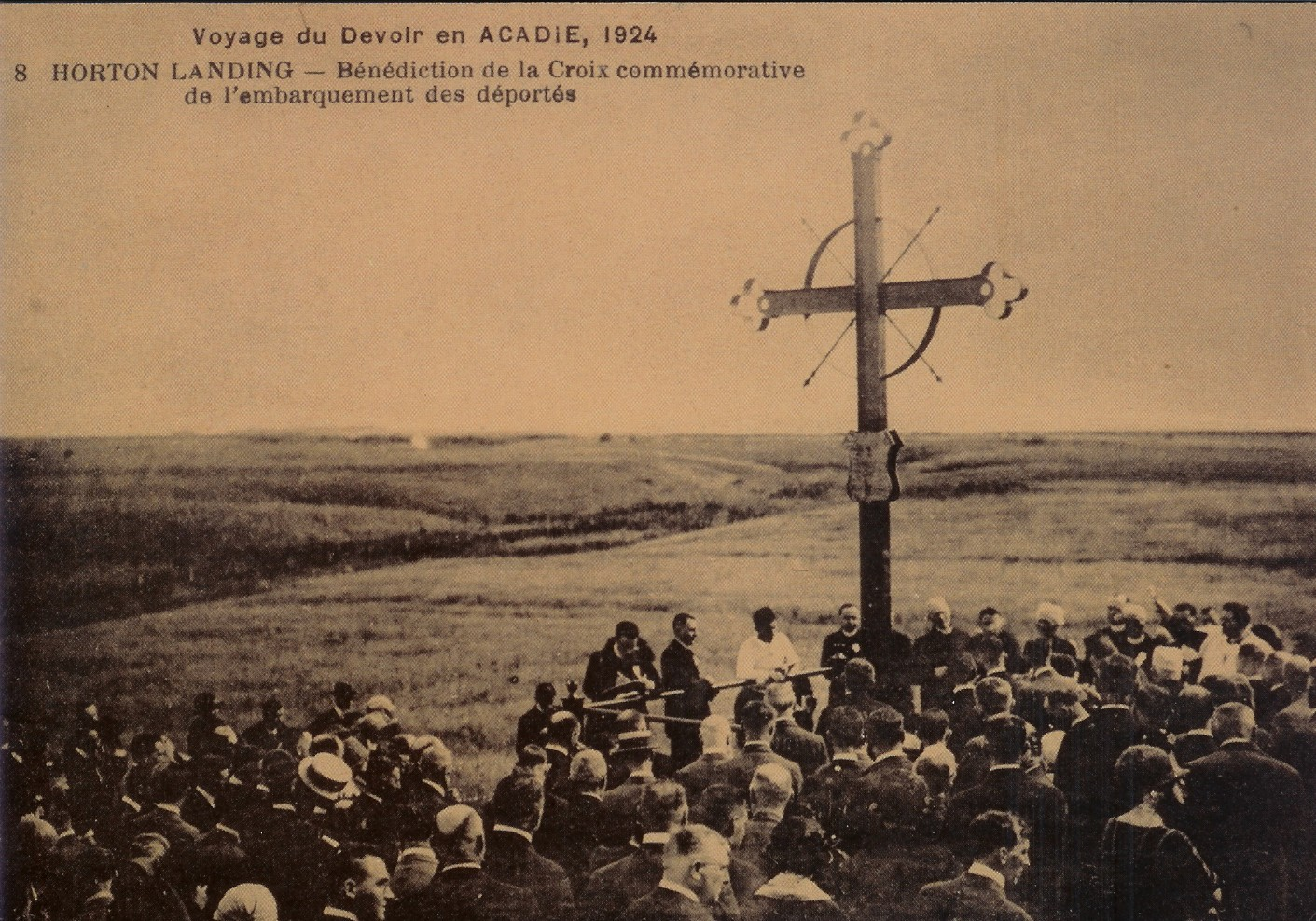
Le Devoir trip to Acadia (Grand-Pré), 1924

Le Devoir began as several other businesses besides the newspaper. These ventures included a general printer and publishing house, a bookstore, and a travel agency. Trips were initially organized to coincide with Catholic congresses around the world, as well as for "pilgrimages", allowing Quebecois to visit the French diaspora across North America. Such trips included Acadia (1924, 1927), Ontario (1925), and Louisiana (1931). The purpose of the travel venture was, said Napoleon Lafortune, to "extend the 'work' of the newspaper to defend the French language and the Catholic faith, but by other means." The unusual service officially lasted from 1924 to 1947, though it effectively ended at the start of World War II when international civilian travel became very difficult.

Le Devoir has a relatively low circulation of about 34,000 on weekdays and 58,000 on Saturdays. Its financial situation has often been precarious. For example, in 2002 it had revenues of $14,376,530, with a meager profit of $13,524, while the previous year it had incurred a small loss.

== Other information ==
The newspaper's original slogan was "Fais ce que dois" (Do what [you] must). "Le Devoir" means "the duty" in French. Its current slogan is "Libre de penser" (Free to think).

In 1993, following a redesign by Lucie Lacava, a Montreal-based design consultant, the Society for News Design awarded Le Devoir Best of Show award for "Overall Design Excellence" and in 1994 the same group awarded it its Gold award in the Feature Design category.

In September 2011, the National Film Board of Canada and Le Devoir announced that they will be jointly hosting three interactive essays on their websites, ONF.ca and ledevoir.com.

Le Devoir headquarters have been located in Montreal at 71A rue Saint-Jacques from 1910 to 1914; at 443 rue Saint-Vincent in Old Montreal from 1914 to 1924; at 430 rue Notre-Dame East from 1924 to 1972; at 211 rue du Saint-Sacrement from 1972 to 1992, at 2050 rue de Bleury from 1992 to 2016; before moving to 1265 rue Berri on December 11, 2016.

== Publishers ==
- Henri Bourassa (1910–1932)
- Georges Pelletier (1932–1947)
- Gérard Filion (1947–1963)
- Claude Ryan (1963–1978)
- Jean-Louis Roy (1980–1986)
- Benoît Lauzière (1986–1990)
- Lise Bissonnette (1990–1998)
- Bernard Descôteaux (1999–2016)
- Brian Myles (2016–current)

== Contributors ==
Notable contributors have included the following.

- Stéphane Baillargeon
- Pierre Bourgault
- Sylvain Cormier
- Gil Courtemanche
- Michel David
- Fabien Deglise
- Henriette Dessaulles (Fadette)
- Jean Dion
- Louis Hamelin
- Chantal Hébert
- Normand Hudon
- Napoléon Lafortune
- Pierre Laporte
- André Laurendeau
- Jean-Marc Léger
- Gilles Marcotte
- Christian Rioux
- Michel Roy
- Paul Sauriol
- Michel Venne

== See also ==
- List of Quebec media

Montréal newspapers:

- The Gazette
- La Presse
- Le Journal de Montréal
- Métro
- Montreal Daily News (defunct)
- Montreal Star (defunct)
