= Le Soleil (Quebec) =

French-language daily newspaper in Quebec City, Canada

- Type: Daily newspaper
- Format: Digital
- Founded: 1896
- Headquarters: 410, boulevard Charest Est; 3rd Floor; Quebec City, Quebec; G1K 8G3
- Country: Canada
- ISSN: 0319-0730
- Website: lesoleil.com

Le Soleil (transl. The Sun) is a French-language daily newspaper in Quebec City, Quebec. It was founded on December 28, 1896, and became a digital newspaper in 2023. Its print editions were distributed mainly in Quebec City; however, it was also for sale at newsstands in Ottawa, Montreal, New Brunswick and some places in Florida, where many Quebecers spend the winter. It has been owned by several media groups but is now a worker cooperative and is a member of the CN2i network.

Le Soleil was published first as a broadsheet, then in compact format since April 2006. It ceased its print edition in 2023 and is now a fully digital publication.

== History ==
Le Soleil rose from the ashes of L'Électeur, the official newspaper of the Liberal Party of Canada, which shut down in December 1896. The first edition was published on December 28, 1896. one day after the disappearance of its predecessor, which shut down because the Catholic clergy had forbidden it to parishioners when the newspaper criticized the Church's electoral interference. It was renamed Le Soleil in reference to Le Soleil, a daily newspaper based in Paris by the same name.

In 1957, Le Soleil (then owned by Oscar Gilbert) cut ties with the Liberal Party of Canada to concentrate on news coverage. Daily circulation rose past 100,000 in the 1960s, and over 150,000 in the 1970s.

Beginning in 1973, many large corporations began to express interest in acquiring Le Soleil. Controversy was stirred when Paul Desmarais's Power Corporation of Canada announced its intention to buy the daily. It provoked the intervention of Quebec Premier Robert Bourassa because such a transaction would have concentrated 70% of Quebec francophone daily newspapers in the hands of a single company. Eventually, the paper was bought by Unimédia.

In 1987, Conrad Black's Hollinger Inc. acquired the newspaper, which would eventually pass into the hands of Groupe Gesca. Gesca was a wholly owned subsidiary of Power Corporation of Canada and also owned most of Quebec's francophone dailies including La Presse, thus realizing Bourassa's fear.

In 2006, the newspaper had switched to a tabloid format at the same time as Sherbrooke's La Tribune and Trois-Rivières' Le Nouvelliste, all of which were then owned by Gesca. Recent declines in readership due to competition by Le Journal de Québec was the main explanation of the switch from a broadsheet format.

In 2015, Gesca sold Le Soleil and five other daily newspapers to Groupe Capitales Médias, run by former federal cabinet minister Martin Cauchon. Cauchon's media group filed for bankruptcy in 2019. All five of its publications, including Le Soleil, were turned into workers' coops.

== Circulation ==
Like most Canadian daily newspapers, Le Soleil has seen a decline in circulation. Its total circulation dropped by 7 percent to 78,455 copies daily from 2009 to 2015. In 2020, in the wake of the COVID-19 pandemic, the newspaper ceased its daily print edition, maintaining only its online activities as well as a weekly Saturday print edition; the Saturday edition was then abandoned in 2023.

Daily average

== Notable staff ==
- François Gagnon, ice hockey journalist covering the Montreal Canadiens
