= Photo-Journal =

Weekly newspaper in Quebec

- Type: Weekly newspaper
- Founder: Rolland Maillet
- Founded: 1937
- Ceased publication: 1981
- Language: French

Photo-Journal was a weekly newspaper in Québec.

Photo-Journal had a focus on illustrations and covered the entertainment world in particular.

== History ==
This newspaper was founded by Rolland Maillet. It was first published in 1937. It was sold to Jean-Louis Lévesque in 1964, to Jacques Brillant in 1966, to J.-Laurent Leduc in 1969, to Claude Coupal in 1973 and to Normand G. Robidoux in 1974.

In 1979, the newspaper filed for bankruptcy.

Gilles Brown attempted to save it at the same time as Le Petit Journal. He was unsuccessful and the newspaper ceased publication in October 1981.
