= Hour Community =

Former English weekly newspaper in Montreal

Hour
- The February 1, 2007 front page of Hour
- Type: Alternative weekly
- Format: Tabloid
- Owner: Communications Voir
- Publisher: Pierre Paquet
- Editor-in-chief: Kevin Laforest
- Founded: 1993; 33 years ago
- Ceased publication: 2012; 14 years ago
- Political alignment: Social Democracy, Canadian Federalism
- Language: English
- Headquarters: Montreal, Quebec Canada
- Circulation: 56,762
- Price: Free
- ISSN: 1192-6708
- Website: hour.ca

Hour was an English-language urban news weekly paper published in Montreal, Quebec, Canada, by Communications Voir. Its president-publisher was Pierre Paquet, the editor-in-chief was Kevin Laforest. The first issue was published on February 4, 1993. It catered to Montreal's anglophone community and was published every Thursday. The news features "expose readers to new ideas and alternative policies". News coverage centered on film, arts, and nightlife. In 2011, the magazine was renamed Hour Community.

On May 2, 2012, editor Kevin Laforest announced that Hour Community would cease operations, following its last issue on May 3.

== See also ==
- List of newspapers in Canada
