= Gesca =

Canadian French-language newspaper chain

Gesca Limitée is a division of the Power Corporation of Canada, which published French-language daily newspapers in the provinces of Quebec and Ontario.

Gesca has since 2013 responded to the Internet challenge by expanding its free online services, which it supports through advertising.

All of the company's publications, including Le Soleil in Quebec City and Le Droit in Ottawa, were sold to Groupe Capitales Médias in 2015. The only publication that was retained by Gesca at the time, La Presse in Montreal, became an independent non-profit in 2018.

== See also ==
- History of Canadian newspapers
- List of newspapers in Canada
