= Gerhard Scholten =

Dutch Canadian agricultural chemist

- Born: Arnold Gerhard Scholten; June 3, 1928; Aalten, Netherlands
- Died: November 15, 2019 (aged 91); Collingwood, Ontario
- Awards: YMCA Peace Medal (1999)

Academic background
- Thesis: The Reaction of Phosphate with Mineral Surfaces and Iron Oxide Gels (1965)
- Doctoral advisor: Richard B. Corey
- Other advisors: Alfred J. Wojta; Champ B. Tanner; George L. Humphrey

Academic work
- Discipline: Agricultural chemistry
- Main interests: Raman spectroscopy

Gerhard Scholten (born Arnold Gerhard Scholten) was a Dutch Canadian agricultural chemist and social activist.

== Education ==
Scholten received his Bachelor of Science in Agriculture from the University of Alberta in Spring 1957. In Fall 1957, Scholten commenced graduate studies at the University of Wisconsin at Madison under the direction of agricultural scientist Dr. Alfred J. Wojta. Wojta fell ill in 1958 and Scholten continued studies with Champ B. Tanner, culminating in the publication of Scholten's 1959 work Mechanized Tile Drainage, Sub-Irrigation, and Aeration. Scholten continued graduate studies at Madison, completing his PhD The Reaction of Phosphate With Mineral Surfaces and Iron Oxide Gels in 1965 under the supervision of Dr. Richard B. Corey. In 1965, Scholten received a post-Doctoral fellowship from West Virginia University in which he was sent to teach soil science for two years at Bukalasa Agricultural College in Wobulenzi, Uganda. In 1971, Scholten received a second Masters of Science under the supervision of George L. Humphrey at WVU, which led to the publication of Raman Spectral Studies of Some Alcohols, Amines and Amino Alcohols.

== Activism ==
Following graduate studies, Scholten returned to Canada, settling in Moose Jaw, Saskatchewan circa 1978 (Note: In 2001, the Moose Jaw Times-Herald stated that Scholten had moved to Moose Jaw "23 years ago," giving an approximate difference of 1978.) and becoming President for the Moose Jaw chapters of the Council of Canadians and Amnesty International. In his work as President of the Council of Canadians' Moose Jaw Chapter, Scholten was a vocal opponent of the 3rd Summit of the Americas, as well as the trade deals proposed at the WTO meeting of 1999 and 2001. Scholten was also publicly critical of the Iraq War. In 1999, Scholten was awarded the YMCA Peace Medal for his activism with Amnesty International and the Council of Canadians.

== Personal life ==
Scholten was an avid alpine skier and was chairman of the Moose Jaw Alpine Ski Club, where he advocated for funding for White Track Ski Resort in 2005 and 2006.

== Bibliography ==
Per OCLC Worldcat.

- Mechanized Tile Drainage, Sub-Irrigation, and Aeration (1959)
- The Reaction of Phosphate With Mineral Surfaces and Iron Oxide Gels (1965)
- Raman Spectral Studies of Some Alcohols, Amines and Amino Alcohols (1971)

== See also ==
- Raman spectroscopy
