= Ivan Miller =

Ivan Miller could be:

- Ivan Miller (journalist) (1898–1967), Canadian journalist and sportscaster
- Ivan Miller (cricketer) (1913–1966), Australian cricketer
- Ivan Miller (motocross rider) (born 1949), New Zealand motocross rider
