= Jason Kajiura =

Jason Kajiura is a Canadian-born Physiologist, and former Ontario 800m track Indoor Champion, and Canadian 800m track Outdoor Champion. He currently trains with the Hamilton Olympic Club (HOC).

Kajiura was the recipient of the City of Hamilton Sports Council All Sport Award (1999), City of Hamilton Civic Award (1996), Hamilton Olympic Club Outstanding Contribution Award (2003), Ontario Heart Foundation Science Scholarship, and several University entrance scholarships. In addition to his athletic and academic accomplishments, Kajiura was also a volunteer National Level track coach with the Hamilton Olympic Club; producing City, GHAC, SOSSA, OFSAA, Ontario, and Canadian champions. Kajiura was a member of the OTFA, HOC Board of Directors, founder of the "HOC Track Masochists", and the designer of the current HOC logo.

Kajiura is a published author in numerous scientific journals (in Sports Medicine, Physiology, Neuroscience, Pharmacology, Immunology and Neuropharmacology), an artist (painter), and accomplished professional drummer/University percussionist, and studio musician. As a science undergraduate student, after nationwide University music auditions, Kajiura was chosen as one of the top 3 University percussionist/drummers in Canada. Kajiura was subsequently honoured at Rideau Hall in Ottawa, by Governor General Edward Shreyer, and performed for Prime Minister Trudeau, and many foreign dignitaries, including Prince Charles and Princess Diana, during their royal visit to Canada.

Kajiura is also the nephew and former student of the Supreme Karate Master, Masaru Shintani (9th Dan Canadian Black Belt Hall of Fame member and founder of the largest Martial Arts Organization in North America).
