= Eden High School =

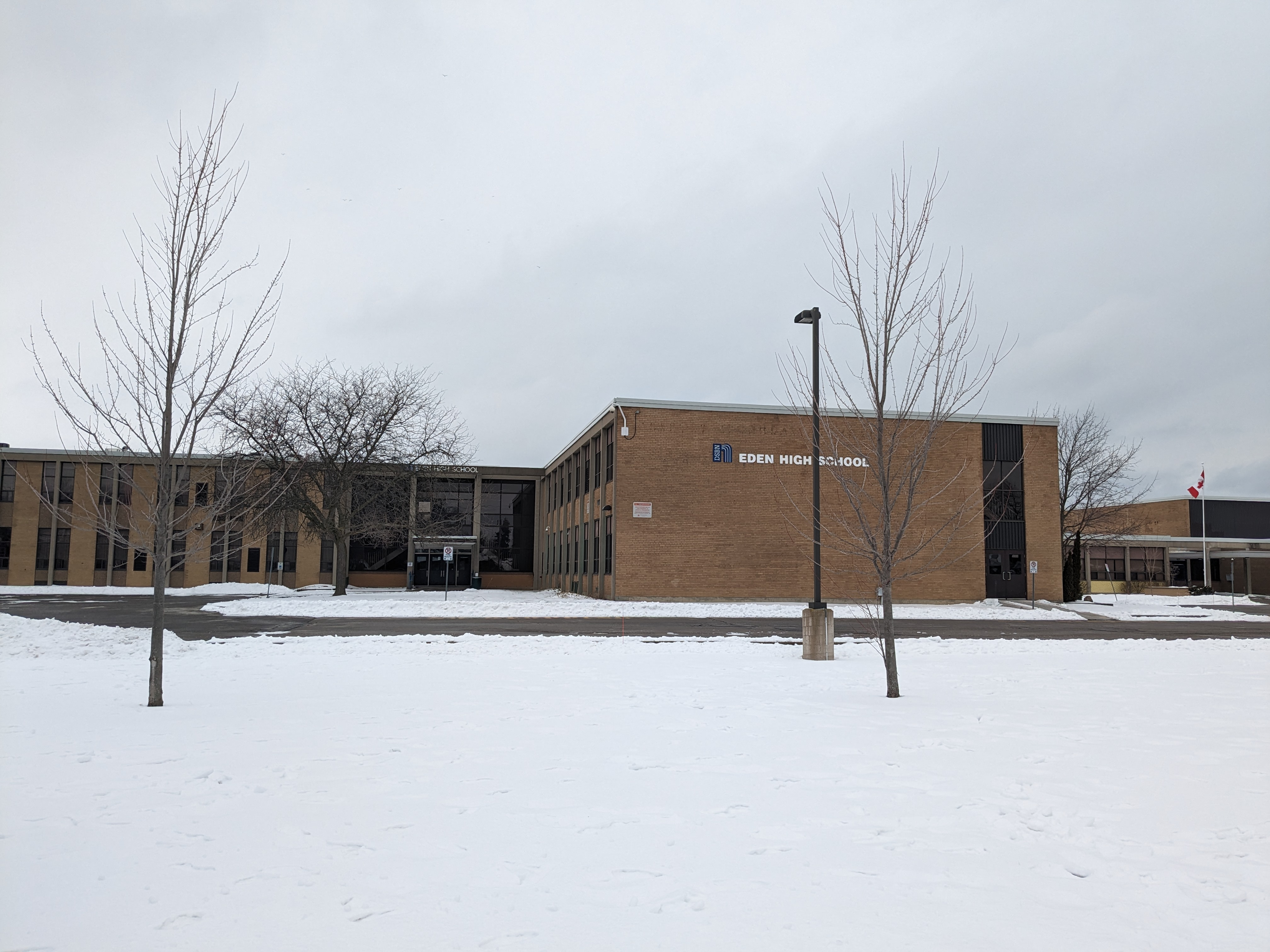

Location
- 535 Lake Street; St. Catharines, Ontario, L2N 4H7; Canada; 43.191441°N 79.252873°W

Information
- Type: Public Secondary School
- Established: 1945
- School board: District School Board of Niagara
- Principal: Mat Miller
- Faculty: 74
- Grades: 9 to 12
- Enrollment: 1,115
- Language: English
- Campus: St Catharines (2000 to present); 497 Scott St, St Catharines (1997 to 1999); Locust Grove Estate, Niagara-on-the-Lake (1945–1996)
- Colours: Royal Blue and White
- Mascot: Bald eagle (Haliaeetus leucocephalus)
- Yearbook: Eden Echoes
- Website: eden.dsbn.org

Eden High School, also known simply as Eden, is a public secondary school in St. Catharines, Ontario, Canada. It is located on the corner of Lake St. and Linwell Rd. Eden is a part of the District School Board of Niagara (DSBN). The school was founded in 1945 as Eden Christian College.

== History ==
Eden High School was originally located in the neighbouring town of Niagara-on-the-Lake, but moved to St. Catharines as the school population began to grow. When the school moved to St. Catharines it shared buildings with Lakeport Secondary School until 2011. The roots of Eden High School reach back to the founding of the Virgil-Vineland Bible School Society in 1938, by early Mennonite Brethren settlers in the Niagara Peninsula. The founder of the school was Rev. Isaac Ewert, who began running evening classes under the auspices of the society in late 1938.

The school was officially founded in 1945 by an act of the Bible Society of Virgil as a private day and boarding school, Eden Christian College. It was discussed at the Ontario Conference of Mennonite Brethens throughout the 1970s and 1980s as running the school took more than two-thirds of its operating budget. The student population was split between those who adhered to Mennonite Brethen and United Mennonite teachings. In 1988, Eden was included as an alternative trial school under the Lincoln County Board of Education, which caused student enrollment to grow as tuition fees were eliminated. In 1998, the Lincoln County Board of Education became part of the District School Board of Niagara, a current public school district.

== Programs ==
Eden High School has a Specialized School to Community Program (formerly known as Special Needs) with individualized instruction for approximately 40 students. Upon completion of the program, students earn a Certificate of Accomplishment. Eden also offers Specialist High Skills Major programs in Business, Construction, Sport, and Transportation. It also has a Spiritual Life Centre, which is a student program that offers spiritual mentorship.

== Athletics ==
The Eden Flyers compete in the Niagara Region High School Athletics Association (NRHSAA) region, one of four zones in the Southern Ontario Secondary Schools Association (SOSSA). As of 2023, a synthetic grass field was planned for the school.

=== Volleyball ===
The boys' team has won the OFSAA volleyball championship 12 times, including an eight-year win streak from 2006 to 2013 and titles in 2015, 2018 and 2019 in AA, and 2021 in AAA. The girls' volleyball team won the OFSAA title in 2015.

=== Basketball ===
Eden's boys' basketball team has competed in five OFSAA championships tournaments. The 2023-24 Flyers won the school's first-ever Welland Tribune Tournament championship with a 70-55 win over the A.N. Myer Marauders. They went on to end the season with a strong performance at OFSAA, finishing in fourth place, their best in the provincial championships.

== Spiritual Life Centre ==
Although officially a public school, Eden's Spiritual Life Centre (SLC) provides students with an optional morning chapel and daily services.

== Alumni ==
- Melanie Kok – Olympic rower

== See also ==
- Education in Ontario
- List of high schools in Ontario
- Southern Ontario Secondary Schools Association
- Ontario Federation of School Athletic Associations
