= Windsor Star =

Canadian daily newspaper in Ontario

- Front page of the June 2, 2020 edition
- Type: Daily newspaper
- Format: Broadsheet
- Owner: Postmedia Network
- Founded: 1888; 138 years ago
- Headquarters: 300 Ouellette Avenue; Windsor, Ontario; N9A 7B4
- Circulation: 49,312 weekdays 51,119 Saturdays (as of 2015)
- ISSN: 0839-2277
- OCLC number: 723967057
- Website: windsorstar.com

The Windsor Star is a daily newspaper based in Windsor, Ontario, Canada. Owned by Postmedia Network, it is published Tuesdays through Saturdays.

== History ==
The paper began as the weekly Windsor Record in 1888, changing its name to the Border Cities Star in 1918, when it was bought by W. F. Herman. The Border Cities Star was a daily newspaper published from September 3, 1918, until June 28, 1935. The founders W. F. Herman and Hugh Graybiel purchased the existing daily newspaper, the Windsor Record (known as the Evening Record from 1890 to November 1917), from John A. McKay on August 6, 1918.

There was some conflict before the men purchased the newspaper. The Windsor Record had only partial wire service, and some felt that the national and international news was not sufficiently covered. Originally, the Border Cities Star was intended to be a rival daily newspaper to the Windsor Record. However, Herman's application to Canadian Press Limited for full wire service was denied because of opposition by McKay.. He had held a variety of committee executive positions at the organization over the years. McKay eventually agreed to subscribe to the full wire service and sold the Windsor Record to W. F. Herman for an inflated price. Many viewed that as a flaw of the Canadian Press Limited. The wire service, which was subsidized by government funds, was run mainly by a group of publishers that could use it as a way of limiting competition and increasing the value of their own newspapers (Border Cities Era: October 18, 1918, page 7).

Herman had previous experience in the newspaper industry since he had owned the Prince Albert Daily Herald, the Saskatoon Capital, and the Regina Leader-Post. Herman became the paper's president, and Graybiel assumed the role of business manager. They changed the name of the Windsor Record to the Border Cities Star to reflect not only Windsor but also all the surrounding communities.

On page 4 of its inaugural issue, the new owners state that in their "Aims and Endeavors" that they intend to make it "a worth-while newspaper for worth-while people." They proposed two main goals: one was to work with and build up local institutions and organizations. The newspaper "must endeavor to become one with its community, to enter closely into its daily life and being, and to voice for the community the otherwise largely inarticulate striving for the attainment of the largest self-development." The other goal was "to be worthy of Canada." They appealed to Canadian pride and nationalism, in particular with regard to Canadians' contributions to the ongoing war, and stated their intention "to be broad, to be faithful, to be progressive and forward-looking, to be free and independent and unprejudiced. The Canadian who is not proud of our mighty country has no right or title to its citizenship." They identified two other goals: the revision of tariffs and to "uphold the English language as the only proper language and method of instruction in the primary grades of the public schools." That was a somewhat-controversial stand because of the ongoing conflict between Anglophones and Francophones over educational rights in Ontario.

Initially, the Border Cities Star was published from the Record Printing Company offices at 36 Sandwich Street West, on the north side of Sandwich Street, just west of Ferry Street. In 1923, it moved to a building on Ferry Street, and in 1927, it expanded into adjacent new larger premises, at the corner of Ferry Street and Pitt Street.

When the city of Windsor annexed Walkerville, East Windsor (Ford City), Sandwich, and Ojibway in 1935, the Border Cities Star changed its name to the Windsor Daily Star. Although Herman died in 1938, the paper continued under the direction of his wife, Adie Knox Herman, along with Hugh Graybiel and W. L. (Lum) Clark. In 1959, it became simply the Windsor Star.

The paper was sold to Southam Inc. in 1971 and then to Canwest, which bought Southam from Hollinger, in 2000.

In November 1996, the paper opened a printing facility in south-central Windsor.

In 2013, the Windsor Star moved to a new facility at 300 Ouellette Avenue, formerly occupied by the CTV Two owned-and-operated station CHWI-DT. The former 167 Ferry Street building was sold to the University of Windsor, which opened a new downtown campus at the facility in 2015.

In February 2019, the paper announced that it will no longer publish a Monday edition effective March 4, 2019.

On January 31, 2023, the Windsor Star had announced that effective on March 3, its plant in south-central Windsor will be shut down, and printing will be done in London and at Islington (by sister papers London Free Press and Toronto Sun, respectively).

== Circulation ==
The Windsor Star has seen, like most Canadian daily newspapers, a decline in circulation. Its total circulation dropped by 22 percent to 49,613 copies daily from 2009 to 2015.

Daily average

== Notable staff ==
- Scott Burnside, sports journalist and Elmer Ferguson Memorial Award recipient
- Jack Dulmage, sports journalist and Elmer Ferguson Memorial Award recipient
- David Griffin, editorial staff, Olympic athlete, and Royal Canadian Air Force officer

== See also ==
- List of newspapers in Canada
