= Alfred J. Wojta =

American agricultural engineer and professor (1909–1959)

- Born: January 5, 1909
- Died: July 21, 1959 (aged 50); Madison, Wisconsin, U.S.

Academic work
- Discipline: Agronomy
- Sub-discipline: Soil science
- Institutions: University of Wisconsin

Alfred J. Wojta (January 5, 1909 – July 21, 1959) was an American agricultural engineer and professor at the University of Wisconsin. He developed the Wojta system of surface drainage, a land-forming method used to improve drainage and reduce soil erosion on agricultural fields.

== Career ==
Wojta worked in soil conservation and agricultural engineering. In the 1930s, he served as a camp superintendent in Wisconsin soil conservation projects, where practices such as contour farming, strip cropping, and erosion control were implemented. In 1954, he served as chairman of the state steering committee for the Wisconsin Farm Progress Field Day, held in Waupaca County.

His system of surface drainage, developed after 1947, used shallow channels and land smoothing to direct water flow across fields. In 1954, Wojta completed a graduate thesis titled Draft Studies of Side-Hitched Implements, examining the mechanics of farm equipment and in 1955, he was promoted from assistant professor to associate professor of agricultural engineering at the University of Wisconsin. In 1958, he served as a consultant on drainage and land development planning for the Pilgrim Park Junior High School site in Wisconsin, advising on tile drainage systems and soil management.

== Legacy ==
Wojta died on July 21, 1959, in Madison, Wisconsin, at the age of 50. Following Wojta's death, the drainage system that he had developed was described in a 1960 publication by Frank V. Burcalow, Russell F. Johannes, and Arthur Edwin Peterson titled "The Wojta System of Surface Drainage." The Wojta system of surface drainage was subsequently applied in agricultural land management in the Midwestern United States.
