= Chedoke =

Chedoke may refer to:

- Chedoke Creek
- Chedoke Falls
- Highway 403 (Ontario), also known as the Chedoke Expressway
