= YMCA of Greater Toronto =

YMCA in Greater Toronto

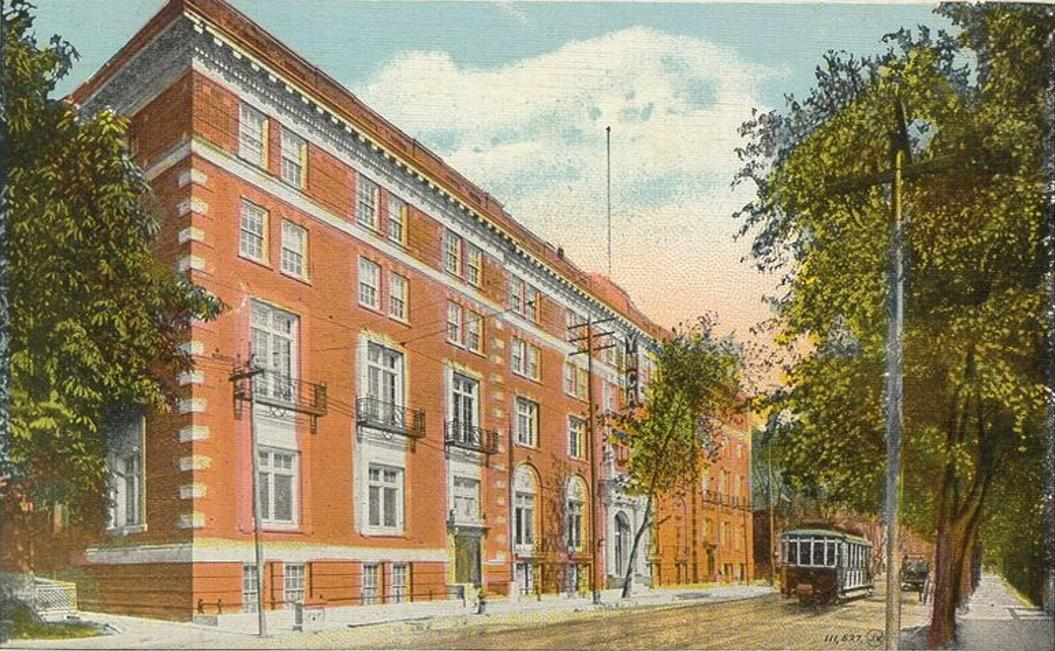
YMCA of downtown Toronto, c. 1923

The YMCA of Greater Toronto is a charity organization working on social issues in the Greater Toronto Area. In 2008 and 2009, YMCA of Greater Toronto in Canada was named one of Greater Toronto's Top Employers by Mediacorp Canada Inc.

== History ==
J. Howard Crocker served as the physical education director from 1899 to 1908, and led efforts to establish the YMCA Athletic League in 1904, which organized and promoted sport between YMCA associations.

David Griffin represented the Toronto Central YMCA in competing at the 1930 British Empire Games.

== YMCA Peace Medal ==
The YMCA Peace Medal program recognizes individuals who are dedicated to building peace within their local community or other communities around the world. The YMCA of Greater Toronto presents the peace medals to individuals each year during YMCA Peace Week. In 2018, the first President's Peace Medal was presented to professional basketball executive Masai Ujiri.

=== Recipients ===
- 1998: Angelina Martz – Humanitarian aid worker and nun
- 1999: Gerhard Scholten – Activist with Council of Canadians
- 2000: David Niles and Fernand Landry – Founders of Canadian Aid for Chernobyl
- 2017: Wali Shah – Poet Laureate for the city of Mississauga
- 2017: Stronger Communities – youth-run community organization.
- 2018: Masai Ujiri – Toronto Raptors president of basketball operations
- 2018: Dale Swift – Toronto Police Service constable
- 2018: Loizza Aquino – mental health activist and founder of Peace of Mind Canada and co-founder of Student Mental Health Canada
