= Leahurst College High School =

Location
- 109 - 4 Cataraqui St; Kingston, Ontario, K7L 1Z7; Canada; 44.24198°N 76.48076°W

Information
- School type: Secondary
- Motto: Aeternum Excellere ("Ever to excel")
- Founded: 2013
- Principal: Elizabeth Turcke
- Grades: 6–12
- Language: English and French
- Colours: Navy, burgundy, and gold
- Website: www.leahurstcollege.ca

Leahurst College High School is a Grade 5–12 independent school located in Kingston, Ontario, Canada. The school was established in 2013 and began its first year during the 2013-2014 academic year. Founded by current Head of School Elizabeth Turcke, the school took over the old Ministry of Health Offices in the Woollen Mill Building on Cataraqui St.

== Athletics ==
Leahurst College is seeking inclusion in the Kingston Area Secondary Schools Athletic Association (KASSAA), Eastern Ontario Secondary School Athletic Association (EOSSAA), and by extension the Ontario Federation of School Athletic Associations (OFSAA). This will allow the school to compete against other high schools in recognized competitions.

== Crest ==
The Leahurst crest consists of the images representing the four houses of the school as well as the school's motto: "Aeternum Excellere" meaning ever to excel. The four houses are: Sentience, Creativity, Flow, and Potential.
