= W. F. Herman =

Canadian newspaper publisher

- Born: Lunenburg, Nova Scotia, Canada
- Died: January 15, 1938; Los Angeles, California, USA
- Occupation: Publisher
- Spouse: Adie Knox Herman
- Children: Ruth Knox Herman

W.F. Herman (died 1938) was a Canadian newspaper publisher. He was the owner and publisher of the Windsor Star from 1918 until his death.

== Biography ==
Herman was the son of a sea captain. His first job was at a weekly newspaper, where he discovered his passion for the newspaper business.

In the early 1900s, Herman went to Boston, Massachusetts, seeking better employment opportunities. He met and married Adie Knox. In Boston their only daughter, Ruth, was born. (Ruth died in 1920.)

Moving back to Canada in 1911, the Hermans settled in Saskatoon. For a short time in 1911, Herman owned the Prince Albert Herald. He switched it from a weekly to a daily newspaper, and then sold the journal back to its original owners.

In 1912, Herman and his partner Talmage Lawson bought another local daily, The Saskatoon Capital. They changed its name to The Saskatoon Daily Star, and Herman became editor. During this period, Herman also owned The Regina Evening Post.

In 1918, W.F. Herman came to Windsor, Ontario, and purchased The Record newspaper, changing its name to The Border City Star.

Upon the amalgamation of Windsor, Walkerville, Sandwich, and East Windsor in 1935, the name of the newspaper changed to The Windsor Star.

== Death ==
Herman came to Southern California in late 1937, and died in Los Angeles on January 15, 1938, after a surgical procedure. He left behind a legacy of hard work and a reputation for strong will and determination.

The day he died, his own newspaper supplied the most fitting epitaph:

He never sought personal glory and he disliked ostentation. His tastes were simple and his manner of living plain. He wanted to be a good citizen and a good newspaperman. He was both.

== Honors ==
Herman demonstrated a keen interest in education; he believed that giving young people a good educational background would help them meet and cope with the challenges of the world. It was also his opinion that a sound educational system was a worthwhile investment in progress. In recognition of his lifelong interest in education, in 1958 the Windsor Board of Education named W. F. Herman Collegiate Institute after him. (The school has been subsequently renamed the W. F. Herman Academy.)
