= Wali Shah =

Canadian poet

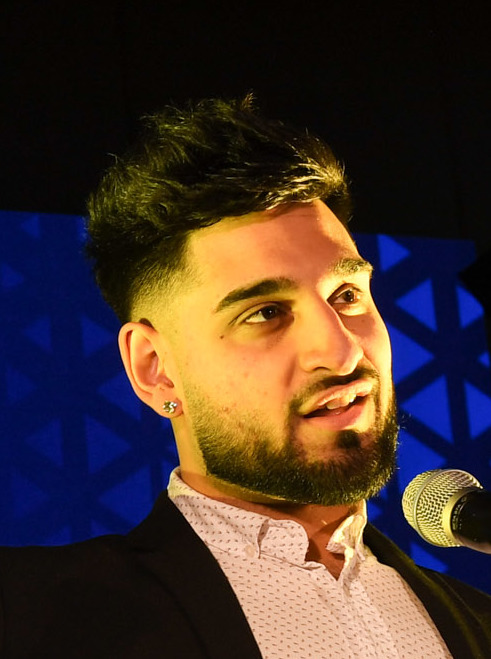
- Shah at the 2019 CFC Annual Gala & Auction
- Born: Wali Shah; September 9, 1994 (age 32); Pakistan
- Education: University of Toronto (BA)
- Occupations: Speaker; Spoken Word Poet
- Years active: 2013 – Present
- Website: https://www.lifeaswali.com/

Wali Shah (born September 9, 1994) is a Canadian speaker, poet, musician and philanthropist. He has spoken most prominently on topics including bullying, mental health and social change, while creating spoken word poetry specifically tailored to his projects and engagements.

In 2014, he was named by Plan Canada as one of Canada's "Top 20 Under 20". He served as the Poet Laureate for the city of Mississauga from 2017 - 2019. In 2019, he was one of the recipients of the 2019 Top 25 Canadian Immigrant Awards presented by Canadian Immigrant Magazine.

== Early years ==
Shah's Muslim parents immigrated from Pakistan to Canada in 1997 when Shah was three, first settling in Toronto before moving to Mississauga, Ontario. As a result, Shah spent a number of years of his youth in Toronto before settling in Mississauga. Shah attended Cawthra Park Secondary School, his early years being turbulent and culminating in his arrest at the age of 15. This served as a turning point in Shah's life at which point through mentorship and resilience he changed his lifestyle towards facilitating change in the community. In June 2018, Shah received an Honours Bachelor's degree in Sociology and Political Science from the University of Toronto's Mississauga campus.

== Career ==
In 2013 Shah released his first project, Rhythm & Poetry. The album spawned the single "King of the Castle" which addressed bullying as a social issue. The song's music video was used by the Peel Region District School Board, and had over 100,000 views on YouTube. It was shown on MTV for WeDay 2014. Following this, Shah collaborated with the Peel Board to create a bullying prevention video titled "Change The World".

On October 2, 2014, Shah was featured alongside actress-musician Selena Gomez at the 2014 We Day conference where he also freestyled with musical artist Kendrick Lamar. His music video "King of the Castle" was featured at the event and would go on to air on MTV Canada.

In 2015, Shah was awarded the 3M National Student Fellowship which is presented annually to 10 student leaders across the country.

In 2016, Shah was featured in Maclean's as one of the "new school of social media influencers who have figured out how to capitalize on their online, and real-world, popularity." That same year, Microsoft approached Shah to create and perform a spoken word poem for its World Partner Conference in August 2016 at the Air Canada Centre in Toronto.

In 2017, Shah was made a local ambassador of the World YMCA organization and received the YMCA Peace Medal from the Greater Toronto chapter. Other peace medal honourees have included professional basketball executive Masai Ujiri and mental health activist Loizza Aquino.

Later in 2017, Joggo Bags collaborated with Shah, Loizza Aquino, and Diana Smendra to launch the JOGGO Purpose Backpack, a custom item with a portion of proceeds supporting Canadian charitable organization, CARE Canada.

Shah is also an ambassador for organizations such as Crime Stoppers International, Bell Let's Talk, and United Way for which he has raised over one million dollars.

On March 30, 2018, Shah was selected as District 86 Toastmasters Communication and Leadership (C&L) award recipient

In early 2019, Shah joined the board of directors for Canadian non-profit organization Peace of Mind Canada.

On August 7, 2019, Shah spoke at the Canada's Walk of Fame induction ceremony for Olympic skating champions Tessa Virtue and Scott Moir.

In 2019, Shah spoke at the annual WE Day Toronto event hosted by WE Charity (formerly Free The Children) at the Scotiabank Arena in Toronto, Ontario. He was later added to the lineup for other WE Day events in Canada, including Alberta, Vancouver, and Atlantic Canada (Halifax, Nova Scotia).
