= Kajiura =

Kajiura (written: 梶浦) is a Japanese surname. Notable people with the surname include:

- Chie Kajiura (チエ・カジウラ), Japanese singer
- Hirotaka Kajiura (梶浦 宏孝, born 1995), Japanese shogi player
- Jason Kajiura, Canadian middle-distance runner and physiologist
- Yuki Kajiura (梶浦 由記, born 1965), Japanese composer and music producer
