= CANUSA Games =

Annual contest between Flint, Michigan, and Hamilton, Ontario

The CANUSA Games are an annual contest, primarily for athletes age 18 and under, between the sister cities of Hamilton, Ontario, Canada, and Flint, Michigan, United States. The Games are the longest-running amateur sports competition in North America. The games are held in alternate locations, with Hamilton, Ontario, hosting in odd-numbered years.

== History ==
As a result of the Flint Olympian Games held in Flint, Michigan, in July 1957, the Flint officials of the Games wanted a city, of similar size and population, to compete with on a yearly basis. Hamilton was selected, which birthed the "CANUSA" games, whose name was derived from combining the names Canada and United States - CAN/USA.

The Games began in August 1958, and consisted of 200 athletes (from each city) competing in seven different sports. The Games have grown considerably, which is supported by the more than 1,600 athletes from each city competing in 17 different competitive sports, including basketball, baseball, softball, volleyball, darts, golf, track and field, swimming and ice hockey. An estimated 25,000 people have participated in the games in their 50 years.

== Opening ceremonies ==
Departing the night before from the visiting city, relay runners carry the torch over the border, covering a distance of 245 miles between Flint and Hamilton. The torch is run into the venue in which the opening ceremonies are held, which represents the official start of the Games.

To symbolize the relationship between the sister cities, the national anthems (from both nations) are sung by everyone present at the Opening Ceremonies. The Friendship Trophy is also given by the Mayor of the host city to the Mayor of the visiting city as a symbol of friendship and peace. The Games take the true meaning of friendship to task as each year the visiting country's athletes "billet" or reside with their counterparts during the entire weekend beyond competition. It is considered the signature of the Game's existence.

Journalist Ivan Miller of the Hamilton Spectator wrote the games' code of ethics and athletes' oath in 1959.

== Editions ==
Edition	Host	Notes
1957	Flint, Michigan, USA	The Flint Olympian Games, a prelude to the first CANUSA Games
1958	Flint, Michigan, USA	The first CANUSA Games
1959	Hamilton, Ontario, Canada	The First CANUSA Games held in Hamilton
1960	Flint, Michigan, USA	The first Harold Webster Trophy was awarded (Track & Field)
1961	Hamilton, Ontario, Canada	
1962	Flint, Michigan, USA	
1963	Hamilton, Ontario, Canada	
1964	Flint, Michigan, USA	
1965	Hamilton, Ontario, Canada	
1966	Flint, Michigan, USA	The first Jimmy Thompson Memorial Award Trophy was awarded (swimming)
1967	Hamilton, Ontario, Canada	
1968	Flint, Michigan, USA	The first Bernie Arbour Memorial Trophy was awarded (baseball)
1969	Hamilton, Ontario, Canada	The first Ivan Miller Award was awarded (volunteer)
1970	Flint, Michigan, USA	
1971	Hamilton, Ontario, Canada	
1972	Flint, Michigan, USA	
1973	Hamilton, Ontario, Canada	
1974	Flint, Michigan, USA	
1975	Hamilton, Ontario, Canada	
1976	Flint, Michigan, USA	
1977	Hamilton, Ontario, Canada	
1978	Flint, Michigan, USA	
1979	Hamilton, Ontario, Canada	
1980	Flint, Michigan, USA	
1981	Hamilton, Ontario, Canada	
1982	Flint, Michigan, USA	
1983	Hamilton, Ontario, Canada	
1984	Flint, Michigan, USA	
1985	Hamilton, Ontario, Canada	
1986	Flint, Michigan, USA	
1987	Hamilton, Ontario, Canada	
1988	Flint, Michigan, USA	
1989	Hamilton, Ontario, Canada	
1990	Flint, Michigan, USA	
1991	Hamilton, Ontario, Canada	
1992	Flint, Michigan, USA	
1993	Hamilton, Ontario, Canada	
1994	Flint, Michigan, USA	The Games' first paid Business Administrator
1995	Hamilton, Ontario, Canada	
1996	Flint, Michigan, USA	The first W. Clarence Willson Memorial Trophy was awarded (girls basketball)
1997	Hamilton, Ontario, Canada	
1998	Flint, Michigan, USA	
1999	Hamilton, Ontario, Canada	The first Marg Brokenshire Memorial Award was given (Hamilton person that "goes the extra mile")
2000	Flint, Michigan, USA	
2001	Hamilton, Ontario, Canada	
2002	Flint, Michigan, USA	
2003	Hamilton, Ontario, Canada	
2004	Flint, Michigan, USA	
2005	Hamilton, Ontario, Canada	
2006	Flint, Michigan, USA	
2007	Hamilton, Ontario, Canada	The first Bill Sturrup Memorial Trophies were awarded (golf)
2008	Flint, Michigan, USA	
2009	Hamilton, Ontario, Canada	
2010	Flint, Michigan, USA	
2011	Hamilton, Ontario, Canada	Flint wins its first road Games since 1959
2012	Flint, Michigan, USA	Flint wins third consecutive Games
2013	Hamilton, Ontario, Canada	
2014	Flint, Michigan, USA	
2015	Hamilton, Ontario, Canada	
2016	Hamilton, Ontario, Canada	Hosting duties taken over by Hamilton due to ongoing Flint water crisis.
2017	Flint, Michigan, USA	
2018	Hamilton, Ontario, Canada	
2019	Flint, Michigan, USA	
2020	cancelled	Cancelled due to the COVID-19 pandemic
2021	Hamilton, Ontario, Canada	
2022	Flint, Michigan, USA	
2023	Hamilton, Ontario, Canada	
2024	Flint, Michigan, USA	
