= Canadian Immigrant =

Canadian magazine and website

- Cover of Canadian Immigrant, Aug, 2010 issue.
- Categories: Canadian cultural magazine
- Frequency: Monthly
- Founder: Nick Noorani
- Founded: 2004
- Company: Metroland Media Group (Torstar)
- Country: Canada
- Based in: Toronto
- Language: English
- Website: www.canadianimmigrant.ca

Canadian Immigrant is a free magazine and daily website for recent arrivals to Canada. The properties are owned by Torstar, and are currently published by Metroland Media Group.

== History ==
Founded in 2004 by Naeem "Nick" Noorani, a social entrepreneur who immigrated to Canada in 1998 from Dubai, Canadian Immigrant aims at "informing, educating, motivating and connecting" immigrants across Canada. Noorani contemplated launching a magazine for immigrants following a layoff from his job as an advertising director for a technology company the same year. After successfully completing the Burnaby YMCA Self-Employment Program, Noorani started the magazine out of his home in North Vancouver, British Columbia with some funding, several suppliers, an editor, an art director and himself selling the advertising. On April 28, 2004, the first issue was launched with MP Ujjal Dosanjh and Harmony Airways' David Ho on the cover. Subsequent issues have since been published each month, featuring successful immigrant bios; columns from specialists in areas such as banking, immigration law and real estate; and stories of personal triumph. In 2005, Minto Roy became an ownership partner of the Canadian Immigrant Magazine.

In 2006, Noorani and Roy approached the owners of Torstar in the hopes that the later could take Canadian Immigrant national. By November of that year, the Star Media Group, a division of Torstar, was convinced of the idea and took over the magazine. A Toronto edition launched in March, 2007. Noorani retained the role of publisher but stepped down in August 2010; the co-publishers are now Gautam Sharma and Sanjay Agnihotri. The magazine is published six times a year in print and online. The magazine also hosts the Canadian Immigrant Fair in cities across Canada.

== Canada's Top 25 Canadian Immigrants Award ==
Canadian Immigrant is also known for developing and launching the annual Canada's Top 25 Immigrants program (previously referred to as the RBC Top 25 Canadian Immigrant Awards). The program takes place online, and nominations are open to all Canadians. The program has three phases: nominations, voting, and winners announcements. The winners are featured online and in a special issue each year. First launched by Canadian Immigrant in 2009, this program strives to recognize "people who have come to and have made a positive difference living in Canada". The award is open to immigrants from all walks of life, be it a community advocate or volunteer, a successful entrepreneur or a cultural icon. At the start of each year, Canadian Immigrant invites nominations based on a variety of criteria, which range from contribution to community to professional accomplishments. A judging panel composed of, leaders who work within the immigrant or ethnic communities determine the shortlist on which the public vote.

Notable recipients of the award include Toronto Raptors 'Superfan' Nav Bhatia, VANOC CEO John Furlong, mental health activist Loizza Aquino, father of three professional ice hockey players Karl Subban, CBC News anchor Ian Hanomansing, and the 26th Governor-General of Canada, Adrienne Clarkson.
