= Russell F. Johannes =

American agronomist (1921–1976)

- Born: Russell Frederick Johannes; June 24, 1921; Wautoma, Wisconsin
- Died: January 26, 1976 (aged 54); Middleton, Wisconsin

Academic background
- Education: University of Wisconsin

Russell Frederick Johannes (June 24, 1921 – January 26, 1976) was an agricultural scientist based at the University of Wisconsin.

== History ==
Russell F. Johannes was born in Wautoma, Wisconsin. in 1921 and taught agricultural science at the University of Wisconsin. Russell F. Johannes was the primary organizer of the Marshfield Agricultural Research Station between Marshfield and Stratford, Wisconsin. As early as 1949, Johannes was the Superintendent of the Marshfield Agricultural Research Station and held this post for 27 years.

Johannes died in 1976. Following his death, the University of Wisconsin announced the Russell F. Johannes Scholarship Fund.

== Bibliography ==
- The Recipe For Sure-Fire Alfalfa (1957) -- Co-authored by Conrad C. Olsen
- The Wojta System of Land Surface Drainage (1960) -- Co-authored with Arthur E. Peterson and Frank V. Burcalow
- Alfalfa Cutting Practices (1962)
- Summer Forage: Stored Feeding, Green Feeding, and Strip Grazing (1965)
- A Comparison of Two Concentrates for Lactating Dairy Cattle (1969)
- A Comparison of Haylage and Wilted Grass Silage Plus Hay in the Dairy Cow Diet (1971)
- Forage Crop Varieties and Seeding Mixtures (1973)
- Effect of Snowmobile Traffic on Non-forest Vegetation (1973)
