= George Redding =

Canadian ice hockey player (1900–1974)

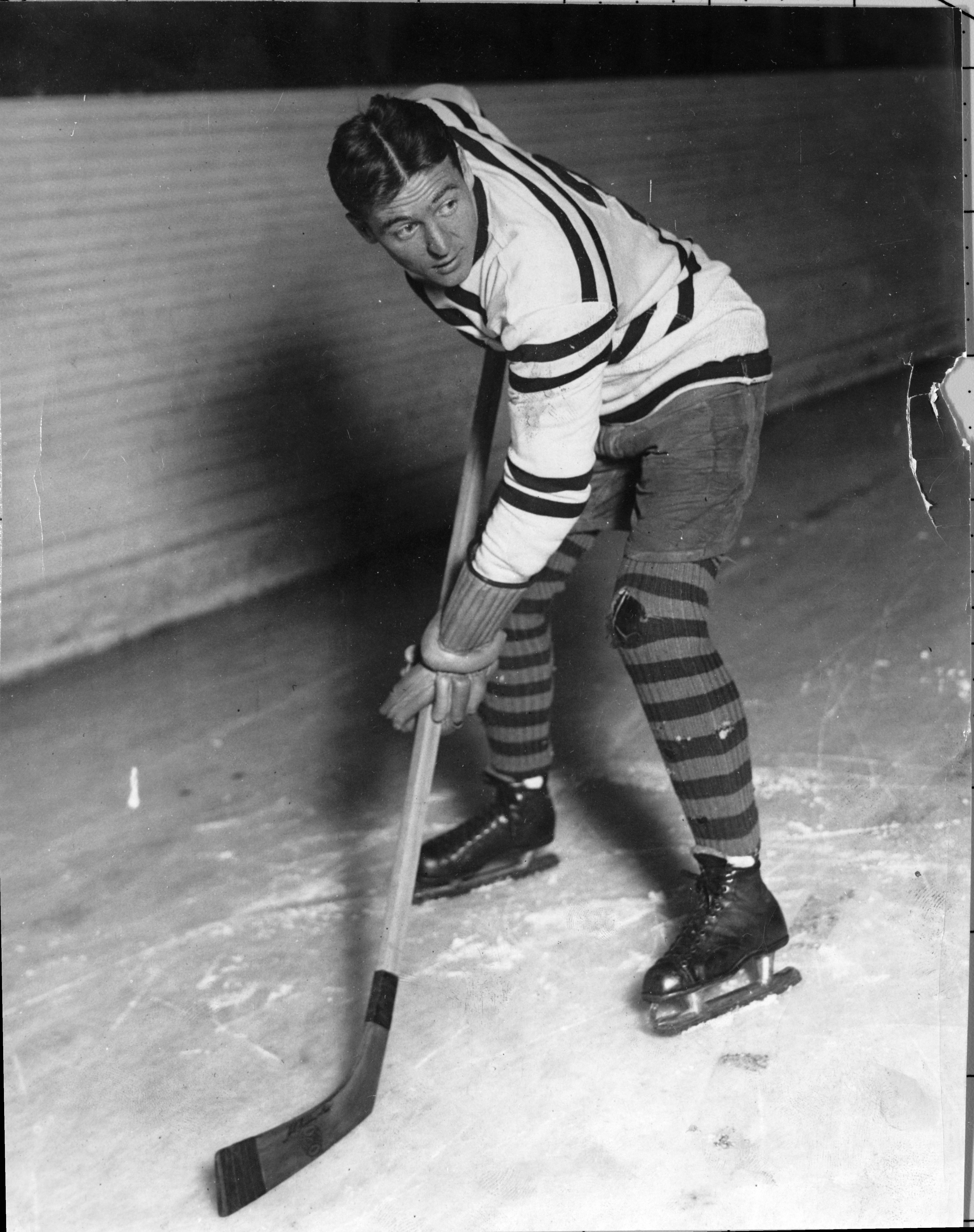
- Born: March 6, 1900 Peterborough, Ontario, Canada
- Died: October 17, 1974 (aged 74)
- Height: 5 ft 7 in (170 cm)
- Weight: 145 lb (66 kg; 10 st 5 lb)
- Position: Left wing
- Shot: Left
- Played for: Boston Bruins; Chicago Black Hawks; Detroit Red Wings
- Playing career: 1921–1932

George Redding (March 6, 1900 – October 17, 1974) was a Canadian professional ice hockey left wing. He played 33 games for the Boston Bruins of the National Hockey League over two seasons, 1924–25 and 1925–26. The rest of his career, which lasted from 1921 to 1932, was spent in different minor leagues.

== Playing career ==
Redding once filled in as the Bruins goaltender when regular netminder Hec Fowler was injured during a game against the Toronto St. Pats. He allowed 1 goal in 10 minutes of play to give him a career GAA of 5.45. Redding played a total of 33 career NHL games at his regular left wing position.

== Coaching career ==
Redding coached the Hamilton Tigers in the OHA Senior A League, and credited journalist Ivan Miller for originating the "Tattered Tigers" nickname in 1945, referring to old uniforms worn by the team on route to reaching the 1946 Allan Cup finals.

== Career statistics ==
=== Regular season and playoffs ===
			Regular season					Playoffs
Season	Team	League	GP	G	A	Pts	PIM	GP	G	A	Pts	PIM
1921–22	Hamilton Tigers	OHA Sr	10	1	4	5	—	—	—	—	—	—
1922–23	Hamilton Tigers	OHA Sr	11	0	1	1	—	2	0	0	0	2
1923–24	Hamilton Tigers	OHA Sr	10	4	4	8	—	2	0	0	0	—
1924–25	Boston Bruins	NHL	27	3	2	5	10	—	—	—	—	—
1925–26	Boston Bruins	NHL	6	0	0	0	0	—	—	—	—	—
1926–27	Boston Tigers	Can-Am	31	7	0	7	39	—	—	—	—	—
1927–28	Boston Tigers	Can-Am	39	7	3	10	48	2	1	0	1	2
1928–29	London Panthers	Can-Pro	33	0	0	0	60	—	—	—	—	—
1929–30	Minneapolis Millers	AHA	47	4	3	7	64	—	—	—	—	—
1930–31	Minneapolis Millers	AHA	43	9	3	12	73	—	—	—	—	—
1931–32	Buffalo Majors	AHA	13	0	2	2	8	—	—	—	—	—
AHA totals			103	13	8	21	145	—	—	—	—	—
NHL totals			33	3	2	5	10	—	—	—	—	—
