= Philip Granville =

Canadian racewalker

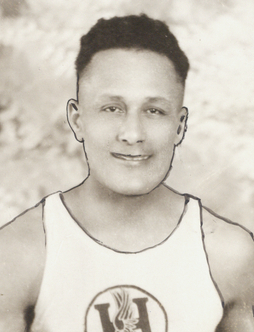

Personal information
- Nationality: Canadian
- Born: 28 July 1894 Kingston, Jamaica
- Died: 16 August 1954 (aged 60) Tooting, London, England

Sport
- Sport: Athletics
- Event: Racewalking

Philip Granville (28 July 1894 – 16 August 1954) was a Canadian racewalker. He competed in the men's 10 kilometres walk at the 1924 Summer Olympics. He was coached at the YMCA in Hamilton, Ontario, by Bobby Kerr, and was a teammate of David Griffin.
