= David Griffin (athlete) =

Canadian athlete and journalist (1905–1944)

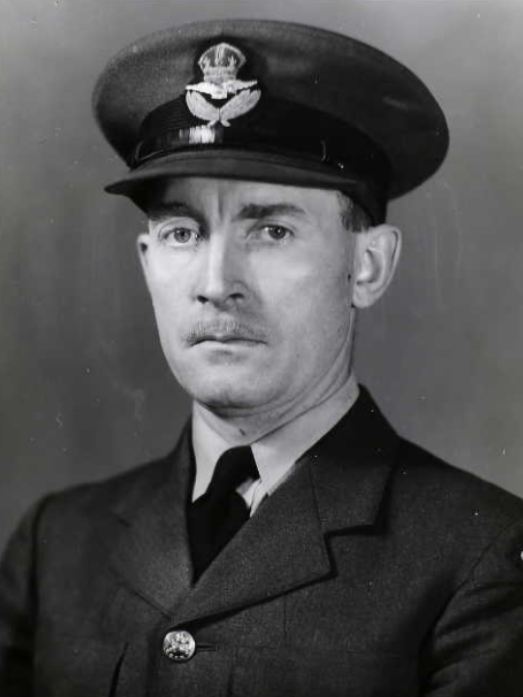
- Griffin c. 1943

Personal information
- Born: May 13, 1905 Hamilton, Ontario, Canada
- Died: February 18, 1944 (aged 38) Goose Bay, Dominion of Newfoundland
- Resting place: CFB Goose Bay Cemetery
- Occupation: Journalist
- Years active: 1926–1944
- Employers: The Hamilton Spectator; Toronto Star; Windsor Star; The Sudbury Star
- Military career
- Allegiance: Canada
- Branch: Royal Canadian Air Force
- Service years: 1943–1944
- Rank: Flying officer
- Known for: Public relations

Sport
- Country: Canada
- Sport: Middle-distance running
- Event: 1500 metres
- Club: Hamilton Olympic Club; Toronto Central YMCA; Hamilton YMCA

David Francis Griffin (May 13, 1905 – February 18, 1944) was a Canadian athlete and journalist. He represented Canada in the 1,500-metre event at the 1928 Summer Olympics, had a personal best time of 4:02, and was the national 1 mile (1.6 km) champion in 1927 and 1929. He won the 1,000 yd (910 m) indoor race twice in three years at the 91st Highlanders Athletic Association meet, setting a record time of 2:19, and shared a national record in the 2 mi (3.2 km) indoor medley relay with the Hamilton Olympic Club. Beginning his running career coached by Bobby Kerr at the YMCA in Hamilton, Griffin also represented Canada in the 1930 British Empire Games, and the Tailteann Games, the British Army Games, and the Scottish Games.

Starting in journalism as a press agent for his track and field club, Griffin later worked on the editorial staffs for the Hamilton Spectator, the Windsor Star, and the Toronto Star, and wrote for the Sudbury Star. He enlisted in the Royal Canadian Air Force (RCAF) in 1942, was promoted to the rank of flying officer, and handled RCAF public relations. Deployed to the Aleutian Islands, he provided the Canadian press with its limited information on RCAF operations in Alaska. Subsequently transferring to RCAF Eastern Air Command, he reported on events in Atlantic Canada and the Arctic, and died in a plane crash near CFB Goose Bay. His posthumously published book, First Steps to Tokyo, detailed Canadian and American joint efforts against the Empire of Japan culminating in the Battle of Kiska.

== Early life and family ==
David Francis Griffin was born on May 13, 1905, in Hamilton, Ontario. His parents, Francis Joseph and Alice Griffin, were Irish Canadians. He had two brothers and six sisters, attended St. Patrick Catholic Elementary School and later Hamilton Central Collegiate.

== Athletics career ==
=== Hamilton YMCA ===
While attending high school, Griffin ran international indoor track and field events at the 880 yd (800 m) distance, and was a teammate of Philip Granville and coached by Bobby Kerr at the Hamilton YMCA. In 1923, Griffin ran the Newmarket-to-Toronto relay race, and the four-mile Guelph relay races. In 1924, he placed third in both the 600 yd (550 m) and 1,000 yd (910 m) races of the Ontario indoor championships, and placed second in the 600 yd (550 m) race at the Ontario YMCA championships.

At the 1925 Ontario indoor championships, Griffin placed third in the 1,000 yd race, when the Hamilton YMCA track and field club won its third consecutive provincial indoor championship. Griffin also competed in 1 mi (1.6 km), and 5 mi (8.0 km) races during the indoor season. In April 1925, he was elected president of the Hamilton YMCA track and field club for one year. He won the 1 mi (1.6 km) race at the 1925 Caledonian Games in Hamilton, and represented the Hamilton YMCA in the 880 yd (800 m) and 1 mi (1.6 km) races at the Ontario outdoor track and field championships.

Named captain of the Hamilton YMCA track and field club in March 1926, Griffin placed third in the 1 mi (1.6 km) race at that year's Ontario indoor championships. He ran the third leg of both the 1 mi (1.6 km) and 2 mi (3.2 km) relay races won by his team at the Broadview Indoor Carnival. The event was the first time in which the Hamilton YMCA placed ahead of the Toronto Varsity Blues.

=== Hamilton Olympic Club ===
==== 1926 to 1928 ====
Griffin joined the Hamilton Olympic Club (HOC) in July 1926, coached by Captain J. R. Cornelius. At the 1926 Ontario track and field championships organized by the HOC Griffin placed third in the 880 yd (800 m) race. At the 1926 Canadian track and field championships in Fort William, Ontario, he competed in the 880 yd (800 m) finals and placed second in the 1 mi (1.6 km) event. In the same season, he won the 1 mi (1.6 km) invitational race at the Hamilton Police Service athletic games, and was one of four HOC athletes who competed in the inaugural Ontario decathlon championships.

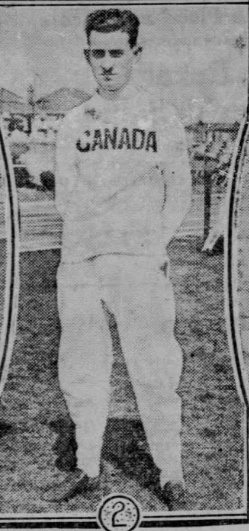
Griffin c. 1928

At the 1927 Ontario indoor championships, Griffin placed third in the 1,000 yd (910 m) event. At the national outdoor track and field championships and Olympic trials in 1927, Griffin won the 1 mi (1.6 km) race by 12 yards (11 m), which was reported as an upset at the time, and earning a medal from the Amateur Athletic Union of Canada as the Canadian champion. He ran the 1 mi (1.6 km) race at the Canadian National Exhibition (CNE) athletics meet later in the season, winning another national event and receiving a bronze trophy from the Canadian National Railway.

In relay racing in the season, Griffin ran the first leg for the HOC which set a national record time of 8:15.4 in the 2 mi (3.2 km) race. He later ran the sixth of ten 3 mi (4.8 km) legs for a HOC victory in the 30 mi (48 km) CNE relay event.

In the 1928 indoor track season, Griffin ran in the Wanamaker Mile at the Millrose Athletic Club indoor meet at Madison Square Garden, and ran the final leg of the international relay where his team placed third. At the 91st Highlanders Athletic Association meet, he won the 1,000 yd (910 m) in a record time of 2:19. He also won the 1 mi (1.6 km) race, and ran in the medley relay also won by the HOC.

Trying longer distances, Griffin placed second in the 5,000 m (16,000 ft) event at a Toronto road race. His HOC team placed first in the 2 mi (3.2 km) race at the Ontario relay championships, and he placed third in the 1 mi (1.6 km) race at the Ontario track and field championships. Early in 1928, he also competed in the 0.5 mi (0.80 km) event at the United States interscholastic track and field championships at Haverford College.

==== 1928 Summer Olympics ====
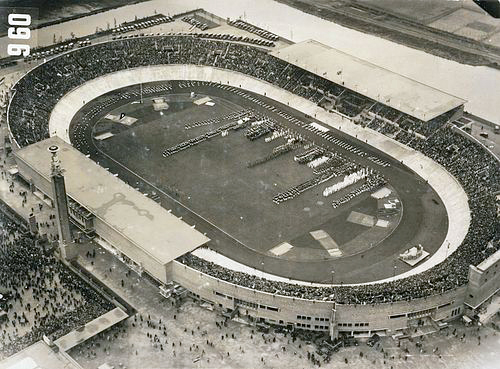
Olympic Stadium (Amsterdam) in 1928

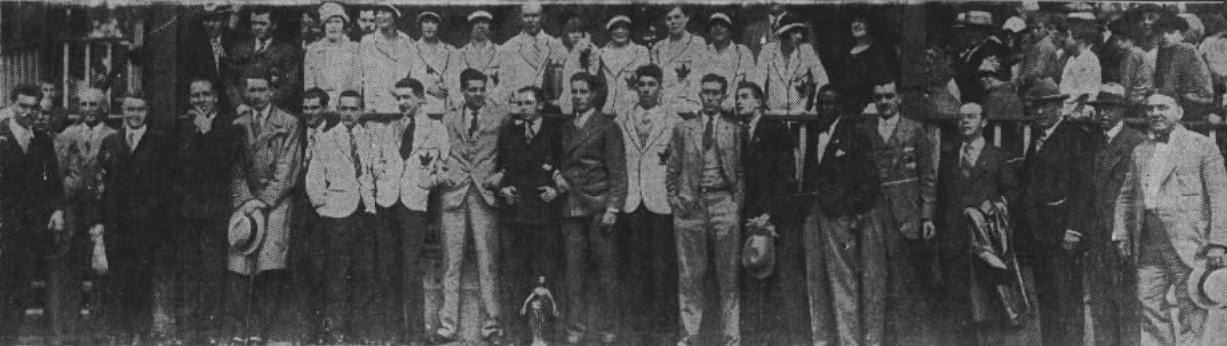
1928 Canadian Olympic team

Griffin placed third in the 1,500 m (4,900 ft) race of the Olympic trials hosted in Hamilton, and was chosen to represent Canada in the 1,500-metre event at the 1928 Summer Olympics. The Mail and Empire criticized the number of athletes on the Olympic team from Hamilton, noting that selection committee chairman Melville Marks Robinson, was a journalism colleague of Griffin. The choice of Griffin was defended by him meeting the Olympic standard of 4:09 for 1 mi (1.6 km), since he had a personal best time of 4:02.

Canada's track and field athletes departed Montreal on July 11, aboard SS Albertic bound for Amsterdam. Griffin placed fourth in his preliminary race after he fell during the final lap, when in second place at the time. He was eliminated from Olympics during the preliminary race, and had withdrawn from the 3,000 m (9,800 ft) steeplechase in favour of the 1,500 m (4,900 ft) event.

After the Olympics, Griffin participated in the 1 mi (1.6 km) races at the Tailteann Games in Ireland, the British Army Games in England, and the Scottish Games in Glasgow. Canadian athletes also participated in events at Paris and London, and sailed home aboard SS Doric, after winning the Wyoming Cup as a team in Scotland.

==== 1929 to 1930 ====
At the Canadian indoor championships, runners in the 1,000 yd (910 m) race ran an extra lap due to a mistake by event officials. Griffin was leading the race until the extra lap, when he was passed and placed second. He also ran the final leg of the medley relay won by the HOC. At the club championships for indoor track and field, Griffin was leading the 1,000 yd (910 m) race and on pace for a track record, when he fell on the final lap and did not finish.

Griffin was one of two people named to the HOC executive in 1929, to represent the athletes. He won the 1 mi (1.6 km) race at the Canadian championships, then missed several events after being injured in an automobile accident. A month later when HOC had a meet versus a combined team from the University of Oxford and the University of Cambridge, Griffin ran the 1 mi (1.6 km) race but finished poorly after keeping pace for the first half. He competed in the 1 mi (1.6 km) event at the Ontario track and field championships, but placed out of the medals. In the 1930 indoor season, Griffin won the 1,000 yd (910 m) race for the second time in three years at the 91st Highlanders Athletics Association meet.

=== Later career ===
Griffin competed for Canada in the 1 mi (1.6 km) race at the 1930 British Empire Games in Hamilton as a Toronto Central YMCA athlete. Later in the same season, he placed second in the 1 mi (1.6 km) race at the Royal Canadian Legion track and field meet, but collapsed after leading in the steeplechase event at the Canadian track and field championships. After the completing the indoor track and field season with the Toronto Central YMCA, he attempted a comeback with the HOC in 1931. His final race was a third-place finish at a 1 mi (1.6 km) HOC event in 1932.

== Journalism career ==
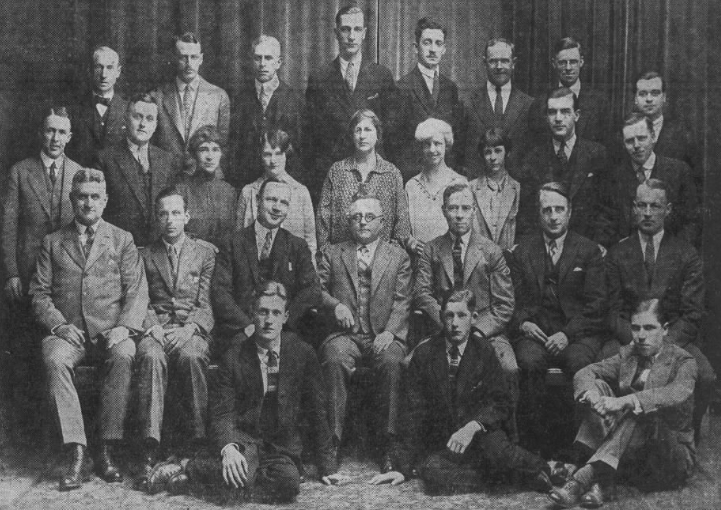
The Hamilton Spectator journalists in 1926 (Griffin, back row fourth from right)

In 1924, Griffin was named a press agent of the Hamilton YMCA track and field club. He began in journalism with the Hamilton Spectator, where he was on the reporting staff as of 1926, and a colleague of Melville Marks Robinson and Ivan Miller. Griffin was the newspaper's reporter for track and field events in which he participated. He was later on the Hamilton Spectator editorial staff, wrote for the Sudbury Star, and was briefly on the Windsor Star editorial staff c. 1932.

As the assistant city editor of the Toronto Star, Griffin's colleagues knew him as a "story teller", and referred to him as "lucky" since "no matter what happened, he seemed to come out on top". His writing topics included Canadian society, biographical pieces, politics, and the Government of Canada. When the House of Commons of Canada debated the need for a Ministry of Amateur Sport, Griffin wrote an op-ed on selection of athletes by Canadian Olympic Committee and its president, P. J. Mulqueen.

== Military service and death ==
Griffin enlisted in the Royal Canadian Air Force (RCAF) special reserve on November 12, 1942. He had a brother in the RCAF, a brother in the Canadian Army, and was previously a reservist with the Irish Regiment of Canada. Griffin was assigned service number C/24863, and promoted to the rank of flying officer. He became an RCAF public relations officer in March 1943, and served in Ottawa, Halifax, and the Aleutian Islands. Deployed to the Kiska shortly before the Empire of Japan withdrew its forces, Griffin provided the Canadian press with its limited information on RCAF operations in Alaska. He subsequently transferred to RCAF Eastern Air Command based in Halifax, reporting on events in Atlantic Canada and the Arctic.

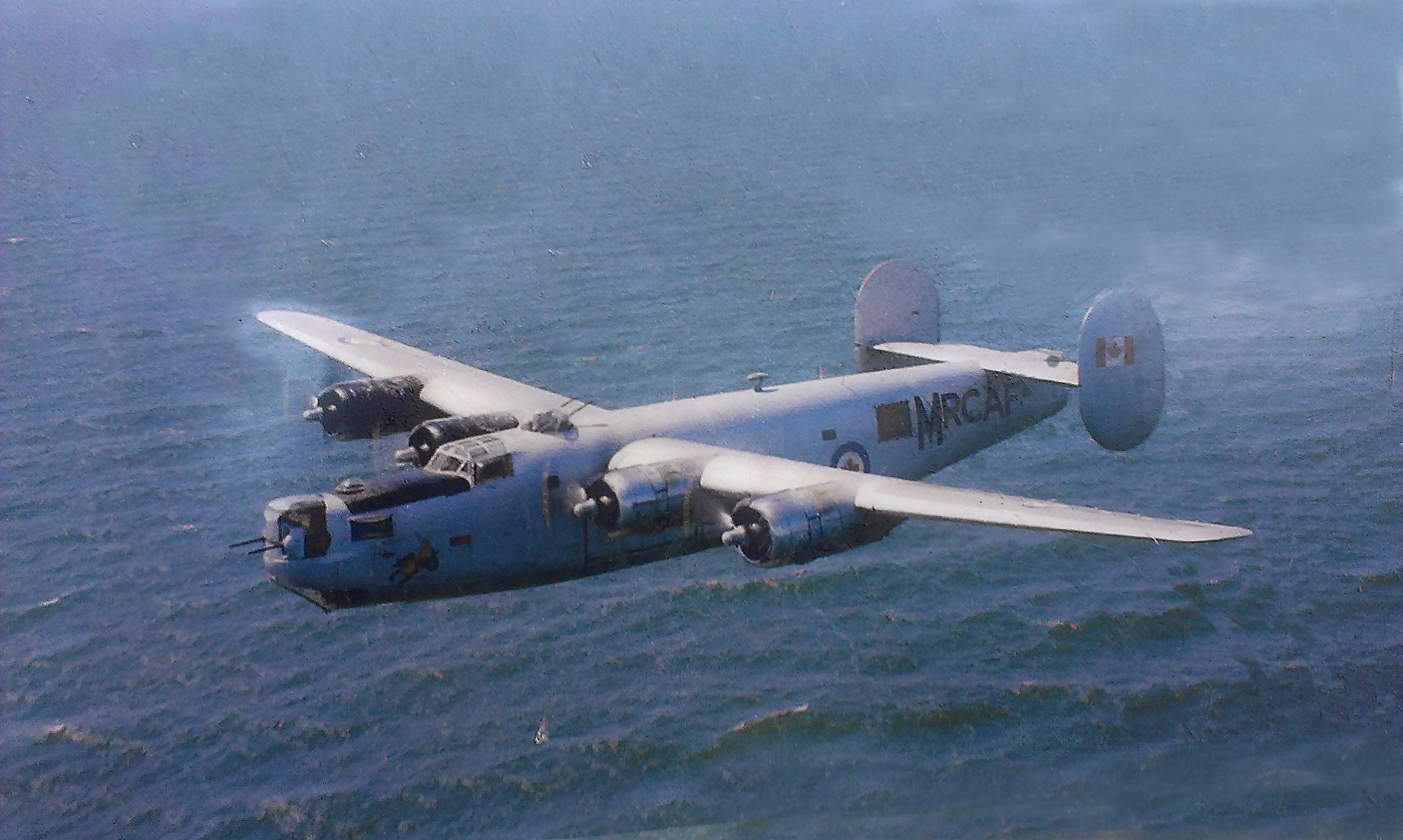
An RCAF Liberator, c. 1943

Griffin died in a plane crash on February 18, 1944, near Goose Bay, Dominion of Newfoundland, the only casualty aboard a Liberator bomber on a ferry flight from Iceland to CFB Goose Bay in foggy conditions. (Note: Griffin died on February 18, 1944, near Goose Bay, Newfoundland.: He was a passenger aboard a Liberator bomber.; He was a passenger on ferry flight from Iceland to Newfoundland.; The plane carrying him crashed attempting to land at CFB Goose Bay in foggy conditions.) Piloted by A. I. Imrie, both of the plane's starboard engines failed, and there was no radio contact due to ice and snow static. Despite being only six minutes from their destination, Imrie attempted landing in trees since lakes were not an option during the spring melt. On descent, the plane lilted to the right and spun when it struck a tree. The plane's tail then struck another tree, ejecting Griffin. When the crew located him, he was "beyond help".

Eastern Air Command searched for the plane thought downed in the Atlantic Ocean. A United States Army plane located the wreck. The five survivors were rescued on March 6, 1944. Griffin's body was recovered by a dog sled team of the United States Air Force, and taken to CFB Goose Bay for burial in a flag-draped casket by the survivors of the crash. He was interred in the Goose Bay Joint Services Cemetery.

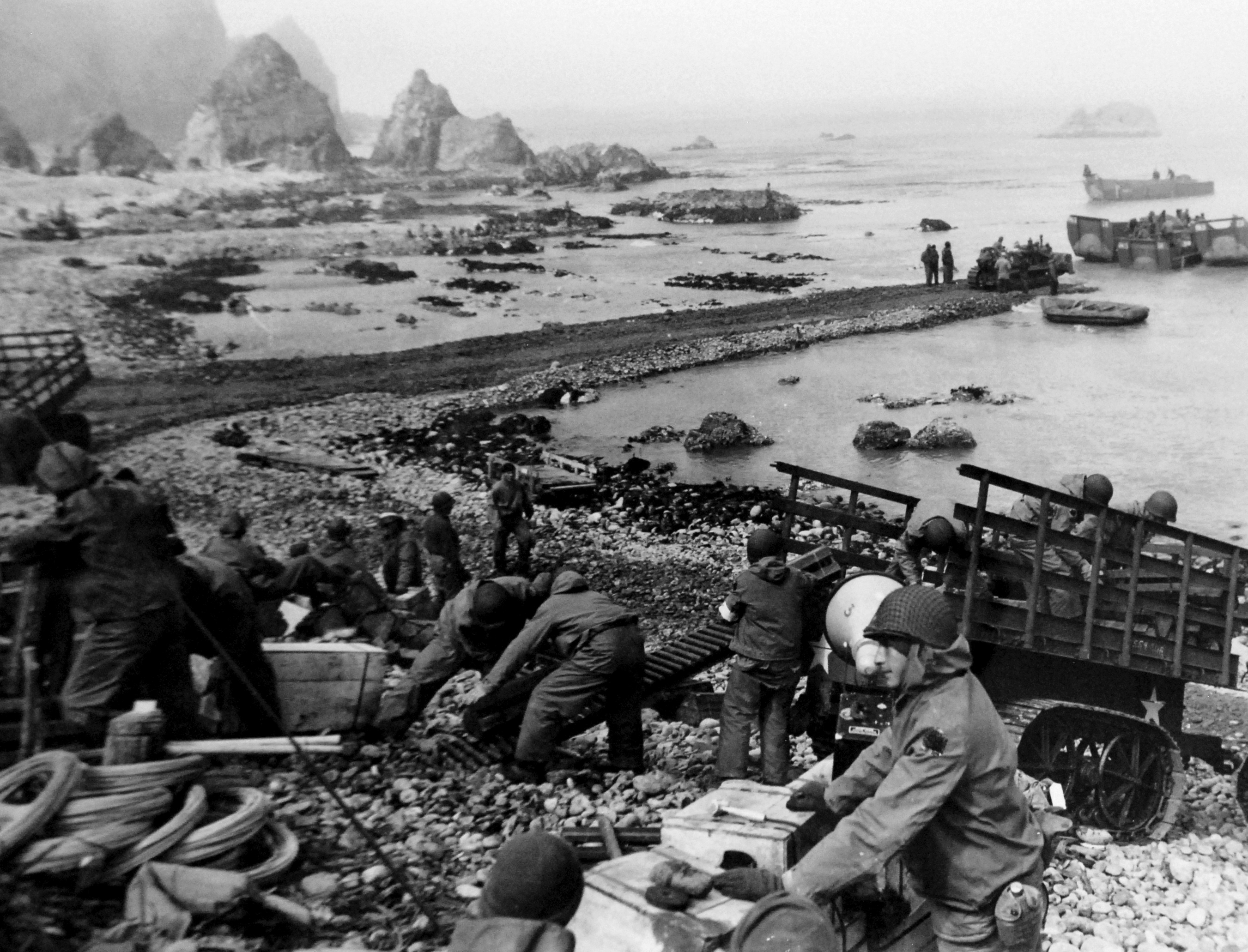
Allied landing at Kiska, August 1943

Griffin's book, First Steps to Tokyo, was posthumously published in April 1944. It detailed Canadian and American joint efforts to prevent Japan from using the Aleutian Islands to threaten the Pacific coast of North America, which culminated in the Battle of Kiska. He wrote that the RCAF was the last to attack the Japanese in three missions on July 26, 1943, bombing a landing strip before the Japanese departure. His book told of hardships endured by Canadians, the unpredictable weather, and their recreational time skiing and salmon fishing.

In November 1946, Griffin was one of 18 Toronto journalists commemorated on a plaque at the Toronto Press Club for those who died during the Second World War. He was also one of 27 Canadians listed in a Second World War book of honour at the London Press Club, commemorating British Empire journalists. His name appears on page 322 of the Canadian Second World War Book of Remembrance.

== Marriage and personal life ==
Griffin was Catholic, and fished as recreation with his newspaper colleagues. In 1942, he was vice-president of the Ulster Assistance Association in Toronto, to benefit servicemen in Belfast. He was married to Margaret Lenore Griffin (née Ott). They were wed approximately 18 months upon his death. He wrote from Iceland to his wife shortly before the fatal flight, about gifts he was bringing home from Europe to her. He had at least two brothers who also served in the military.
