= Northern Ontario Secondary Schools Athletics =

Canadian governing body

The Northern Ontario Secondary Schools Athletics (NOSSA) is the governing body for all secondary-school athletic competition in Greater Sudbury, North Bay, Sault Ste. Marie and the North Shore.

== Mandate ==
The NOSSA mandate is to establish a closer relationship among the member schools of the Association and to encourage and promote sound interscholastic athletic competition among the students of the secondary schools of the member districts.

== Representation ==
NOSSA champions typically represent the region of northeastern Ontario in Ontario Federation of School Athletic Associations (OFSAA) competitions.

== History ==
The first NOSSA Championship was in 1923, when North Bay Collegiate was crowned NOSSA football champions.

== Progression ==
- School wins SDSSAA championship: Advances to NOSSA
- School wins NOSSA championship: Advances to OFSAA
