= Ivan Miller (journalist) =

Canadian journalist and sportscaster (1898–1967)

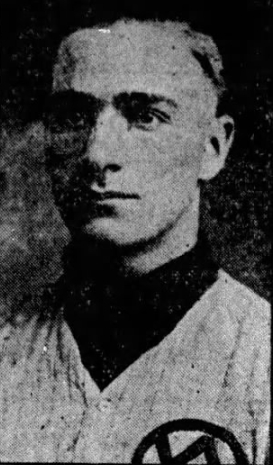
- Miller in 1920
- Born: December 31, 1898; Hamilton, Ontario, Canada
- Died: June 2, 1967 (aged 68); Hamilton, Ontario, Canada
- Occupations: Journalist and sportscaster
- Years active: 1922–1967
- Employer: The Hamilton Spectator
- Awards: Canadian Football Hall of Fame (1979)

James Ivan Miller (December 31, 1898 – June 2, 1967) was a Canadian journalist and sportscaster, who worked for The Hamilton Spectator for 45 years combined as a columnist, sports editor, and sports director. He regularly covered the Hamilton Tiger-Cats and Canadian football, and gave play-by-play coverage of golf and ice hockey as a radio sportscaster on CKOC. As the founding president of the Ontario Sportswriters and Sportscasters Association, he organized annual sports celebrities dinners to benefit the Ontario Society for Crippled Children. His final project was a book on the history of sports in Hamilton. He was posthumously inducted into the media section of the Canadian Football Hall of Fame, and the builder category of the Hamilton Sports Hall of Fame.

Before journalism, Miller played amateur baseball as a pitcher and won the 1920 Ontario Baseball Association championship. Hoping to turn professional with the Buffalo Bisons of the International League, an injury pitching for the Portsmouth Truckers in the Virginia League prevented his minor league progress after one season. He remained active in organizing sports in Hamilton, including golf and curling, was a committee member for the 1930 British Empire Games, and was the Canadian Football Hall of Fame's inaugural curator.

== Early life and baseball ==
James Ivan Miller was born on December 31, 1898, in Hamilton, Ontario, to parents James Miller and Mary Rosanna Storey. His father was born in England, and immigrated to Canada. In early life, Miller played multiple sports at the YMCA, including basketball, football, hockey, and soccer.

Miller was a right-handed pitcher, stood 6 feet 4 inches (1.93 m) tall, and weighed 225 pounds (102 kg). He began playing amateur baseball in Hamilton, for the Bayviews in 1917. He was undefeated pitching for the Bayviews in the 1918 season, then pitched for the Westinghouse team in the 1919 season. Despite being a pitcher, Miller was a hard-hitting batter and near the top of the league in batting average during the 1920 season. His only loss in the 1920 season with the Plowites came in an 11-inning game due to fielding errors, on route to winning the Ontario Baseball Association. While in Hamilton, Miller was nicknamed Ivan "the Terrible".

Planning to join the Buffalo Bisons of the International League for spring training, Miller hoped to turn professional in the 1921 season. After the Plowites were assured of winning the 1921 city championship, Miller signed a professional contract in July. Buffalo's manager Hooks Wiltse assigned Miller to the Portsmouth Truckers in the Virginia League, since Buffalo had ample pitching at the time. Reporting to Portsmouth's player-manager Jim Viox, Miller wrote that he was welcomed with open arms, and won his first game, giving up only five infield hits and striking out ten batters. In five games with Portsmouth, Miller had two wins and one loss, and pitched 31 innings. Portsmouth turned Miller back to Buffalo late in August, and he returned to Hamilton due to an injury while pitching. Reported at the time as being a sore arm, it was later described as a back injury that stopped his minor league progress. (Note: The injury was reported as a sore arm in 1923. Memorials about Miller in 1967 wrote that a back injury ended his minor league career.)

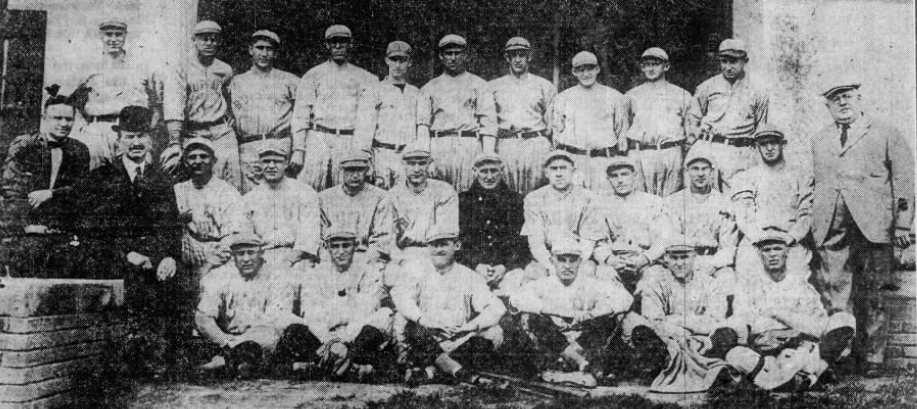
Miller with the Buffalo Bisons at spring training in 1922

Miller was on the 1922 spring training roster for the Bisons, in Gastonia, North Carolina. He was sent home early in April, for assignment to a farm team since Buffalo had ample pitching. He reported to the Brantford Brants in the Michigan–Ontario League, but was released after a try out. He joined the Port Huron Saints in May, where he pitched briefly before his release. He unsuccessfully tried out with the Hamilton Tigers in the Michigan–Ontario League, then finished the season pitching for Watford in the Lambton County Baseball League.

Not recovering from his injury until late in 1922, Miller turned down an offer from the Hamilton Tigers in August. He later pitched for the Hamilton Tigers in the 1923 Michigan–Ontario League season, and the Hamilton Clippers in the 1924 Michigan–Ontario League season.

After his playing career, Miller worked regularly as an umpire for the 1929 and 1930 amateur baseball seasons in Hamilton.

== Journalism and broadcasting ==
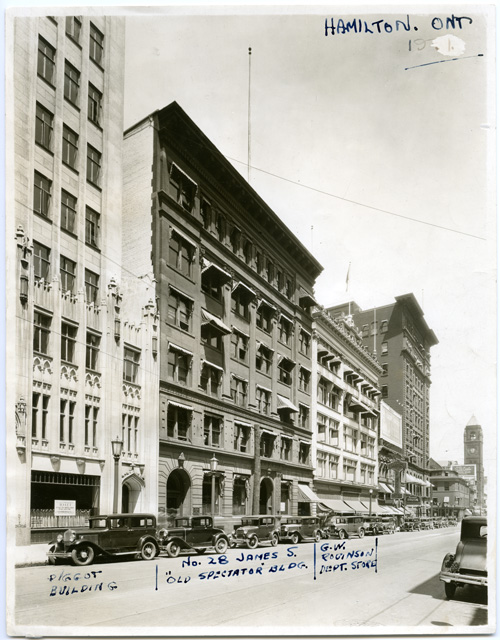
Miller worked at The Hamilton Spectator building (depicted c. 1931).

Miller began working for The Hamilton Spectator in 1922, became the sports editor in 1944, then the sports director in 1958. He started in beat reporting on the Hamilton Police Service, before he was the newspaper's third sports editor. His recurring columns included "The Sport Trial", and "Listening In On Sports Broadcast". He regularly covered the Hamilton Tiger-Cats and Canadian football, including columns and articles for the amateur, semi-professional, and professional eras of the game. His other frequent subjects were baseball, curling, golf, ice hockey, rowing, and track and field; and events including the Grey Cup, the World Series, and the Indianapolis 500. (Note: Miller regularly covered baseball, hockey, rowing, and international track and field. Miller reported on curling and golf. Miller covered the Grey Cup, the World Series, and the Indianapolis 500.)

Licences for private commercial radio stations in Canada were first granted in 1922, when Hamilton's CKOC began broadcasting. From the rolling hills of Ancaster in 1923, Miller broadcast on CKOC the first play-by-play report on a golf tournament in Canada, by using a system of flag semaphore from boy scouts at each hole. (Note: Information on the golf broadcast is compiled from these quoted sources: "Miller employed a flag system of communication with local boy scouts to provide play-by-play of the first golf broadcast by CKOC in 1923".; "From the rolling hills of Ancaster, Miller gave the first play-by-play report on a golf tournament in Canada, using a flag system by local boy scouts".; "Miller broadcast play-by-play of a golf tournament by using flag semaphore from boy scouts at each hole".) In the same year, he began broadcasting ice hockey games on CKOC from the Barton Street Arena. Hockey coach George Redding credited Miller for originating the "Tattered Tigers" nickname in 1945, referring to old uniforms worn by the Hamilton Tigers team on route to reaching the 1946 Allan Cup finals.

Miller and Bobby Hewitson organized the Ontario Sportswriters and Sportscasters Association (OSSA) with Miller as the first president, and organized the annual OSSA Sports Celebrities Dinner for charity. The first dinner was held on March 13, 1952, benefitting the Ontario Society for Crippled Children. During Miller's lifetime, the annual dinner at the Royal York Hotel raised approximately $500,000 for charity. (Note: The Sports Celebrities Dinner later became the Rogers-Conn Smythe Sports Celebrities Dinner & Auction in support of Easter Seals.) Also in 1952, OSSA held its first annual curling bonspiel for its members.

In Hamilton, he was a colleague of Melville Marks Robinson and David Griffin. While working in the editorial room in 1931, the newspaper's editor called upon Miller (because of his size) to remove a disgruntled man dressed as Santa Claus from the building, which resulted in Miller being bitten by the man. Miller retired from full-time journalism in 1964, but continued to cover curling, football, golf, and wrestling until 1967.

=== Reputation ===
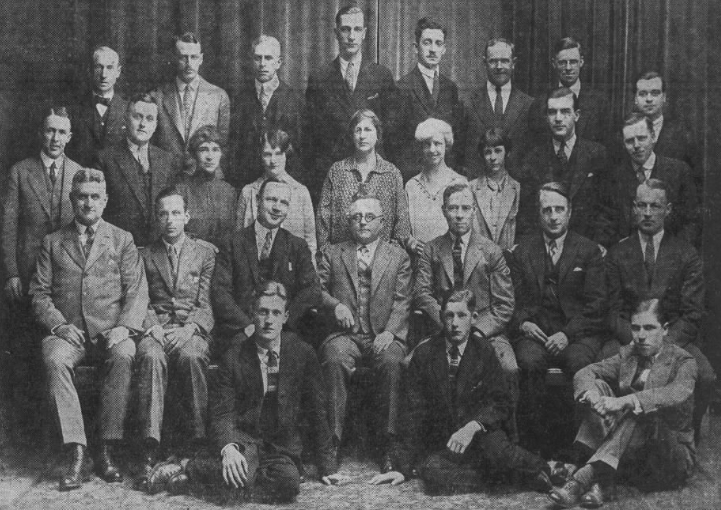
The Hamilton Spectator journalists c. 1926 (Miller, back row fourth from left)

Miller was known as "Uncle Ive" to his colleagues. Joe Watkins wrote that Miller followed the creed, "if you can't boost, don't knock", and described Miller as "factual, tolerant, broad-minded, and absent of discrimination",

The Canadian Football Hall of Fame credits Miller for being known as a hardworking journalist with a positive attitude, and the work ethic to write seven days and nights per week. Sportscaster Norm Marshall felt that Miller's athletic background let him be sympathetic to athletes, and that he had "the ability to find the unusual angle in a news development, then transpose it into literate, readable prose". Sportswriter Elmer Ferguson wrote that Miller "never lost a sense of complete impartiality and sportsmanlike fairness".

=== Publications ===
Miller's final project was an unfinished book on the history of sports in Hamilton, planned for release during the 1967 Canadian Centennial. The book was completed and published by Al Macfarlane.

- Miller, Ivan (1967). Centennial Sports Review, Hamilton, Canada: Sports over the century, 1867–1967. Hamilton, Ontario: Al Macfarlane Enterprises.

== Sports administrator ==
Miller was a committee member for the 1930 British Empire Games in Hamilton, and an official on the Hamilton and District Golf Activities Committee for 20 years. He was a member of the Chedoke Golf Club, and organized competitions between golf clubs. He was a vice-chairman of the committee in 1949, and was chairman from 1950 to 1952. (Note: Miller was a member of the Chedoke Golf Club, and vice-chairman of the Hamilton and District Golf Activities Committee. Miller was named chairman in 1950, and his term ended in 1952.) Other sports involvement included being a judge at the Hamilton Jockey Club Racetrack, an official of The Brier, treasurer of the Hamilton Bonspiel, and helping to organize baseball, rowing, and the Around the Bay Road Race. When the CANUSA Games were established in 1958 as an annual friendly international sporting competition for youths in Hamilton and Flint, Michigan, Miller wrote the games' code of ethics and athletes' oath.

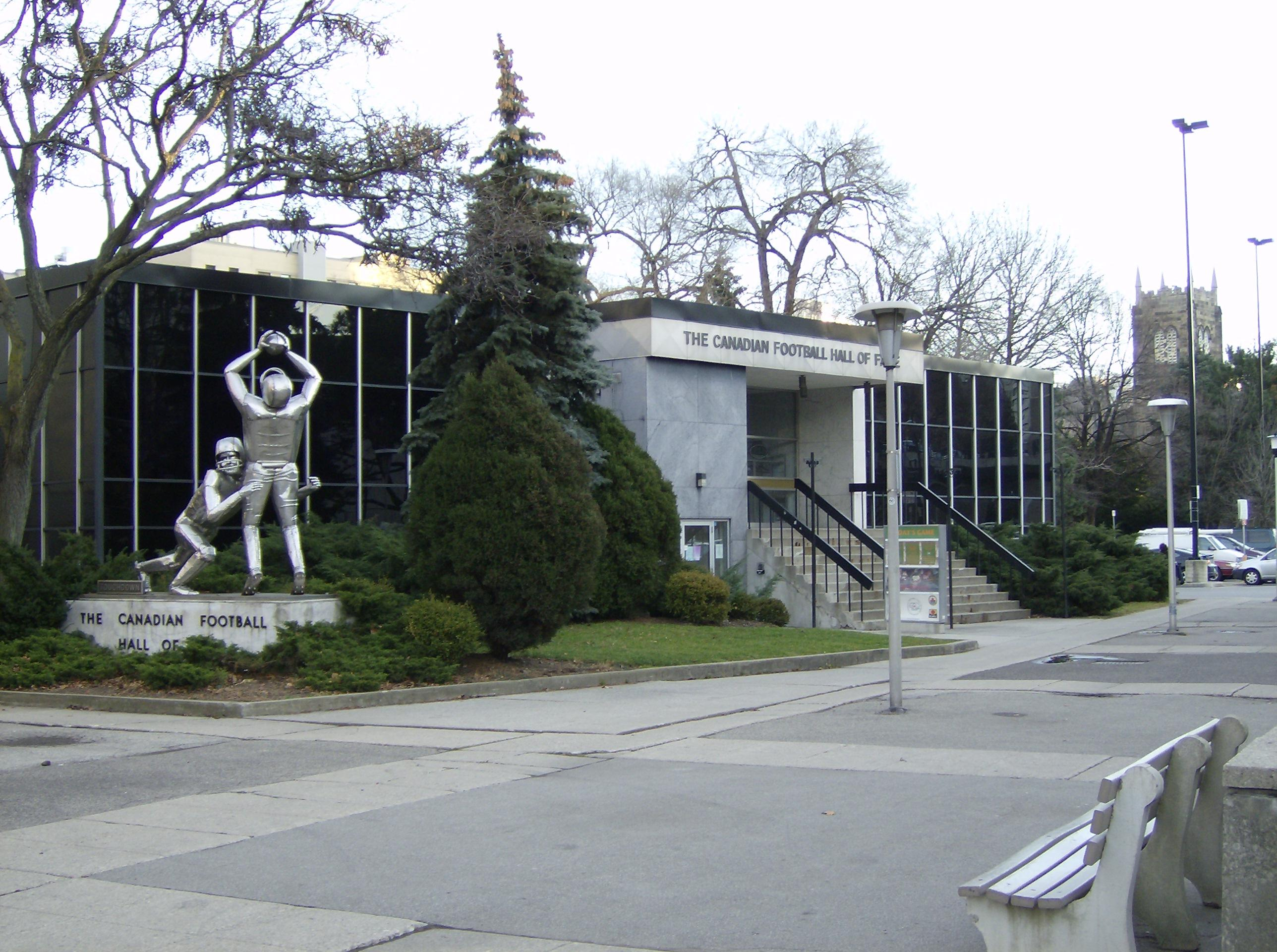
Miller was the first curator of the Canadian Football Hall of Fame and Museum (new building depicted c. 2007).

After the Canadian Football League chose Hamilton to establish a Canadian Football Hall of Fame in 1962, Miller was named the hall of fame's inaugural curator and sought donations from across Canada. By 1964, he collected more items than space was available for display, including game-worn uniforms and game-used footballs. The hall of fame was temporarily located in a large house near Scott Park, but soon had to be vacated for a high school to be built. The hall of fame sought financial donations to build a permanent location, instead of receiving funding through municipal taxes. The collection went into storage until a new location was opened in 1972.

== Honours and legacy ==
In May 1965, Miller was the guest of honour at a testimonial banquet held at the Sheraton-Connaught Hotel, with more than 600 in attendance. His gifts included a trip to the 1965 World Series, a gold watch, and a gold transistor radio. He was an honorary life member of both Army, Navy and Air Force Veterans in Canada (ANAVIC) and the Leander Boat Club of Hamilton. (Note: The Leander Boat Club was established in 1927, and represented Canada in rowing at the British Empire Games in 1930, at the Summer Olympic Games in 1932, 1936, 1948, and 1952.) In April 1967, Miller was honoured at the Ontario Golf Association centennial dinner for his lifetime of contributions to golf and promoting the game. He was one of only two Canadians at the time to hold a Professional Golfers' Association of America gold badge, gaining him entrance to any golf tournament.

Several awards were named for Miller after his death. In 1967, ANAVIC renamed its junior version of the annual Billy Sherring Around the Bay Road Race, to "The Ivan Miller Memorial", in recognition of his years of promoting the race. The Ivan Miller Memorial Trophy was first presented by The Hamilton Spectator in 1968, for the team championship of the Hamilton and District Golf Activities Committee. Since 1968, the CANUSA Games presents annually the Ivan Miller Award to a volunteer for service and exemplifying the philosophy and ideals of the event. Miller was posthumously inducted to the media section of the Canadian Football Hall of Fame in 1979, and into the builder category of the Hamilton Sports Hall of Fame in 2021.

== Personal life ==
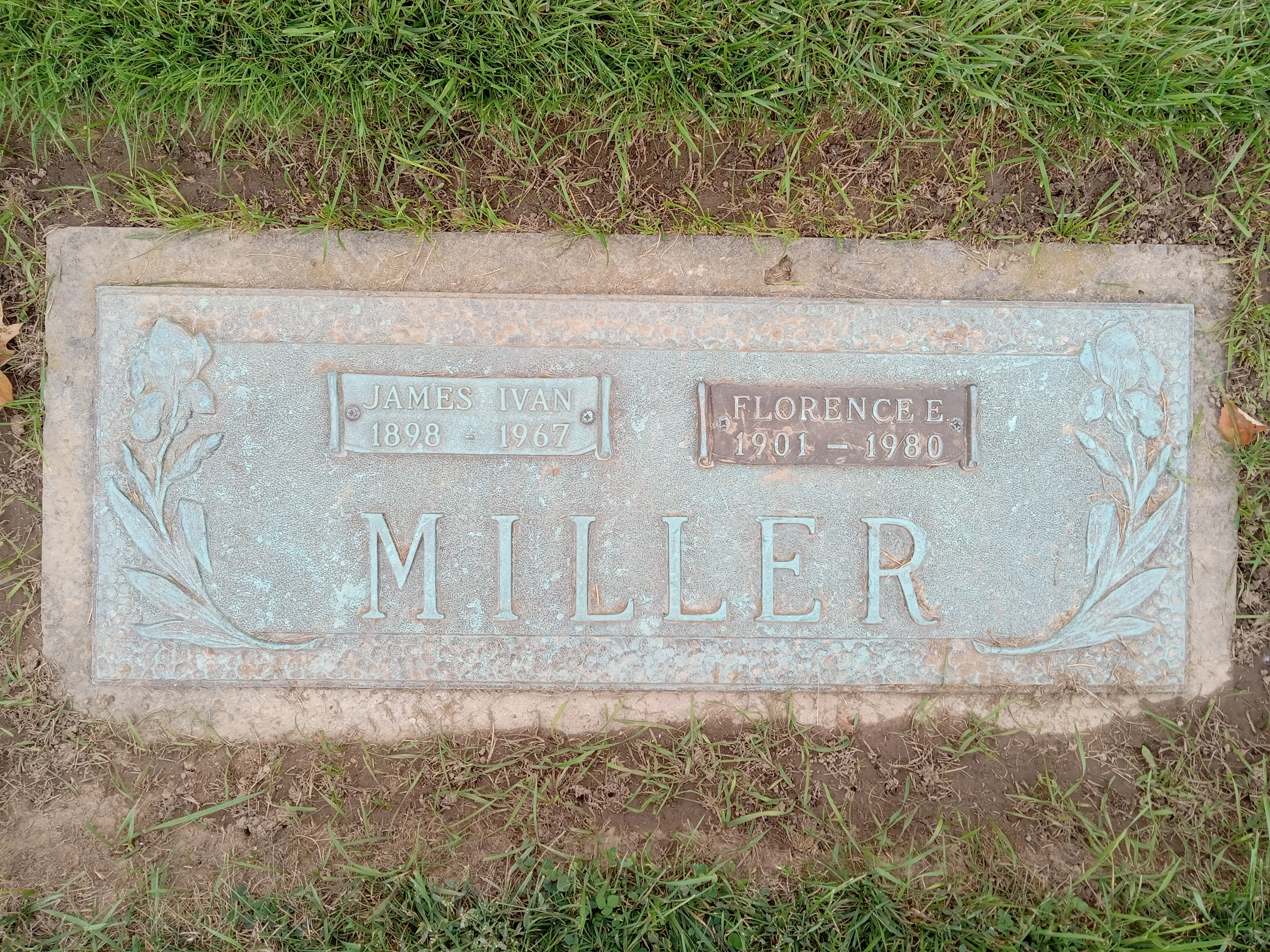
Miller's grave marker

Miller married Florence Elizabeth Stevens on February 26, 1921, in Hamilton. At the time, he worked as a clerk, and he and his wife were Presbyterian. They resided in Hamilton, and had four sons and three daughters.

Miller was a member of the Lions Clubs International of Hamilton, and was a recreational curler in bonspiels across Ontario. He began playing golf at the same time he started working at The Hamilton Spectator, and won the OSSA golf tournament 23 times. He also worked as a golf professional at the Hamilton Golf and Country Club. Miller died on June 2, 1967, at Henderson General Hospital in Hamilton, Ontario, after a month-long illness. He was interred at the White Chapel Memorial Gardens in Hamilton.
