= The StarPhoenix =

Canadian daily newspaper in Saskatchewan

- Type: Daily newspaper
- Format: Broadsheet
- Owner: Postmedia Network Inc.
- Founded: 1902
- Headquarters: 204 5th Avenue North; Saskatoon, Saskatchewan; S7K 2P1
- Circulation: 38,763 weekdays 40,230 Saturdays (as of 2015)
- ISSN: 0832-4182
- OCLC number: 938884869
- Website: www.thestarphoenix.com

The StarPhoenix is a daily newspaper that serves Saskatoon, Saskatchewan, Canada, and is a part of Postmedia Network. It has been referred to as a "sister newspaper" to the Leader-Post. The StarPhoenix puts out six editions each week and publishes one weekly, Bridges. It is also part of the canada.com web portal.

== History ==
The StarPhoenix was first published as The Saskatoon Phoenix on October 17, 1902 (following a short-lived attempt at a local newspaper, the Saskatoon Sentinel). In 1909, it became a daily paper and, in 1910, was renamed the Saskatoon Capital.

The paper was sold and bought several times between its inception and the 1920s, at one point being owned by W. F. Herman, the future owner and publisher of the Windsor Star.

By 1927, there were two daily papers in Saskatoon: the Saskatoon Daily Star and the Daily Phoenix. In January 1928, both papers were bought by the Sifton family of Winnipeg and amalgamated into the Saskatoon Star-Phoenix. In the early 1980s the spelling of the newspaper name was modified to StarPhoenix. Between the 1928 amalgamation and the launch of the Saskatoon edition of Metro in April 2016, the StarPhoenix was the city's only daily newspaper.

In the early-1990s, the paper was owned by Armadale, but it changed hands in 1995 when it was purchased by Conrad Black, making the paper part of Hollinger International. Days after Black's purchase, dozens of employees were fired from the paper in the name of cost cutting with no regard for longevity of service (decades in some cases), a firm testament to "Black's views on what he calls demanning." The paper was later, in 2000, sold to CanWest Global Communications and became part of its Southam Newspapers division, later called the CanWest News Service; in 2003 ownership was noted as being by Canwest Global, while in 2004 ownership was CanWest MediaWorks.

CanWest was acquired by Postmedia News, Inc., which is the current owner of The StarPhoenix.

In 2015, the StarPhoenix press began printing the Regina Leader-Post, in addition to its own print edition, after the Leader-Post's own press was shut down. In 2023, Postmedia announced that the StarPhoenix press would be shut down and the building be put up for sale. Both the StarPhoenix and Leader-Post were to continue publication, but printed at a facility in Estevan. The reporting staff, working from home since March 2020 at the beginning of the COVID-19 pandemic, were to continue doing so on a permanent basis.

== Circulation ==
Like most Canadian daily newspapers, The StarPhoenix has seen a decline in circulation. Circulation in 2003 was 62,915, and 56,419 in 2004. Circulation dropped by 28 percent to 39,008 copies daily from 2009 to 2015.

Daily average

== See also ==
- List of newspapers in Canada
