= Prince Albert Daily Herald =

Canadian daily newspaper in Saskatchewan

- Type: Daily newspaper
- Format: Broadsheet
- Owner(s): Folio Jumpline Publishing Inc.
- Publisher: Donna Pfeil
- Editor: Jason Kerr
- Founded: 1894, as Prince Albert Advocate
- Language: English
- Headquarters: 30 10th Street East; Prince Albert, Saskatchewan; S6V 0Y5
- Circulation: 5,684 weekdays 6,038 Saturdays (as of 2010)
- Website: www.paherald.sk.ca

The Prince Albert Daily Herald is a daily newspaper serving the city of Prince Albert, Saskatchewan, Canada, and the surrounding area.

== History ==
The Herald traces its roots to the Prince Albert Advocate, which was begun in 1894 as one of several weekly newspapers serving the community at that time.

In 1908, the paper became known as the Prince Albert Weekly Herald.

In 1911, W.F. Herman, who later served as publisher of the Windsor Daily Star in Ontario, bought the Herald and switched it to a daily newspaper. Herman soon flipped the paper back to its original owners, H. M. Hueston and Allan Holmes.

The paper celebrated its silver jubilee as a daily paper in 1936.

The Daily Herald was purchased from Thomson Corporation by Hollinger Inc. in October 1995, along with its sister papers the daily Moose Jaw Times-Herald and the weekly Swift Current Booster. These three Saskatchewan papers were then sold to CanWest in 2000 and later to Montreal-based publisher Transcontinental in 2002. In May 2016, Transcontinental sold its 13 newspapers in Saskatchewan to Star News Publishing of Alberta. Printing was re-located to Wainwright, Alberta, due to the associated shutdown of the Saskatoon-based printing facilities.

Since May 2018, the Daily Herald has been owned by FolioJumpline Publishing Inc., an employee owned company.

== See also ==
- List of newspapers in Canada
