= Champ B. Tanner =

American soil scientist and meteorologist

Champ Bean Tanner
- Born: November 16, 1920; Idaho Falls, Idaho, U.S.
- Died: September 22, 1990 (aged 69); Middleton, Wisconsin, U.S.
- Occupation: Soil scientist
- Known for: Research on evapotranspiration, soil–plant–atmosphere interactions; development of instruments for measuring plant water loss
- Awards: Fellow, American Society of Agronomy (1960); Member, National Academy of Sciences (1981)

Academic background
- Education: Brigham Young University (BS); University of Wisconsin–Madison (PhD, 1950)

Champ B. Tanner (November 16, 1920 – September 22, 1990) was an American soil scientist and professor at the University of Wisconsin–Madison, known for his research in soil physics, evapotranspiration and plant–water relationships.

== Career ==
Tanner was born in Provo, Utah, and graduated from Brigham Young University in 1942. He later earned his Ph.D. from the University of Wisconsin in 1950. He joined the University of Wisconsin faculty in the late 1940s and became a leading figure in soil science and biometeorology. His research focused on water use in plants, evaporation, and the interaction of soil, climate, and agriculture. Tanner worked on evapotranspiration and heat exchange at the earth’s surface.

He was named a fellow of the American Society of Agronomy in 1960. He later received a Fulbright grant to lecture in Australia and Papua New Guinea.

During his career, Tanner developed instruments for measuring plant water loss and contributed to advances in agricultural and environmental science. In 1981, he was elected to the National Academy of Sciences.

Tanner was active in professional societies and received honors for his contributions to soil science. He remained on the University of Wisconsin faculty for over three decades.

Champ Tanner died in 1990 at the age of 69 from pancreatic cancer.

== Honors and awards ==
- National Academy of Sciences, elected 1981
- Soil Science Research Award, Soil Science Society of America
- Outstanding Achievement in Biometeorology Award, American Meteorological Society

== Selected publications ==
- Tanner, C.B. (1959). "Energy Balance Approach to Evapotranspiration from Cropped Surfaces." Soil Science Society of America Journal, 23(1), 1-8.
- Tanner, C.B., Suomi, V.E. (1960). "Evapotranspiration and Energy Balance of Plants and Soil." Journal of Geophysical Research, 65(9), 3043–3055.
- Tanner, C.B., Sinclair, T.R. (1983). "Efficient Water Use in Crop Production: Research or Re-Search?" Advances in Agronomy, Vol. 42, pp. 1–30.
