= Frank V. Burcalow =

American agronomist (1909–1962)

Frank Victor Burcalow
- Born: March 19, 1909; Albany, Wisconsin
- Died: September 30, 1962 (aged 53); Middleton, Wisconsin
- Occupation: Agronomist

Academic background
- Education: University of Wisconsin

Academic work
- Discipline: Soil science

Frank Victor 'Vic' Burcalow (March 19, 1909 – September 29, 1962) was an American agronomist and professor at the University of Wisconsin. Burcalow became known for his contributions to soil science and crop improvement, particularly in the areas of forage crops and pasture management, and for his active role in agricultural education.

== Early life and education ==
Burcalow was born on March 19, 1909, on a farm near Albany, Wisconsin. He graduated from high school in Monroe, Wisconsin in 1927 and enrolled at the University of Wisconsin the same year. Burcalow received a Bachelor of Science degree in Agronomy in 1932, with a minor in Agricultural Education. After operating a family dairy farm until 1935, he became an Assistant in Agronomy at the University of Wisconsin. He earned a Master of Science degree in 1939 and was appointed a professor in 1949, a position he held until his death in 1962.

== Career ==
Burcalow's research primarily focused on the production and utilization of forage crops, with a special emphasis on their application to Wisconsin dairy farming. He was also involved in soil and water conservation practices. His work included promoting practices to reduce production costs for milk and other livestock products and encouraging the use of grasses for turf purposes.

In 1937, Burcalow represented the United States at the International Grassland Congress in Aberystwyth, Wales. During World War II, from October 1944 to December 1945, he served as an agronomist consultant for the Agricultural Division of the Allied Control Commission in Rome and later represented the Italian government at the European Food Conference in London in 1946. Between 1948 and 1949, he served as a turf consultant for the U.S. Department of Agriculture, focusing on airport and military base sod requirements. Burcalow helped organize the sixth International Grassland Congress held at Pennsylvania State University in 1952 and served as Chairman of the Midwest Tours Committee for the event.

== Awards and recognition ==
Burcalow became a member of the American Society of Agronomy in 1936 and was awarded a fellowship in 1953, the highest honor given by the society, for his "outstanding work in soil and crop improvement research." He also served on the Fertilizer Advisory Committee to the Food and Agriculture Organization (FAO) of the United Nations. He was a member of the Wisconsin Academy of Arts and Sciences and the American Dairy Science Association. The University of Wisconsin at Madison continues to award the Vic Burcalow Scholarship annually in Burcalow's name, stating that Burcalow was "highly regarded by farmers and peers in the Grassland Agriculture program in Wisconsin."

== Personal life ==
In 1937, Burcalow married Lois Arlene Benkert, with whom he had two children: Vicki Claire (later Mrs. Kent Johnson) and Larry Burcalow. Vic Burcalow was active in the community of Middleton, Wisconsin, serving on the Park Board from 1947 until his death and helping to organize the Community Council in 1949. He was also a charter member and secretary-treasurer of the Middleton Sportsmen's Club. Burcalow was badly injured in a tractor accident in 1957. Burcalow died at his home in Middleton on September 29, 1962, at the age of 53.

== Bibliography ==
- Plan Wisconsin Pastures (1940)
- Put Pastures to Work (1942)
- Produce Red Clover and Alfalfa Seed (1943)
- Bromegrass and Alfalfa for Hay Pasture or Silage (1944)
- Ladino Clover: A Promising Pasture Crop (1946)
- Wisconsin Needs Better Pastures (1947)
- Feeding Dairy Cows This Winter (1952)
- Sweet Clover in Wisconsin (1954)
- Bromegrass (1958)
- Alfalfa Varieties in Wisconsin (1958)
- Sudan Grass: Hot Weather Feed Insurance (1959)
- The Wojta System of Land Surface Drainage (1960) -- Co-authored by Russell F. Johannes and Arthur Edwin Peterson
- Weed Control Will Prevent Lowland Abortions in Cattle (1962)
