= Hamilton Olympic Club =

The Hamilton Olympic Club (HOC) is the oldest track and field organization in Canada. It was established in 1926 by a group of local businessmen. Many HOC athletes have competed at the provincial, national and Olympic level, including Percy Williams, Don McFarlane, Johnny Miles and Ray Lewis.

The club hosted an international club meet in 1929 against a combined team from Oxford and Cambridge University, with the English team winning by a margin of two points.

== Meets associated with ==
- Canadian Olympic Team Trials, Civic Stadium
- Canadian British Empire Games Trials, Ivor Wynne Stadium
- British Empire Games
- Dual Track and Field Meet: Oxford-Cambridge Track Team Vs Hamilton Olympic Club, Olympic Stadium
- Canusa Games: Flint, Michigan Vs Hamilton, Ontario

== Past members ==
- Phil Edwards (1907–1971) – 1932 Summer Olympics, 1936 Summer Olympics - The "Man of Bronze"
- David Griffin (1905–1944) – competed in the 1928 Summer Olympics and the 1930 British Empire Games
- Robert Kerr (1882–1963) – 1908 Summer Olympics, London: Gold in the 200 meters and Bronze in the 100 meters
