= Arthur E. Peterson =

Arthur Edwin Peterson
- Born: March 11, 1923; Curtiss, Wisconsin
- Died: January 26, 2015 (aged 91); Madison, Wisconsin

Academic background
- Education: University of Wisconsin

Arthur Edwin Peterson (March 11, 1923 – January 26, 2015) was an American soil scientist based in Wisconsin. Peterson was a professor in the University of Wisconsin-Madison Soil Science Department and was known as a soils specialist. He was known for his research in soil and water conservation, no-till corn planting, frost depth reporting, and land application of bio-solids. In 1992, Bob Bjorklund described Peterson the "guru of soils."

== Early life ==
Arthur Edwin Peterson was born on March 11, 1923 near Curtiss, Wisconsin, to Edwin and Anna (Thompson) Peterson. He married Eva Ann Mundth in 1944, and they had three sons named Donald, Robert, and William. Peterson received a Sears Roebuck Agriculture Foundation Scholarship to study agriculture at the University of Wisconsin-Madison, which was interrupted by his enrolment in the U.S. Army Air Corp Meteorology program. Peterson served with the 3124th Signal Port Service Co., then returned to UW-Madison and completed B.S. (1948), M.S., and Ph.D. degrees at the College of Agriculture.

== Career ==
Peterson joined the faculty of the UW Soil Science Department in 1950, where he worked until his retirement in 1994. Peterson's research included topics such as conservation tillage, wide-row corn, interseeding, and the prevention of soil erosion. In 1960, he worked with the State Crop Reporting Service and cemetery officials to create a statewide frost depth reporting network. In 1965, Peterson temporarily relocated to Maadi, Egypt and joined the Rockefeller Foundation as Chief Resident Consultant to the Egyptian Minister of Agriculture. This was one of several international agriculture projects in which Peterson participated.

=== Madison Cheese Fertilization Project ===
In 1954, Arthur E. Peterson led a Cheese Fertilization Project in Madison, Wisconsin in which leftover whey from nearby cheese factories was used in soil fertilization.

=== The Janesville Sludge Project ===
Peterson led the Janesville Sludge Project in Janesville, Wisconsin in 1972.

== Bibliography ==
- Exchangeable Magnesium, Calcium Content and Exchange Capacity by Horizons of Various Wisconsin Soils (1948)
- Magnesium Nutrition of Peas and Potatoes (1950)
- Land Forming: The Wojta System of Land Forming Surface Drainage (1960) — Co-authored with Frank V. Burcalow and Russell F. Johannes
- Universal Soil Loss Equation: Past, Present, and Future (1977)
