= Ivan Miller (cricketer) =

Australian cricketer

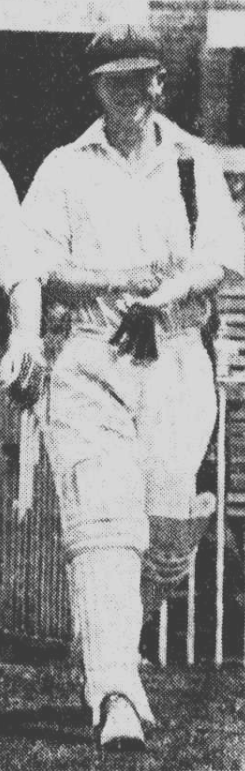

Personal information
- Born: 30 December 1913; Melbourne, Australia
- Died: 6 May 1966 (aged 52); Melbourne, Australia

Domestic team information
- Years: Team
- 1933-1936: Victoria
- Source: Cricinfo, 22 November 2015

Ivan Miller (30 December 1913 – 6 May 1966) was an Australian cricketer. He played four first-class cricket matches for Victoria between 1933 and 1936.

== See also ==
- List of Victoria first-class cricketers
