= Richard B. Corey =

American soil scientist (1927–2025)

- Born: Richard Boardman Corey; December 25, 1927; Wisconsin Rapids, Wisconsin
- Died: February 24, 2025 (aged 97)
- Scientific career
- Fields: Soil science
- Institutions: University of Wisconsin–Madison

Richard Boardman Corey (December 25, 1927 – February 24, 2025) was an American soil scientist who was a professor at the University of Wisconsin–Madison.

== Background ==
Corey was born in Wisconsin Rapids, Wisconsin. He studied at the University of Wisconsin, where he joined Alpha Zeta, a professional fraternity for agriculture and natural resources. Corey later earned master's and doctoral degrees in soils. In 1954, Corey joined the University of Wisconsin faculty as a soils specialist.

His work focused on soil chemistry and soil testing, including guidance on sampling and laboratory analysis. Corey also conducted research on soil nutrient testing, including work on copper and zinc availability in soils.

In 1967, Corey participated in a University of Wisconsin program in Nigeria, where he taught and conducted research in soil fertility and soil chemistry.

== Legacy ==
Richard B. Corey received the University of Wisconsin College of Agricultural and Life Sciences Excellence in Teaching Award in 1979.

He died on February 24, 2025.

== Bibliography ==
As per OCLC WorldCat.

Monographs

- Silicate Analysis by a Rapid Micro Spectrochemical System (1951)
- Allocation of Elemental Constituents to Mineral Species in Polycomponent Colloids of Soil (1952)
- Excessive Water Fertilization (1967)
- Agricultural Programs and Volunteer Training, Peace Corps/Nicaragua (1975)
- The MUCI-AID–Indonesian Higher Agricultural Education Project (1972)

Articles

- “Soil Tests for Available Copper and Zinc in Soils of Western Nigeria” (1973)
- “Ionic Activities of Trace Metals in Sludge-Amended Soils” (1983)
- “Chemical Concepts in Pollutant Behavior” (1979)
- “Future Developments in Soil Chemistry" (2015)
- “Physical–Chemical Aspects of Nutrient Availability” (2018)
