= Moose Jaw Times-Herald =

Canadian daily newspaper

- Type: Daily newspaper
- Format: Tabloid
- Owner: Star News Publishing
- Publisher: Gordon Brewerton
- Editor: Marlon Hector
- Founded: 1889, as Moose Jaw Times
- Ceased publication: December 7, 2017
- Language: English
- Headquarters: 44 Fairford Street West; Moose Jaw, Saskatchewan; S6H 1V1
- Circulation: 59,220 total weekly
- Website: www.mjtimes.sk.ca

The Moose Jaw Times-Herald was a daily newspaper serving the city of Moose Jaw, Saskatchewan, Canada, and the surrounding area. It was printed Tuesdays through Saturdays (Monday editions ended in 2016).

J.N. McDonald founded the Times as a weekly in 1889. One of its early owner-editors was Thomas Walter Scott in 1894–1895. Scott would later become the first Premier of Saskatchewan. The paper converted to a daily in 1906, changing its name to the Evening News; in 1920 it purchased its rival the Daily News and in 1923 established the Times Morning Herald, though this morning edition was discontinued a few years later.

In 1949, Roy Thomson purchased the Times-Herald. Thomson Newspapers published it until October 1995, when it was sold along with its sister papers the daily Prince Albert Daily Herald and the weekly Swift Current Booster to Hollinger Inc. Those three Saskatchewan papers were then sold to CanWest in 2000 and later to Montreal-based publisher Transcontinental in 2002. In May 2016, Transcontinental sold its 13 newspapers in Saskatchewan to Star News Publishing of Alberta.

Star News Publishing announced that The Times-Herald will cease publication as of December 7, 2017.

== See also ==
- List of newspapers in Canada
