= George L. Humphrey =

American chemist

George Louis Humphrey
- Born: October 5, 1921; Belleville, West Virginia, U.S.
- Died: October 18, 1994 (aged 73); Morgantown, West Virginia, U.S.
- Education: California Institute of Technology; Oregon State College (PhD, 1950)
- Scientific career
- Fields: Chemistry
- Workplaces: West Virginia University
- Thesis: Heats of Combustion of Some Cyclic Hydrocarbons (1950)

George Louis Humphrey (October 5, 1921 – October 18, 1994) was an American chemist and academic.

== Background ==
Humphrey was born in Belleville, West Virginia, and later died in Morgantown, West Virginia. Humphrey completed undergraduate studies at the California Institute of Technology alongside future Caltech professor Frederick D. Ordway; in 1946, Humphrey served as best man at Ordway's wedding. He then entered the chemistry Ph.D. program at Oregon State College, earning his doctorate in 1950. His dissertation, Heats of Combustion of Some Cyclic Hydrocarbons, examined the thermochemistry of strained-ring hydrocarbons. During Humphrey's graduate studies, he served as a research assistant in physical chemistry and as a graduate research fellow at Oregon State College.

== Career ==
Humphrey later served on the faculty of the chemistry department at West Virginia University from 1952 to 1975. By the early 1960s, he had become an associate professor of chemistry and was active in academic organizations, including serving as a chapter president of Phi Beta Kappa at the university. Humphrey also held administrative roles within the department. By 1964, he was acting chairman of the chemistry department and participated in regional scientific events, including those organized by the American Chemical Society.

In the 1970s, Humphrey served as associate chairman of the WVU Department of Chemistry and remained active in undergraduate education, including recognition of student achievement in chemistry courses. Humphrey's tenure at West Virginia University included both teaching and administrative leadership roles.

Humphrey's work was noted by other scientists in a variety of contexts; for example, in 1976, the American chemist William Earle Bucy cited Humphrey's influence, writing that he wished to "express sincere appreciation to George L. Humphrey," and explaining further that Humphrey was the person responsible for "initiating [Bucy's] interest in molecular spectroscopy" in the first place. In 1977, chemist and botanist Earl Lemley Core published an account of Humphrey's investigation into a crystalline substance that accumulated on his automobile, which was subsequently identified as aphid honeydew.

== Publications ==
- Donohue, J.; Humphrey, G. L.; Schomaker, V. (1945). "The Structure of Spiropentane". Journal of the American Chemical Society. 67: 332. Bibcode:1945JAChS..67..332D.
- Humphrey, G. L.; Badger, R. M. (1947). "The Absorption Spectrum of Ozone in the Visible". The Journal of Chemical Physics. 15 (11): 794. Bibcode:1947JChPh..15..794H. doi:10.1063/1.1749304.
- Humphrey, G. L.; Spitzer, R. (1950). "Bond Hybridization in the Non-Tetrahedral Carbon Atom". The Journal of Chemical Physics. 18 (6): 902. Bibcode:1950JChPh..18..902H. doi:10.1063/1.1749304.
- Humphrey, George L. (1950). Heats of Combustion of Some Cyclic Hydrocarbons. Oregon State College.
- Humphrey, G. L. (1951). "The Heats of Formation of TiO, Ti2 O3, Ti3 O5 and TiO2 from Combustion Calorimetry". Journal of the American Chemical Society. 73 (4): 1587. Bibcode:1951JAChS..73.1587H. doi:10.1021/ja01142a031.
- Humphrey, George L. (1951). "The Heats of Combustion and Formation of Titanium Nitride (TiN) and Titanium Carbide (TiC)". Journal of the American Chemical Society. 73 (5): 2261–2263. doi:10.1021/ja01149a100.
- Humphrey, George L. (1953). "The Heats of Formation of Hafnium Oxide and Hafnium Nitride". Journal of the American Chemical Society. 75 (12): 2806–2807. doi:10.1021/ja01108a004.
- Humphrey, George L.; O'Brien, C. J. (1953). "The Heats of Formation of Stannic and Stannous Oxides from Combustion Calorimetry". Journal of the American Chemical Society. 75 (12): 2805–2806. doi:10.1021/ja01108a003.
- McDivitt, J. R.; Humphrey, G. L. (1974). "Spectroscopic Studies of the Boron Trihalide and Borane Complexes of 1,4-Diazabicyclo[2.2.2]octane and Quinuclidine". Spectrochimica Acta Part A: Molecular Spectroscopy. 30: 1021. Bibcode:1974AcSpA..30.1021M. doi:10.1016/0584-8539(74)80038-5.
- Handzo, C. S.; Humphrey, G. L. (1979). "Kinetic Studies and Mechanisms of Reactions for Cyclopropane-1,1-Dicarboxylic Acid and of Cyclobutane-1,1-Dicarboxylic Acid in Potassium Bromide". The Journal of Organic Chemistry. 44 (6): 2146. doi:10.1021/jo00194a022.
