= Loizza Aquino =

Canadian mental health activist

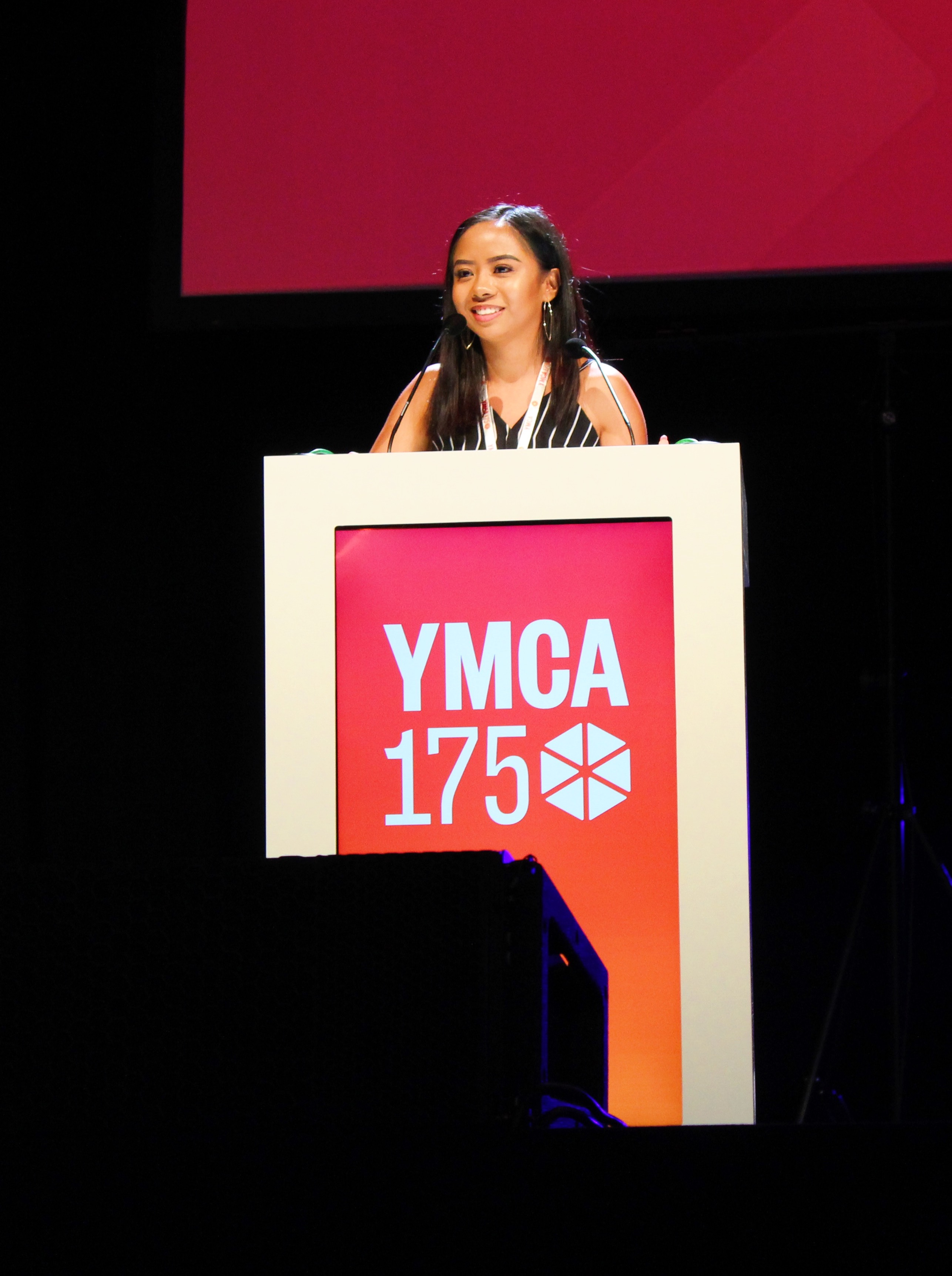
- Aquino delivering a keynote at YMCA175 in London, UK.
- Born: 1999 (age 26–27); Manila, Philippines
- Education: University of Toronto (HBSc)
- Occupation: Mental health activist
- Organization: Peace of Mind Canada
- Known for: Founder of Peace of Mind Canada
- Awards: Young Humanitarian Award – Manitoba Teachers' Society (2014); TD Community Leadership Scholarship (2017); Top 25 Canadian Immigrant Award (2018); YMCA Peace Medallion (2018)

Loizza Aquino is a Canadian mental health activist. She speaks publicly on mental health and women empowerment and founded Peace of Mind Canada.

== Early life and education ==
Loizza Aquino was born in 1999, in Manila, Philippines, but later moved to Canada with her family. She attended high school in Winnipeg, Manitoba, Canada as well as the Institut Collegial Vincent Massey Collegiate. In 2017, she began her studies at the Scarborough campus at the University of Toronto.

Being an immigrant from the Philippines has impacted Aquino's life and provided a lot of challenges. Aquino believes that there is always a lesson to be learned from challenges and uses this belief to infuse her work in mental health advocacy.

Loizza received an honours bachelor of science degree from the University of Toronto in 2021, with a double major in international development and mental health, a minor in media studies and a certificate in global development, environment & health.

== Activism ==
=== Peace Of Mind ===
When Aquino was 15 years old, a sophomore in high school, she lost her best friend to suicide. Her friend was one of four students in Winnipeg who had died by suicide within the span of one month in 2015. After these traumatic events, Loizza Aquino wanted to create a place for community members to grieve and cope together. Aquino has founded a group titled Peace of Mind, aiming to create a mental health advocacy group in her high school. The organization implements programs for teens in Manitoba and Ontario, which involves planning events that provide a safe space for youth to share their personal stories. What began with just ten students has now expanded to multiple high schools across Manitoba and Ontario, with over 2,000 students participating.

Loizza Aquino brought her organization Peace of Mind onto her college campus at U of T Scarborough with the hopes that her organization may provide another source of mental health support on campus. One of the main goals of her organization is to bridge the gap between peers and keep the conversation going. Aquino's organization, Peace of Mind Canada, holds an event called Youth Against Mental Health and Illness Stigma (YAMHIS). The goal of this organization is to create a safe space for youth to talk about their experiences with mental health issues. Aquino advocates for mental health resources in Universities under the belief that a degree “doesn't really matter” without the tools to cope with mental health issues.

== Awards ==
- In 2014 Loizza Aquino received a young humanitarian award from the Manitoba Teachers' Society
- In June 2017 she received a $70,000 community leadership scholarship from TD Bank to pursue her post-secondary education in Canada. Due to this she left home in Winnipeg and moved to Toronto.
- On June 19, 2018, Aquino was named a recipient of the Top 25 Canadian Immigrant Awards.
- Later in 2018 she received a peace medallion presented by the YMCA of Greater Toronto alongside Police Constable Dale Swift and President of the Toronto Raptors, Masai Ujiri
