= Regina Leader-Post =

Canadian newspaper in Saskatchewan

- Front page of the June 5, 2020 edition
- Type: Daily newspaper
- Format: Broadsheet
- Owner: Postmedia Network
- Founded: 1883
- Headquarters: 1964 Park Street; Regina, Saskatchewan; S4P 3G4
- Circulation: 34,047 weekdays 34,581 Saturdays (as of 2015)
- ISSN: 0839-2870
- Website: leaderpost.com

The Regina Leader-Post is a broadsheet newspaper published in Regina, Saskatchewan, owned by Postmedia Network.

== Founding ==
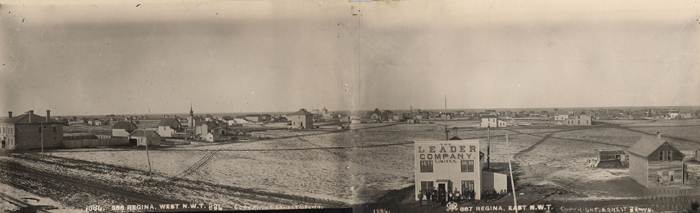
The first Leader Building with surrounding town, Regina, 1884

The newspaper was first published as The Leader in 1883 by Nicholas Flood Davin, soon after Edgar Dewdney, Lieutenant-Governor of the North-West Territories, decided to name the vacant and featureless site of Pile-O-Bones, renamed Regina by Princess Louise, Duchess of Argyll, the wife of the Governor General of Canada, as territorial capital, rather than the previously-established Battleford, Troy and Fort Qu'Appelle, presumably because he had acquired ample land on the site for resale.

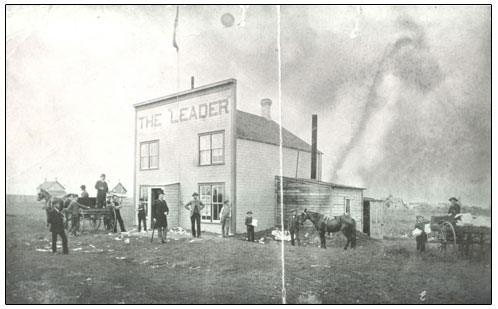
The first Leader Building, Regina, Assiniboia, 1884

"A group of prominent citizens approached lawyer Nicholas Flood Davin soon after his arrival in Regina and urged him to set up a newspaper. Davin accepted their offer – and their $5000 in seed money. The Regina Leader printed its first edition on March 1, 1883." Published weekly by the mercurial Davin, it almost immediately achieved national prominence during the North-West Rebellion and the subsequent trial of Louis Riel. Davin had immediate access to the developing story, and his scoops were picked up by the national press and briefly brought the Leader to national prominence.

Davin's greatest coup was sending his reporter Mary McFadyen Maclean to conduct a jailhouse interview with Riel. Maclean obtained this by masquerading as a francophone Catholic cleric and interviewing Riel in French under the nose of uncomprehending anglophone watch-house guards.

== Growth and absorbing competitors ==
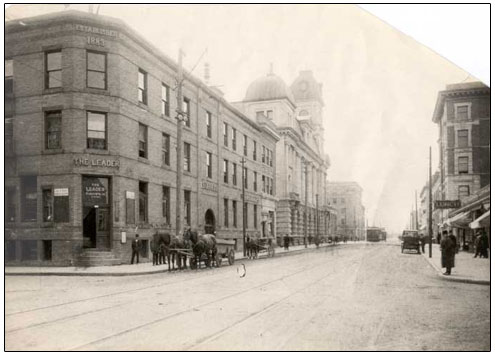
The Leader Building, 11th Avenue and Hamilton Street, downtown Regina, c. 1910.

Having begun with a small wooden shack before Regina had full streets, or electricity and plumbing outside Government House, The Leader soon moved to a substantial office building on the southwest corner of Hamilton Street and 11th Avenue, one block east of what was then the post office, southwest across street from City Hall. Also around this time, it was acquired by the Sifton family It then moved to a multi-story building across Hamilton Street to the south of the Simpson's department store. It ultimately relocated in the 1960s to east-city outskirts on Park Street at Victoria Avenue, where it still remains.

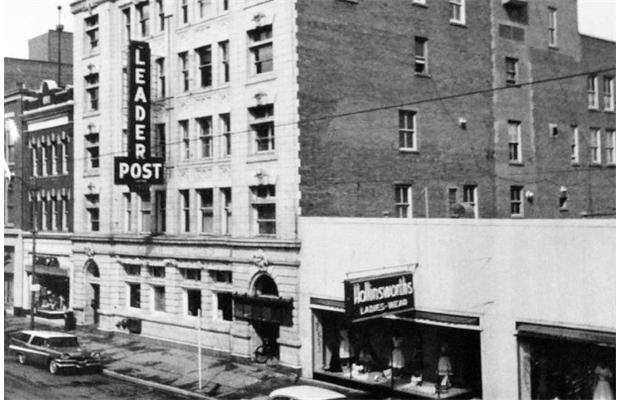
The third Leader-Post building, Hamilton Street west of the Simpson's store

In 1920, the Leader merged with another paper, the Regina Evening Post, itself in a building on Twelfth Avenue at Rose Street before the merger, and continued to publish daily editions of both before consolidating them under the title The Leader-Post in 1930. In 1922, the paper launched one of the oldest radio stations in Canada, CKCK. Five years later, the company was purchased by the Sifton family, which launched CKCK-TV, Saskatchewan's first television station, in 1954.

Newspapers were a thriving industry in the days through television's arrival in the 1950s until the Internet in the 1990s began to change people's gathering of news, compounded by the merger of local companies into ownership of local companies by national multi-corporation organizations. Other titles absorbed by the Leader-Post included the Regina Daily Star and The Province.

In 1995, the Leader-Post released an electronic version of the newspaper so that subscribers could view their newspapers on the Internet. Electronic and daily print subscribers also enjoy access to extra content not available to all readers.

== Corporate ownership ==
Decline of local news coverage radically occurred in 1996, when the paper and its sister, the Saskatoon StarPhoenix, were acquired from their owner based in Markham, Ontario, Armadale group, by Hollinger Inc., a company that was headed by the Canadian media baron Conrad Black. Within three months, the staffs at each newspaper had been cut by one quarter, which becoming a cause célèbre in Canadian journalism. The event with substantial elimination of staff and coverage of local news corresponded with one at the Regina television station CKCK-DT, once locally owned but by 1985 no longer so.

An immediate effect was a significant reduction in coverage of local and provincial news, and a greater coverage of national events. Loss of news reporter staff, the increasing television news coverage and the arrival and growth of the internet all increased difficulty in preserving, much less increasing, the Leader-Post's significance.

Black's company subsequently divested itself of the Leader-Post in 2000, together with most other Canadian news media it had owned, in conjunction with Black's renunciation of his Canadian citizenship to obtain a British peerage.

Eventually branding itself as the Regina Leader-Post, the newspaper shut down its printing facilities in 2015 in favor of being printed in Saskatoon with the press of The StarPhoenix. In 2023, Postmedia announced that the StarPhoenix press would be shut down; both the StarPhoenix and Leader-Post were to continue publication, but printed at facility in Estevan.

In early 2025, the paper along with the StarPhoenix had to explore other printing options following the closure of the Estevan print facility. Both papers are now printed in Alberta, marking the end of newspaper production in Saskatchewan.

== Circulation ==
Like most Canadian daily newspapers, the Leader-Post has seen a decline in circulation. Its total circulation dropped by 30 percent to 34,136 copies daily from 2009 to 2015.

== In popular culture ==
The opening sequence of the television sitcom The Big Bang Theory features a photo of the original building of The Leader.

== Notable journalists ==
- Dave Dryburgh, sports editor from 1932 to 1948, and Canadian Football Hall of Fame inductee

== See also ==
- List of newspapers in Canada
