= Chedoke Creek =

Stream in Hamilton, Ontario, Canada

The Chedoke Creek is an urban creek that runs through the west end of Hamilton, Ontario. It crosses the Bruce Trail and the Radial Trail.

Much of the creek is diverted below ground in concrete piping. It is a few meters at the widest and is at a depth suitable for wading (not recommended due to pollution). The flow rate and volume of the creek changes with the seasons - The spring thaw yields the greatest flow. The creek contains no fish stock, but has tested for watershed biodiversity, as part of an educational program organized by Dr. George Sorger of McMaster University for the benefit of students at Westdale Secondary School. Biodiversity is considered an indicator of health. Low biodiversity indicates pollution. Testing performed by McMaster students have detected a high E. coli count, indicating that the waters are unsafe for all humans and pets - though much less so than the East Hamilton's Red Hill Creek.

Two separate waterfalls (Chedoke Falls) flow over the Niagara Escarpment, locally referred to as "The Mountain." Both falls are located in a stretch of parkland, The Mountain Brow. The larger falls is secluded, located at the east entrance of the Chedoke Civic Golf Course and requires a dangerous hike along a steeply-inclined valley that shows bright red clay soils and an abundance of mature maple trees.
The Western Falls is visible from the Radial Trail (a gravel road suitable for pedestrian and bicyclists, no motor vehicles), just west of the Upper Paradise Street stairs and the Chedoke clubhouse. From the falls, the creek is routed under the radial trail and travels through a thin stretch of forest that separates the Chedoke Civic Golf Course from the nearby houses. At Glenside Avenue (approximately 500 meters from the Radial Trail), the creek is routed underground. It is channeled through a built concrete trough along the side of Highway 403 and empties into Cootes Paradise at Princess Point Park.

Chedoke Creek Gallery
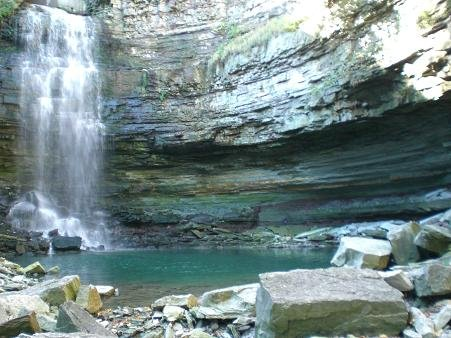
Chedoke Falls (Upper) height 15.5 m (51 ft), width 2 m (6.6 ft)

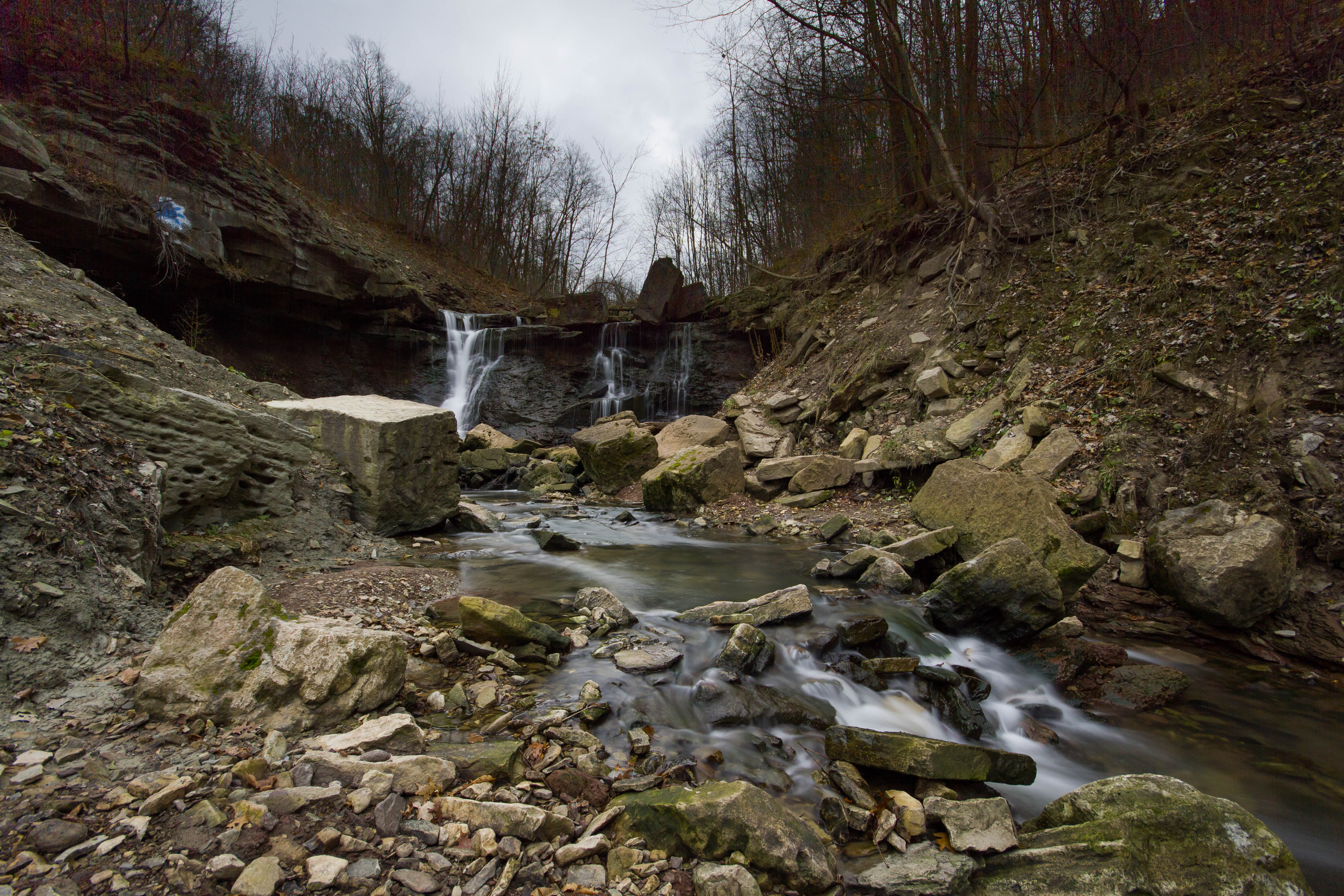
Lower falls of the Chedoke Creek in Hamilton, Ontario Canada

== See also ==
- Chedoke Falls
- Chedoke Golf Club
- Chedoke Hospital
- Chedoke Expressway
- Red Hill Creek
- Red Hill Valley Parkway
- Cootes Paradise
