= Southern Ontario Secondary Schools Association =

Southern Ontario Secondary Schools Association, or SOSSA, is member of OFSAA and the regional governing body of all secondary school athletic competitions between within the Niagara and Hamilton area representing schools for the Council Scolaire De District Du Centre Sud-Ouest, District School Board of Niagara, Hamilton-Wentworth District School Board, Niagara Catholic District School Board, Couseil Scolaire De District Catholique Centre-Sud and Independent Schools within the Association

== Zones ==
SOSSA is divided into four zones that have their own individual championships that qualify teams and student-athletes for the SOSSA championships for all sports.

- Zone #1 - Hamilton-Wentworth District School Board and independent schools presently members of zone #1.
- Zone #2 - N.C.A.A. member schools.
- Zone #3 - N.R.H.S.A.A. schools and independent schools presently members of zone #3.
- Zone #4 - N.R.H.S.A.A. schools and independent schools presently members of zone #4.

== SOSSA Championships ==
Each year SOSSA contests championships in the following sports

- Alpine skiing
- Badminton
- Baseball
- Basketball
- Cross country
- Curling
- Field hockey
- Field lacrosse
- Football
- Golf
- Hockey
- Rugby union
- Soccer
- Snowboarding
- Swimming
- Tennis
- Track and field
- Ultimate
- Volleyball
- Wrestling

== See also ==
- Ontario Federation of School Athletic Associations
