= Ontario Federation of School Athletic Associations =

School sports organization in Canada

- Headquarters: Toronto, Ontario
- Executive Director: Shamus Bourdon
- Website: http://www.ofsaa.on.ca

The Ontario Federation of School Athletic Associations (OFSAA) is an organization of student-athletes, teacher-coaches, student-coaches, teachers, principals, and sport administrators in Ontario, Canada. OFSAA is the second largest high school athletic association in North America, second only to the California Interscholastic Federation.

Approximately 270,000 students and 16,000 teacher-coaches participate in school sport in Ontario. Every individual who is involved in school sport is a member of OFSAA. The group's primary responsibility is to work with volunteer teacher-coaches to provide provincial championships for Ontario's student-athletes, and also deal with issues that affect students, coaches, schools and communities, such as drug-free sport, equity, fair play, and safe schools.

Unlike other of Canada's provincial high school athletics associations, the OFSAA is not an affiliate member of the United States–based National Federation of State High School Associations (NFHS).

== Sports offered by OFSAA ==
- Alpine skiing
- Badminton
- Baseball
- Basketball
- Cross country
- Curling
- Field hockey
- Field lacrosse
- Football (Bowl game festival only)
- Golf
- Gymnastics
- Hockey
- Nordic skiing
- Rugby union
- Soccer
- Snowboarding
- Squash
- Swimming
- Tennis
- Track and field
- Volleyball
- Wrestling

== OFSAA members associations ==
The association is made up of 18 regional associations. They include:

- Central Ontario Secondary Schools Association (COSSA)
- Central Western Ontario Secondary Schools Association (CWOSSA)
- Conference of Independent Schools of Ontario Athletic Association (CISAA)
- Eastern Ontario Secondary Schools Athletic Association (EOSSAA)
- Georgian Bay Secondary Schools Association (GBSSA)
- Golden Horseshoe Athletic Conference (GHAC)
- Lake Ontario Secondary School Athletics (LOSSA)
- National Capital Secondary Schools Athletic Association (NCSSAA)
- North Eastern Ontario Athletic Association (NEOAA)
- Northern Ontario Secondary Schools Association (NOSSA)
- North Western Ontario Secondary Schools Athletic Association (NWOSSAA)
- Region of Peel Secondary Schools Athletic Association (ROPSSAA)
- Southern Ontario Secondary Schools Association (SOSSA)
- South Western Ontario Secondary Schools Athletic Association (SWOSSAA)
- Toronto District College Athletic Association (TDCAA)
- Toronto District Secondary School Athletic Association (TDSSAA)
- Western Ontario Secondary Schools Athletic Association (WOSSAA)
- York Region Athletic Association (YRAA)

== Football bowl games ==
Eastern Bowl, Metro Bowl, National Capital Bowl, Golden Horseshoe Bowl, Simcoe Bowl, Independent Bowl, Central Bowl, Northern Bowl, Western Bowl
