= Marsha Boulton =

Canadian journalist and humorist

- Born: Canada
- Occupations: Journalist, humorist
- Spouse: Stephen Williams
- Writing career
- Period: 1990s–present
- Notable work: Letters from the Country
- Website: www.marshaboulton.com

Marsha Boulton (born c. 1952) is a Canadian journalist and humorist, who won the Stephen Leacock Award in 1996 for her book Letters from the Country. Some early media reports incorrectly credited her as the first woman ever to win the award, although in fact four women — Sondra Gotlieb, Joan Walker, Jan Hilliard and Angeline Hango — had won the award before her.

Her other books have included More Letters from the Country (1997), Just a Minute: Glimpses of Our Great Canadian Heritage (1998), Just Another Minute (1998), Letters from Across the Country (1999) and Just a Minute More (1999), as well as republished "omnibus" editions of both the Letters from the Country and Just a Minute series.

Originally from Toronto, Ontario, where she was a journalist and editor for Maclean's, she moved in 1980 to a farm in Wellington County with her husband Stephen Williams, a journalist best known for his works on Paul Bernardo and Karla Homolka. After her move, she wrote a syndicated column about country life which appeared in 40 newspapers across Canada, was a contributor to CBC Radio, and contributed to publications including Canadian Business, Chatelaine, the Toronto Star and Toronto Life.
