= 1993 in Canada =

- Decades: 1970s; 1980s; 1990s; 2000s; 2010s
- See also: History of Canada; Timeline of Canadian history; List of years in Canada

Events from the year 1993 in Canada.

== Incumbents ==
=== Crown ===
- Monarch – Elizabeth II

=== Federal government ===
- Governor General – Ray Hnatyshyn
- Prime Minister – Brian Mulroney (until June 25) then Kim Campbell (June 25 to November 4) then Jean Chrétien
- Chief Justice – Antonio Lamer (Quebec)
- Parliament – 34th (until September 8)

=== Provincial governments ===
==== Lieutenant governors ====
- Lieutenant Governor of Alberta – Gordon Towers
- Lieutenant Governor of British Columbia – David Lam
- Lieutenant Governor of Manitoba – George Johnson (until March 5) then Yvon Dumont
- Lieutenant Governor of New Brunswick – Gilbert Finn
- Lieutenant Governor of Newfoundland – Frederick Russell
- Lieutenant Governor of Nova Scotia – Lloyd Crouse
- Lieutenant Governor of Ontario – Hal Jackman
- Lieutenant Governor of Prince Edward Island – Marion Reid
- Lieutenant Governor of Quebec – Martial Asselin
- Lieutenant Governor of Saskatchewan – Sylvia Fedoruk

==== Premiers ====
- Premier of Alberta – Ralph Klein
- Premier of British Columbia – Mike Harcourt
- Premier of Manitoba – Gary Filmon
- Premier of New Brunswick – Frank McKenna
- Premier of Newfoundland – Clyde Wells
- Premier of Nova Scotia – Donald Cameron (until June 11) then John Savage
- Premier of Ontario – Bob Rae
- Premier of Prince Edward Island – Joe Ghiz (until January 25) then Catherine Callbeck
- Premier of Quebec – Robert Bourassa
- Premier of Saskatchewan – Roy Romanow

=== Territorial governments ===
==== Commissioners ====
- Commissioner of Yukon – John Kenneth McKinnon
- Commissioner of Northwest Territories – Daniel L. Norris

==== Premiers ====
- Premier of the Northwest Territories – Nellie Cournoyea
- Premier of Yukon – John Ostashek

== Events ==
=== January to June ===
- January 25 – Catherine Callbeck becomes premier of Prince Edward Island, replacing Joe Ghiz following a leadership election. This is Prince Edward Island's first female premier, and the first time in Canada that two provinces or territories have simultaneously had female premiers (until March 2011).
- January 28 – Six Innu youths from Davis Inlet, aged 11 to 14, are caught on video sniffing gasoline as a suicide attempt.
- February 24 – Prime Minister Brian Mulroney announces his resignation (effective June 25) amidst political and economic turmoil.
- March 4 – Canadian soldiers shoot and kill a Somali man outside their base in Somalia.
- March 12 – Governor General Ray Hnatyshyn proclaims a constitutional amendment adding section 16.1 to the Canadian Charter of Rights and Freedoms.
- March 16 – Canadian soldiers beat to death Shidane Arone, a Somali teenager, in Somalia.
- March 18 – Master Corporal Clayton Matchee is arrested in connection with Shidane Arone's death.
- March 29 – 1993 Prince Edward Island general election: Catherine Callbeck's Liberals win a majority. She is the first female premier to lead a party to victory in a general election.
- April 2 – The Farm Credit Corporation Act is passed.
- June: The Nunavut Land Claims Agreement Act and the Nunavut Act are passed, leading to the eventual creation of Nunavut in 1999.
- June 11 – John Savage becomes premier of Nova Scotia, replacing Donald Cameron.
- June 15 – Alberta election: Ralph Klein's PCs win a seventh consecutive majority.
- June 20 – A landslide on the South Nation River destroys the abandoned townsite of Lemieux, Ontario.
- June 25 – Kim Campbell becomes prime minister, replacing Brian Mulroney. She is the first woman to be the country's head of government.

=== July to December ===
- September 16 – Canadian forces engage in an intensive firefight with Croatian forces during Operation Medak Pocket.
- September 27 – The Social Credit Party of Canada is officially deregistered by Elections Canada.
- October 4 – The Krever Inquiry into Canada's blood system begins.
- October 14 – The Tories release an election ad that many see as mocking Jean Chrétien's facial paralysis.
- October 23 - The Toronto Blue Jays defeat the Philadelphia Phillies, 4 games to 2, winning their second World Series Title.
- October 25 – Federal election: Jean Chrétien's Liberals win a majority, defeating Kim Campbell's PCs, which are reduced to two seats. Campbell loses her own seat. The Bloc Québécois form the official opposition.
- November 4 – Jean Chrétien is sworn in as prime minister, replacing Kim Campbell.

=== Full date unknown ===
- Canadian Major-General Roméo Dallaire appointed commander of the U.N. forces in Rwanda.

== Arts and literature ==
=== New works ===
- Margaret Atwood, The Robber Bride
- Réjean Ducharme, Dévadé
- Dave Duncan, The Stricken Field
- William Gibson, Virtual Light
- Michael Ignatieff, Scar Tissue
- Thomas King, One Good Story, That One
- Antonine Maillet, Le nuit des roi
- Yann Martel, The Facts Behind the Helsinki Roccamatios
- Farley Mowat, My Father's Son
- Robert J. Sawyer, Fossil Hunter
- Jeffrey Simpson, Faultines, Struggling for a Canadian Vision

=== Awards ===
- American-born E. Annie Proulx's The Shipping News, set in Newfoundland, wins the American National Book Award
- See 1993 Governor General's Awards for a complete list of winners and finalists for those awards.
- Books in Canada First Novel Award: John Steffler, The Afterlife of George Cartwright: A Novel
- Geoffrey Bilson Award: Celia Barker Lottridge, Ticket to Curlew
- Gerald Lampert Award: Elisabeth Harvor, Fortress of Chairs and Roberta Rees, Eyes Like Pigeons
- Marian Engel Award: Sandra Birdsell
- Pat Lowther Award: Lorna Crozier, Inventing the Hawk
- Stephen Leacock Award: John Levesque, Waiting for Aquarius
- Trillium Book Award: Jane Urquhart, Away and Margaret Atwood, The Robber Bride
- Vicky Metcalf Award: Phoebe Gilman

=== Television ===
- This Hour Has 22 Minutes premieres on CBC

=== Film ===
- Harmony Cats earns 11 Genie Award nominations
- Thirty Two Short Films About Glenn Gould is released

=== Music ===
- Bryan Adams, So Far So Good
- Jann Arden, Time for Mercy
- The Band, Jericho
- Big Sugar, Five Hundred Pounds
- Blinker the Star, Blinker the Star
- Blue Rodeo, Five Days in July
- Cowboy Junkies, Pale Sun, Crescent Moon
- Crash Test Dummies, God Shuffled His Feet
- Crash Vegas, Stone
- cub, Betti-Cola
- Céline Dion, The Colour of My Love
- Doughboys, Crush
- Eric's Trip, Love Tara
- Lawrence Gowan, ...but you can call me Larry
- Great Big Sea, Great Big Sea
- Grievous Angels, Watershed
- Hart-Rouge, Blue Blue Windows
- The Headstones, Picture of Health
- I Mother Earth, Dig
- The Inbreds, Hilario
- Intermix, Phaze Two
- Junkhouse, Here Lies Happiness and Strays
- King Cobb Steelie, King Cobb Steelie
- The Look People, Crazy Eggs
- Lost Dakotas, Sun Machine
- Sarah McLachlan, Fumbling Towards Ecstasy
- Me Mom and Morgentaler, Shiva Space Machine
- Moxy Früvous, Bargainville
- Odds, Bedbugs
- The Pursuit of Happiness, The Downward Road
- The Rankin Family, North Country
- Rose Chronicles, Dead and Gone to Heaven
- Rush, Counterparts
- Jane Siberry, When I Was a Boy
- Skydiggers, Just Over This Mountain
- Spirit of the West, Faithlift
- The Tea Party, Splendor Solis
- 13 Engines, Perpetual Motion Machine
- Shania Twain, Shania Twain
- Voivod, The Outer Limits

== Sport ==
- February 23 – The Sacramento Gold Miners are established as the first US franchise in the Canadian Football League
- March 12 to 14 – Toronto hosts the 1993 IAAF World Indoor Championships at the Skydome.
- May 23 – The Sault Ste. Marie Greyhounds win their only Memorial Cup by defeating the Peterborough Petes 4 to 2. The entire tournament was played at Sault Memorial Gardens in Sault Ste. Marie, Ontario
- June 9 – The Montreal Canadiens win their 24th (and last to date) Stanley Cup by defeating the Los Angeles Kings 4 games to 1. The deciding Game 5 was played at the Montreal Forum. Quebec City, Quebec's Patrick Roy is awarded the Conn Smythe Trophy
- October 23 – The Toronto Blue Jays win their second World Series by defeating the Philadelphia Phillies 4 games to 2. The deciding Game 6 was played at Skydome in Toronto making this the first World Series to be decided on Canadian soil.
- November 4 – The Toronto Raptors are established as the National Basketball Association's first Canadian team since the Toronto Huskies in 1947. They will play their first game in 1995
- November 20 – The Toronto Varsity Blues win their second (and first since 1965) Vanier Cup by defeating the Calgary Dinos by a score of 37–34 in the 29th Vanier Cup played Skydome in Toronto
- November 28 – The Edmonton Eskimos win their 11th Grey Cup by defeating the Winnipeg Blue Bombers 33 to 23 in the 81st Grey Cup played at McMahon Stadium in Calgary.
- Ben Johnson is permanently banned from international competition after again testing positive for banned substances.
- As of 2020, this is the only year in which the Stanley Cup and the World Series were both won by Canadian teams.

== Births ==
- January 4 – Aaryn Doyle, actress and singer
- January 21 – Jason Godin, politician
- January 26 – Cameron Bright, actor
- February 24 – Phillip Danault, ice hockey player
- March 14 – Demetrius Joyette, actor
- March 15
  - Alyssa Reid, singer and songwriter
  - Mark Scheifele, ice hockey player
- March 25 – Braeden Clarke, actor
- April 8 – Tyler Shaw, singer and songwriter
- April 20 – Kurtis Gabriel, ice hockey player
- April 23 – Brooke Palsson, actress
- April 25 – Lyldoll, singer and songwriter
- May 16 – Atticus Mitchell, actor and musician
- May 18 – Stuart Percy, ice hockey player
- May 20 – Kevin Roy, ice hockey player
- May 26 – Katerine Savard, swimmer
- June 6 – Jesse Carere, actor
- June 15 – Boone Jenner, ice hockey player
- July 1 – Brett Ritchie, ice hockey player
- July 3 – PartyNextDoor, rapper, singer, songwriter, and record producer
- July 9 – Emily Hirst, actress
- July 28 – Hannah Lochner, actress
- August 6 – Charlie Bilodeau, pair skater
- September 1 – Alexander Conti, actor
- September 11 – Oliver Scholfield, field hockey player
- October 30 – Brett Kelly, actor
- November 28 – Stephanie Park, Paralympic wheelchair basketball player
- December 16 – Stephan James, actor
- December 29 – Gabby May, artistic gymnast

== Deaths ==
- January 26 – Jeanne Sauvé, politician and first female Governor General of Canada (born 1922)
- January 28 – Helen Hogg-Priestley, astronomer (born 1903)
- February 28 – Ruby Keeler, actress, singer and dancer (born 1909)
- April 2 – Alexander Bell Patterson, politician (born 1911)
- April 15 – John Tuzo Wilson, geophysicist and geologist (born 1908)
- April 30 – Colin Emerson Bennett, politician and lawyer (born 1908)
- May 2 – Stephen Juba, politician and Mayor of Winnipeg (born 1914)
- May 9 – Jacques Dextraze, Canadian general (born 1919)
- May 30 – H. Gordon Barrett, politician (born 1915)
- June 9 – Alexis Smith, actress (born 1921)
- July 9 – Garry Hoy, lawyer (born 1955)
- August 14 – Francis Mankiewicz, film director, screenwriter and producer (born 1944)
- September 12 – Raymond Burr, actor (born 1917)
- September 27 – Fraser MacPherson, jazz musician (born 1928)
- October 24 – Tracy Latimer, murder victim (born 1980)

== See also ==
- 1993 in Canadian television
- List of Canadian films of 1993
