= New Majority =

New Majority may refer to:

- New Majority (TV series), a Canadian current affairs television series
- Nueva Mayoría (New Majority) (Chile), a Chilean centre-left electoral coalition created in 2013
- New Majority (Slovakia), a conservative political party in Slovakia
- New Majority (Peru), a right-wing Peruvian political party
- New Majority (Monaco), a Monegasque centre-right coalition created in 2016
- The New Majority (book), book by Pat Buchanan
