= Jennifer Craig =

Jennifer Craig may refer to:

- Jennifer Craig (writer) (1934–2023), Canadian writer
- Jennifer Craig (academic), Scottish–New Zealand academic optometrist

== See also ==
- Jenny Craig, Inc.
- Jenny Craig (entrepreneur)
