= Through the Eyes of Tomorrow =

- Genre: youth variety, public affairs
- Presented by: various
- Country of origin: Canada
- Original language: English
- No. of seasons: 4

Production
- Producers: Neil Andrews; Perry Rosemond
- Running time: 30–60 minutes

Original release
- Network: CBC Television
- Release: 9 January 1966 – 29 June 1969

Through the Eyes of Tomorrow is a Canadian variety and public affairs television program that aired on CBC Television from 1966 to 1969.

== Premise ==
This program combined journalism, music and drama for a youth audience.

During its first run in 1966, the program was hosted by Paul Saltzman and Janet McQuillin. Each episode featured a given theme such as music, sex, drugs or overseas work. Personalities such as Peter Kastner, Richard J. Needham and Ed Thigpen appeared during the 1966 season.

In the following year, Saltzman continued with the program as a reporter and writer. However, episodes featured a changing roster of numerous hosts such as Rex Hagon and Jennifer Leak. Featured subjects included the Company of Young Canadians, Expo 67 and the Vietnam War.

The 1968 episodes were hosted by Brant Frayne, Carol Hunter and Wayne Thompson.

The final episodes in 1969, hosted by Stephen Foster, included an interview with Jimi Hendrix.

== Scheduling ==
This program was broadcast on Sunday afternoons for an hour in the 1966 season, the half-hour episodes for the remaining seasons.

Season	Air dates		Time	Notes
1966	9 January	10 July	2:00 p.m.	Hour-long episodes
1967	8 January	18 June	4:30 p.m.	
1968	21 January	30 June	4:30 p.m.	
1969	23 February	13 April	3:30 p.m.	
1969	20 April	29 June	4:30 p.m.	
