= Morley Torgov =

Canadian novelist, humorist, and lawyer (1927–2026)

Morley Lorne Torgov CM (December 3, 1927 – July 19, 2026) was a Canadian novelist, humorist and lawyer. He had a 70 year career in law as a partner in the Toronto-firm Olch Torgov and Cohen LLP.

== Life and career ==
Torgov was born in Sault Ste. Marie, Ontario on December 3, 1927, the only child of Allen and Sarah Jane Torgov.

He wrote for The Sault Daily Star as a columnist and reporter from 1941 to 1946. Torgov has credited his experience writing for the newspaper with helping him learn to write creatively.

He studied law at Osgoode Hall in Toronto, becoming a lawyer in 1954. He practised real estate and corporate law for 70 years as a senior partner in the Toronto-based legal firm Olch Torgov and Cohen.

Torgov wrote and published eight books. His first, A Good Place To Come From, a collection of short stories based on his experiences and Jewish up-bringing in depression-era Sault Ste. Marie was published in 1974. The book was met with critical praise. William French, literary editor for The Globe and Mail called the book as a "triumph" and described Torgov as "a natural storyteller" who "writes with considerable skill. He doesn't fall into the trap of sentimentality, and there's enough distance between him and Sault Ste. Marie now that he can be objective and realistic. He cal also be very funny." Similarly, The Toronto Star's book editor praised the memoir as "some of the most enjoyable writing in this season" that "works its way under the skin, lightens the heart, and makes one reflect on its contents, much as a good novel does."

The success of A Good Place to Come From allowed Torgov's writing to find a television audience as well. The Canadian Broadcasting Corporation adapted it to a three episode series that aired on television in Canada in March 1980.

Torgov's 1982 novel The Outside Chance of Maximilian Glick was adapted into the 1988 film of the same name.

Torgov died on July 19, 2026, at the age of 98.

== Family ==
Torgov married Anna Pearl Cohen on December 26, 1952 at Prince Arthur House in Toronto.

He was the father of actress and artist Sarah Torgov.

== Honours ==
Torgov was twice awarded the Stephen Leacock Medal for Humour for A Good Place To Come From and The Outside Chance of Maximilian Glick.

In 1990, he received honorary doctor of letters degrees from Algoma University in Sault Ste. Marie and Laurentian University in Sudbury, Ontario.

In 2015, he was named a member of the Order of Canada for his contributions to Canadian literature as a humourist and storyteller.

== Awards and recognition ==
- 1975: winner, Stephen Leacock Memorial Medal for Humour, A Good Place to Come From
- 1978: finalist, Books in Canada First Novel Award, The Abramsky Variations
- 1983: winner, Stephen Leacock Memorial Medal for Humour, The Outside Chance of Maximilian Glick

== Bibliography ==
- 1974: A Good Place to Come From (Lester and Orpen Dennys) ISBN 0-919630-66-9
- 1977: The Abramsky Variations (Lester and Orpen Dennys) ISBN 0-919630-80-4
- 1982: The Outside Chance of Maximilian Glick (Lester and Orpen Dennys) ISBN 0-919630-29-4, paperback ISBN 1-55192-548-6, Seal paperback ISBN 0-7704-2431-7
- 1990: St Farb's Day (Lester and Orpen Dennys) ISBN 0-88619-333-8
- 1998: The War to End All Wars (Malcolm Lester) ISBN 1-894121-06-6
- 2002: Stickler and Me (Raincoast) ISBN 1-55192-546-X
- 2008: Murder in A-major (RendezVous Crime) ISBN 1-894917-65-0
- 2012: The Mastersinger from Minsk (Dundurn) ISBN 978-1-4597-0203-5
