= Bill Conall =

Canadian writer

- Born: Bill Root; Brockville, Ontario
- Occupations: humorist, novelist, musician
- Writing career
- Period: 2010s
- Notable works: The Promised Land; a novel of Cape Breton

Bill Conall is a Canadian writer who won the Stephen Leacock Memorial Medal for Humour in 2014 for his book The Promised Land; a novel of Cape Breton.

Originally from Brockville, Ontario, Conall lived in many places across Canada before moving to Victoria County, Nova Scotia in the early 2000s. His debut book, The Rock in the Water, was published in 2009 and was also a shortlisted nominee for the Stephen Leacock Medal. His other book, Some Days Run Long (Boularderie Island Press, 2018), was shortlisted for the 2019 Alistair MacLeod Prize for Short Fiction.

== Works ==
- The Rock in the Water (2009, ISBN 9781897475294)
- The Promised Land (2013) ISBN 9780991855209)
- Some Days Run Long (2018) ISBN 9781926448275
