= The Bandy Papers =

The Bandy Papers is a series of novels chronicling the exploits of a World War I fighter ace named Bartholomew Wolfe Bandy. The author, Donald Jack, served in the RAF during World War II. Every book in the Bandy Papers series contains the word "me" in the title, as do many of the chapter titles, which can also be interpreted as photo captions. The first novel was Three Cheers for Me but it was later expanded into three books, the first three below, one of which was then republished in two parts,

1. Three Cheers for Me (1973)
2. That's Me in the Middle (1973)
3. It's Me Again (1975), also published in two volumes (numbered 3 and 4) as It's Me Again and Me Among the Ruins
4. Me Bandy, You Cissie (1979)
5. Me Too (1983)
6. This One's On Me (1987)
7. Me So Far (1989)
8. Hitler vs. Me (1996)
9. Stalin vs. Me (2005) (1962),

Bandy was born on July 14, 1893. Physically he is described as over 6 feet tall and with a face like a horse. His voice is high pitched and whiney and is said to resemble that of W.C. Fields, whom he once met. This combination seems to drive most people (and many animals) he meets to dislike him and as a result he has developed a "stone face" to counter these attacks (a defence that often backfires by inciting his enemies to greater levels of malice). His talents, although well disguised, are real and he has certainly been an influential (though minor) character in history.

Bandy was born and raised in Beamington, in the Ottawa Valley in Ontario, where his father was a minister. It is introduced as "a good town: there was no place to get a drink but there were nine churches". Since Beamington is said to be "twenty miles" from Ottawa, "a town of sun baked, frost cracked brick, splintering timber, and brown grass" across the river from Quebec, one likely location is Cumberland, Ontario. If the town is to the West, another possibility would be Dunrobin, Ontario.

From his published papers, Bandy seems to have had a difficult time fitting in with his schoolmates. There is a reference in Me Bandy, You Cissie that he was an invalid for a time during his childhood. He finished school and was at the University of Toronto Medical School when the First World War broke out. Bandy volunteered for the infantry in 1916 after being kicked out of medical school and was commissioned as a 2nd lieutenant in the Canadian Army. After spending some time in the trenches, it was decided that the infantry was not entirely suited to his talents and so he was transferred to the Royal Flying Corps, where he stayed on and off for the rest of the war, until being sent to Russia to fight Bolsheviks, where he was captured by Red Russian forces at the Battle of Toulgas on November 11, 1918. His military career went from the heights of the Air Board to the lows of fighting in a bicycle battalion. He left the air force in 1920 as a lieutenant acting major general.

After the war and his imprisonment in Russia, Bandy had short but illustrious careers in silent films, rum-running, politics, and airplane design. When several of his careers threatened to land him in prison (or worse, Cabinet), Bandy returned to Europe, flying via Iceland, to restore his fortunes through the marketing of the Gander, an amphibious aircraft of his design. His plans came to naught when he lost the Gander during the rescue of a downed aviator in the English Channel. He was forced to seek employment as a lowly hospital porter until being sought out by the rescued aviator, who turned out to be the son of an Indian Maharajah. Offered employment in the Maharajah's air force, Bandy continued his long tradition of upsetting the powers that be by accepting this controversial appointment. This led to him being knighted, but he seldom used his title. It is mentioned that he flew for the Republicans in the Spanish Civil War, but this is not detailed. In World War II, Bandy again fought against Germany and became reacquainted with a son from a previous adventure. In the final volume of the series, Bandy faces Germany's top fighter pilot in combat before returning to the Soviet Union for the Yalta Conference at the end of the war, where he has to cope with Stalin's paranoia and secret police.

The books are noted for their humour and word play, as well as technical and historical accuracy (except possibly in India). Three Cheers for Me (1963), That's Me in the Middle (1974), and Me Bandy, You Cissie (1980) won the Stephen Leacock Memorial Medal for Humour.
