= Arthur Black (humorist) =

Canadian humourist and radio personality

- Born: Arthur Raymond Black; 30 August 1943; Toronto, Ontario, Canada
- Died: 21 February 2018 (aged 74); Salt Spring Island, British Columbia, Canada
- Occupations: humourist, writer, broadcaster
- Years active: 1972–2018
- Employer: CBC Radio
- Known for: Basic Black
- Notable work: Black in the Saddle Again (1996), Black Tie and Tales (1999), Pitch Black (2006)
- Spouse: Lynne Raymond
- Awards: Stephen Leacock Memorial Medal for Humour

Arthur Raymond Black (30 August 1943 – 21 February 2018) was a Canadian humourist and radio personality best known as the longtime host, from 1983 to 2002, of Basic Black on CBC Radio One which had a weekly audience of more than 600,000 listeners. He also wrote a series of 19 humorous books and for 40 years wrote a weekly humour column which began in 1976 in a local Thunder Bay newspaper called Lakehead Living and at its peak was syndicated to more than 50 newspapers in Canada and internationally.

== Life and career ==
Black's father, also named Arthur, ran a stockyard in Toronto with his three brothers until his death in 1960. A year after his father's death, the younger Black moved to the rural community of Fergus, Ontario, where he had relatives, in order to finish high school and then returned to Toronto to study journalism at the Ryerson Institute of Technology.

He travelled in Europe for four years, earning some money on freelancing jobs such as writing for a tourist guide.

Returning to Canada, he worked variously as a door-to-door encyclopedia salesman, oil tanker deckhand, cow wrangler at the Ontario Public Stock Yards, sheet metal apprentice, and plumber's assistant.

His broadcasting career started at CBC Radio in Toronto when he was hired in 1972 to contribute livestock reports to Radio Noon. In 1974, he moved to CBC Radio station CBQ in Thunder Bay to host that station's version of Radio Noon. He was also a contributor to the regional weekend program Fresh Air for several years. Basic Black began as a national variety program from Thunder Bay before relocating to Toronto a few years into its run, and finally to Vancouver in 1995.

He wrote and hosted Weird Homes and Weird Wheels for a total of five years on the Life Network in the late 1990s.

Black is the author of 19 books and a three-time winner of the Stephen Leacock Memorial Medal for Humour as well as winning a National Magazine Award for Humour, and an ACTRA Award for Best Opinion/Commentary, a Cadogan Award for Best Weekly Newspaper Column, and the Ohio State Award for Best Children's Series.

Black moved to Salt Spring Island, British Columbia in 1995. After ending Basic Black in 2002, he could still be heard for about a decade, twice a week, on CBC Victoria's local All Points West program with a segment called "Planet Salt Spring". In retirement, Black volunteered as a driver for Meals on Wheels, raised money for local causes and developed a hobby carving walking sticks.

In 2017, he campaigned for a "no" vote in a referendum on incorporating Salt Spring Island as a municipality, saying: "We've got something special here. Don't try to change Salt Spring. Let Salt Spring try to change you." His position prevailed.

Black was diagnosed with Stage IV terminal pancreatic cancer on 2 January 2018 and blogged in the last weeks of his life about what he called his "final journey". In excruciating pain when the cancer became much more aggressive, Black chose to die with medical assistance at Lady Minto Hospital on Salt Spring Island on 21 February 2018 at the age of 74.

== Books ==
- Basic Black: The Wit and Whimsy of Arthur Black (1981)
- Back to Black (1986)
- Arthur! Arthur! (1991)
- That Old Black Magic (1989)
- Black by Popular Demand (1994)
- Black in the Saddle Again (1996)
- Black Tie and Tales (1999)
- Flashblack! (2002)
- Black & White and Read All Over (2004)
- Pitch Black (2006)
- Black Gold (2006)
- Black to the Grindstone (2007)
- Planet Salt Spring (2009) audiobook
- Black is the New Green (2009)
- A Chip Off the Old Black (2010)
- Looking Blackward (2012)
- Fifty Shades of Black (2013)
- Paint the Town Black (2015) Harbour Publishing
