= 419 (novel) =

Book by Will Ferguson

- First edition cover
- Author: Will Ferguson
- Language: English
- Genre: fiction
- Publisher: Penguin Canada
- Publication date: 2012
- Publication place: Canada
- Media type: Print (hardback & paperback)
- ISBN: 978-0143176015
- OCLC: 8849873414

419 is a novel by Canadian writer Will Ferguson. Published by Penguin Canada in 2012, the novel was the winner of the 2012 Scotiabank Giller Prize.

Titled for the section of the Nigerian Criminal Code that deals with fraud, the events of the novel are set in motion by Henry Curtis, a retired school teacher in Calgary, Alberta, who dies in a car accident after becoming embroiled in an advance-fee fraud scam that has left his family destitute. Following his death, his daughter Laura travels to Lagos, Nigeria, in an attempt to track down and bring to justice the perpetrator of the scam.

Prior to the novel's publication, Ferguson was known primarily as a writer of humor literature. At the Giller Prize gala, he told the media that the novel "began with the thought that maybe there really is a Nigerian prince somewhere who can't gain his freedom for lack of funds...but when I started writing it, the story began to turn dark, all by itself."

== Reception ==
The novel received generally positive reviews. The Globe and Mail called it "Riveting. Provocative." The Toronto Star called it "a persuasive work of fiction based on a very original premise."
