= Mark Waddell =

Canadian writer

Mark Waddell is a Canadian writer.

Born and raised in Calgary, Alberta, he earned a Ph.D. in the history of science, medicine, and technology from Johns Hopkins University, and was a professor at Michigan State University for fifteen years. He later retired to Vancouver Island with his husband, where he writes and plays viola with the Civic Orchestra of Victoria.

His debut mystery novel, The Body in the Back Garden, was published in 2023, and was shortlisted for the Lilian Jackson Braun Award at the 2024 Edgar Awards.

Colin Gets Promoted and Dooms the World, a comedic horror novel in which a young gay man unwittingly unleashes a threat of apocalypse when he makes a deal with a demon to earn a big promotion at work, was published in 2025, and was a shortlisted finalist for the Stephen Leacock Memorial Medal for Humour in 2026.

His third novel, Messy as Hell, is slated for publication in 2027.
