= New Majority (TV program) =

- Genre: Current affairs
- Presented by: 4 hosts: Marie Morgan, Allen Kates, Richard Wells, Ed Fitzgerald (1970); Ian McCutcheon (1971); Jan Tennant (1972)
- Country of origin: Canada
- Original language: English
- No. of seasons: 2

Production
- Executive producer: Don Elder
- Producers: John Ryan; Ruth Broughner (1971-1972)
- Production location: Toronto
- Running time: 30-60 minutes

Original release
- Network: CBC Television
- Release: 18 January 1970 – 25 June 1972

Related
- Through the Eyes of Tomorrow

New Majority is a Canadian current affairs television program that aired on CBC Television from 1970 to 1972.

== Premise ==
Subject material in this program concerned young adults aged up to their mid-20s who, according to popular belief, comprised most of the population, hence the program's title. Previously, the CBC dealt with such subject matter in the program Through the Eyes of Tomorrow (1966–1969). Topics included suicide, social welfare, alternative lifestyles, contemporary music and culture. Reporting and editing staff included Ed Fitzgerald, Allen Kates, Marie Morgan and Richard Wells who were aged in their early 20s.

Episodes of this Toronto-based program included discussion, interview and filmed report segments. As the 1971 episodes began, New Majority converted to a magazine style with segments contributed by other CBC production centres such as Edmonton, Halifax, Montreal, Ottawa, Vancouver and Winnipeg.

== Scheduling ==
This series was broadcast as follows:

Day	Time	Duration	Season run
Sundays	4:00 p.m.	60 minutes	18 January to 28 June 1970
Mondays	10:30 p.m.	30 minutes	24 August to 28 September 1970
Sundays	4:00 p.m.	60 minutes	10 January to 27 June 1971
Sundays	4:30 p.m.	30 minutes	30 January to 25 June 1972
