= Ali Bryan =

Canadian novelist, and personal trainer

- Born: Nova Scotia, Canada
- Education: Saint Mary's University; Humber College
- Website: www.alibryan.com

Alexandra Bryan is a Canadian novelist, and personal trainer. Among other honours, two of her novels have been shortlisted for the Stephen Leacock Medal for Humour.

== Early life and education ==
Bryan was born in Nova Scotia, where she graduated from Saint Mary's University, then studied creative writing under Paul Quarrington at Humber College, in Ontario.

== Career ==
Bryan began her writing career publishing short stories and essays, many of which have been nominated for awards.

Bryan published her debut novel, Roost, with Freehand Books in 2013. The novel's protagonist, Claudia, is a single mother in her 30s. Her life goes out of control following her mother's unexpected death. The novel won the 2014 Georges Bugnet Award for Fiction, and was short-listed for the Alberta Trade Fiction Book of the Year. One Book Nova Scotia selected Roost for its annual provincial reading initiative where all Nova Scotians were encouraged to read the same book at the same time.

Since releasing Roost, Bryan has published three novels for adults: The Figgs (2018), Coq (2023), and The Crow Valley Karaoke Championships (2023). She has also published two young adult novels: The Hills (2021) and Takedown (2024).

In addition to writing, Bryan is a personal trainer.

== Awards and honours ==
In 2014, One Book Nova Scotia selected Roost for its annual provincial reading initiative where all Nova Scotians were encouraged to read the same book at the same time.

In 2018, Bryan shared Alberta's Emerging Artists Award with 9 other writers.

Awards for Bryan's writing
Year	Work	Award	Result	Ref.
2010	"Asshole Homemaker"	CBC Nonfiction Prize	Longlist	
2014	"Mints After the Meal"	CBC Nonfiction Prize	Longlist	
2014	Roost	Georges Bugnet Award for Fiction	Winner	
2015	"Mints After the Meal"	Jon Whyte Memorial Essay Award	Finalist	
2016	"Let's Talk"	Jon Whyte Memorial Essay Award	Finalist	
2019	The Figgs	Stephen Leacock Memorial Medal for Humour	Shortlist	
2020	"The Big Man in Cargo Shorts"	Howard O'Hagan Award for Short Story	Winner	
2021	The Hill	Wilbur Smith Adventure Writing Prize for Best Published Novel	Longlist	
2022	"Bad Extra"	Jon Whyte Memorial Essay Award	Finalist	
2024	Coq	Stephen Leacock Memorial Medal for Humour	Shortlist	
2024	Coq	Alberta Book Publishing Award for Trade Fiction Book of the Year	Winner	

== Personal life ==
As of 2013, Bryan was married and had three children.

== Books ==
=== Adult fiction ===
- Roost. Calgary: Freehand Books. 2013. ISBN 978-1-554-81137-3.
- The Figgs. Calgary: Freehand Books. 2018. ISBN 978-1-988298-25-2.
- Coq. Calgary: Freehand Books. 2023. ISBN 978-1-990601-25-5.
- The Crow Valley Karaoke Championships. New York: Henry Holt and Company. 2023. ISBN 978-1-250-86343-0.

=== Young adult fiction ===
- The Hill. New York: Dottir Press. 2021. ISBN 978-1-948340-32-8.
- Takedown. Ferndale: Cormorant Books. 2024. ISBN 978-1-77086-740-6.
