= Sarah Mian =

Canadian writer

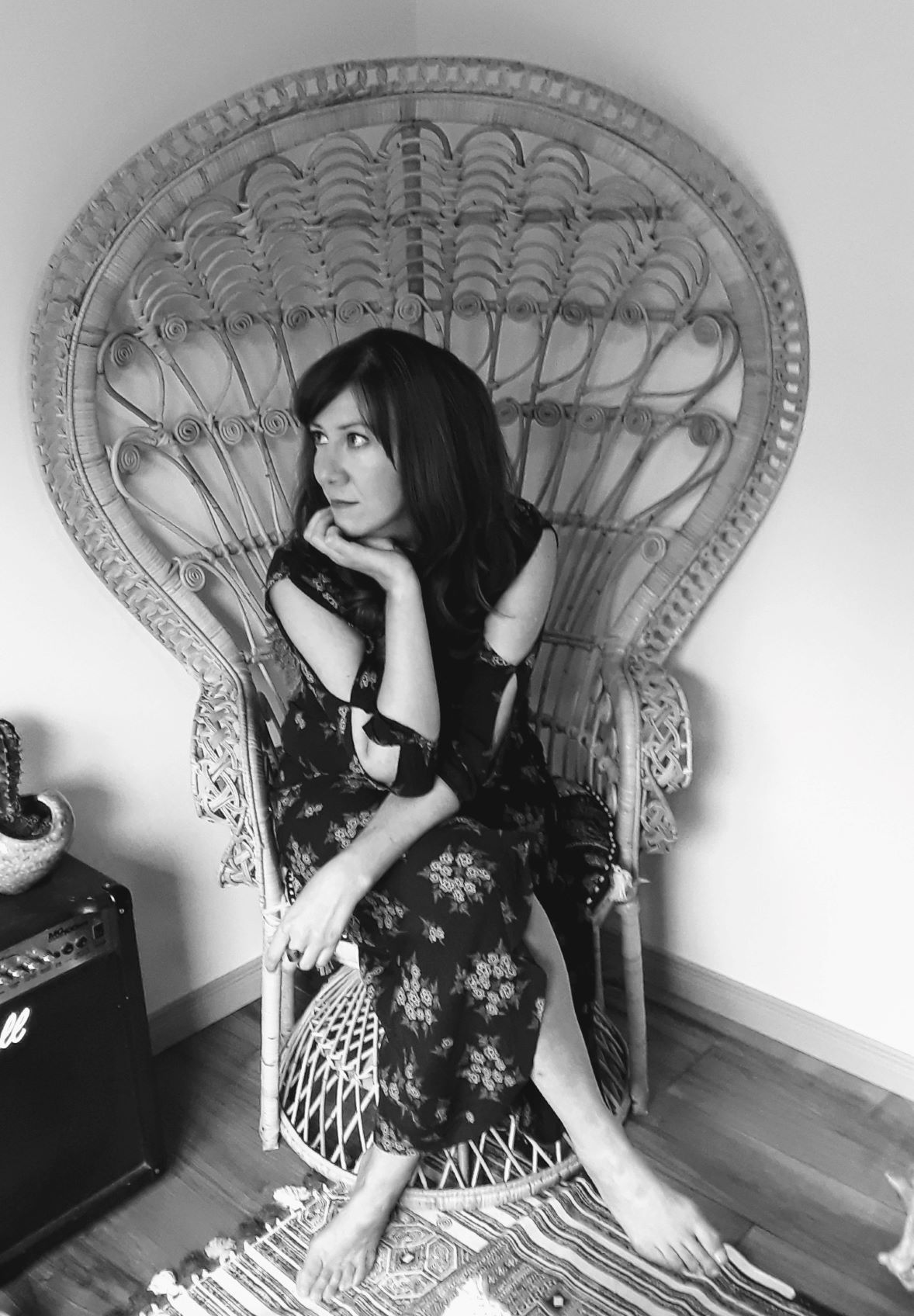
- Born: Dartmouth, Nova Scotia, Canada
- Occupations: novelist, short story writer, poet
- Writing career
- Period: 2010s–present
- Notable work: When the Saints

Sarah Mian is a Canadian writer. Her debut novel When the Saints, published in 2015, won two Atlantic Book Awards and was a top three finalist for the 2016 Stephen Leacock Award.

She has also published short stories, poetry and non-fiction work in literary and general interest magazines, and was a contributor to the CBC Radio One program Definitely Not the Opera.

Originally from Dartmouth, Nova Scotia, she is currently a resident of the rural community of Queensland in the Halifax Regional Municipality.
