= Terry Fallis =

Canadian writer

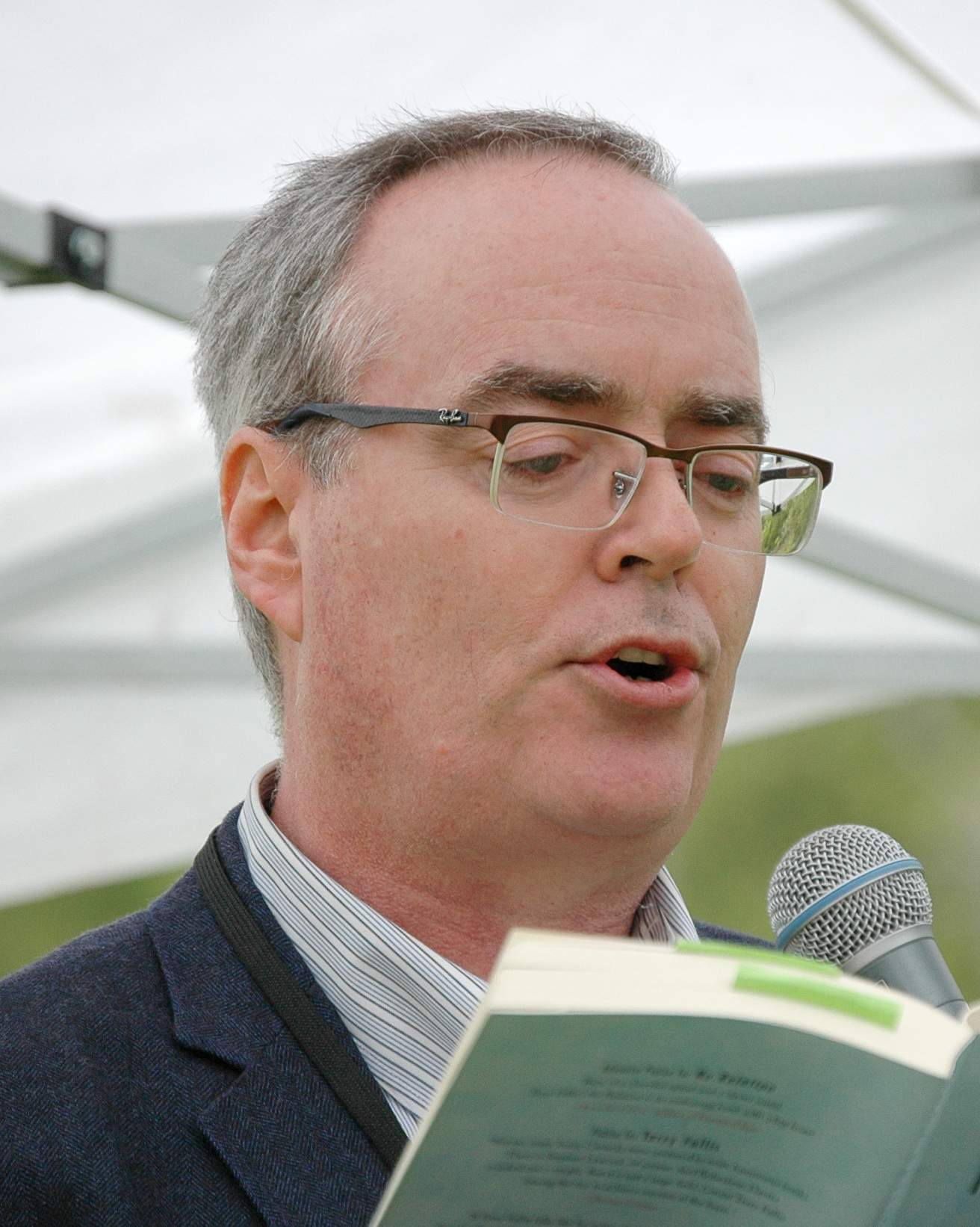
- Fallis at the Eden Mills Writers' Festival in 2013
- Born: 1959 (age 66–67)
- Occupations: Novelist; public relations consultant
- Writing career
- Period: 2000s–present
- Notable works: The Best Laid Plans; No Relation
- Website: terryfallis.com

Terry Fallis (born 1959) is a Canadian writer and public relations consultant. He is a two-time winner of the Stephen Leacock Memorial Medal for Humour, winning in 2008 for his debut novel The Best Laid Plans and in 2015 for No Relation.

The Best Laid Plans is a satire of Canadian politics, in which a burned-out political strategist's plan to terminate his own credibility and get out of politics by managing an unelectable candidate in a federal election is thrown into turmoil when the candidate becomes unexpectedly popular with the voters. Due to lack of publisher interest, Fallis originally released the entire novel, chapter by chapter, in podcast format, later turning to the print-on-demand company iUniverse to self-publish a paper edition. The podcast was subsequently picked up for broadcast on Radioropa.

Following his Leacock Medal win, Fallis signed with McClelland & Stewart (M&S), which republished The Best Laid Plans through its Douglas Gibson imprint in September 2008. He has published all his subsequent books through M&S. A sequel, The High Road, was published in September 2010 and was a finalist for the 2011 Leacock Medal. His third novel, Up and Down, debuted on The Globe and Mail Bestsellers list in September 2012. It was a finalist for the 2013 Leacock Medal and won the 2013 Ontario Library Association Evergreen Award. His fourth book, No Relation, was published by Douglas Gibson in May 2014 and won the 2015 Leacock Medal. His fifth novel, Poles Apart, was published in 2015, opened on The Globe and Mail Bestsellers list, and was again a finalist for the Leacock Medal in 2016.

The Best Laid Plans also won the 2011 edition of Canada Reads as the "essential Canadian novel of the decade", defended by journalist Ali Velshi. In 2013, CBC Television announced plans to adapt the novel into a six-part television series, The Best Laid Plans, which debuted in January 2014. The Best Laid Plans was also developed as a stage musical by Touchstone Theatre and Patrick Street Productions in Vancouver, where it enjoyed a successful run in the fall of 2015.

In June 2013, Fallis won the Libris Award for Author of the Year presented by the Canadian Booksellers Association.

Fallis attended McMaster University, where he earned a Bachelor of Mechanical and Biomedical Engineering degree and became involved in student politics, eventually becoming president of the student union. After graduating he began a career in federal politics. He is a former Liberal Party strategist, having worked on the campaign and legislative staffs of Jean Chrétien, Jean Lapierre, Robert Nixon, and Michael Ignatieff. In 1995, he co-founded Thornley Fallis, a public relations and social/digital media agency with offices in Toronto and Ottawa.

In 2014 he received the L.W. Shemilt Distinguished Engineering Alumni Award from McMaster.

== Works ==
- The Best Laid Plans (2008)
- The High Road (2010)
- Up and Down (2012)
- No Relation (2014)
- Poles Apart (2015)
- One Brother Shy (2017)
- Albatross (2019)
- Operation Angus (2021)
- A New Season (2023)
- The Marionette (2025)
- An End in Itself (2026)
