= Joey Slinger =

Canadian journalist and author

Joey Slinger (born John Edward Slinger, Jr. 1943 at Guelph, Ontario) is a Canadian journalist and author, particularly known as a long-standing humour columnist for the Toronto Star.

He first studied at Queen's University but left there after three years without completing a degree. In 1965, Slinger was hired as a reporter for the Guelph Mercury and remained there for approximately two years. He then attempted to continue his education with journalism studies at Carleton University, but was dismissed by that institution by the start of the September 1967 term. After working with The Canadian Press he joined The Globe and Mail in 1970, later in the decade transferring to the Toronto Sun where he wrote a humorous gossip column. He later credited the Sun for allowing him to establish his comedic voice in print. Eventually, he joined the Toronto Star in 1979. He remained at the Star for almost 30 years, where his humour column (no longer a gossip column) was by-lined simply as by "Slinger".

Other career highlights included terms as producer and occasional on-air host at CBC Radio.

Slinger retired from the Toronto Star in April 2008.

== Awards and recognition ==
- 1982: National Newspaper Award
- 1986: Stephen Leacock Memorial Medal for Humour, No Axe too Small to Grind

== Bibliography ==
=== Collected columns ===
- 1985: No axe too small to grind (McClelland and Stewart) ISBN 0-7710-8206-1
- 1992: If it's a jungle out there, why do I have to mow the lawn? (Key Porter Books) ISBN 1-55013-364-0

=== Non-fiction ===
- 1996: Down & Dirty Birding : Here's all the outrageous but true stuff you ever wanted to know about North American birds (Key Porter Books) ISBN 0-684-80459-X

=== Novels ===
- 2005: Punch Line (Key Porter Books) ISBN 1-55263-697-6
- 2012: Nina, The Bandit Queen (Dundurn Books) ISBN 1-4597-0138-0
