= Jane Christmas =

Canadian travel writer (born 1954)

- Born: Jane Elizabeth Grimshaw; 22 January 1954 (age 72); Hamilton, Ontario
- Education: Carleton University, Ottawa
- Occupation: Writer
- Writing career
- Period: 1990s–present
- Notable works: And Then There Were Nuns; What the Psychic told the Pilgrim; Open House: A Life in Thirty Two Moves

Jane Christmas (born 1954) is a Canadian writer from Hamilton, currently based in the UK, who was twice a nominee for the Stephen Leacock Award.

== Early life ==
Christmas was born and raised in Toronto, but spent much of her life in Hamilton, Ontario.

== Career ==
Christmas had a career as a newspaper editor and journalist, and later as a public relations manager in the public sector, before devoting her time exclusively to writing.

She was a finalist for the Stephen Leacock Memorial Medal for Humour in 2014 for And Then There Were Nuns, which chronicles a year she spent in various convents while deciding whether to marry for a third time or to take up a vocation as an Anglican nun.; and was long-listed for the same award in 2021 for Open House: A Life in Thirty Two Moves.

She has published five books of what has been categorized as travel writing but of which she prefers to call journey memoir. She was co-author of A Journey Just Begun (2015) with the Sisterhood of St. John the Divine in Toronto.

In 2025, she self-published her first novel A Flight of Saints, using the pseudonym Elizabeth Braithwaite.

=== Selected publications ===
- The Pelee Project: One Woman's Escape from Urban Madness (2002)
- What the Psychic Told the Pilgrim: A Midlife Misadventure on Spain's Camino de Santiago de Compostela (2007)
- Incontinent on the Continent: My Mother, Her Walker, and Our Grand Tour of Italy (2009)
- And Then There Were Nuns: Adventures in a Cloistered Life (2013)
- Open House: A Life in Thirty-two Moves (2020)
- A Flight of Saints (2025)

== Personal life ==
Christmas is a founding member of the Hamilton Civic League, and she remained in the city for more than 20 years. She currently lives in England.

In 2011, she was accepted as an associate with the Canadian Anglican religious community, the Sisterhood of St. John the Divine.
