= Basic Black (radio program) =

Basic Black was a long-running radio on CBC Radio hosted by Arthur Black. It was an eclectic show that mixed quirky tunes, comedic informational segments, whimsical monologues, and often humorous interviews with people from all walks of life. The focus was often on people with unusual hobbies or interests; or who had devised strange inventions; or had offbeat stories to tell of things that had happened to them. The show started in 1983, and ended its run at the end of the spring 2002 broadcast season after a 19-year run. The show was initially broadcast from Thunder Bay but moved to Toronto after several seasons and finally to Vancouver after Black moved to British Columbia in 1995.

== Format ==
Basic Black was a 90-minute show broadcast on Saturday mornings on the CBC national AM radio network (later known as CBC Radio One) from 10:00 to 11:35 (with a five-minute break at 11:00 for news and weather). Most programs were studio-based, but for some anniversary shows and other special presentations, the show was performed live in front of a theatre audience. Basic Black would usually feature an eclectic mix of offbeat songs (often folk, novelty, or blues numbers, and frequently by Canadian artists), interspersed with interviews. In the last half-hour of the show Arthur Black performed a comedic monologue, often about minor everyday frustrations, and usually with a uniquely Canadian perspective.

The show also had several popular recurring segments, including:

- "World Service" Report with George St. John Quimby: This feature had the somewhat pompous, upper-crust George St. John Quimby delivering quirky-but-genuine news items from around the world, often with a focus on particularly eccentric British news stories and performed with an exaggerated "there shall always be an England" sense of patriotism. In reality, "Quimby" was a comedic character created and performed by CBC London stringer Nigel Lewis, who also reported straight news for the CBC. The feature ran from 1983 to 1994, before Lewis left Basic Black after a potentially litigious issue over copyright.
- The Humline: From 1992 to 2002, Basic Black listeners were invited to leave a message on the Basic Black Humline, singing or humming any half-remembered tune that they couldn't quite figure out the name of. An assembled Humline panel (Arthur Black, Danny Marks, and Shelagh Rogers, later replaced by Dinah Christie) would then try to trace the songs—many of them quite obscure—that the listeners vaguely remembered from the past.

If the panel was successful, they would then either play the recording of the song, or make a version of their own—usually on occasions when all they could find was sheet music, no recordings. If stumped, the Humline panel would throw the question out to the listeners. A CD, Hits Of The Humline, was issued in 2000 with some of the panel's favourite selections. The CD featured both original recordings from the 1930s to the 1950s, and a handful of recordings by Marks, Rogers and Black of songs they recorded themselves, including the commercially recorded debut of the theme song to the 1958 CBC TV series Cannonball.

- The Dead Dog Cafe: Toward the very end of the show's run, "The Dead Dog Cafe" was a recurring feature. It was eventually spun off into The Dead Dog Cafe Comedy Hour.

The show's distinctive opening theme music was Pythagoras's Trousers by Penguin Cafe Orchestra.

This show is not related to the WGBH TV show of the same name.
