= Robert Thomas Allen =

Canadian humorist (1911–1990)

- Born: 1911; Toronto, Ontario
- Died: 1990 (aged 78–79); San Bernardino, California
- Occupation: humorist
- Writing career
- Period: 1950s-1970s
- Notable works: The Grass Is Never Greener, Wives, Children and Other Wild Life

Robert Thomas Allen (1911–1990) was a Canadian humorist, best known as a two-time winner of the Stephen Leacock Award for humour. He won the award in 1957 for The Grass Is Never Greener, and in 1971 for Wives, Children and Other Wild Life.

Born in Toronto, Ontario, Allen began his career as an advertising writer for Eaton's and Simpsons, and was a freelance contributor of humorous essays to publications such as Maclean's, Saturday Night, The Canadian, Weekend and Star Weekly. He published 14 books throughout his career, including both compilations of his essays and works of children's literature. In addition to his two Leacock Awards, he won the Ruth Schwartz Award for children's literature in 1976 for his book The Violin.

A recurring character in the work of Toronto Star editorial cartoonist Duncan Macpherson, a bespectacled "average Canadian", was originally drawn as a caricature of Allen.

Following his retirement, Allen and his family moved to Sun City, California in 1983. He died of a heart attack in San Bernardino in 1990, aged 79.
