= Cathal Kelly =

Canadian writer

Cathal Kelly is a Canadian columnist for The Globe and Mail. He won the Stephen Leacock Memorial Medal for Humour in 2019 for his childhood memoir Boy Wonders.

Kelly was born and raised in Toronto, Ontario, to immigrant parents from Ireland. He studied political science at the University of Toronto and journalism at Ryerson University, before joining the Toronto Star as a copy editor in the early 2000s. He began writing for the paper as a beat reporter covering the Toronto Blue Jays, as well as writing some automobile and travel journalism, before becoming a full-time sports columnist in 2010. He was hired by The Globe and Mail in 2014.
