= Ian Ferguson (writer) =

Canadian author and playwright

Ian Ferguson is a Canadian author and playwright.

He is the brother of journalist and author Will Ferguson, with whom he co-wrote the 2001 book How to Be a Canadian (Even If You Already Are One) and the 2023 comedic mystery novel I Only Read Murder.

Ferguson won the Stephen Leacock Award in 2004 for Village of the Small Houses, a biography and humorous look at growing up in Fort Vermilion, Alberta. He is also the author of the British Columbia Survival Guide.
