= Stuart Trueman =

Canadian writer (1911–1995)

- Born: November 6, 1911; Saint John, New Brunswick, Canada
- Died: April 23, 1995 (aged 83); Saint John, New Brunswick, Canada
- Occupations: humorist, journalist
- Spouse: Mildred Stiles
- Writing career
- Period: 1930s–1990s
- Notable work: You're Only as Old as You Act

Stuart Douglas Trueman (6 November 1911 – 23 April 1995) was a Canadian journalist and humorist, who won the Stephen Leacock Award in 1969 for his book You're Only as Old as You Act.

Born and raised in Saint John, New Brunswick, Trueman first joined the city's Telegraph-Journal newspaper after high school as a cartoonist and reporter, later becoming a sportswriter. He became the paper's editor-in-chief in 1951, holding the position until his retirement in 1971, and then continued to write a weekly column for the newspaper until 1993. During his time with the Telegraph-Journal, he covered a visit to the city by Amelia Earhart the day before her solo trans-Atlantic flight in 1932, bringing her a copy of the paper directly off the press before she left so that once she landed she could prove she had flown the whole way. He was also credited with the original discovery of Moncton's Magnetic Hill.

As a writer, Trueman published numerous books of both humour and regional history. In addition to his Leacock Award win in 1969 for You're Only as Old as You Act, he was a shortlisted nominee for the award in 1983 for Don't Let Them Smell the Lobsters Cooking.

He was married to Mildred Trueman (née Stiles), with whom he also collaborated on two cookbooks, Favourite Recipes from Old New Brunswick Kitchens (1983) and Mildred Trueman's New Brunswick Heritage Cookbook: With Age-Old Cures and Medications, Atlantic Fishermen's Weather Portents and Superstitions (1986).

He died at Saint John Regional Hospital on April 25, 1995.

== Works ==
- Cousin Elva (1955)
- The Ordeal of John Gyles: Being an Account of his Odd Adventures; Strange Deliverances, etc. as a Slave of the Maliseets (1966)
- You're Only as Old as You Act (1968)
- An Intimate History of New Brunswick (1970)
- My Life as a Rose-Breasted Grosbeak (1972)
- The Fascinating World of New Brunswick (1973)
- Ghosts, Pirates and Treasure Trove: The Phantoms that Haunt New Brunswick (1975)
- The Wild Life I've Led (1976)
- Tall Tales and True Tales from Down East: Eerie Experiences, Heroic Exploits, Extraordinary Personalities, Ancient Legends and Folklore from New Brunswick and Elsewhere in the Maritimes (1979)
- The Colour of New Brunswick (1981)
- Don't Let Them Smell the Lobsters Cooking: The Lighter Side of Growing Up in the Maritimes Long Ago (1982)
- Favourite Recipes from Old New Brunswick Kitchens (1983, with Mildred Trueman)
- Life's Odd Moments (1984)
- Mildred Trueman's New Brunswick Heritage Cookbook: With Age-Old Cures and Medications, Atlantic Fishermen's Weather Portents and Superstitions (1986, with Mildred Trueman)
- Add Ten Years to Your Life: A Canadian Humorist Looks at Florida (1989)
