= A Good Place to Come From =

Canadian television series

- Genre: Drama
- Written by: Morley Torgov
- Country of origin: Canada
- Original language: English
- No. of seasons: 1
- No. of episodes: 3

Production
- Executive producer: Robert Allen
- Producer: Robert Sherrin
- Running time: 90 minutes

Original release
- Network: CBC Television
- Release: 12 March – 26 March 1980

A Good Place To Come From is a Canadian drama television miniseries that was broadcast on CBC Television in 1980.

== Premise ==
The series was an adaptation of Morley Torgov's book, A Good Place To Come From, which depicts Jewish life in Sault Ste. Marie, Ontario.

== Production ==
The series was produced by Robert Sherrin, with the adaptation provided by Israel Horovitz.

== Episodes ==
Each 90-minute episode was broadcast on successive Wednesdays in March 1980, from 9:00 p.m.

"Today I Am A Fountain Pen", the first episode, was set in 1939 and featured the Yanover family. Parents Esther (Helen Burns) and Moise (Harvey Atkin) enjoy bacon, but do not wish Irving (Allan Levson), their son, to discover this. Meanwhile, the family maid Annie (Hollis McLaren) is a Ukrainian who is romantically involved with an Italian hockey player. Annie confides this relationship with Irving, but seeks to conceal this from others.

"In A Rosen By Any Other Name", the second episode, is set in 1943. A brick is tossed through the store window of Tailor Barney Rosen (Peter Boretski). As a result, Rosen plans to change his name to Royal. Meanwhile, his son Stanley (Jeff Lynas) will soon celebrate his bar mitzvah.

"The Chopin Playoffs" closed the series. It is set in 1948 and combines characters from the previous episodes. Stanley Rosen and Irving Yanover not only compete in a piano contest, they also compete for the affections of Fawn (Ella Collins).
