= Queensland, Nova Scotia =

Locality south of the city of Halifax, Nova Scotia, Canada

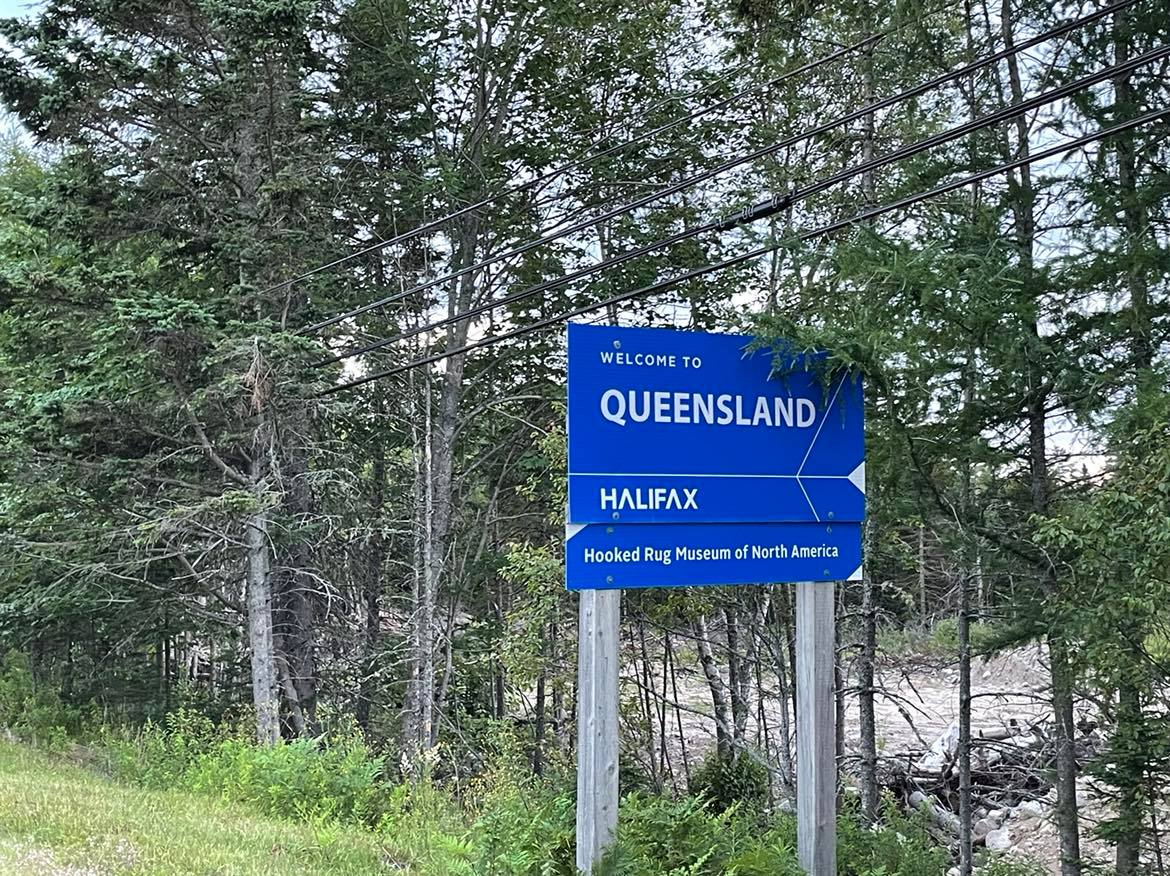
- Locality sign south of the area (2022)

- Location of Queensland in Nova Scotia
- Coordinates: 44°38′10.3″N 64°1′30.4″W
- Country: Canada
- Province: Nova Scotia
- Municipality: Halifax Regional Municipality

Government
  - Type: Regional Municipality
- Time zone: UTC−04:00 (AST)
  - Summer (DST): UTC−03:00 (ADT)
- Postal code: B0J 1T0
- Area codes: 902, 782

Queensland is a community of the Halifax Regional Municipality in the Canadian province of Nova Scotia.

About 46 kilometres (29 mi) west of Halifax, the area is on the north-western side of Saint Margaret's Bay, between Black Point to the north-east, and the nearby Hubbards community to the north-west. The area was used by the Miꞌkmaq First Nations people.

== Places of interest ==
The Rug Hooking Museum of North America is to the west of the community.

The Saint Margaret's Bay Area Rails-to-Trails follows the Nova Scotia Trunk 3 highway, part of a 33-kilometre (21 mi) multi-use recreational trail from Hubley southward to Hubbards. It reused the route of the CN Rail line.

=== Parks ===
Queensland has three of Nova Scotia's South Shore Region Parks in the vicinity:

- Cleveland Beach Provincial Park (established 1978), to the north, with a sandy beach,
- Hubbards Provincial Park, 3 kilometres (1.9 mi) from Queensland Beach Provincial Park, with a boat launch site, and
- Queensland Beach Provincial Park (established 1980), with a sandy beach.

== Historical places ==
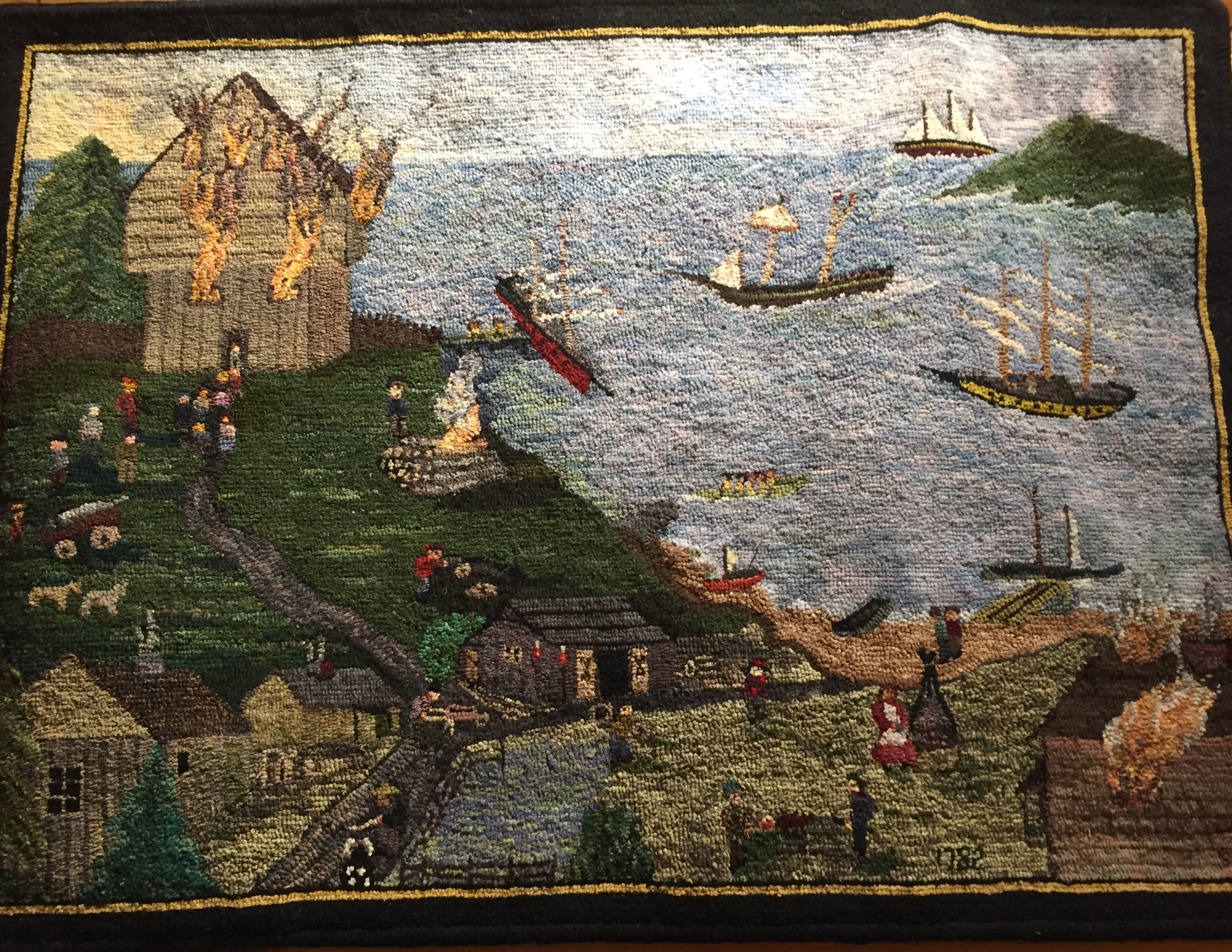
The sacking of Lunenburg, by Suzanne Conrad, Rug Hooking Museum of North America

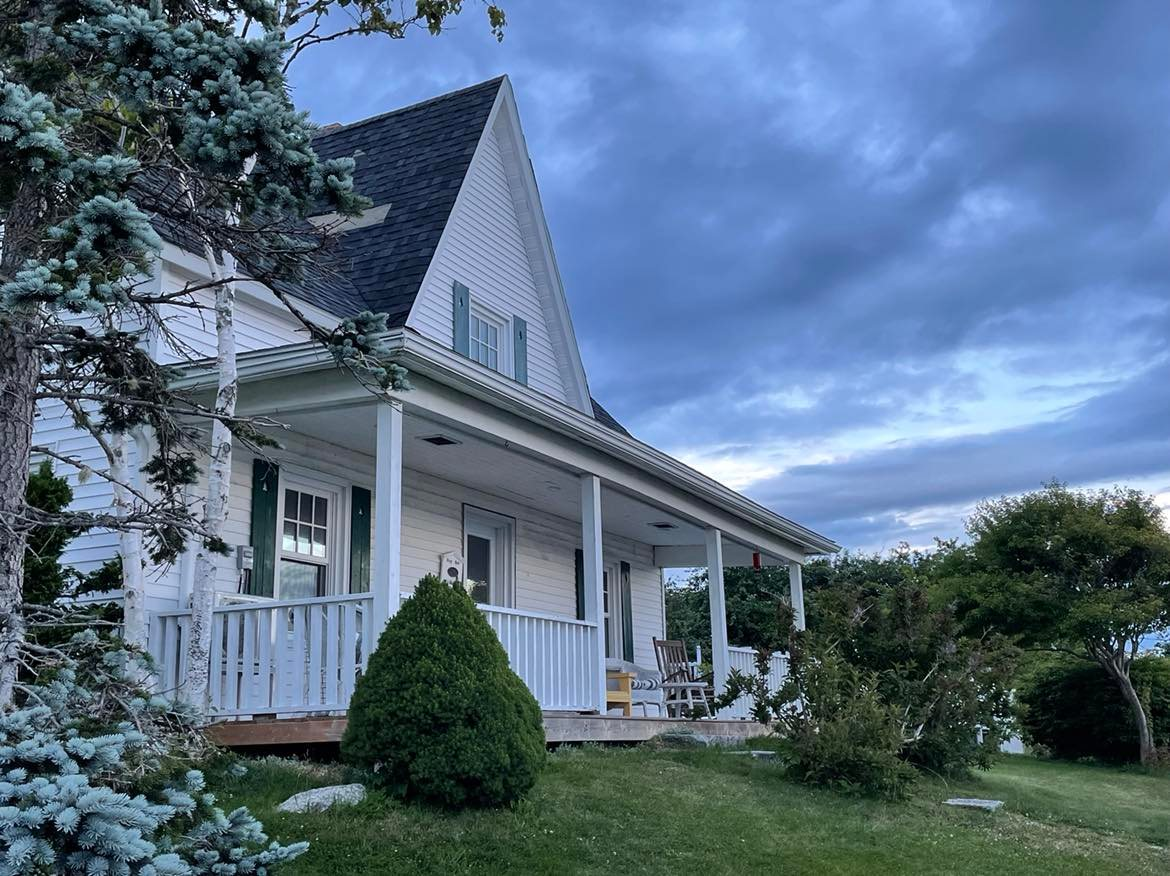
Dorey House (2022).

Dorey House, 15 Dorey Lane, was recognized in 1991 as a historic place as a one-and-a-half storey, mid-nineteenth century, single-dwelling, Gothic Revival house. Built in 1848, it was part of the Saint Margaret's Bay settlement of Foreign Protestants of Lunenburg. Set on farming land, the owners also engaged in fishing for several generations. It remained in the family until sold in 1984.

The community has two cemeteries:

- Saint Andrew's–Saint Mark's United Church Cemetery, near 8959 Saint Margaret's Bay Road (44.6484°N 64.0023°W), and
- at the former Saint John the Baptist Anglican Church.

== Notable persons ==
- Commander 'Yogi' Jensen OC RCN (ret.) (1921–2004), commander of HMCS Crusader, HMCS Micmac and HMCS Fort Erie, and the Seventh Canadian Escort Squadron. Retiring from the navy in 1964, he settled in Queensland, and wrote seven books including Tin hats, oilskins and seaboots: a naval journey, 1938–1945 (ISBN 978-1-896941-14-1), and illustrated another nine books. Jensen led the museum acquisition of HMCS Sackville (K181). He was made a Member of the Order of Canada in 2004, for helping 'to preserve the history and heritage of Atlantic Canada'.
- Sarah Mian, Canadian writer and novelist, commencing with When the Saints (2015), resident of Queensland.
- George Young (1924–2002), naval service, engineering and construction, writer. Young and his family moved to Queensland in 1956. He wrote Bluenose capers: Some humourous [sic] vignettes of life in Nova Scotia and other stories (1971), Bottoms up: More humourous [sic] vignettes of life in Nova Scotia and other stories (1976), Ghosts in Nova Scotia: Tales of the supernatural (1979), The short triangle: A story of the sea and men who go down to it in ships (1979), Ancient peoples and modern ghosts (1980), Over mulled rum: More humourous [sic] vignettes of life in Nova Scotia and other stories (1983), Who killed Surcouf: The untold story of the occupation of the Islands of Saint Pierre (1986), and Oak Island treasure.

== Gallery ==
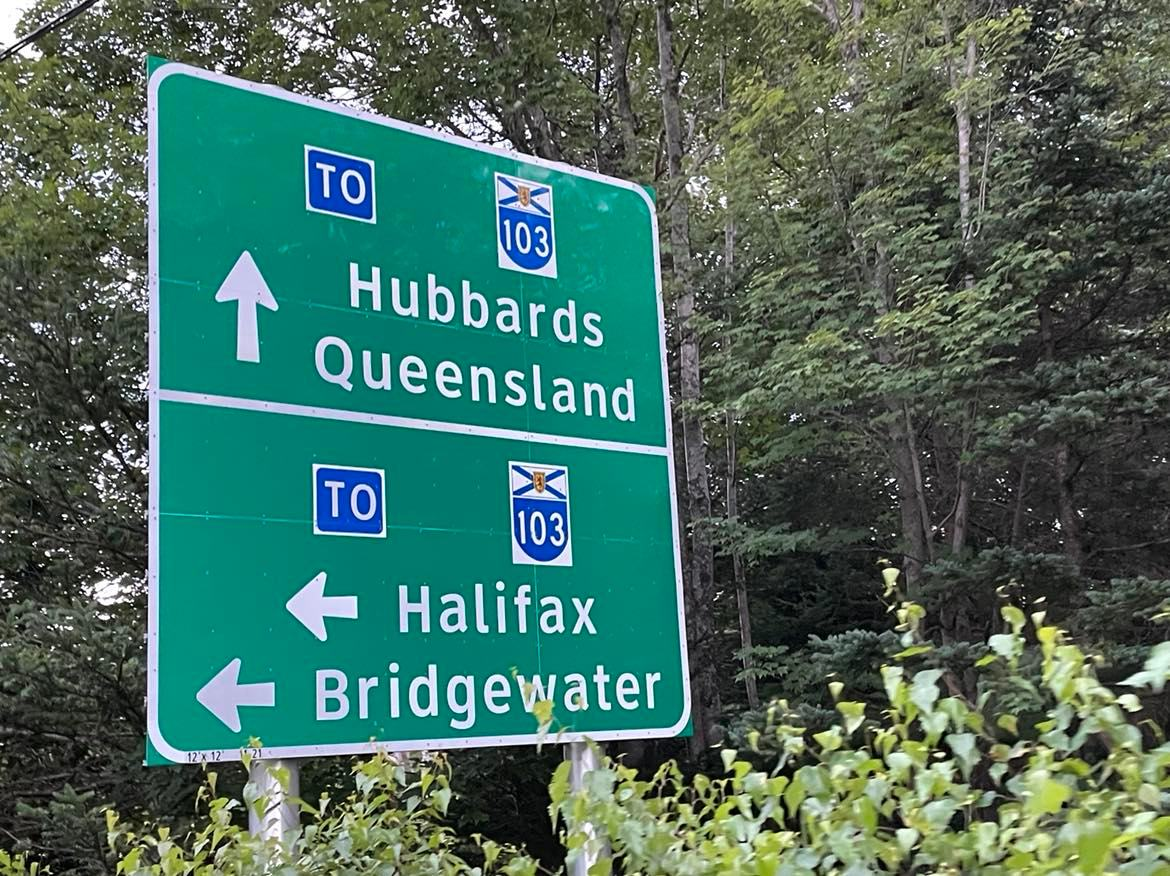
Road sign to Queensland (2022).

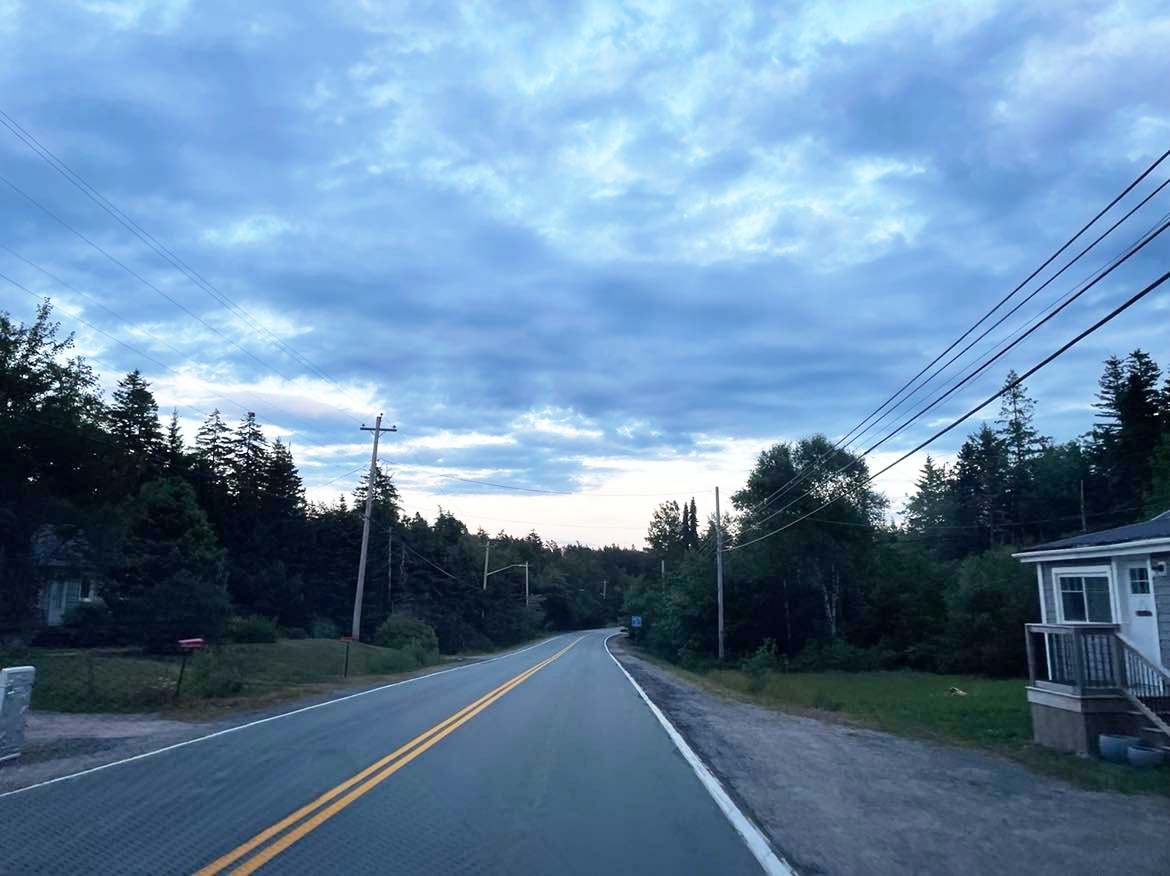
Saint Margarets Bay Road, south-western approach to Queensland (2022).
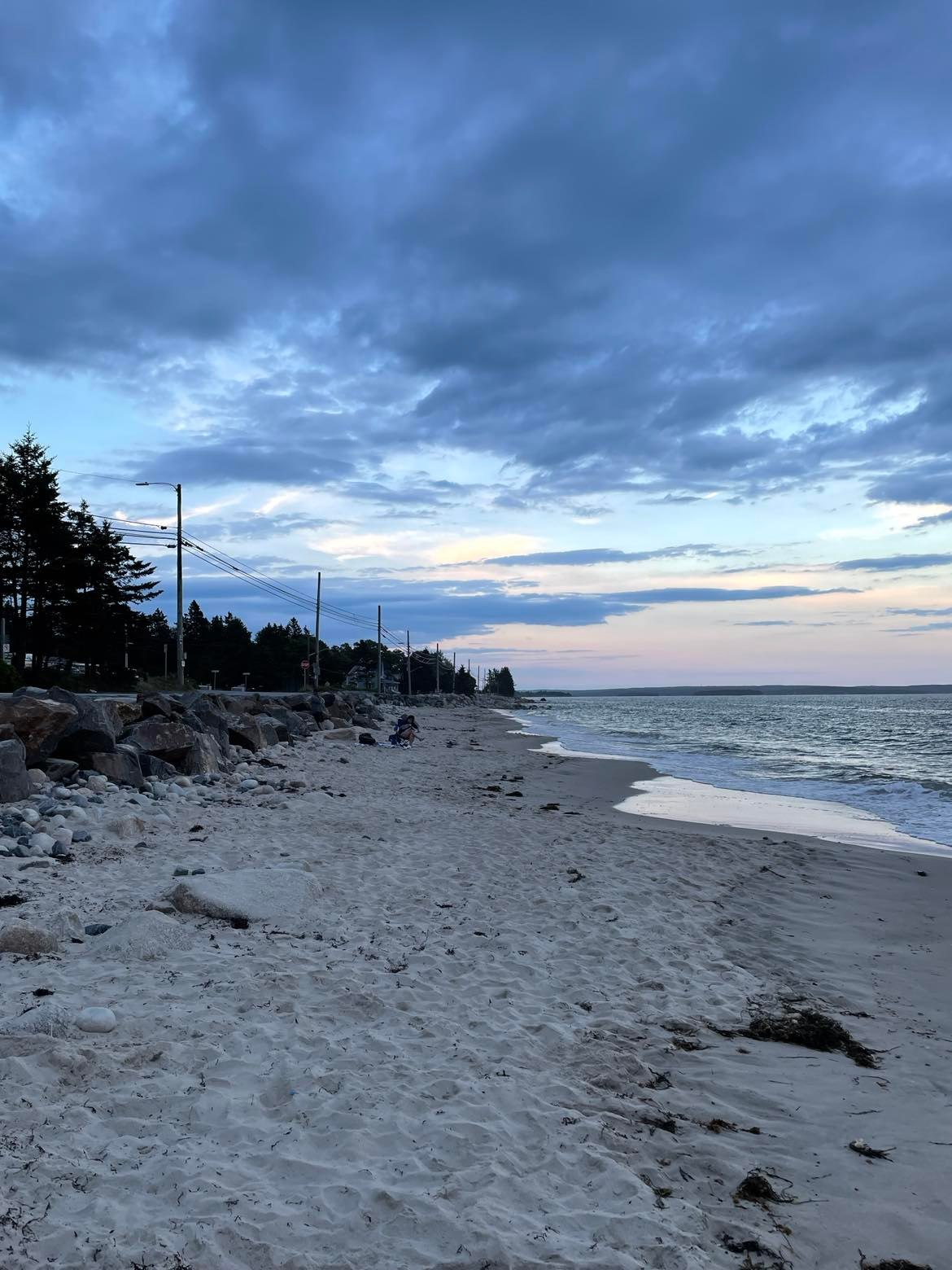
Queensland Beach, looking northward (2022).

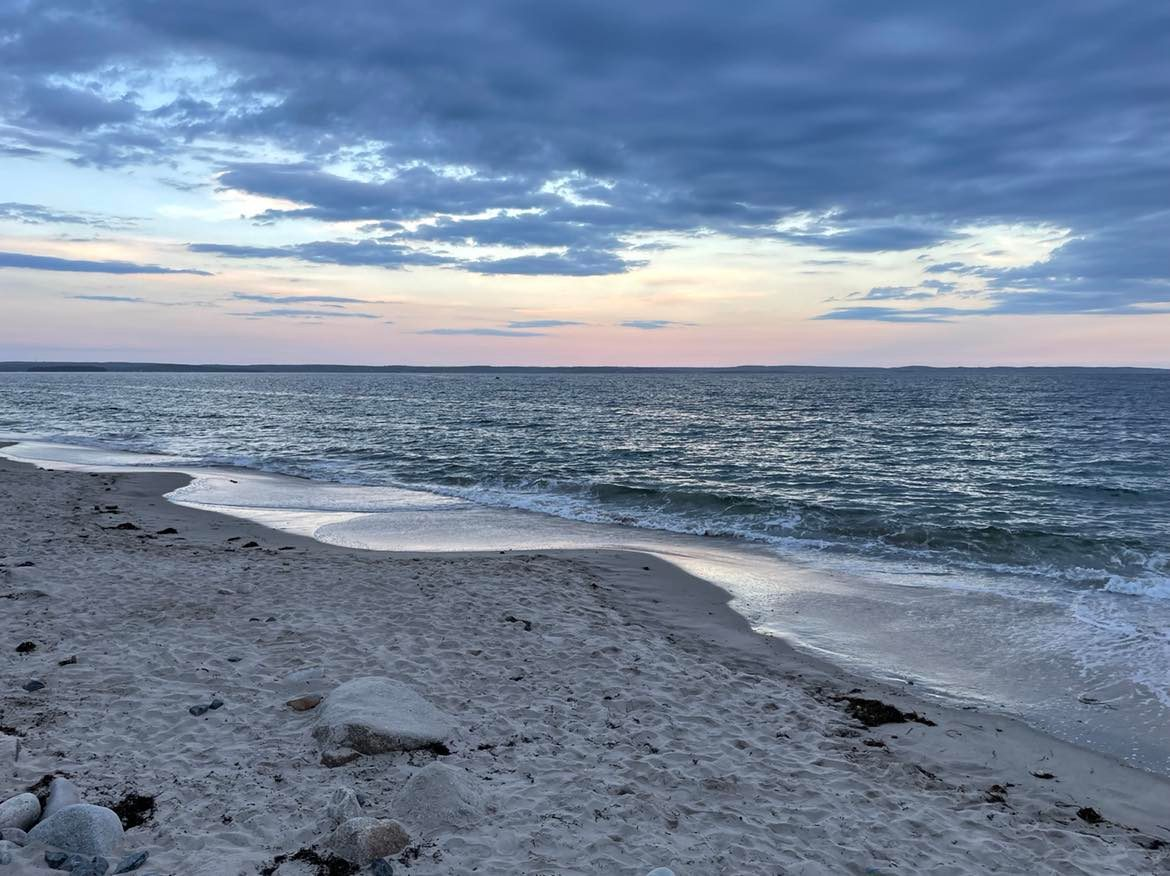
Queensland Beach, looking north-east (2022).

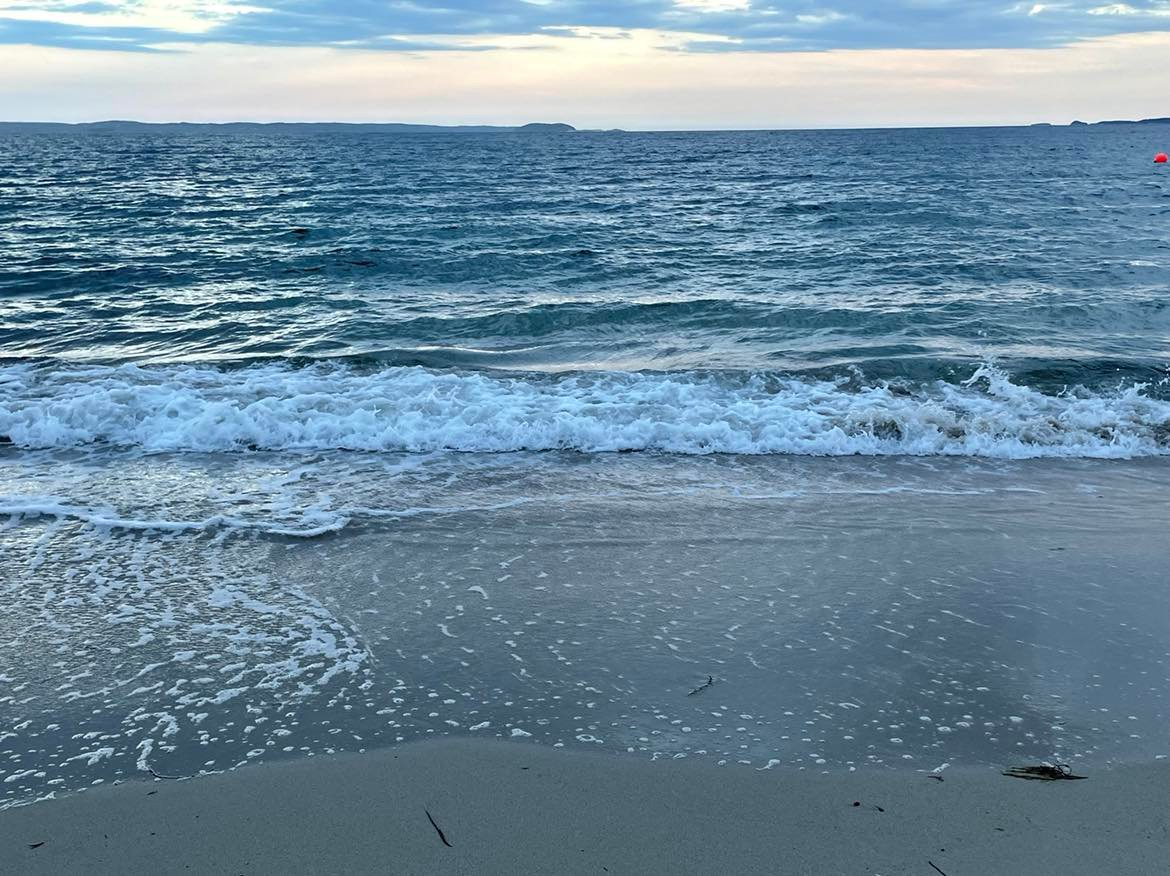
Queensland Beach, looking east (2022).

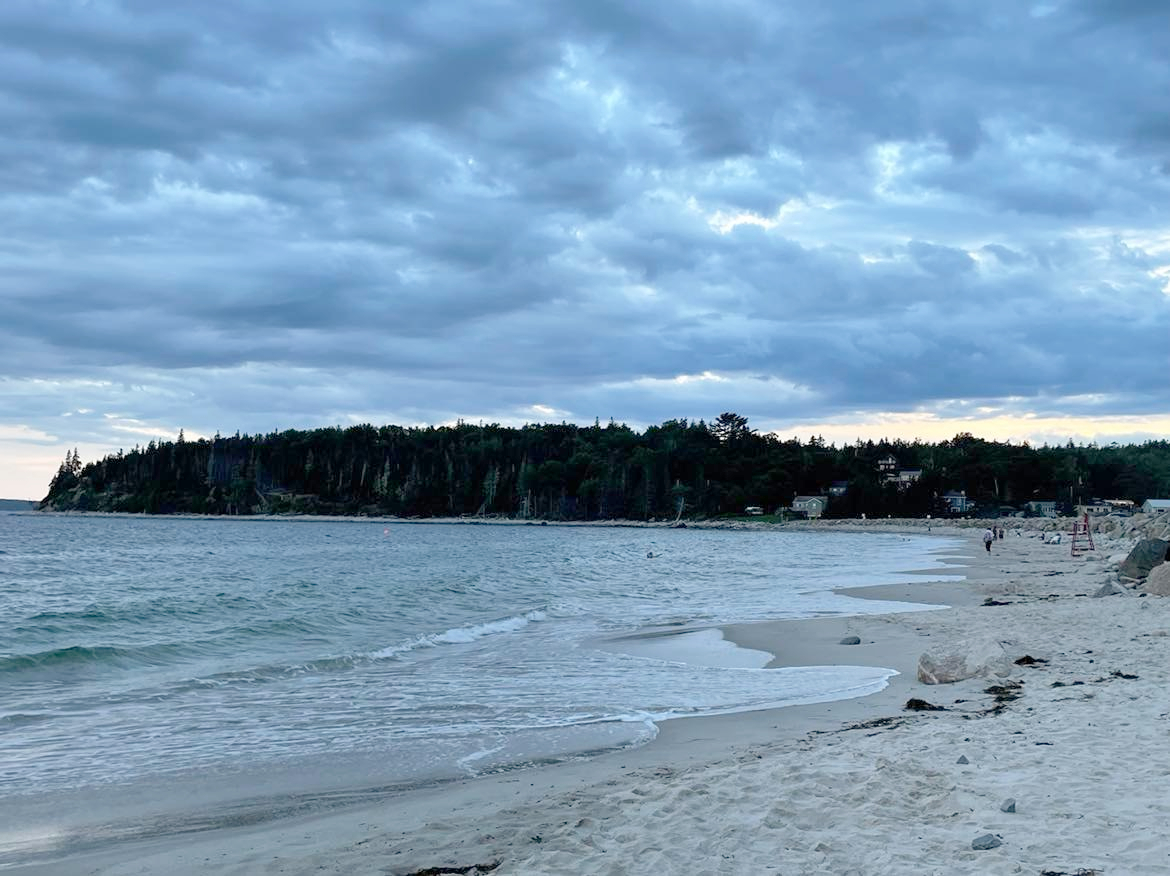
Queensland Beach, looking south-west (2022).
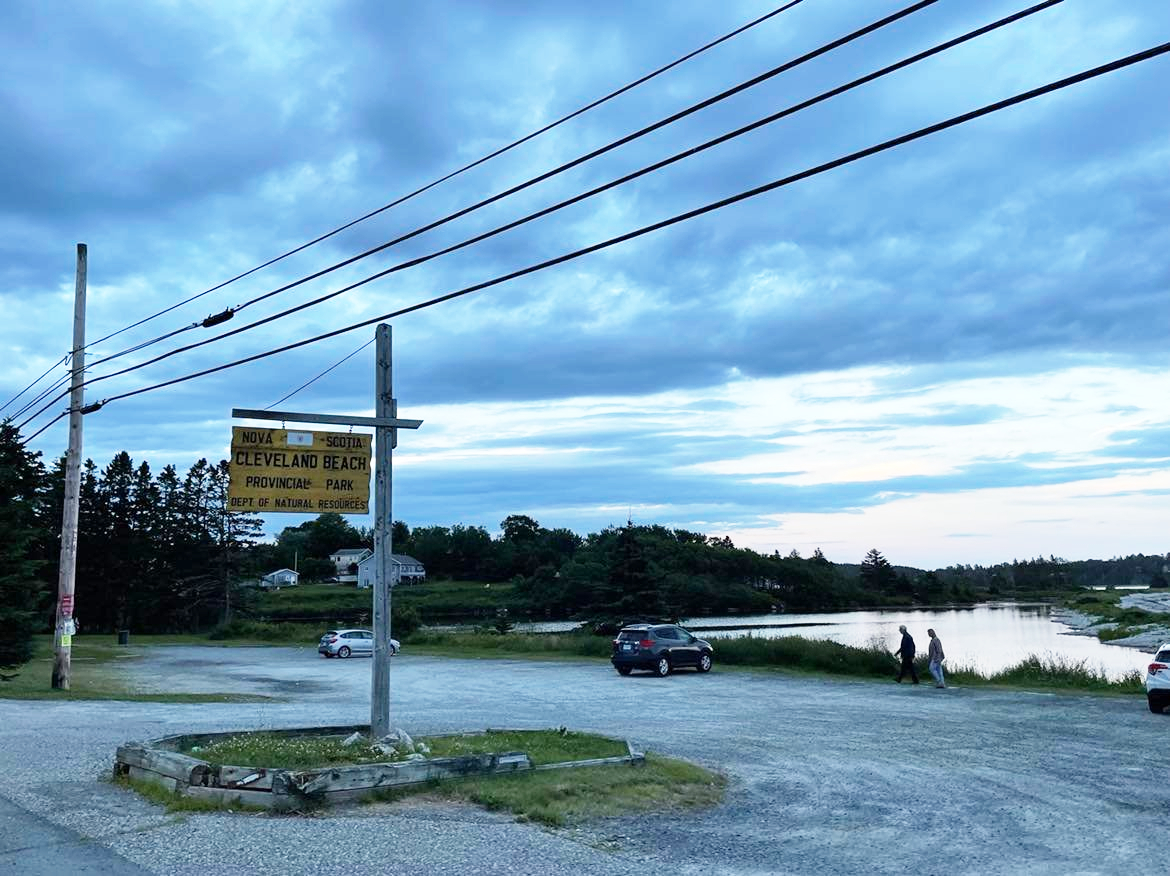
Cleveland Beach carpark (2022).

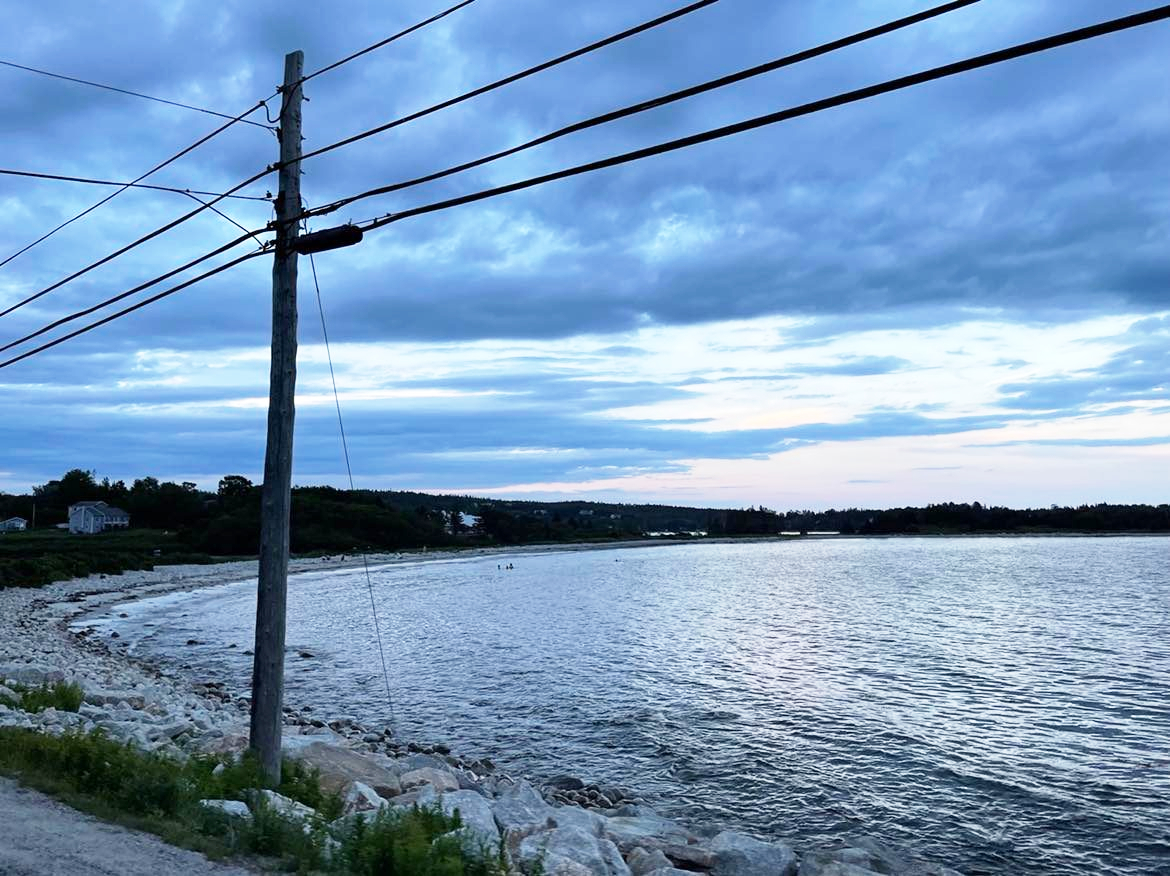
Cleveland Beach, looking north-east (2022).

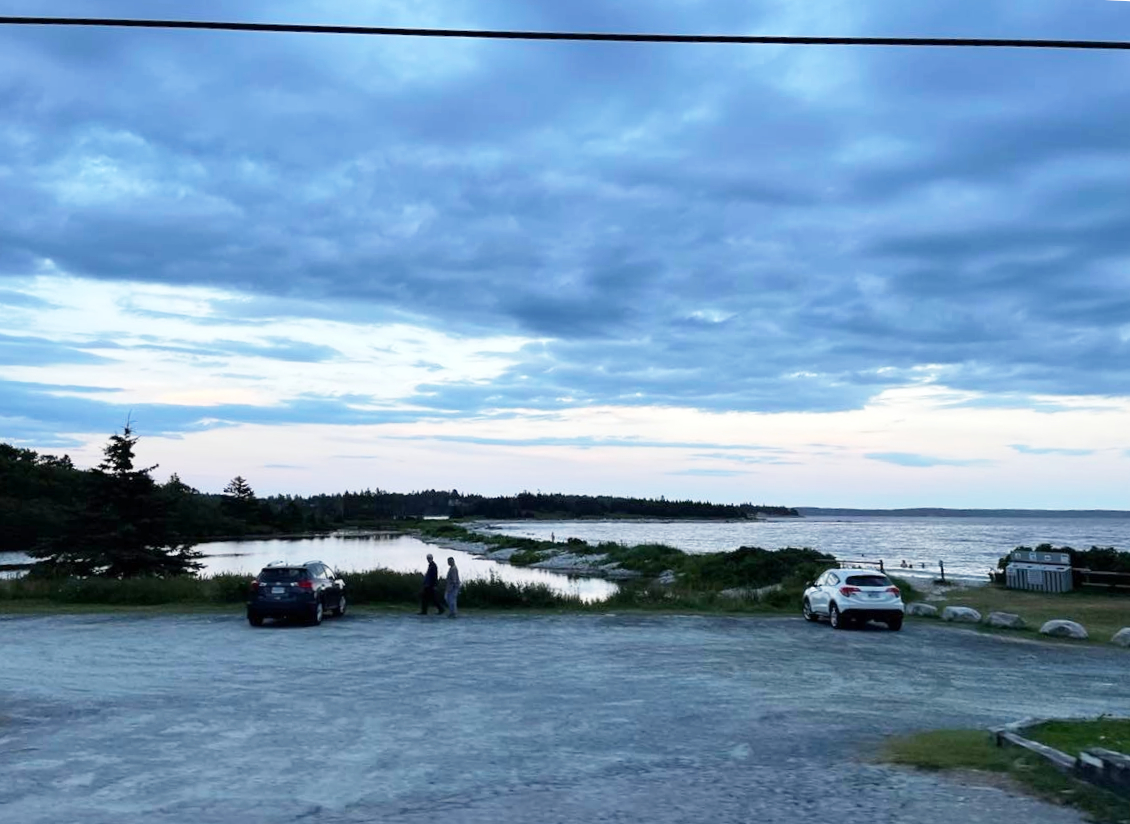
Cleveland Beach, looking east (2022).

== See also ==
- Royal eponyms in Canada
