= Will Ferguson =

Canadian travel writer and novelist

Will Ferguson AOE
- Born: William Stener Ferguson; October 12, 1964 (age 61); Fort Vermilion, Alberta, Canada
- Education: York University
- Occupation: Writer
- Writing career
- Genres: Humour; Travel; Canadian history and culture; Fiction
- Notable works: 419; Happiness™; Why I Hate Canadians; Hitching Rides with Buddha
- Website: willferguson.ca

William Stener Ferguson AOE (born October 12, 1964) is a Canadian travel writer and novelist who won the Scotiabank Giller Prize for his novel 419 (2012).

== Biography ==
Ferguson was born fourth of six children in the former fur trading post of Fort Vermilion, Alberta, approximately 800 km (500 mi) north of Edmonton.

Ferguson completed his high school education at Lindsay Thurber Comprehensive High School in Red Deer and was awarded the Alexander Rutherford Scholarships in all available categories. He then joined the Canadian government funded programs Katimavik and Canada World Youth. The latter program sent him to Ecuador in South America, as described in his book Why I Hate Canadians. He studied film production and screenwriting at York University in Toronto, graduating with a B.F.A. (Special Honours) in 1990.

Ferguson joined the JET Programme in the early 1990s, and lived in Kyushu, Japan, for five years teaching English. He married his wife, Terumi Matsumoto, in Kumamoto in 1995. While living in Asia, he travelled to China, South Korea, Indonesia and Malaysia. After moving back to Canada, he experienced a severe reverse culture shock, which became the basis for his first book, Why I Hate Canadians. He details his experiences hitchhiking across Japan in Hokkaido Highway Blues, later retitled Hitching Rides with Buddha.

== Other activities ==
Ferguson is on the board of directors of the Chawkers Foundation, which provides support for literary, artistic, environmental and educational projects.

== Personal life ==
He currently resides in Calgary, Alberta. His son Genki Ferguson is the author of the novel Satellite Love. His older brother, Ian Ferguson, won the Stephen Leacock Medal for his memoir Village of the Small Houses in 2004. Another brother, Sean Ferguson, is currently the dean of music at McGill University.

== Awards and honours ==
=== Honours ===
He received an honorary degree in English from Mount Royal University in 2016.

And in 2024, Ferguson was made a member of the Alberta Order of Excellence.

=== Literary awards ===
Year	Title	Award	Category	Result	Ref
2002	Generica (later renamed Happiness)	Stephen Leacock Memorial Medal for Humour	—	Won	
2005	Beauty Tips from Moose Jaw	Stephen Leacock Memorial Medal for Humour	—	Won	
2005	—	Governor General's History Award	Popular Media	Won	
2010	Beyond Belfast	Stephen Leacock Memorial Medal for Humour	—	Won	
2012	419	Giller Prize	—	Won	
2013	419	Libris Award	Fiction Book of the Year	Won	
2021	The Finder	Crime Writers of Canada Awards of Excellence	Novel	Won	

== Bibliography ==
=== Fiction ===
- Happiness™ (2001); originally titled Generica
- Spanish Fly (2007); published in the UK as Hustle
- 419 (2012)
- The Shoe on the Roof (2017)
- The Finder (2020)
- Officer Shimada and the Disappearing Girl (2026)

=== Miranda Abbott mysteries ===
- I Only Read Murder (2023), with Ian Ferguson
- Mystery in the Title (2024), with Ian Ferguson
- Killer on the First Page (2025), with Ian Ferguson

=== Travel ===
- The Hitchhiker's Guide to Japan (1998)
- Hokkaido Highway Blues (1998); republished in 2005 as Hitching Rides with Buddha
- Beauty Tips from Moose Jaw (2004)
- Beyond Belfast (2009)
- Road Trip Rwanda (2015)

=== Humour ===
- Why I Hate Canadians (1997)
- How to Be a Canadian (2001), with Ian Ferguson
- Canadian Pie (2011)
- Meanwhile, Back in Nokomis (2026)

=== Popular history ===
- Bastards and Boneheads (1999)
- Canadian History for Dummies (2000, revised 2005)

=== Personal memoirs ===
- I was a Teenage Katima-victim! (1998)
- Coal Dust Kisses: A Christmas Memoir (2010)

=== As editor ===
- The Penguin Anthology of Canadian Humour (2006)
