= Joseph Kertes =

Hungarian-Canadian writer

Joseph Kertes (born 1951) is a writer who escaped from Hungary with his family to Canada after the revolution of 1956.

He studied English at York University and the University of Toronto, where he was encouraged in his writing by Irving Layton and Marshall McLuhan. Kertes founded Humber College's distinguished creative writing and comedy programs. He was for 15 years Humber's Dean of Creative and Performing Arts and was a recipient of numerous awards for teaching and innovation.

His first novel, Winter Tulips, won the Stephen Leacock Memorial Medal for Humour in 1989. Boardwalk, his second novel, and two children's books, The Gift and The Red Corduroy Shirt, met with critical acclaim. Roddy Doyle said of Kertes's third novel, Gratitude (Penguin), that the story "grabbed me and wouldn't let go; I found it totally engrossing. It is a huge, sprawling novel, yet beautifully precise. Gratitude brings new life to well-known history, but the lasting strength of this wonderful book is its people, in all their flaws and glories. It is a massive achievement". Ha Jin described Gratitude as "a rich, grand novel. It reveals the complexity of human psychology and motivations. It shows the fate and the cruelty and generosity of human beings caught in the violence of history. Joseph Kertes writes with tremendous skill, strength, and passion, which make reading this book sheer pleasure. Stylistically and thematically, it is a remarkable achievement". Gratitude won a Canadian Jewish Book Award and the U.S. National Jewish Book Award for Fiction. His novel, called The Afterlife of Stars, was a New York Times Book Editor's Choice. His latest novel, Last Impressions, was nominated for a City of Toronto Book Award and was a finalist for the Stephen Leacock Memorial Medal for Humour.

Kertes is also a frequent contributor to newspapers, like The Globe and Mail, and magazines, like The Walrus. A feature of his in The Walrus, called "The Truth About Lying", was nominated for a National Magazine Award. A story of his, "Records," was a finalist for a CBC Literary Award.

Kertes was named winner of the 2017 Harbourfront Festival Prize for outstanding contribution to literature and the world of letters.

His latest novel is called Sirens. The author, Alyssa York, said of it that "Sirens is that rarest of gifts—a novel that holds the whole world. It brought home to me the glory of art, of being human, of love. It made me grateful I could read."
