= Natalie Sue =

Canadian writer

Natalie Sue is a Canadian writer from Calgary, Alberta, whose debut novel I Hope This Finds You Well was published in 2024.

In 2025, the book was shortlisted for the Amazon.ca First Novel Award, and won the Stephen Leacock Memorial Medal for Humour.
