= Trevor Cole (writer) =

Canadian novelist and journalist

- Born: Trevor William Cole; February 15, 1960 (age 66); Toronto, Ontario
- Occupations: Novelist, journalist

Trevor Cole (born Trevor William Cole on February 15, 1960) is a Canadian novelist and journalist. He has published five novels; the first two, Norman Bray in the Performance of his Life (2004) and The Fearsome Particles (2006), were nominated for the Governor General's Literary Award for Fiction and longlisted for the International Dublin Literary Award.

== Life and career ==
Trevor Cole was born on February 15, 1960, in Toronto, Ontario. His father was a theatre and television actor.

Before turning to fiction, Cole worked as a radio copywriter, magazine editor and magazine journalist. He spent 15 years at The Globe and Mail, working first as an editor and then, for the final two and a half years, as a senior writer for the Report On Business Magazine. Cole left the Globe in 2000. From 2001 to 2003, he wrote a satirical column on business for Canadian Business.

Cole has won nine National Magazine Awards, including three gold medals. He continues to write freelance for Toronto Life, Report on Business Magazine and other publications.

In 2006, Cole began the site AuthorsAloud.com, an independent library of short, recorded audio readings by Canadian authors of literary fiction and poetry.

McClelland & Stewart published his first three novels: Norman Bray in the Performance of His Life (2004), The Fearsome Particles (2006), and Practical Jean (September 2010). His third novel won the 2011 Stephen Leacock Memorial Medal for Humour.

His fourth novel, Hope Makes Love was published by Cormorant Press in fall 2015.

In 2017, he authored The Whisky King, a non-fiction account of Canada's most infamous mobster Rocco Perri.

== Personal life ==
Cole lives in Hamilton, Ontario. Cole's archives are held by the William Ready Division of Archives and Research Collections at McMaster University.

== Awards and honours ==
- 2004 Finalist, Governor General's Literary Award for Fiction (for Norman Bray)
- 2004 Longlist, International Dublin Literary Award (for Norman Bray)
- 2004 Finalist, Commonwealth Writer's Prize for Best First Book (for Norman Bray)
- 2006 Finalist, Governor General's Literary Award for Fiction (for The Fearsome Particles)
- 2006 Longlist, International Dublin Literary Award (for The Fearsome Particles)
- 2010 Shortlist, Rogers Writers' Trust Fiction Prize (for Practical Jean)
- 2011 Winner, Stephen Leacock Memorial Medal for Humour (for Practical Jean)

== Bibliography ==
=== Novels ===
- —— (2004). Norman Bray, in the Performance of His Life. Toronto: McClelland and Stewart. ISBN 9780771022623.
- —— (2006). The Fearsome Particles. Toronto: McClelland and Stewart. ISBN 9780771022609.
- —— (2010). Practical Jean. Toronto: McClelland and Stewart. ISBN 9780771023255.
- —— (2015). Hope Makes Love. Toronto: Cormorant Books. ISBN 9781770864566.
- —— (2017). The Whisky King. Toronto: Cormorant Books. ISBN 9781770867109.
