= Angeline Hango =

Canadian writer (1905–1995)

Angéline Hango
- Born: Marie-Rose Angéline Roy; February 2, 1905; Arvida, Quebec
- Died: November 9, 1995 (aged 90)
- Occupation: novelist
- Writing career
- Period: 1940s
- Notable work: Truthfully Yours

Angéline Hango (February 2, 1905 – November 9, 1995) was a Canadian writer, who won the Stephen Leacock Award in 1949 for her sole published book, Truthfully Yours.

Born Marie-Rose Angéline Roy in Arvida, Quebec, she married John Raymond Hango in 1932. She distributed Truthfully Yours under the pseudonym Angéline Bleuets, winning the Oxford-Crowell Award for unpublished manuscripts. The prize package consisted of $500 and the manuscript's publication by Oxford Press; the book was ultimately published under her real married name in 1948, and won the Stephen Leacock Award the following year. The book was a roman à clef about her childhood in the Saguenay—Lac-Saint-Jean region. In a 1970 interview with the Ottawa Citizen, Hango stated that she hadn't even considered the book to be funny at all when it won the Leacock Award, though she admitted that she more easily saw the humor in it when rereading it later in life.

After John Hango's death, she remarried to Norris "Cubby" Burke, a former radio operator in the Royal Canadian Air Force.

Although she never published another book, Hango had completed a draft manuscript, entitled Moroccan Diary, the story of her travels in Morocco in a camper, at the time of her death from a stroke in 1995.
