= Richard J. Needham =

Canadian humour columnist (1912–1996)

Jacket of best-selling Needham's Inferno.

Richard J. Needham (17 May 1912, in Gibraltar–July 1996 in Toronto) was a Canadian humour columnist for The Globe and Mail. He previously worked at the Calgary Herald.

Many of his columns were collected in a variety of books, including The Garden of Needham and Needham's Inferno, which won the Stephen Leacock Memorial Medal for Humour in 1967.

Needham also coined Mop and Pail and Grope and Flail as unflattering nicknames for his employer, both of which are still in use today. Needham was influenced by the work of H. L. Mencken, whose credited comments, especially about politicians and women, found their way into his columns. Needham spent most of his career on the Globe's editorial board.

His own bons mots, such as "Every woman needs one man in her life who is strong and responsible. Given this security, she can proceed to do what she really wants to do—fall in love with men who are weak and irresponsible", won him a following across Canada.

Needham had often expressed to The Globe and Mail staff that he wished for his death to be announced to the public with a notice reading "Richard J. Needham's tiresome and repetitious column will not appear today, because he is dead"; even though Needham had retired more than ten years before his 1996 death, his request was honoured (albeit with a note explaining that it had been Needham's idea).

According to Margaret Wente, Needham had the common touch:

The son of an army officer, he came to Canada from England when he was sixteen and claimed he had worked as a farmhand before showing up at the Toronto Star where he was hired for ten dollars a week. Despite his cranky print persona, he was a kindly man who enjoyed the company of teenage misfits with intellectual pretensions.

Regarding the persona, Wente wrote:

As Rudolf J. Needleberry or Rasputin J. Novgorod, he cultivated an alter ego of a fairly disreputable, dirty old man who rescued first-class women from second-class men, who, regrettably, rule the world… In person, Needham was neither dirty nor disreputable. He was a tall, crewcut, polite fellow who stayed married to the same wife for fifty two years. In spite of his loathing of institutions, organized religions and conventional pieties of all kinds, he was a small-c conservative who was deeply suspicious of liberal efforts to reform mankind and protect the world.

== Selected bibliography ==
- Richard J. Needham (1966). Needham's inferno. Illustrated by Duncan Macpherson. Toronto: Macmillan of Canada. pp. 197. OCLC 955443.
- Richard J. Needham (1968). The garden of Needham. Illustrated by Graham Round. Toronto: Macmillan of Canada. pp. 206. OCLC 14133.
- Richard J. Needham (1969). A friend in Needham : or, A writer's notebook. Illustrated by Randy Jones. Toronto: Macmillan of Canada. pp. 53. OCLC 98240.
- Richard J. Needham (1970). The hypodermic Needham. Illustrated by Ed Franklin. Toronto: Macmillan of Canada. p. 127. OCLC 278535.
- Richard J. Needham (1977). The wit & wisdom of Richard Needham. Illustrated by Ed Franklin. Edmonton: Hurtig. p. 110. ISBN 0-88830137-5.
- Richard J. Needham (1982). Jean Shlagbaum (ed.). You and all the rest : the wit & wisdom of Richard Needham. Illustrated by Jules Stauber. Toronto: M. Sutkiewicz Pub. p. 128. ISBN 0-91979500-5.
