= Stephen Leacock Memorial Medal for Humour =

Annual Canadian literary award

The Stephen Leacock Memorial Medal for Humour, also known as the Stephen Leacock Medal for Humour or just the Leacock Medal, is an annual Canadian literary award presented for the best book of humour written in English by a Canadian writer, published or self-published in the previous year. The silver medal, designed by sculptor Emanuel Hahn, is a tribute to well-known Canadian humorist Stephen Leacock (1869–1944) and is accompanied by a cash prize of CA$25,000. It is presented in the late spring or early summer each year, during a banquet ceremony in or near Leacock’s hometown of Orillia, Ontario.

The medal is one of the oldest literary prizes in Canada and is the only one awarded to a work of humour. It has been awarded every year since 1947 with the exception of 1959 when it was reported that no worthy entries had been submitted.

== History ==
The Stephen Leacock Associates, the non-profit organising body behind the award, was founded in 1946 by a loose group of Leacock’s friends and supporters. Although administered and presented separately today, the award was announced as part of the Governor General's Awards in its early years.

Each year the Associates’ board of directors appoints a panel of suitable judges from around the country, and also commissions readers who rank and select from submitted works a long list of ten books, which is later narrowed to a short list of three books (previously five). The shortlist is typically announced in early May. In 1990, for the only time in the award's history they did not whittle the initial longlist down to a shortlist but simply announced a shortlist of ten books which were all considered for the final award.

The cash prize began in 1970, as a $2,500 award co-sponsored by Manulife Insurance and the Hudson's Bay Company. The following decades saw gradual increases in the amount of the prize under a number of sponsors, reaching its current value of $15,000 in 2009, sponsored by the TD Bank Financial Group. As of 2018, both remaining shortlist authors each receive cash prizes of $3,000.

In 1969 the Associates established a quarterly newsletter called The Newspacket to commemorate the centenary of the author’s birth. The publication printed excerpts from nominated books and showcased Canadian humour writing. More recently, the Associates have communicated through its newsletter Leacock Matters.

In 1977 the group established an annual Student Award for Humour, which honours and encourages young Canadian writers from secondary and post-secondary levels with recognition and cash prizes for the top three.

== Organization ==
The Leacock Award is ceremonially led by a past winner or nominee, who holds the honorary title "Mayor of Mariposa". The duties of this position include giving a speech at the awards ceremony, and representing the Leacock Foundation in other public appearances including McGill University's annual Leacock Lecture. Held by Dan Needles until 2018, the position was taken over by Drew Hayden Taylor in 2019 and renamed "Grand Chief of Mariposa" to reflect Taylor's First Nations heritage. Subsequently, the 2011 Leacock Medal winner Trevor Cole served as the Honorary Mayor for two years with the 1993 medalist John Levesque selected to assume the post in 2025.

== The Medal ==
The medal, cast in silver and designed by Canadian sculptor Emanuel Hahn, is two inches (5.08 cm) in diameter and approximately 0.125 inches (.32 cm) thick. It weighs 3.125 ounces (88.59 g).

On the obverse is a profile of Stephen Leacock’s head and the dates of his lifespan (1869–1944). The words "Stephen Leacock Memorial Medal Founded 1946" are worked around the perimeter.

The reverse side features the words "Orillia “The Sunshine Town” Award for Canadian Humour". A jolly face represents the sun resting on waves, and the latitude and longitude of Orillia, Ontario, Canada, appear in small figures at the top. Two small fish swim beneath the waves, and two large mosquitoes are depicted — one on the sun, the other in the water. Below the design, there is room for the winner’s name and date to be inscribed, and below that a small maple leaf emblem.

== Winners and nominees ==
=== 1940s ===
| Year | Writer | Title | Ref. |
|---|---|---|---|
| 1947 | Harry L. Symons | Ojibway Melody | |
| 1948 | Paul Hiebert | Sarah Binks | |
| 1949 | Angeline Hango | Truthfully Yours | |

=== 1950s ===
| Year | Writer | Title | Ref. |
|---|---|---|---|
| 1950 | Earle Birney | Turvey | |
| 1951 | Eric Nicol | The Roving I | |
| 1952 | Jan Hilliard | The Salt Box | |
| 1953 | Lawrence Earl | The Battle of Baltinglass | |
| 1954 | Joan Walker | Pardon My Parka | |
| 1955 | Robertson Davies | Leaven of Malice | |
| 1956 | Eric Nicol | Shall We Join the Ladies? | |
| 1957 | Robert Thomas Allen | The Grass Is Never Greener | |
| 1958 | Eric Nicol | Girdle Me a Globe | |
| 1959 | No award given | | |

=== 1960s ===
| Year | Writer | Title | Ref. |
|---|---|---|---|
| 1960 | Pierre Berton | Just Add Water and Stir | |
| 1961 | Norman Ward | Mice in the Beer | |
| 1962 | W. O. Mitchell | Jake and the Kid | |
| 1963 | Donald Jack | Three Cheers for Me | |
| 1964 | Harry J. Boyle | Homebrew and Patches | |
| 1965 | Gregory Clark | War Stories | |
| 1966 | George Bain | Nursery Rhymes to be Read Aloud by Young Parents with Old Children | |
| 1967 | Richard J. Needham | Needham's Inferno | |
| 1968 | Max Ferguson | And Now...Here's Max | |
| 1969 | Stuart Trueman | You're Only as Old as You Act | |

=== 1970s ===
| Year | Writer | Title | Ref. |
|---|---|---|---|
| 1970 | Farley Mowat | The Boat Who Wouldn't Float | |
| 1971 | Robert Thomas Allen | Children, Wives and Other Wild Life | |
| 1972 | Max Braithwaite | The Night We Stole the Mountie's Car | |
| 1973 | Donald Bell | Saturday Night at the Bagel Factory | |
| 1974 | Donald Jack | That's Me in the Middle | |
| 1975 | Morley Torgov | A Good Place to Come From | |
| 1976 | Harry J. Boyle | The Luck of the Irish | |
| 1977 | Ray Guy | That Far Greater Bay | |
| 1978 | Ernest Buckler | Whirligig | |
| 1979 | Sondra Gotlieb | True Confections | |

=== 1980s ===
Winners and shortlisted candidates of the Stephen Leacock Medal for Humour
| Year | Writer | Title | Ref. |
|---|---|---|---|
| 1980 | Donald Jack | Me Bandy, You Cissie | |
| 1981 | Gary Lautens | Take My Family...Please! | |
| 1982 | Mervyn Huston | Gophers Don't Pay Taxes | |
| 1983 | Morley Torgov | The Outside Chance of Maximilian Glick | |
| 1983 | Aislin | Stretch Marks | |
| 1983 | John Duffie | Duffie's Unimportance of Being Earnest | |
| 1983 | Allan Fotheringham | Malice in Blunderland | |
| 1983 | Stuart Trueman | Don't Let Them Smell the Lobsters Cooking | |
| 1984 | Gary Lautens | No Sex Please...We're Married | |
| 1984 | Donald Jack | Me Too | |
| 1984 | Eric Nicol | Canadide | |
| 1984 | Paul Quarrington | Home Game | |
| 1984 | Leon Rooke | Shakespeare's Dog | |
| 1984 | Paul St. Pierre | Smith and Other Events | |
| 1985 | Ted Allan | Love Is a Long Shot | |
| 1985 | Joan Finnigan | Laughing All the Way Home | |
| 1985 | John MacLachlan Gray | Dazzled! | |
| 1985 | Don Lemna | A Visit from Mr. Lucifer | |
| 1985 | Ted Stone | Hailstorms and Hoop Snakes | |
| 1985 | Armin Wiebe | The Salvation of Yasch Siemens | |
| 1986 | Joey Slinger | No Axe Too Small to Grind | |
| 1986 | Charles Gordon | The Governor General's Bunny Hop | |
| 1986 | Sondra Gotlieb | Wife Of... | |
| 1986 | Ray Guy | This Dear and Fine Country | |
| 1986 | T. P. Millar | Who's Afraid of Sigmund Freud | |
| 1986 | Paul Quarrington | The Life of Hope | |
| 1987 | W. P. Kinsella | The Fencepost Chronicles | |
| 1987 | Christie Blatchford | Spectator Sports | |
| 1987 | Alan Edmonds | Living It Up and Down | |
| 1987 | Allan Fotheringham | Capitol Offenses | |
| 1987 | Murray Malcolm | Armchair Will: The Musings of a Man of Leisure | |
| 1987 | Eric Nicol | The U.S. or US? | |
| 1988 | Paul Quarrington | King Leary | |
| 1988 | Arthur Black | Back to Black | |
| 1988 | Lesley Choyce | An Avalanche of Ocean | |
| 1988 | Jack Hodgins | The Honorary Patron | |
| 1988 | Robin Skelton | The Parrot Who Could | |
| 1989 | Joseph Kertes | Winter Tulips | |
| 1989 | Christie Blatchford | Close Encounters | |
| 1989 | Alison Gordon | The Dead Pull Hitter | |
| 1989 | David McFadden | A Trip Around Lake Ontario | |
| 1989 | Edward O. Phillips | Hope Springs Eternal | |
| 1989 | Kent Thompson | Married Love | |

=== 1990s ===
Winners and shortlisted candidates of the Stephen Leacock Medal for Humour
| Year | Writer | Title | Ref. |
|---|---|---|---|
| 1990 | W. O. Mitchell | According to Jake and the Kid | |
| 1990 | Arthur Black | That Old Black Magic | |
| 1990 | Don Hunter | Spinner's Inlet | |
| 1990 | W. P. Kinsella | The Miss Hobbema Pageant | |
| 1990 | Susan Musgrave | Great Musgrave | |
| 1990 | Dan Needles | Letters from Wingfield Farm | |
| 1990 | Eric Nicol | Dickens of the Mounted | |
| 1990 | Paul Quarrington | Whale Music | |
| 1990 | Paul St. Pierre | Chilcotin and Beyond | |
| 1990 | Larry Zolf | Scorpions for Sale | |
| 1991 | Howard White | Writing in the Rain | |
| 1991 | Maurice Henrie | The Mandarin Syndrome | |
| 1991 | Roy MacGregor | Quantity Time | |
| 1991 | W. O. Mitchell | Roses Are Difficult Here | |
| 1991 | Morley Torgov | St. Fab's Day | |
| 1992 | Roch Carrier | Prayers of a Very Wise Child | |
| 1992 | Eliza Clark | Miss You Like Crazy | |
| 1992 | W. P. Kinsella | Box Socials | |
| 1993 | John Levesque | Waiting for Aquarius | |
| 1993 | Margaret Atwood | Good Bones | |
| 1993 | Marni Jackson | The Mother Zone | |
| 1993 | Joey Slinger | If It's a Jungle Out There, Why Do I Have to Mow the Lawn? | |
| 1994 | Bill Richardson | Bachelor Brothers Bed and Breakfast | |
| 1994 | Arthur Black | Black by Popular Demand | |
| 1994 | Charles Gordon | How Not to Be Too Bad | |
| 1994 | Peter Gzowski | Canadian Living | |
| 1994 | W. O. Mitchell | The Black Bonspiel of Wullie MacCrimmon | |
| 1995 | Josh Freed | Fear of Frying and Other Fax of Life | |
| 1995 | Aislin and Hubie Bauch | Put Up or Shut Up | |
| 1995 | Gail Anderson-Dargatz | The Miss Hereford Stories | |
| 1995 | Des Kennedy | Wild About Gardening | |
| 1995 | Susan Musgrave | Musgrave Landing | |
| 1996 | Marsha Boulton | Letters from the Country | |
| 1996 | Allan Abel | Flatbush Odyssey | |
| 1996 | W. P. Kinsella | The Winter Helen Dropped By | |
| 1996 | Eve McBride | Dandelions Help | |
| 1996 | Bill Richardson | Bachelor Brothers Bed and Breakfast Pillow Book | |
| 1997 | Arthur Black | Black in the Saddle Again | |
| 1997 | David Eddie | Chump Change | |
| 1997 | Des Kennedy | The Garden Club | |
| 1997 | Bill Richardson | Bachelor Brothers' Bedside Companion | |
| 1997 | Miriam Toews | Summer of My Amazing Luck | |
| 1998 | Mordecai Richler | Barney's Version | |
| 1998 | Paul Quarrington | The Boy on the Back of the Turtle | |
| 1998 | Sandra Shamas | A Trilogy of Performances | |
| 1998 | Carol Shields | Larry's Party | |
| 1998 | Antanas Sileika | Buying on Time | |
| 1999 | Stuart McLean | Home from the Vinyl Cafe | |
| 1999 | Wayne Johnston | The Colony of Unrequited Dreams | |
| 1999 | Sean Kane | Virtual Freedom | |
| 1999 | Robert Kroetsch | The Man from the Creeks | |
| 1999 | Pete McCormack | Understanding Ken | |

=== 2000s ===
Winners and shortlisted candidates of the Stephen Leacock Medal for Humour
| Year | Writer | Title | Ref. |
|---|---|---|---|
| 2000 | Arthur Black | Black Tie and Tales | |
| 2000 | Herb Curtis | Luther Corhern's Salmon Camp Chronicles | |
| 2000 | David Eddie | Housebroken: Confessions of a Stay-at-Home Dad | |
| 2000 | Gordon Kirkland | Justice Is Blind, and Her Dog Just Peed in my Cornflakes | |
| 2000 | Alan R. Wilson | Before the Flood | |
| 2001 | Stuart McLean | Vinyl Cafe Unplugged | |
| 2001 | Linwood Barclay | Last Resort | |
| 2001 | Lynn Coady | Play the Monster Blind | |
| 2001 | Bob Collins | Out Standing in their Field: The Rural Adventures of Hap & Edna | |
| 2001 | Allan Stratton | The Phoenix Lottery | |
| 2002 | Will Ferguson | Generica | |
| 2002 | David Arnason | King Jerry | |
| 2002 | Ian Ferguson and Will Ferguson | How to Be a Canadian (Even If You Already Are One) | |
| 2002 | Charles Gordon | The Grim Pig | |
| 2002 | Bill Richardson | Waiting for Gertrude | |
| 2003 | Dan Needles | With Axe and Flask: A History of Persephone Township From Pre-Cambrian Times to the Present | |
| 2003 | Sondra Gotlieb | Dogs, Houses, Gardens, Food and Other Addictions | |
| 2003 | Ian McGillis | A Tourist's Guide to Glengarry | |
| 2003 | Robert G. Nielsen | Athlete's Foot, or How I Failed at Sports | |
| 2003 | Morley Torgov | Stickler and Me | |
| 2004 | Ian Ferguson | Village of the Small Houses: A Memoir of Sorts | |
| 2004 | Michel Basilières | Black Bird | |
| 2004 | George Bowering | Stone Country | |
| 2004 | Stuart McLean | Vinyl Cafe Diaries | |
| 2004 | Patricia Pearson | Playing House | |
| 2005 | Will Ferguson | Beauty Tips from Moose Jaw | |
| 2005 | Arthur Black | Black and White and Read All Over | |
| 2005 | Bob Collins | Summer of Wonder | |
| 2005 | Susan Juby | Miss Smithers | |
| 2005 | Gordon Kirkland | Never Stand Behind a Loaded Horse | |
| 2006 | Arthur Black | Pitch Black | |
| 2006 | Joe Campbell | Take Me Out to the Ball Game | |
| 2006 | Gordon Kirkland | When My Mind Wanders It Brings Back Souvenirs | |
| 2006 | Dan Needles | Wingfield's Hope: More Letters from Wingfield Farm | |
| 2006 | William Weintraub | Crazy About Lili | |
| 2007 | Stuart McLean | Secrets from the Vinyl Cafe | |
| 2007 | Douglas Coupland | jPod | |
| 2007 | Des Kennedy | The Passionate Gardener | |
| 2007 | Ryan Knighton | Cockeyed | |
| 2007 | Neil McKinnon | Tuckahoe Slidebottle | |
| 2008 | Terry Fallis | The Best Laid Plans | |
| 2008 | Douglas Coupland | The Gum Thief | |
| 2008 | Will Ferguson | Spanish Fly | |
| 2008 | Scott Gardiner | King John of Canada | |
| 2008 | Ron Wood | And God Created Manyberries | |
| 2009 | Mark Leiren-Young | Never Shoot a Stampede Queen: A Rookie Reporter in the Cariboo Country | |
| 2009 | William Deverell | Kill All the Judges | |
| 2009 | Sheree Fitch | Kiss the Joy as It Flies | |
| 2009 | Jack McLeod | Uproar | |
| 2009 | Charles Wilkins | In the Land of Long Fingernails | |

=== 2010s ===
Winners and shortlisted candidates of the Stephen Leacock Medal for Humour
| Year | Writer | Title | Ref. |
|---|---|---|---|
| 2010 | Will Ferguson | Beyond Belfast: A 560-Mile Walk Across Northern Ireland on Sore Feet | |
| 2010 | Kathryn Borel | Corked | |
| 2010 | Glen Chilton | The Curse of the Labrador Duck | |
| 2010 | Bill Conall | The Rock in the Water | |
| 2010 | William Deverell | Snow Job | |
| 2011 | Trevor Cole | Practical Jean | |
| 2011 | Todd Babiak | Toby: A Man | |
| 2011 | Terry Fallis | The High Road | |
| 2011 | David Rakoff | Half Empty | |
| 2011 | Steve Smith | Red Green's How to Do Everything | |
| 2012 | Patrick deWitt | The Sisters Brothers | |
| 2012 | Rupinder Gill | On the Outside Looking Indian | |
| 2012 | Susan Juby | The Woefield Poultry Collective | |
| 2012 | Shari Lapena | Happiness Economics | |
| 2012 | Robyn Michele Levy | Most of Me | |
| 2013 | Cassie Stocks | Dance, Gladys, Dance | |
| 2013 | Terry Fallis | Up and Down | |
| 2013 | Jonathan Goldstein | I'll Seize the Day Tomorrow | |
| 2013 | Andrew Kaufman | Born Weird | |
| 2013 | William Whitehead | Words to Live By | |
| 2014 | Bill Conall | The Promised Land | |
| 2014 | Arthur Black | Fifty Shades of Black | |
| 2014 | Jane Christmas | And Then There Were Nuns | |
| 2014 | Wayne Johnston | The Son of a Certain Woman | |
| 2014 | Steve Smith | Red Green's Beginner's Guide to Women | |
| 2015 | Terry Fallis | No Relation | |
| 2015 | Aaron Bushkowsky | Curtains for Roy | |
| 2015 | Alan Doyle | Where I Belong: Small Town to Great Big Sea | |
| 2015 | Zarqa Nawaz | Laughing All the Way to the Mosque | |
| 2015 | Robert Wringham | A Loose Egg | |
| 2016 | Susan Juby | Republic of Dirt | |
| 2016 | Terry Fallis | Poles Apart | |
| 2016 | Sarah Mian | When the Saints | |
| 2017 | Gary Barwin | Yiddish for Pirates | |
| 2017 | Amy Jones | We're All in This Together | |
| 2017 | Drew Hayden Taylor | Take Us to Your Chief and Other Stories | |
| 2018 | Jennifer Craig | Gone to Pot | |
| 2018 | Laurie Gelman | Class Mom | |
| 2018 | Scaachi Koul | One Day We'll All Be Dead and None of This Will Matter | |
| 2019 | Cathal Kelly | Boy Wonders | |
| 2019 | Ali Bryan | The Figgs | |
| 2019 | Mark Critch | Son of a Critch: A Childish Newfoundland Memoir | |

=== 2020s ===
Winners and shortlisted candidates of the Stephen Leacock Medal for Humour
| Year | Writer | Title | Ref. |
|---|---|---|---|
| 2020 | Heidi L. M. Jacobs | Molly of the Mall: Literary Lass and Purveyor of Fine Footwear | |
| 2020 | Amy Spurway | Crow | |
| 2020 | Drew Hayden Taylor | Cottagers and Indians | |
| 2021 | Thomas King | Indians on Vacation | |
| 2021 | Joseph Kertes | Last Impressions | |
| 2021 | Morgan Murray | Dirty Birds | |
| 2022 | Rick Mercer | Talking to Canadians | |
| 2022 | Mark Critch | An Embarrassment of Critches | |
| 2022 | Dawn Dumont | The Prairie Chicken Dance Tour | |
| 2023 | Wayne Johnston | Jennie's Boy | |
| 2023 | Susan Juby | Mindful of Everything | |
| 2023 | Zarqa Nawaz | Jameela Green Ruins Everything | |
| 2024 | Patrick deWitt | The Librarianist | |
| 2024 | Ali Bryan | Coq | |
| 2024 | Deborah Willis | Girlfriend on Mars | |
| 2025 | Natalie Sue | I Hope This Finds You Well | |
| 2025 | Greg Kearney | An Evening with Birdy O'Day | |
| 2025 | Patricia J. Parsons | We Came from Away | |
| 2026 | Meredith Hambrock | She's a Lamb! | |
| 2026 | Susin Nielsen | SNAP | |
| 2026 | Mark Waddell | Colin Gets Promoted and Dooms the World | |
