= Jennifer Craig (writer) =

Canadian writer (1934–2023)

Jennifer Lynn Craig (née Rice; 1934 – June 1, 2023) was a Canadian writer, most noted for her 2017 novel Gone to Pot. The book, about a British Columbia grandmother who resorts to growing marijuana in her basement during a time of financial desperation, won the 2018 Stephen Leacock Memorial Medal for Humour.

Her memoir Yes Sister, No Sister: My Life as a Trainee Nurse in 1950s Yorkshire was published by Ebury Press in 2010; Jabs, Jenner and Juggernauts: a Look at Vaccination was published by Impact Investigative Media Productions in 2009 and she self-published the novel Mary Lou's Brew in 2014.

While in Orillia for the Stephen Leacock Award ceremony, Craig suffered a stroke during an advance ceremony to honour the nominees. She was immediately rushed to hospital, and her daughter had to accept the Leacock Award on her behalf.

Craig died at home in Nelson, British Columbia, on June 1, 2023, at home, with her family by her side.
