= Joan Walker =

Canadian writer

- Born: Winifred Joan Suter; 21 November 1908; London, England
- Died: 27 July 1997
- Spouse(s): Ogilvie MacKenzie-Kerr (m. 1938), James Rankin Walker (m. 1946)
- Writing career
- Period: 1950s
- Notable works: Pardon My Parka, Repent at Leisure

Joan Walker, née Suter (21 November 1908 – 27 July 1997), was a Canadian writer. She won two noted Canadian literary awards in the 1950s, the Stephen Leacock Award in 1954 for Pardon My Parka and the Ryerson Fiction Award in 1957 for Repent at Leisure. Pardon My Parka was a humorous memoir of her own experiences adapting to Canadian culture after moving to Canada as a war bride, while Repent at Leisure was a novel about a woman trapped in a troubled marriage.

Born in London, England, she worked as a fashion artist for Harrods, an editor for Amalgamated Press and Newnes-Pearson and as a feature journalism writer for Sunday Pictorial before marrying James Rankin Walker, a Canadian military officer in the Algonquin Regiment, in 1946. She became a Canadian citizen in 1954. The couple initially lived in Val-d'Or, Quebec, although by the time of her Ryerson Award win they had moved to Swastika, Ontario; in her later years, Walker and her husband lived in Oak Bay, British Columbia.

She was a member of the Canadian Women's Press Club and the Canadian Authors Association. She contributed a humorous essay griping about unfair author contracts to an issue of Canadian Author & Bookman, the Canadian Authors Association's trade magazine, in 1960, creating a minor crisis for the organization as several publishing companies withdrew their advertising from the magazine in protest.

She published one further novel, Marriage of Harlequin (1962), a fictional account of the life of Richard Brinsley Sheridan. She was later a columnist and book reviewer for The Globe and Mail.
