= Hilda Kay Grant =

Canadian writer and artist (1910–1996)

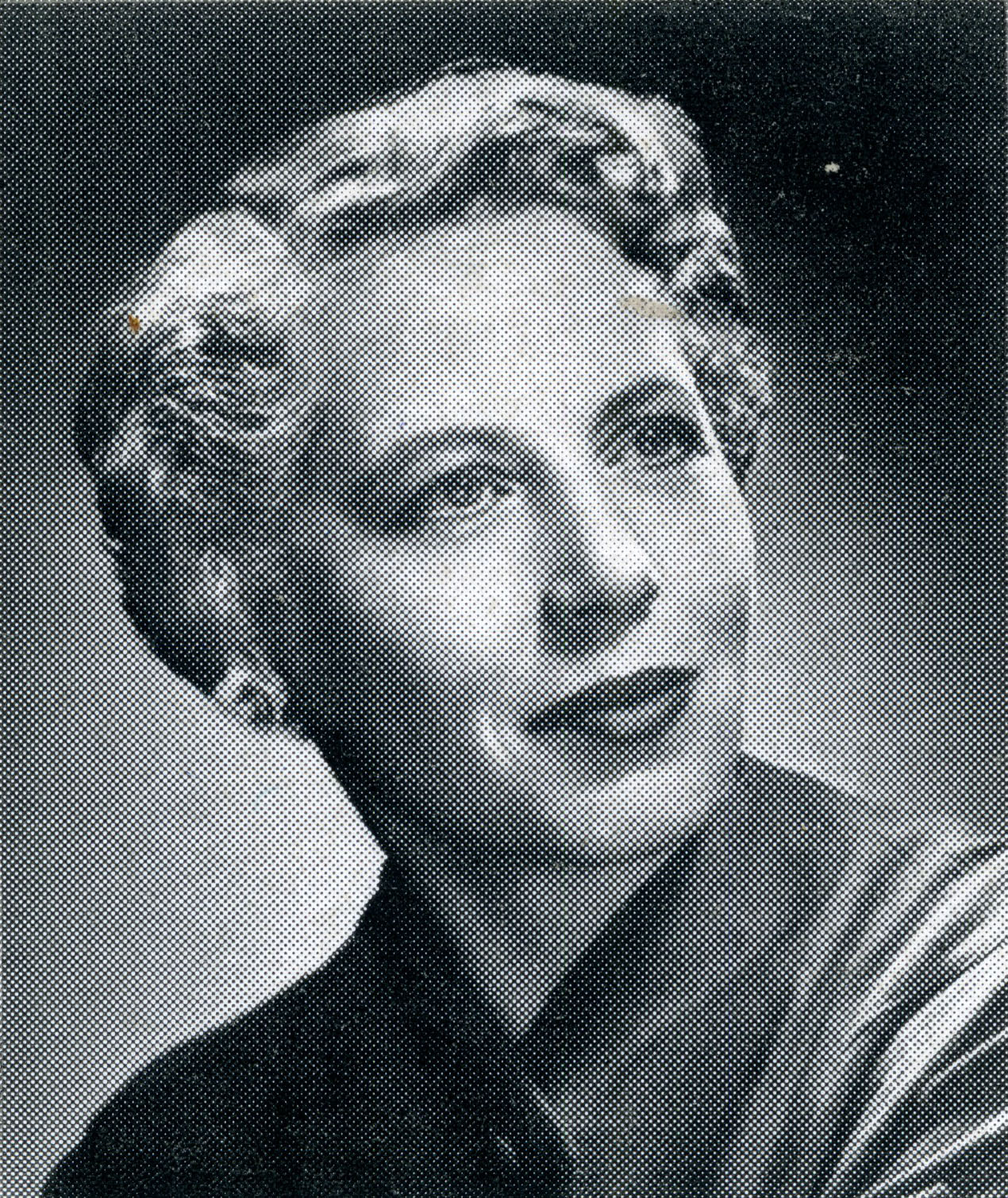
- Hilda Kay Grant in 1955
- Born: Hilda Kay; November 29, 1910; Yarmouth, Nova Scotia
- Died: May 11, 1996 (aged 85); Toronto, Ontario, Canada
- Occupations: writer and artist

Hilda Kay Grant (November 29, 1910 – May 11, 1996) was a Canadian writer and artist who published both non-fiction work under her own name and novels under the pen name Jan Hilliard.

== Biography ==
Born Hilda Kay in 1910 in Yarmouth, Nova Scotia, to English parents, Grant attended Yarmouth Academy and later studied at the Grand Central School of Art in New York. During the Second World War she worked as a secretary in Montreal and Toronto and in 1945 married fellow Nova Scotian Joseph Howe Grant, a professional engineer. Together they lived first in Toronto and later in the village of Kleinburg north of the city. She disliked the name Hilda and was known to all by her maiden name of Kay.

During her years in Toronto, Grant was an active member of the Heliconian Club, vice-president of the Toronto branch of the Canadian Authors' Association, and a mentor to many writers and painters. When the American publishing firm of Abelard-Schuman established its Canadian subsidiary, she became fiction editor and oversaw many Canadian writers into print. Her New York literary agent was well-known Paul R. Reynolds.

Grant published her first book, The Salt Box, in her 40s and continued writing for less than twenty years. Written under the pseudonym Jan Hilliard, semi-autobiographical The Salt Box won the prestigious Stephen Leacock Memorial Medal for Humour in 1952 and garnered strong reviews in numerous Canadian and American newspapers. Although originally set in the 1920s, her publisher demanded the novel be relocated to the late nineteenth century.

The Salt Box was followed by another comedy, A View of the Town, described by The Boston Globe as "a vastly entertaining story of a small town in Nova Scotia, designed to prove that still waters run deep. It does and they do". The Jameson Girls of 1956 is an amusing account of four daughters gathered to the bedside of their dying father, a hot-tempered and tyrannical Niagara River rum runner.

The next novel, Dove Cottage, inspired by the author's own house outside Toronto, was described by The New Yorker as "an unashamed and thoroughly delightful escape story about a domesticated, downtrodden Canadian bank clerk, Homer Flynn, who unexpectedly inherits a large fortune ... (and) takes advantage of his new-found wealth to do exactly as he pleases." Published in 1960 Miranda, according to The New York Times, "... is a loving book...It is also -- and here imagination ceases -- a letter-perfect rending of day-by-day living in a Nova Scotian town in the Nineteen Twenties. This the present reviewer can aver." Morgan's Castle of 1964 is a murder mystery set at a winery in the fictitious village of Greenwood in the Niagara Peninsula of Ontario and, as The New York Times wrote at the time, "Few such credible and practical murderers have flourished in fiction. Miss Hilliard uncomfortably persuades one they may be commoner in life." Dove Cottage was also published in the weekend supplement magazine Star Weekly Novels and translated to Dutch as De charmante bezoeker (De Spaarnestad, 1960). Morgan's Castle was similarly published in Star Weekly Novels, in Holland as Spel met de dood (De Spaarnestad, 1966), and republished by Ace Books in 1979. Grant also wrote short stories and poetry for such magazines as Maclean's, Chatelaine and Canadian Poetry.

Four To Go (1973) was Grant's last work of fiction, published in abridged version under her own name in the Toronto Star Weekly. She also authored three works of non-fiction. She received a Canadian Centennial Commission grant to research and write Samuel Cunard, Pioneer of the Atlantic Steamship and was also a Canada Council Award recipient. A lifelong gardener, even when limited to a balcony in her later years, Grant co-authored Small City Gardens with William S. Brett in 1967. Robert Stevenson, Engineer and Sea-builder was a biography of the lighthouse builder and grandfather of Robert Louis Stevenson. In 1969, Kay Grant left writing to focus on her first artistic interest of painting and in her later years was recognized as an accomplished watercolorist. She had often supplied illustrations for her own books.

Kay Grant died on May 11, 1996, at her home in Toronto and was cremated and interred in the Grant family plot in Riverside Cemetery in New Glasgow, Nova Scotia.

== Works ==
=== Novels ===
Kay Grant wrote seven novels, six under the pseudonym Jan Hilliard:

- The Salt Box (1951) W. W. Norton, New York City, returned to print in 2009
- A View of the Town (1954) Abelard-Schuman, New York City
- The Jameson Girls (1956) Nelson, Foster, & Scott, Toronto
- Dove Cottage (1958) Abelard-Schuman, London/New York City
- Miranda (1960) Abelard-Schuman, London/New York City/Toronto
- Morgan's Castle (1964) Abelard-Schuman, New York City. Republished by Ace Books (New York City, 1979) and Véhicule Press (Montreal, 2026)
- Four To Go (1973) Star Weekly, Toronto (Pt 1, 1973-03-24; Pt 2, 1973-03-31)

=== Non-fiction ===
- Samuel Cunard, Pioneer of the Atlantic Steamship (1967) Abelard-Schuman, London
- Small City Gardens (coauthored with William S. Brett) (1967) Abelard-Schuman, Toronto
- Robert Stevenson, Engineer and Sea-builder (1969) Meredith Press, New York
