= Stephanie Park =

Canadian wheelchair basketball player

Personal information
- Born: November 28, 1993 (age 32) Vancouver, British Columbia
- Listed height: 5 ft 1 in (1.55 m)
Medals
Athletics
Paralympic Games
Gold medal – first place	2010 Women's CWBL National Championships	Women's wheelchair basketball

Stephanie Park (born November 28, 1993) is a Canadian Paralympic wheelchair basketball player from Vancouver, British Columbia who won a gold medal in Women's CWBL National Championships.
