= Sondra Gotlieb =

Canadian journalist and novelist (1936–2026)

Sondra Gotlieb (née Kaufman; 30 December 1936 – 21 January 2026) was a Canadian journalist and novelist who lived in Toronto, Ontario.

== Early life and career ==
Sondra Kaufman was born in Winnipeg, Manitoba on 30 December 1936. She married Allan Gotlieb, Canadian ambassador to the United States during the presidency of Ronald Reagan. Her book Washington Rollercoaster recounted the Gotliebs' years as glamorous hosts in Washington during the Reagan Era, when she wrote a much-read column for the Washington Post. Vanity Fair magazine called her a "sparkling hostess", and in Washington she quickly became known for her irreverent attitude and sharp tongue. She often attracted attention with remarks considered out-of-character for diplomatic wives. Referring to Canada's image in America as a dull northern neighbour, she remarked: "Maybe we should invade South Dakota".

In 1986, she attracted a blaze of international publicity when reporter Juliet O'Neill caught her slapping her social secretary Connie Gibson Connors at an official dinner she and her husband were hosting in honour of the Canadian prime minister Brian Mulroney and U.S. Vice-President George H. W. Bush. The incident, while criticized, made her one of the most talked-about women in Washington, and invitations to the Gotliebs' parties became highly coveted.

After she and her husband returned to Canada in the early 1990s, they moved to Toronto's exclusive Rosedale neighbourhood and became the centre of establishment society in that city. Allan joined numerous corporate boards, including Conrad Black's Hollinger Inc., while Sondra began writing columns for The Globe and Mail and later the National Post, which was owned by Conrad Black.

She won the Stephen Leacock Prize for her 1978 novel, True Confections, which was subtitled, Or How My Family Arranged My Marriage.

In 2001, she alluded to the infamous "Slap Flap" incident in a series of articles about her recent facelift, published in the National Post. Gotlieb recounted how the idea for cosmetic surgery first came to her after a visit with friends in Washington D.C. "One of them said to me, 'It must be nice living in Toronto. You can slop around without having to bother too much about your appearance. Canadians have such old-fashioned values.' For the second time in my life I felt like slapping someone's face."

Her regular column in the National Post continued until 2015.

== Personal life and death ==
Gotlieb and her husband, Allan, were married in 1955. They had three children.

Gotlieb resided in the Toronto neighbourhood of Rosedale. She died after a brief illness on 21 January 2026, at the age of 89.

== Works ==
- The Gourmet's Canada – 1972
- True Confections – 1978
- First Lady, Last Lady – 1981
- Wife Of... – 1985
- Washington Rollercoaster – 1990
- Dogs, Houses, Gardens, Food & Other Addictions – 2002
- When I Rises Up, I Gets Confused: The Best of Sondra Gotlieb – 2004
