= John Levesque =

Canadian novelist and journalist (born 1953)

John Levesque (born 1953) is a Canadian novelist, journalist, and humour columnist whose recognitions include the 1993 Leacock Memorial Medal for Humour awarded for his book of essays Waiting for Aquarius, published in 1993.

In addition to another essay collection Stranded on the Information Highway (1995), he has authored three novels: Rosseter's Memory, Geneva Farewell, and Sometime Soon. The latter won the Hamilton Arts Council Award for fiction.

Levesque's career as a journalist began at the North Bay Nugget where he worked as a reporter, editor, and columnist from 1974 to 1980. At The Hamilton Spectator, he started as a staff writer and reporter but moved into the role of film critic and humour columnist before returning to North Bay to work in program development for Workplace Safety North, a not-for-profit association that provides services to the mining and forest products industries.

In 2024, he was appointed by the Leacock Associates, the organization that awards the Leacock Medal, to the honorary role of Mayor of Mariposa for the years 2025 and 2026.
