= Bibliography of Jean Chrétien =

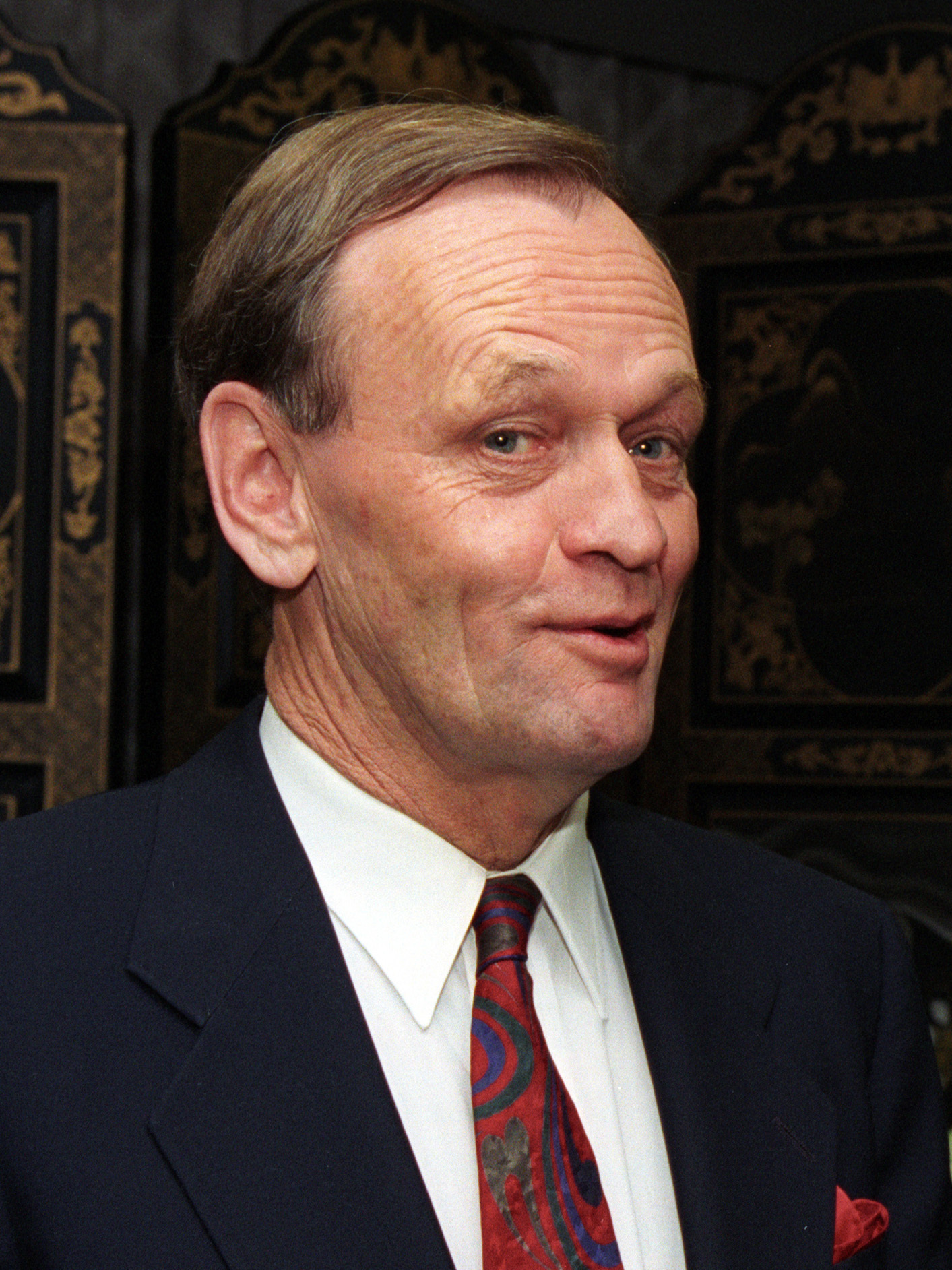
Chrétien in 1993

Jean Chrétien is a Canadian politician and lawyer who served as the 20th prime minister of Canada from 1993 to 2003. He has authored several memoirs detailing his life and political career.

Chrétien's first memoir, Straight from the Heart, was published in 1985 by Key Porter Books. It covers his early life, entry into politics, and roles as a Member of Parliament and cabinet minister under Prime Ministers Lester B. Pearson and Pierre Trudeau.

His second book, My Years as Prime Minister, was released in 2007 by Knopf Canada. It details his time as prime minister, including the 1995 Quebec referendum and other challenges. The book discusses his interactions with other political leaders such as American President Bill Clinton.

In 2018, Chrétien published My Stories, My Times in English and Mes Histoires in French, a collection of personal anecdotes from his political and personal life. A second volume was released in 2021.

Chrétien has been the subject of a variety of literary works. This bibliography also includes written and published works examining Chrétien's political career and policies, limited to non-fiction books specifically discussing Chrétien and his time as prime minister from notable authors and publishers. Tertiary sources, satire, and self-published literature are excluded.

== Books by Chrétien ==
List of written and published works by Jean Chrétien
Book title	Year	Publisher	Identifiers	Notes
Straight from the Heart	1985	Key Porter Books	ISBN 1-5501-3576-7; OCLC 29795418	
My Years as Prime Minister	2007	Knopf Canada	ISBN 978-0-6769-7900-8; OCLC 176054309	
My Stories, My Times	2018	Random House Canada	ISBN 978-0-7352-7734-2; OCLC 1044275257	
Mes Histoires	2018	LaPresse	ISBN 978-2-8970-5705-3; OCLC 1060596539	
My Stories, My Times v. 2	2021	Random House Canada	ISBN 978-1-0390-0097-1; OCLC 1248927090	

== Books about Chrétien ==
List of written and published works about Jean Chrétien
Author(s)	Book title	Year	Publisher	Identifiers	Notes
Lawrence Martin	Chrétien: The Will to Win	1995	Lester Publishing	ISBN 1-8955-5595-7; OCLC 416048143	
Edward Greenspon, Anthony Wilson-Smith	Double Vision: The Inside Story of the Liberals in Power	1996	Doubleday Canada	ISBN 0-3852-5613-2; OCLC 35937115	
Lawrence Martin	Iron Man: The Defiant Reign of Jean Chrétien	2003	Viking Canada	ISBN 0-6700-4310-9; OCLC 52877378	
Edward McWhinney	Chrétien and Canadian Federalism: Politics and the Constitution, 1993–2003	2003	Ronsdale Press	ISBN 1-5538-0006-0; OCLC 52196992	
Paul Tuns	Jean Chretien: A Legacy Of Scandal	2004	Freedom Press Canada	ISBN 0-9732-7572-3; OCLC 63093554	
Lois Harder, Steve Patten	The Chrétien Legacy: Politics and Public Policy in Canada	2006	McGill–Queen's University Press	ISBN 978-0-7735-3107-9; OCLC 64344734	
Bob Plamondon	The Shawinigan Fox: How Jean Chrétien Defied the Elites and Reshaped Canada	2017	Great River Media	ISBN 978-1-7750-9811-9; OCLC 1021230384	
Tom Flanagan	Pivot or Pirouette? The 1993 Canadian General Election	2022	University of British Columbia Press	ISBN 978-0-7748-6683-5; OCLC 1309962190	
Jack Cunningham, John Meehan	Chrétien and the World: Canadian Foreign Policy from 1993 to 2003	2025	UBC Press	ISBN 978-0-7748-7207-2; OCLC 1502739323	

== See also ==
- List of books about prime ministers of Canada
- Bibliography of Canada
