= List of books about prime ministers of Canada =

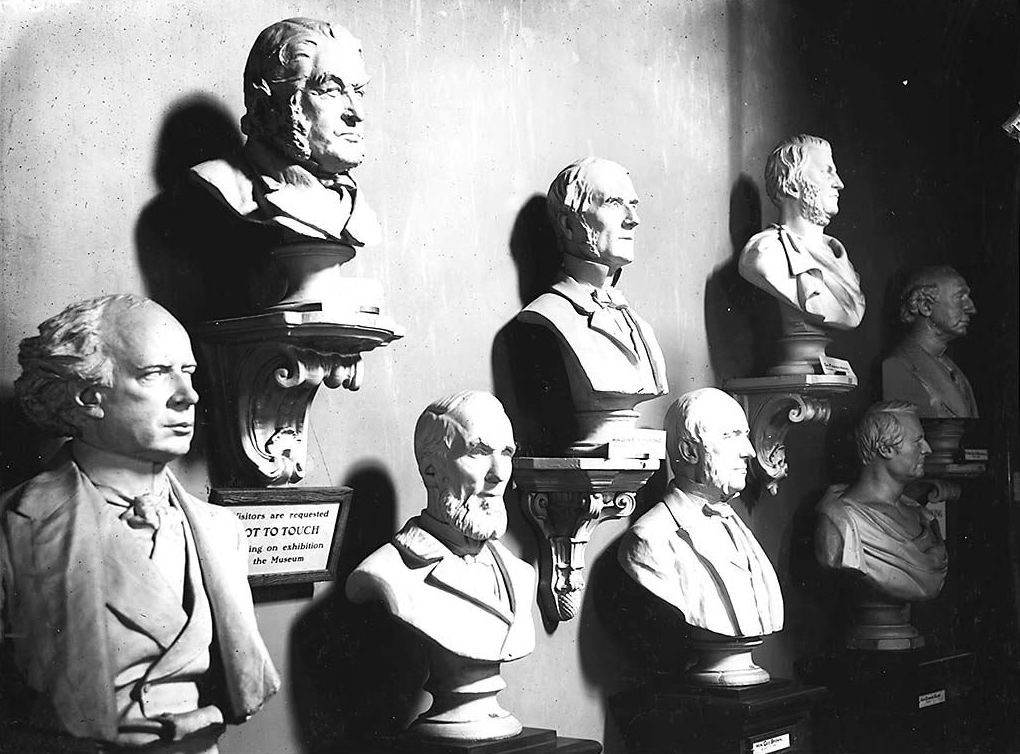
Busts of prime ministers of Canada and provincial premiers, displayed at the Provincial Museum (predecessor to the Royal Ontario Museum) at the Toronto Normal School. Photograph appeared in the Toronto World illustrated section, February 19, 1911

The prime minister of Canada is the head of government of Canada. This list compiles written and published books concerning Canadian prime ministers from notable authors and publishers. This listing is mainly compiled in 2011 from the Canadiana : the national bibliography with arbitrary additions since then.

== Overview ==
- Azzi, Stephen and Patrice Dutil. (eds.) (2025) Statecraft: Prime Ministers and their Cabinets. University of Toronto Press.
- Blake, Raymond B. (2024) Canada's Prime Ministers and the Shaping of National Identity. University of British Columbia Press.
- Bliss, Michael (1994). Right Honourable Men: The Descent of Canadian Politics from Macdonald to Mulroney. Toronto: HarperPerennial. ISBN 978-0-00-638062-7.
- Bliss, Michael (2004). Right Honourable Men: The Descent of Canadian Politics from Macdonald to Chrétien (Second ed.). Toronto: Harper Perennial. p. 365. ISBN 9780006394846.
- Bowering, George (1999). Egotists and Autocrats: The Prime Ministers of Canada. Toronto: Viking. ISBN 0-670-88081-7.
- Coucill, Irma (2005). Canada's Prime Ministers, Governors General and Fathers of Confederation. Pembroke Publishers. ISBN 1-55138-185-0.
- Donaldson, Gordon (1994). The Prime Ministers of Canada. Toronto: Doubleday Canada Limited. ISBN 0-385-25454-7.
- Dutil, Patrice (ed.) (2023) Statesmen, Strategists and Diplomats. Canada's Prime Ministers and the Making of Foreign Policy. University of British Columbia Press.
- Dutil, Patrice (2017). Prime Ministerial Power in Canada: Its Origins under Macdonald, Laurier and Borden. University of British Columbia Press. ISBN 978-0-7748-3473-5.
- Ferguson, Will (1999). Bastards & Boneheads: Canada's Glorious Leaders Past and Present. Vancouver: Douglas & McIntyre. ISBN 1-55054-737-2.
- Granatstein, J.L.; Hillmer, Norman (1999). Prime Ministers: Ranking Canada's Leaders. Toronto: HarperCollins Publishers. ISBN 0-00-200027-X.
- Hutchison, Bruce (1964). Mr. Prime Minister, 1867-1964. Don Mills, Ontario: Longmans Canada.
- Lewis, Robert. (2018) Power, Prime Ministers and the Press. Toronto: Dundurn Press.
- Lotz, Jim (1986), Prime Ministers of Canada, Bison Books, ISBN 0-86124-377-3
- Schlee, Gary. (2018) Unknown and Unforgettable: A Guide to Canada's Prime Ministers. Toronto: Shorelawn Publishing.
- Stewart, J.D.M. (2018) Being Prime Minister. Toronto: Dundurn Press.
- Stewart, J.D.M. (2025) The Prime Ministers. Sutherland House

== John A. Macdonald ==
- Boyer, M. Raoul. (2022) John A. Macdonald: Canada's First Prime Minister. Yesterday Today Publishing. ISBN 978-0991855841*Dutil, Patrice. (2025) Ballots and Brawls: The 1867 Canadian General Election. UBC Press.
- Collins, Joseph Edmund. (1883) Life and times of the Right Honourable Sir John A. Macdonald: Premier of the Dominion of Canada
- Creighton, Donald (1998) John A. Macdonald: The Young Politician. The Old Chieftain University of Toronto Press ISBN 0-8020-7164-3
- Dutil, Patrice. (2024) Sir John A. Macdonald: The Apocalyptic Year of 1885. Sutherland House.
- Dutil, Patrice, and Roger Hall (2014) John A. Macdonald at 200: New Reflections and Legacies. Dundurn Press ISBN 978-1-4597-2459-4
- Laxer, James (2016) Staking Claims to a Continent: John A. Macdonald, Abraham Lincoln, Jefferson Davis, and the Making of North America. Anansi Press ISBN 978-1-77089-430-3
- Guillet, Edwin C, (1967) You'll Never Die, John A!. Toronto: Macmillan of Canada.
- Gwyn, Richard (2008) John A: The Man Who Made Us Vol 1. Vintage Canada. ISBN 0-679-31476-8
- Gwyn, Richard (2011) Nation Maker Sir John A. MacDonald: His Life, Our Times Vol. 2. Random House. ISBN 0-307-35644-2
- Johnson, J.K. and Waite, P.B. (2007) "Sir John Alexander Macdonald," in Canada's Prime Ministers, Macdonald to Trudeau: Portraits from the Dictionary of Canadian Biography. Toronto: University of Toronto Press. ISBN 0-8020-9173-3
- Johnson, J.K. (1969) Affectionately Yours: The Letters of Sir John A. Macdonald and His Family. Toronto: Macmillan of Canada. ISBN 0-7705-1017-5
- Martin, Ged. (2013) John A. Macdonald: Canada's First Prime Minister. Dundurn Press ISBN 978-1-4597-0651-4
- McSherry, James. (1984) The invisible lady: Sir John A. Macdonald's first wife. In Canadian Bulletin of Medical History, Vol. 1 pp. 91–97.
- Parkin, George R. (2007) Sir John A. MacDonald: The Makers of Canada (1908) Kessinger Publishing ISBN 0-548-78347-0
- Phenix, Patricia (2007) Private Demons: The Tragic Personal Life of John A. Macdonald McClelland & Stewart ISBN 0-7710-7045-4
- Pope, Joseph (1921) Correspondence of Sir John Macdonald: selections from the correspondence of Sir John Alexander Macdonald. Toronto: Oxford University Press.
- Pope, Joseph. (1915) The Day of Sir John Macdonald: A Chronicle of the First Prime Minister of the Dominion. Toronto: Brook & Co.
- Pope, Joseph. (1894) Memoirs of the Right Honourable Sir John Alexander Macdonald, G.C.B., First Prime Minister of The Dominion of Canada, Vols. 1&2. Ottawa: J. Durie & Son.
- Rohmer, Richard (2013) Sir John A.'s Crusade and Seward's Magnificent Folly Dundurn Press ISBN 978-1-4597-0985-0
- Sletcher, Michael. (2004) "Sir John A. Macdonald," in James Eli Adams, and Tom and Sara Pendergast, eds., Encyclopedia of the Victorian Era. 4 vols., Danbury, CT: Grolier Academic Reference. ISBN 0-7172-5860-2
- Swainson, Donald. (1989) Sir John A. Macdonald: The Man and the Politician. Kingston, ON: Quarry Press. ISBN 0-919627-29-3* Waite, Peter B. (2000) John a MacDonald: Revised Fitzhenry & Whiteside ISBN 1-55041-479-8
- Smith, Cynthia M., and Jack McLeod (1989)Sir John A. : an anecdotal life of John A. Macdonald Oxford University Press ISBN 0-19-540681-8
- Waite, P. B. (1976) + (1999) John A. Macdonald. Don Mills, ON: Fitzhenry and Whiteside Limited.
- Waite, P. B. (1975) Macdonald: His Life and World. Toronto: McGraw-Hill Ryerson Limited. ISBN 0-07-082301-4.
- Wallace, W. Stewart. (1924) Sir John Macdonald. Toronto: The Macmillan Company of Canada Limited.

== Alexander Mackenzie ==
- Buckingham, William; Ross, George William (2005). The Hon. Alexander Mackenzie: His Life and Times. Honolulu: University Press of the Pacific. ISBN 1-4102-2381-7. (2005 reprint)
- Buckingham, William; Ross, George William (1892). The Honourable Alexander Mackenzie: His Life and Times. Toronto: Rose Publishing Company Limited.
- Dent, John Charles (1880). The Canadian Portrait Gallery. Vol. 1. Toronto: John B. Magurn.
- Marquis, T. G. (1903). Builders of Canada from Cartier to Laurier. Toronto: John C. Winston and Co.
- Ross, George W. (1913). Getting into Parliament and After. Toronto: William Briggs.
- Thomson, Dale C. (1960). Alexander Mackenzie, Clear Grit. Toronto: Macmillan of Canada.

== John Abbott ==
- Elisabeth L. Abbott, 1997, The Reluctant P.M.: Notes on the Life of Sir John Abbott, Canada's Third Prime Minister, Sainte Anne de Bellevue, Québec, Abbott ISBN 0-921370-09-1
- Michael Hill, 2022. The Lost Prime Ministers. Toronto: Dundurn Press. Covers Abbott, Thompson, Bowell and Tupper.
- Pieter L. van Ewijk, 2020, "POWER BROKER; Canada's 3rd Prime Minister, John J.C. Abbott", Coaldale, Alberta: PvE Publishing ISBN 978-1-77-530971-0

== John Thompson ==
- J. Castell Hopkins, 1895, Life and Work of the Rt. Hon. Sir John Thompson, Toronto: United Publishing Houses.
- J.P. Heisler, 1955, Sir John Thompson, thesis, University of Toronto.
- John Saywell (editor), 1960, The Canadian Journal of Lady Aberdeen, 1893–1898, Champlain Society.
- Bruce Hutchison, 1964, Mr. Prime Minister 1867–1964, Toronto: Longmans Canada.
- Lovell Clark, 1968, A History of the Conservative Administrations, 1891–1896, PhD thesis, University of Toronto.
- Peter Busby Waite, 1985, The Man from Halifax: Sir John Thompson, Prime Minister, Toronto: University of Toronto Press, ISBN 0-8020-5659-8.

== Mackenzie Bowell ==
- Betsy Boyce, 2001, The accidental Prime Minister: The biography of Sir Mackenzie Bowell, Ameliasburg, ON: Seventh Town Historical Society ISBN 0-9691935-5-6
- Ted Glenn, 2022. A Very Canadian Coup. Toronto: Dundurn Press.
- Barry K. Wilson, 2021. Sir Mackenzie Bowell: A Prime Minister Forgotten by History. Loose Cannon Press.

== Charles Tupper ==
- Joseph Howe, Hon. Mr. Howe's Speech on Dr. Tupper's Railway Resolution. House of assembly. Monday, 9 April 1860. (1860)
- Joseph Howe, Speech of the Honorable Provincial Secretary, In reply to Doctor Tupper, On the Subject of Retrenchment. Wednesday, March 25 (1863)
- Charles Tupper, A Letter to the Right Honourable the Earl of Carnarvon: In Reply to a Pamphlet Entitled "Confederation Considered in Relation to the Interests of the Empire" (1866)
- Charles Tupper, Letter from the Hon. Dr. Tupper, C.B., to the Hon. James McDonald, M.P.P. (1872)
- The Pacific Railway: Speeches Delivered by Hon. Sir Charles Tupper, K.C.M.G., Minister of Railways and Canals, Hon. H.L. Langevin, C.B., Minister of Public Works, J.B. Plumbs, Esq., M.P., (Niagara), Thomas White, Esq., M.P., (Cardwell), During the Debate in the House of Commons, Session 1880 (1880)
- Charles Tupper, Le chemin de fer canadien du Pacifique: discours. Exposé complet de la question. (1880)
- Charles Tupper, Official Report of the Speech Delivered by Hon. Sir Charles Tupper, K.C.M.G., C.B., Minister of Raillways [sic] and Canals, On the Canadian Pacific Railway (1882)
- Charles Thibault, Biography of Sir Charles Tupper, Minister of Railway ... High Commissioner of Canada to England (1883)
- Charles Tupper, Unrestricted Reciprocity; Speech ... Delivered in the House of Commons, on Monday, March 19, 1888 (1888)
- Charles Tupper, Preferential Trade Relations Between Great Britain and Her Colonies: An Address Delivered before the Montreal Board of Trade, January 20, 1896 (1896)
- Charles Tupper, Speech on the Remedial Bill, Ottawa, 18 March 1896. (1896)
- Henry J. Morgan, Ad Multos Annos: A Tribute to Sir Charles Tupper on His Political Birthday, 1900 (1900)
- E. M. Saunders, Three Premiers of Nova Scotia: The Hon. J. W. Johnstone, The Hon. Joseph Howe, The Hon. Charles Tupper (1909)
- Charles Tupper, Political Reminiscences of the Right Honourable Sir Charles Tupper, Bart., ed. W. A. Harkin (1914)
- The Life and Letters of the Rt. Hon. Sir Charles Tupper, Bart., K.C.M.G., ed. E. M. Saunders, 2 vols. (1916)
- J. W. Longley, Sir Charles Tupper (1916)
- Supplement to the Life and Letters of the Rt. Hon. Sir Charles Tupper, Bart., G.C.M.G., ed. C. H. Tupper (1926)
- W. M. Whitelaw, The Maritimes and Canada Before Confederation (1934)
- H. G. Skilling, Canadian Representation Abroad: From Agency to Embassy (1945)
- A. W. MacIntosh, "The Career of Sir Charles Tupper in Canada, 1864–1900", Ph.D. thesis, University of Toronto (1960)
- G. R. Stevens, Canadian National Railways, 2 vols. (1960–62)
- D. H. Tait, "The Role of Charles Tupper in Nova Scotian Politics, 1855–1870", M.A. thesis, Dalhousie University (1962)
- J. M. Robinson, "A Canadian at the Court of Queen Victoria: The High Commissionership, 1880–1895", M.A. thesis, University of Calgary (1967)
- L. C. Clark, "A History of the Conservative Administrations, 1891 to 1896", Ph.D. thesis, University of Toronto (1968)
- Ian Wilson, "Fleming and Tupper: The Fall of the Siamese Twins, 1880", in Character and Circumstance: Essays in Honour of Donald Grant Creighton, ed. J. S. Moir (1970)
- P. B. Waite, The Life and Times of Confederation, 1864–1867: Politics, Newspapers, and the Union of British North America (1971)
- P. B. Waite, Canada, 1874–1896: Arduous Destiny (1971)
- D. A. Muise, "Elections and Constituencies: Federal Politics in Nova Scotia, 1867–1878", Ph.D. thesis, University of Western Ontario (1971)
- K. M. McLaughlin, "Race, Religion and Politics: The Election of 1896 in Canada", Ph.D. thesis, University of Toronto (1974)
- Robert Page, "Tupper's Last Hurrah: The Years as Opposition Leader, 1896–1900" in The West and the Nation: Essays in Honour of W. L. Morton, ed. Carl Berger and Ramsay Cook (1976)
- H. C. Cameron, "Nova Scotians in the Federal Cabinet, 1867–1878", M.A. thesis, Queen's University (1976)
- W. K. Lamb, History of the Canadian Pacific Railway (1977)
- K. G. Pryke, Nova Scotia and Confederation, 1864–74 (1979)
- R. P. Langhout, "Developing Nova Scotia: Railways and Public Accounts, 1849–1867," Acadiensis 14.2 (1984–85)
- Vincent Durant, War Horse of Cumberland: The Life and Times of Sir Charles Tupper (1985)
- Ben Forster, A Conjunction of Interests: Business, Politics, and Tariffs, 1825–1879 (1986)
- R. P. Langhout, "Public Enterprise: An Analysis of Public Finance in the Maritime Colonies During the Period of Responsible Government", Ph.D. thesis, University of New Brunswick (1989)
- Ben Forster, "The 1870s: Political Integration" in The Atlantic Provinces in Confederation, ed. E. R. Forbes and D. A. Muise (1993)
- I. P. A. Buckner, "The 1860s: An End and a Beginning" in The Atlantic Region to Confederation, ed. P. A. Buckner and John Reid (1994)
- Jock Murray and Janet Murray, Sir Charles Tupper: Fighting Doctor to Father of Confederation (1998)
- Johanna Bertin, Sir Charles Tupper: The Bully for Any Great Cause (2006)

== Wilfrid Laurier ==
- Patrice Dutil and David MacKenzie. Canada 1911: The Decisive Election that Shaped the Country (2011) ISBN 978-1-55488-947-1
- Grace Stewart, Heather. Sir Wilfrid Laurier: the weakling who stood his ground (2006) ISBN 0-9736406-3-4
- Laurier LaPierre Sir Wilfrid Laurier and the Romance of Canada – (1996). ISBN 0-7737-2979-8
- Patrice Dutil. Devil's Advocate: Godfroy Langlois and the Politics of Liberal Progressivism in Laurier's Quebec (1994) ISBN 1-895854-31-8
- Real Bélanger. Wilfrid Laurier; quand la politique devient passion (Québec et Montréal, 1986, rev.ed. 2007)
- R. T. Clippingdale, Laurier, his life and world (Toronto, 1979)
- H. B. Neatby. Laurier and a Liberal Quebec; a study in political management, ed. R. T. Clippingdale (Toronto, 1973)
- Joseph Schull. Laurier. The First Canadian (1965)
- Oscar Douglas Skelton, Life and Letters of Sir Wilfrid Laurier 2v (1921; reprinted 1965)
- H. Blair Neatby. Laurier and a Liberal Quebec: A Study in Political Management (1973)
- J. W. Dafoe, Laurier: A Study in Canadian Politics (1922)
- Andre Pratte, Extraordinary Canadians: Wilfrid Laurier. Toronto: Penguin Canada, 2011.

== Robert Borden ==
- Patrice Dutil and David MacKenzie Canada 1911: The Decisive Election that Shaped the Country (2011) ISBN 978-1-55488-947-1
- Patrice Dutil and David MacKenzie Embattled Nation: Canada's Wartime Election of 1917 (2017) ISBN 978-1-4597-3726-6
- John English. Borden: his life and world (Toronto, 1977)
- English, John. The decline of politics: the Conservatives and the party system, 1901–20 (Toronto, 1977)
- Brown, Robert Craig. Robert Laird Borden: A Biography (1975)
- Macquarrie, Heath. Robert Borden and the Election of 1911. Canadian Journal of Economics and Political Science, 1959, Vol. 25 Issue 3, pp 271–286 in JSTOR
- Cook, Tim. Warlords: Borden, Mackenzie King, and Canada's World Wars. Toronto: Allen Lane, 2012.

== Arthur Meighen ==
- Graham, Roger (1960–1965). Arthur Meighen: a biography, 3 volumes. Clarke, Irwin.
- Meighen, Arthur. Unrevised and Unrepented II: Debating Speeches and Others by the Right Honourable Arthur Meighen (McGill-Queen's University Press, 2011), Edited by Arthur Milnes; this is an expanded version of Arthur Meighen, Unrevised and Unrepented: Debating Speeches and Others by the Right Honourable Arthur Meighen (1949)
- Oversea Addresses, June – July 1921 by Arthur Meighen at archive.org

== William Lyon Mackenzie King ==
Biographical

- Cook, Tim. Warlords: Borden, Mackenzie King, and Canada's World Wars. Toronto: Allen Lane, 2012.
- Dawson, R.M. (1958). William Lyon Mackenzie King: A Political Biography. Vol. 1. Archived from the original on 2009-07-06 – via Questia.
- Dutil, Patrice (ed.) The Enduring Riddle of Mackenzie King (2025) UBC Press.
- English, John, and J.O. Stubbs, eds. Mackenzie King: Widening the Debate, (1977), 257pp; 11 essays by scholars.
- Esberey, Joy E. Knight of the Holy Spirit: A Study of William Lyon Mackenzie King. (1980). 245 pp. a psychobiography stressing his spirituality.
- Ferns, Henry, Bernard Ostry, and John Meisel. The Age of Mackenzie King (1976), 396pp; scholarly biography to 1919; excerpt and text search.
- Granatstein, J.L. "King, (William Lyon) Mackenzie (1874–1950)", Oxford Dictionary of National Biography, online ed, Jan 2011 accessed 12 Sept 2011
- Granatstein, J.L. Mackenzie King: His Life and World, (1977).
- Hutchison, Bruce. The Incredible Canadian. 1952, a controversial popular book.
- Levine, Allan. King: William Lyon Mackenzie King: A Life Guided By the Hand of Destiny (2011), 515pp; .
- McGregor, F.A. The Fall & Rise of Mackenzie King, 1911–1919 (1962) online edition.
- Neatby, H. Blair (2016). "King, William Lyon Mackenzie". In Cook, Ramsay; Bélanger, Réal (eds.). Dictionary of Canadian Biography. Vol. XVII (1941–1950) (online ed.). University of Toronto Press.
- Neatby, H. Blair. William Lyon Mackenzie King, 1924–1932: The Lonely Heights (1963) standard biography, online edition.
- Neatby, H. Blair (1976). William Lyon Mackenzie King: 1932–1939: the Prism of Unity. Archived from the original on 2014-07-21 – via Questia.
- Stacey, C.P. A Very Double Life: The Private World of Mackenzie King (1985) excerpt and text search.
- Thompson, Neville. The Third Man: Churchill, Roosevelt, Mackenzie King and the Friendships that won WWII. Toronto: Sutherland House, 2021.
- Wagner, Anton. The Spiritualist Prime Minister: Mackenzie King and the New Revelation. Guildford, Surrey: White Crow Books, 2024. ISBN 978-1-78677-264-0
- Wagner, Anton. The Spiritualist Prime Minister: Mackenzie King and His Mediums. Guildford, Surrey: White Crow Books, 2024. ISBN 978-1-78677-266-4

Scholarly studies

- Allen, Ralph (1961). Ordeal by Fire: Canada, 1910–1945. Archived from the original on 2012-10-19 – via Questia.
- Betcherman, Lita-Rose. Ernest Lapointe: Mackenzie King's Great Quebec Lieutenant. (2002). 435 pp.
- Cuff, R.D. and Granatstein, J.L. Canadian-American Relations in Wartime: From the Great War to the Cold War. (1975). 205 pp.
- Donaghy, Greg, ed. Canada and the Early Cold War, 1943–1957 (1998) online edition.
- Dummitt, Christopher. Unbuttoned: A History of Mackenzie King's Secret Life. McGill-Queen's University Press, 2017.
- Dziuban, Stanley W. (1959). Military Relations between the United States and Canada, 1939–1945. Archived from the original on 2012-11-02 – via Questia.
- Eayrs James. In Defence of Canada. 5 vols. 1964–1983. the standard history of defense policy.
- Esberey, J.B. "Personality and Politics: A New Look at the King-Byng Dispute," Canadian Journal of Political Science vol 6 no. 1 (March 1973), 37–55.
- Granatstein, J. L. Canada's War: The politics of the Mackenzie King government, 1939–1945 (1975)
- Granatstein, J.L. Conscription in the Second World War, 1939–1945;: A study in political management (1969).
- Macfarlane, John. "Double Vision: Ernest Lapointe, Mackenzie King and the Quebec Voice in Canadian Foreign Policy, 1935–1939," Journal of Canadian Studies 1999 34(1): 93–111; argues Lapointe guided the more imperialist Mackenzie King through three explosive situations: the Ethiopian crisis of 1935, the Munich crisis of 1938, and the formulation of Ottawa's 'no-neutrality-no-conscription' pact in 1939.
- Mackenzie, David. King and Chaos. (1935 election) University of British Columbia Press, 2023.
- MacLaren, Roy. Mackenzie King in the age of the Dictators. McGill-Queen's University Press, 2019.
- Messamore, Barbara. Times of Transformation: The 1921 Canadian General Election. UBC Press, 2025.
- Neatby, H. Blair (1972). The Politics of Chaos: Canada in the Thirties. Archived from the original on 2012-10-12 – via Questia.
- Stacey, C. P. Arms, Men and Governments: The War Policies of Canada, 1939–1945 (1970).
- Stacey, C. P. Canada and the Age of Conflict: Volume 2: 1921–1948; the Mackenzie King Era, University of Toronto Press 1981, ISBN 0-8020-2397-5.
- Teigrob, Robert. Five Days in Hitler's Germany: Mackenzie King's Mission to Avert a Second World War, Toronto: University of Toronto Press, 2019.
- Thompson, John H., and Allan Seager. Canada 1922–1939. (1985). standard scholarly survey. (Part of The Canadian Centenary Series.)
- Whitaker, Reginald. The Government Party: Organizing and Financing the Liberal Party of Canada, 1930–1958 (1977).

Primary sources

- The Canadian Annual Review of Public Affairs (annual, 1901–1938), full text for 1920 online and downloadable.
- Mackenzie King, W. L. Industry and Humanity: A Study in the Principles Under-Lying Industrial Reconstruction (1918) online edition; also full text online and downloadable.
- The diaries of William Lyon Mackenzie King, 50,000 pages, typescript; fully searchable.
- Pickersgill, J.W., and Donald F. Forster, The Mackenzie King Record. 4 vols. Vol. 1: 1939–1944 and Vol. 2: 1944–1945 (University of Toronto Press, 1960); and Vol. 3: 1945–1946 online and Vol. 4: 1946–1947 online (University of Toronto Press, 1970). Edited from King's private diary.
- Hou, Charles, and Cynthia Hou, eds. Great Canadian Political Cartoons, 1915 to 1945. (2002). 244pp.
- Canadian Department of External Affairs, Documents on Canadian External Relations (Ottawa: Queen's Printer, 1967–). These cover the period 1909–1960. (Often referred to as DCER.)

Television series

- Brittain, Donald. The King Chronicles, National Film Board, 1988.

== R.B. Bennett ==
Monographs

- Andrew D. Maclean; R. B. Bennett, Prime Minister of Canada, Toronto, Excelsior Publishing Co., 1935.
- Ernest Watkins; R. B. Bennett: A Biography, 1963.
- J. R. H. Wilbur; The Bennett New Deal: Fraud or Portent, 1968.
- Gray, James Henry (1991). R.B. Bennett: the Calgary years. Toronto & Buffalo: University of Toronto Press. ISBN 9780802059758.
- Peter Busby Waite; Loner: Three Sketches of the Personal Life and Ideas of R.B. Bennett, 1870–1947, 1992.
- Christopher McCreery and Arthur Milnes (editors): The Authentic Voice of Canada, Kingston, Ontario, McGill – Queen's University Press, Centre for the Study of Democracy, 2009, ISBN 978-1-55339-275-0. This book is a collection of Bennett's speeches in the British House of Lords from 1941–47.
- Peter Busby Waite; In Search of R.B. Bennett, McGill-Queen's University Press, 2012.
- John Boyko; Bennett: The Rebel Who Challenged And Changed A Nation, Toronto, Key Porter Books, 2010, ISBN 1-55470-248-8.

Other works

- Bruce Hutchison; The Incredible Canadian, Toronto 1952, Longmans Canada. This book is mainly concerned with William Lyon Mackenzie King, but also includes substantial material on R. B. Bennett.
- Lord Beaverbrook; Friends, 1959.
- H. Blair Neatby; The Politics of Chaos: Canada in the Thirties, 1972 ch 4 on Bennett, pp 51–72 online version.
- C. P. Stacey; Canada and the Age of Conflict, volume 2, 1981.

== Louis St. Laurent ==
- Patrice Dutil (ed.); The Unexpected Louis St-Laurent: Politics and Policies for a Modern Canada, University of British Columbia Press, 2020 ISBN 9780774864022.
- J. W. Pickersgill, My years with Louis St-Laurent: a political memoir (Toronto and Buffalo, N.Y., 1975)
- D. C. Thomson, Louis St. Laurent: Canadian (Toronto, 1967)

== John Diefenbaker ==
Bibliography

- Archbold, Rick (2002), I Stand For Canada; The Story of the Maple Leaf Flag, Macfarlane Walter and Ross, ISBN 1-55199-108-X
- Bliss, Michael (2004), Right Honourable Men: The Descent of Canadian Politics from Macdonald to Chrétien (revised ed.), HarperCollins Publishers Ltd., ISBN 0-00-639484-1
- Courtney, John C. (2022) Revival and Change: The 1957 and 1958 Diefenbaker Elections. University of British Columbia Press.
- Diefenbaker, John (1975), One Canada, Memoirs of the Right Honourable John G. Diefenbaker: The Crusading Years 1895 to 1956, Macmillan of Canada, ISBN 0-7705-1331-X
- Diefenbaker, John (1976), One Canada, Memoirs of the Right Honourable John G. Diefenbaker: The Years of Achievement 1956 to 1962, Macmillan of Canada, ISBN 0-7705-1443-X
- Diefenbaker, John (1977), One Canada, Memoirs of the Right Honourable John G. Diefenbaker: The Tumultuous Years 1962 to 1967, Macmillan of Canada, ISBN 0-7705-1569-X
- Gabriel, Soloman (1987), Foreign Policy of Canada: A Study in Diefenbaker's Years, Uppal Publishing House, ISBN 81-85024-24-3
- Ibbitson, John. (2023) The Duel. Signal Publishing.
- Meisel, John (1962), The Canadian General Election of 1957, University of Toronto Press
- Nash, Knowlton (1990), Kennedy & Diefenbaker: Fear and Loathing Across the Undefended Border, McClelland and Stewart, ISBN 0-7710-6705-4
- Newman, Peter (1963), Renegade in Power: The Diefenbaker Years, McClelland and Stewart, ISBN 0-7710-6747-X
- Peden, Murray (1987), Fall of an Arrow, Stoddart Publishing, ISBN 0-7737-5105-X
- Plamondon, Bob. (2025) Freedom Fighter: John Diefenbaker's Battle for Canadian Liberties and Independence. Toronto: Aristotle Foundation.
- Smith, Denis (1995), Rogue Tory: The Life and Legend of John Diefenbaker, Macfarlane Walter & Ross, ISBN 0-921912-92-7
- Smith, Denis (2016). "Diefenbaker, John George". In Cook, Ramsay; Bélanger, Réal (eds.). Dictionary of Canadian Biography. Vol. XX (1971–1980) (online ed.). University of Toronto Press.
- Spencer, Dick. (1994) Trumpets and Drums: John Diefenbaker on the Campaign Trail. Greystone Books.
- Stewart, Greig (1991), Shutting Down the National Dream: A.V. Roe and the Tragedy of the Avro Arrow., McGraw-Hill-Ryerson, ISBN 0-07-551119-3
- Stursberg, Peter (1975), Diefenbaker: Leadership Gained 1956–62, University of Toronto Press, ISBN 0-8020-2130-1
- Stursberg, Peter (1976), Diefenbaker: Leadership Lost 1962–67, University of Toronto Press, ISBN 0-8020-2225-1
- Van Dusen, Thomas (1968), The Chief, McGraw-Hill, ISBN 0-665-25329-X

== Lester B. Pearson ==
- Anderson, Antony. The Diplomat: Lester Pearson and the Suez Crisis. Toronto: Goose Lane, 2015.
- Beal, John Robinson (1964). Pearson of Canada. New York City: Duell, Sloan and Pearce. OCLC 480173.
- Beal, John Robinson; Poliquin, Jean-Marc (1968). Les trois vies de Pearson of Canada (in French). Montreal: Éditions de l'Homme. OCLC 299901158.
- Bliss, Michael (1994). Right Honourable Men: the descent of Canadian politics from Macdonald to Mulroney (1st ed.). Toronto: HarperCollins. ISBN 978-0-00-255071-0. OCLC 30073069.
- Bothwell, Robert (1978). Pearson, His Life and World. Toronto, New York City: McGraw-Hill Ryerson. ISBN 978-0-07-082305-1. OCLC 4464045.
- Cohen, Andrew. Extraordinary Canadians: Lester B. Pearson. Toronto; Penguin Canada, 2008.
- Donaldson, Gordon (1994). The Prime Ministers of Canada. Toronto: Doubleday Canada. ISBN 978-0-385-25454-0. OCLC 29309906.
- Robbins, John E, ed. (1972). "Pearson, Lester Bowles". Encyclopedia Canadiana. Vol. 8. Ottawa: Grolier of Canada. p. 135. ISBN 978-0-7172-1601-7. OCLC 514259.
- English, John (1989–1992). The life of Lester Pearson. Toronto/New York City: Lester & Orpen Dennys/Alfred A. Knopf Canada. ISBN 978-0-88619-169-6. OCLC 22862125.
  - John English (2011). The Worldly Years: Life of Lester Pearson 1949–1972. Random House Digital, Inc. ISBN 978-0-307-37539-1.
- Ferguson, Will (1999). Bastards and Boneheads: Canada's Glorious Leaders, Past and Present. Vancouver: Douglas & McIntyre. ISBN 978-1-55054-737-5. OCLC 44883908.
- Pearson, Lester B; Fry, Michael G (1975). "Freedom and change" : essays in honour of Lester B. Pearson. Toronto: McClelland & Stewart. ISBN 978-0-7710-3187-8. OCLC 2692327. Also OCLC 463535217 and OCLC 300360332.
- Hutchison, Bruce (1964). Mr. Prime Minister 1867–1964. Don Mills, Ont: Longmans Canada. OCLC 5024890. Also OCLC 422290909.
- Stursberg, Peter (1978). Lester Pearson and the Dream of Unity. Toronto/New York City: Doubleday Canada/Doubleday. ISBN 978-0-385-13478-1. OCLC 4516158.
- Thordarson, Bruce (1974). Lester Pearson: diplomat and politician. Canadian lives. Toronto: Oxford University Press. ISBN 978-0-19-540225-4. OCLC 1584470.

Writings

- Pearson, Lester B (1953). Canada: Nation on the March. Toronto: Clarke, Irwin. OCLC 2982616.
- — (1970). The Crisis of Development. Russell C. Leffingwell lectures, 1969. New York City: Council on Foreign Relations by Praeger Publishers. OCLC 88948. Also published by Pall Mall Press (1970), ISBN 978-0-269-02736-9, OCLC 611559021.
- — (1959). Diplomacy in the Nuclear Age. Cambridge, Mass: Harvard University Press. OCLC 504766.
- — (1964). The Four Faces of Peace and the International Outlook. New York City: Dodd, Mead. OCLC 1311155.
- — (1972). Mike : The Memoirs of the Right Honourable Lester B. Pearson. New York City: Quadrangle Books. ISBN 978-0-8129-0299-0. OCLC 532497.
- — (1969). Peace in the Family of Man. Reith Lectures, 1968. London: British Broadcasting Corporation. ISBN 978-0-563-08449-5. OCLC 25607.
- — (1970). Words and Occasions: An Anthology of Speeches and Articles. Cambridge, Mass: Harvard University Press. ISBN 978-0-674-95611-7. OCLC 136293.

== Pierre Trudeau ==
- Aivalis, Christo. The Constant Liberal: Pierre Trudeau, Organized Labour and the Canadian Social Democratic Left. Vancouver: University of British Columbia Press, 2018.
- Bergeron, Gérard. Notre miroir à deux faces: Trudeau-Lévesque. Montreal: Québec/Amérique, c1985. ISBN 2-89037-239-1
- Bliss, Michael. Right Honourable Men: the descent of Canadian politics from Macdonald to Mulroney, 1994.
- Bothwell, Robert and Granatstein, J.L. Pirouette : Pierre Trudeau and Canadian foreign policy, 1990. ISBN 0-8020-5780-2
- Bowering, George. Egotists and Autocrats: the Prime Ministers of Canada, 1999.
- Burelle, André. Pierre Elliott Trudeau: l'intellectuel et le politique, Montréal: Fides, 2005, 480 pages. ISBN 2-7621-2669-X
- Butler, Rick, Jean-Guy Carrier, eds. The Trudeau decade. Toronto: Doubleday Canada, 1979.
- Butson, Thomas G. Pierre Elliott Trudeau. New York: Chelsea House, c1986. ISBN 0-87754-445-X
- Clarkson, Stephen; McCall, Christina. Trudeau and our times. Toronto: McClelland & Stewart, c1990–c1994. 2 v. ISBN 0-7710-5414-9 ISBN 0-7710-5417-3
- Cohen, Andrew, J. L. Granatstein, eds. Trudeau's Shadow: the life and legacy of Pierre Elliott Trudeau. Toronto: Vintage Canada, 1999.
- Couture, Claude. Paddling with the Current: Pierre Elliott Trudeau, Étienne Parent, liberalism and nationalism in Canada. Edmonton: University of Alberta Press, c1998. Issued also in French: La loyauté d'un laïc. ISBN 1-4175-9306-7 ISBN 0-88864-313-6
- Donaldson, Gordon (journalist). The Prime Ministers of Canada, 1997.
- English, John. Citizen of the World: The Life of Pierre Elliott Trudeau Volume One: 1919–1968 (2006); Just Watch Me: The Life of Pierre Elliott Trudeau Volume Two: 1968–2000 (2009); Knopf Canada, ISBN 0-676-97521-6 ISBN 978-0-676-97521-5
- Graham, Ron. (ed.) The Coutts Diaries: Power, Politics and Pierre Trudeau, 1973-1981. Toronto: Sutherland House, 2025. (forthcoming)
- Griffiths, Linda. Maggie & Pierre: a fantasy of love, politics and the media: a play. Vancouver: Talonbooks, 1980. ISBN 0-88922-182-0
- Gwyn, Richard. The Northern Magus: Pierre Trudeau and Canadians. Toronto: McClelland & Stewart, c1980. ISBN 0-7710-3732-5
- Laforest, Guy. Trudeau and the end of a Canadian dream. Montreal: McGill-Queen's University Press, c1995. ISBN 0-7735-1300-0 ISBN 0-7735-1322-1
- Litt, Paul. Trudeaumania. Vancouver: UBC Press, 2016.
- Lotz, Jim. Prime Ministers of Canada, 1987.
- McDonald, Kenneth. His pride, our fall: recovering from the Trudeau revolution. Toronto: Key Porter Books, c1995. ISBN 1-55013-714-X
- McIlroy, Thad, ed. A Rose is a rose: a tribute to Pierre Elliott Trudeau in cartoons and quotas. Toronto: Doubleday, 1984. ISBN 0-385-19787-X ISBN 0-385-19788-8
- Mills, Allen. Citizen Trudeau: An Intellectual Biography, 1944-1965. Toronto: Oxford University Press, 2016.
- Nemni, Max and Nemni, Monique. Young Trudeau: Son of Quebec, Father of Canada, 1919–1944. Toronto: Douglas Gibson Books, 2006. ISBN 0-7710-6749-6 (Based on private papers and diaries of Pierre Trudeau which he gave the authors in 1995)
- Nemni, Max and Nemni, Monique. Trudeau Transformed: The Shaping of a Statesman, 1944-1965. Toronto: McClelland and Stewart, 2011.
- Nemni, Max, Nemni, Monique, and Milne, David. Trudeau as Statesman, 1965-2000. Toronto; Dundurn Press, 2025.
- Peterson, Roy. Drawn & quartered: the Trudeau years. Toronto: Key Porter Books, 1984.
- Plamondon, Bob. The Truth About Trudeau. Ottawa: Great River Media, 2013. ISBN 978-0-9868242-1-0
- Radwanski, George. Trudeau. New York: Taplinger Pub. Co., 1978. ISBN 0-8008-7897-3
- Raymaker, Darryl. Trudeau's Tango: Alberta Meets Pierre Elliott Trudeau, 1968-1972. Edmonton: University of Alberta Press, 2017.
- Ricci, Nino. Extraordinary Canadians Pierre Elliott Trudeau (2009)
- Sawatsky, John. The Insiders: Government, Business, and the Lobbyists, 1987.
- Simpson, Jeffrey. Discipline of power: the Conservative interlude and the Liberal restoration. Toronto: Macmillan of Canada, 1984. ISBN 0-920510-24-8
- Stewart, Walter. Shrug: Trudeau in power. Toronto: New Press, 1971. ISBN 0-88770-081-0
- Southam, Nancy. Pierre, McClelland & Stewart, September 19, 2006, 408 pages ISBN 978-0-7710-8168-2
- Simard, François-Xavier. Le vrai visage de Pierre Elliott Trudeau, Montréal: Les Intouchables, April 19, 2006 ISBN 2-89549-217-4
- Vastel, Michel. The outsider: the life of Pierre Elliott Trudeau. Toronto: Macmillan of Canada, c1990. 266 pages. Translation of: Trudeau, le Québécois. ISBN 0-7715-9100-4
- Walters, Eric. Voyageur, Toronto: Penguin Groups 2008
- Wright, Robert. Three Nights in Havana: Pierre Trudeau, Fidel Castro and the Cold War World. Toronto: HarperCollins, 2007.
- Wright, Robert. Trudeaumania: The Rise to Power of Pierre Elliott Trudeau. Toronto; Harper Collins, 2016.
- Zink, Lubor J. Trudeaucracy. Toronto: Toronto Sun Publishing Ltd., 1972. 150 pages. OCLC 837009381.

Works by Trudeau

- Memoirs. Toronto: McClelland & Stewart, c1993. ISBN 0-7710-8588-5
- Towards a just society: the Trudeau years, with Thomas S. Axworthy, (eds.) Markham, Ont.: Viking, 1990.
- The Canadian Way: Shaping Canada's Foreign Policy 1968–1984, with Ivan Head
- Two innocents in Red China. (Deux innocents en Chine rouge), with Jacques Hébert 1960.
- Against the Current: Selected Writings, 1939–1996. (À contre-courant: textes choisis, 1939–1996). Gerard Pelletier (ed)
- The Essential Trudeau. Ron Graham, (ed.) Toronto: McClelland & Stewart, c1998. ISBN 0-7710-8591-5
- The asbestos strike. (Grève de l'amiante), translated by James Boake 1974
- Pierre Trudeau Speaks Out on Meech Lake. Donald J. Johnston, (ed). Toronto: General Paperbacks, 1990. ISBN 0-7736-7244-3
- Approaches to politics. Introd. by Ramsay Cook. Prefatory note by Jacques Hébert. Translated by I. M. Owen. from the French Cheminements de la politique. Toronto: Oxford University Press, 1970. ISBN 0-19-540176-X
- Federalism and the French Canadians. Introd. by John T. Saywell. 1968
- Conversation with Canadians. Foreword by Ivan L. Head. Toronto, Buffalo: University of Toronto Press 1972. ISBN 0-8020-1888-2
- The best of Trudeau. Toronto: Modern Canadian Library. 1972 ISBN 0-919364-08-X
- Lifting the shadow of war. C. David Crenna, editor. Edmonton: Hurtig, c1987. ISBN 0-88830-300-9
- Human rights, federalism and minorities. (Les droits de l'homme, le fédéralisme et les minorités), with Allan Gotlieb and the Canadian Institute of International Affairs

== Joe Clark ==
- Brown, Patrick; Chodos, Robert; Murphy, Rae (1976). Winners, Losers: The 1976 Tory Leadership Convention. Toronto: James Lorimer & Company. ISBN 0-88862-104-3.
- Humphreys, David L. (1978). Joe Clark: A Portrait. Toronto: Deneau and Greenberg Publishers Ltd. ISBN 0-00-216169-9.
- Nolan, Michael (1978). Joe Clark: The Emerging Leader. Toronto: Fitzhenry & Whiteside. ISBN 0-88902-436-7.
- Troyer, Warner (1980). 200 Days: Joe Clark in Power. Toronto: Personal Library, Publishers. ISBN 0-920510-05-1.
- Simpson, Jeffrey (1984). Discipline of Power: the Conservative Interlude and the Liberal Restoration. Macmillan of Canada. ISBN 0-920510-24-8.
- Graham, Ron (1986). One-Eyed Kings: Promise & Illusion in Canadian Politics. Toronto: Collins Publishers. ISBN 0-00-217642-4.
- The Insiders: Government, Business, and the Lobbyists, by John Sawatsky, 1987.
- Mulroney: The Politics of Ambition, by John Sawatsky, Toronto 1991, MacFarlane, Walter, and Ross publishers.
- Memoirs, by Pierre Elliott Trudeau, Toronto 1993, McClelland & Stewart publishers, ISBN 0-7710-8587-7.
- A Nation Too Good to Lose: Renewing the Purpose of Canada, by Joseph Clark, Toronto 1994, Key Porter Books, ISBN 1-55013-603-8.
- In My Own Name, by Maureen McTeer, 2003.
- The Secret Mulroney Tapes, edited by Peter C. Newman, 2006.
- Memoirs 1939–1993, by Brian Mulroney, 2007.

== John Turner ==
- Litt, Paul (2011). Elusive Destiny:The Political Vocation of John Napier Turner. UBC Press. ISBN 978-0-7748-2267-1.
- Cahill, Jack (1984). John Turner: The Long Run. Toronto: McClelland & Stewart. ISBN 978-0-7710-1872-5. OCLC 12051468.
- Snider, Norman (1985). The Changing of the Guard: How the Liberals Fell From Grace. Toronto: Lester & Orpen Dennys. ISBN 978-0-88619-090-3. OCLC 13077179.
- Weston, Greg (1988). Reign of Error: the Inside Story of John Turner's Troubled Leadership. Toronto: McGraw-Hill Ryerson. ISBN 978-0-07-549693-9. OCLC 19110646.
- Mulroney: The Politics of Ambition, by John Sawatsky, Toronto 1991, McFarlane, Walter, and Ross publishers, ISBN 0-921912-06-4.
- Turner, John. Politics With Purpose, 40th anniversary edition, McGill-Queen's University Press, 2008.
- Paikin, Steve (2022). John Turner: An Intimate Biography of Canada's 17th Prime Minister. Toronto, Ontario: Sutherland House Books. ISBN 978-1-989555-83-5. OCLC 1313801194.

== Brian Mulroney ==
- Blake, Raymond B. ed. Transforming the Nation: Canada and Brian Mulroney (McGill-Queen's University Press), 2007. 456pp; ISBN 978-0-7735-3214-4
- Winners, Losers, by Patrick Brown (journalist), Rae Murphy, and Robert Chodos, 1976.
- Brian Mulroney: The Boy from Baie Comeau, by Nick Auf der Maur, Rae Murphy, and Robert Chodos, 1984.
- Mulroney: The Making of the Prime Minister, by L. Ian MacDonald, 1984.
- The Insiders: Government, Business, and the Lobbyists, by John Sawatsky, 1987.
- Selling Out: Four Years of the Mulroney Government, by Eric Hamovitch, Rae Murphy, and Robert Chodos, 1988.
- Friends in high places: politics and patronage in the Mulroney government, by Claire Hoy, 1989.
- Mulroney: The Politics of Ambition, by John Sawatsky, 1991.
- On the Take: Crime, Corruption and Greed in the Mulroney Years, by Stevie Cameron, 1994.
- Presumed Guilty: Brian Mulroney, the Airbus Affair, and the Government of Canada, by William Kaplan, 1998.
- The Last Amigo: Karlheinz Schreiber and the Anatomy of a Scandal, by Stevie Cameron and Harvey Cashore, 2001.
- A Secret Trial: Brian Mulroney, Stevie Cameron, and the Public Trust, by William Kaplan, 2004.
- The Secret Mulroney Tapes: Unguarded Confessions of a Prime Minister, by Peter C. Newman, 2005.
- Master of Persuasion: Brian Mulroney's Global Legacy, by Fen Osler Hampson, 2018.

== Kim Campbell ==
- Campbell, Kim. (1996). Time and Chance: The Political Memoirs of Canada's First Woman Prime Minister. Doubleday Canada, 434 pages. ISBN 978-0385255271
- Dobbin, Murray (1993). The Politics of Kim Campbell: From School Trustee to Prime Minister. Lorimer. pp. 180. ISBN 1-55028-413-4.

== Jean Chrétien ==
- Martin, Lawrence (1995). Chrétien: The Will to Win. Toronto: Lester Publishing. ISBN 1-895555-95-7.
- Martin, Lawrence (2003). Iron Man: The Defiant Reign of Jean Chrétien. Toronto: Penguin Group (Canada). ISBN 0-670-04310-9.
- Double Vision: The Inside Story of the Liberals in Power, by Edward Greenspon and Anthony Wilson-Smith, Toronto 1996, Doubleday Canada publishers, ISBN 0-385-25613-2.
- The Shawinigan Fox: How Jean Chrétien Defied the Elites and Reshaped Canada, by Bob Plamondon, Ottawa 2017, Great River Media, ISBN 978-1-7750981-1-9.
- Flanagan, Tom. (2022). Pivot or Pirouette? The 1993 Canadian General Election. Vancouver: University of British Columbia Press.
- McWhinney, Edward (2003). Chrétien and Canadian Federalism: Politics and the Constitution, 1993–2003. Vancouver: Ronsdale Press. ISBN 1-55380-006-0.

== Paul Martin ==
- Martin, Paul (2009). Hell or High Water: My Life in and out of Politics. Emblem Edition. ISBN 978-0-7710-5693-2.; Autobiography
- Gray, John (2003). Paul Martin: The Power of Ambition. Key Porter Books. ISBN 978-1-55263-217-8.
- Wells, Paul. (2007) Right Side Up: The Fall of Paul Martin and the Rise of Stephen Harper's New Conservatism (Douglas Gibson Books) 344 pp ISBN 978-0-7710-8855-1
- Wilson-Smith, Anthony; Greenspon, Edward (1996). Double Vision: The Inside Story of the Liberals in Power. Doubleday Canada. ISBN 0-385-25613-2.

== Stephen Harper ==
- Chantal, Hébert. (2007) French Kiss: Stephen Harper's Blind Date with Quebec Vintage Canada, ISBN 978-0-676-97908-4
- Flanagan, Tom. (2009) Harper's Team: Behind the Scenes in the Conservative Rise to Power (2nd ed), ISBN 978-0-7735-3545-9
- Gutstein, Donald. Harperism: How Stephen Harper and his Think Tank Colleagues Have Transformed Canada. Toronto: Lorimer, 2014.
- Harris, Michael. (2014) Party of One: Stephen Harper And Canada's Radical Makeover, 554 pp. Viking; Second Impression edition. ISBN 978-0-670-06701-5
- Ibbitson, John. (2015) Stephen Harper, 448 pp. Signal. ISBN 978-0-7710-4703-9.
- Mackey, Lloyd. (2005) "The pilgrimage of Stephen Harper" ECW Press ISBN 1-55022-713-0
- Martin, Lawrence. "Harperland: The Politics of Control" Viking Canada (2010). ISBN 978-0-670-06517-2
- Wells, Paul. (2007) Right Side Up: The Fall of Paul Martin and the Rise of Stephen Harper's New Conservatism Douglas Gibson Books, 344 Pages ISBN 978-0-7710-8855-1
- Wells, Paul (2013). The Longer Im Prime Minister Stephen Harper And Canada 2006. Toronto: Random House. ISBN 978-0-307-36132-5.

== Justin Trudeau ==
- Trudeau, Justin. (2014) Common Ground. HarperCollins Publishers, 352 Pages. ISBN 978-1-4434-3337-2
- Ivison, John. (2019) Trudeau: The Education of a Prime Minister. Signal, 368 Pages. ISBN 978-0771048951
- Lukacs, Martin. (2019) The Trudeau Formula: Seduction and Betrayal in an Age of Discontent. Black Rose Books, 295 Pages. ISBN 9781551647487
- Maher, Stephen. (2024) The Prince: The Turbulent Reign of Justin Trudeau. Simon and Schuster.
- Wells, Paul. (2024) Justin Trudeau on the Ropes: Governing in Troubled Times Sutherland House.
- Wherry, Aaron. (2019) Promise and Peril: Justin Trudeau in Power. HarperCollins Publishers, 368 Pages. ISBN 978-1443458276

== Mark Carney ==
- Carney, Mark. (2021) Values: Building a Better World for All. Signal Books, 600 Pages. ISBN 978-0-7710-5155-5

== See also ==
- Bibliography of Canada
- Bibliography of Canadian history
- Bibliography of Canadian military history
- Bibliography of Nova Scotia
- Bibliography of Saskatchewan history
- Bibliography of Alberta history
- Bibliography of British Columbia
- Bibliography of the 1837–38 insurrections in Lower Canada
- List of books about the War of 1812
