= Sid Barron =

Canadian cartoonist (1917–2006)

- Cover of The Barron Book, a 1972 anthology of editorial cartoons, includes typical biplane and "puddy tat"
- Born: June 13, 1917; Toronto, Ontario
- Died: April 29, 2006 (aged 88); Victoria, BC
- Known for: Editorial cartoons

Sidney Arnold Barron (June 13, 1917 in Toronto – April 29, 2006 in Victoria, British Columbia) was a Canadian editorial cartoonist and artist. During his career as a cartoonist, he drew for the Victoria Times, the Toronto Star, Maclean's, and The Albertan. His cartoons were satirical takes on social mores, and often contained a biplane towing a banner, and a bored-looking cat, holding a card bearing a wry comment. Later in life, Barron moved to Vancouver Island, where he and his wife opened an art studio and gallery.

== Early life ==
During the First World War, Sid Barron's mother, Daisy Hilda Wormald, moved from England to her married sister Florence's household in Toronto after becoming pregnant by a Belgian soldier billeted with her parents. Daisy's child Sidney was born in Toronto on June 13, 1917. Florence and her husband adopted the baby and moved to Victoria when Sidney was 2. (Barron grew up believing Florence was his mother and Daisy was his aunt, and would not discover the truth until he was an adult). He attended South Park Elementary School and Victoria High School and grew up around the shipping port at Victoria’s breakwater, where he developed a passion for sketching boats. He had a pronounced stammer as a child, and was treated for it at age 21 at the National Hospital for Speech Disorders in New York.

== Comic book artist ==
Example of Barron's densely illustrated style from Toronto Star, December 1970, included both biplane trailing sign in upper right corner and "puddy-tat" holding sign along bottom edge

After graduating from high school, Barron found work as a sign painter and commercial illustrator during the Great Depression, producing, among other things, schedule cards for Union Steamships. At age 21, he took his first formal art classes from young art prodigy Allan Edwards (along with Pierre Berton), and did some illustrations for Toronto's Star Weekly. During the Second World War, Barron worked in the Canadian comic book industry, producing comics for Canadian Heroes Comics, published by Educational Comics. He started to paint harbours, ships and beach scenes in watercolour and tempera (but not oil paints because he was allergic to them). He also did some war illustrations for the Toronto Star.

Following the war, Barron received some art training in Detroit. He was used by the Star Weekly as a freelance illustrator until the magazine began purchasing illustrations from American syndicates as a cost-saving measure. He then spent the rest of the 1950s seeking work in B.C. and Ontario.

== Editorial cartoonist ==
In 1958 Stu Keate, publisher of the Victoria Daily Times, asked Barron to produce editorial cartoons. In 1961, Pierre Berton introduced Barron to the editor of the Toronto Star, and Barron moved to Toronto to begin a 30-year relationship with the Star, starting as an alternate to cartoonist Duncan Macpherson. In 1962, he moved to Calgary to produce work for The Albertan while still selling pieces to the Star. In 1964, he started selling cartoons to MacLean's.

His black-and-white cartoons were densely filled with small details, and commented satirically on the absurdity of modern and suburban life. Critic Robert Fulford called him "the poet of the mundane." Journalist Brenda Gough characterized his work as "relatively mild yet satirically insightful topical cartoons of social mores and suburbia [that] utilized a clear line and elegant, unexaggerated figures placed in extremely cluttered backgrounds full of sight gags and signs."

Two distinctive "trademarks" that often appeared in his works were a bored-looking "puddy-tat" holding a sign with a sardonic comment, and sometimes a biplane with a trailing banner.

== Artist ==
Barron had been married twice before when he met fellow artist Jesi at an art therapy class in 1975, and married her in 1977. After the National Archives of Canada and the Glenbow Museum bought many of his original cartoons, he was able to retire as a cartoonist, and he and Jesi travelled for several years. In 1989, they moved to Coombs, British Columbia on Vancouver Island, where they opened an art gallery to sell their work. During this period, Barron created watercolours of beach scenes and nautical themes.

In 1997, the Barrons moved to Victoria. Ten years later, Sid Barron died at Mount St. Mary Hospital, on April 29, 2006, age 88.

== Legacy ==
Collections of Barron's work can be found at the Art Gallery of Greater Victoria, the Glenbow Museum, the National Archives of Canada, the Okanagan Heritage Museum and in private collections in Canada and the USA.

=== Education ===
- 1945 Meitzinger Institute, Detroit Michigan, USA
- 1941 Vancouver School of Art, Vancouver, BC
- 1940 Private Lessons with Alan Edwards, Victoria

== Exhibitions ==
=== Solo ===
- 2010 Ship Shapes, Polychrome Fine Arts, Victoria BC, Canada
- 1976 Sid Barron, Open Space, Victoria
- 1973 Sid Barron, Paintings and Collages, Art Gallery of Greater Victoria
- 1965 Mr.Sid Barron, Canadian Art Galleries, Calgary
- 1949 Sid Barron, Vancouver Art Gallery, Vancouver

=== Duo ===
- 1992 A Lifetime of Explorations, Sid & Jesi, Nanaimo Art Gallery, Nanaimo
- 1991 Sid & Jesi Barron, The Old School House Gallery, Qualicum
- 1983 Sid & Jesi Barron, The Little Gallery, Victoria
- 1981 The Art Gallery At The Crystal (Sid & Jesi Barron), Crystal Gardens, Victoria
- 1979 Sid & Jesi Barron, The Little Gallery, Victoria
- 1978 Barron & Jesi, Watercolours & Drawings, The Little Gallery, Victoria
- 1977 Sid & Jesi Barron, Santa Cruz, California, USA
- 1977 Sid & Jesi Barron, Majorca, Spain

=== Group ===
- 2011 Hobnob 3, Polychrome Fine Arts, Victoria BC, Canada
- 2010 Wish List, Polychrome Fine Arts, Victoria BC, Canada
- 2010 Hobnob 2, Polychrome Fine Arts, Victoria BC, Canada
- 1995 La Fleur Invitational Exhibition, The Old School House, Qualicum
- 1995 The Circle Show, Barron’s Country Gallery, Coombs
- 1995 Studio Show, Barron’s Country Gallery, Coombs
- 1994 Studio Show, Barron’s Art Centre, Coombs
- 1994 Arts & Crafts Jury Show, District 69 Community Arts Council, Qualicum
- 1993 Studio Show, Barron’s Art Centre, Coombs
- 1992 Expose Yourself, Eagleshore Gallery, Qualicum
- 1992 Ten Faces, District 69 Community Arts Council, Parksville
- 1992 Studio Show, Barron’s Art Centre, Coombs
- 1992 6th Annual Garden Party & Art Auction, The Old School House, Qualicum
- 1991 Studio Show, Barron’s Art Centre, Coombs
- 1990 Studio Show, Barron’s Art Centre, Coombs
- 1989 A View Of The World From Ontario, John B. Aird Gallery, Toronto
- 1988 Studio Show, Barron’s Art Centre, Coombs
- 1987 Studio Show, Barron’s Art Centre, Coombs
- 1981 Penticton International Auction of Fine Art, Penticton Arts Council, Penticton
- 1979 Spring Show ’79, The Little Gallery, Victoria
- 1978 Leafhill Galleries, Victoria
- 1973 The Little Gallery, Victoria
- 1967 Cartoon Sale, Alberton, Calgary
- 1958 B.C. Paintings-Burnaby 58, Burnaby
- 1958 18th Quarterly Group Exhibition, Vancouver Art Gallery, Vancouver
- 1957 17th Quarterly Group Exhibition, Vancouver Art Gallery, Vancouver

== Publications ==
- 1989 Portfoolio ‘89 Canadian Caricature, Macmillan, Toronto
- 1988 Portfoolio ‘88 Canadian Caricature, Eden Press, Montreal
- 1987 Portfoolio ‘87 Canadian Caricature, Guy Badeaux, Croc Publishing, Ludcom Inc. Montreal
- 1986 Portfoolio ‘86 Canadian Caricature, Guy Badeaux, Croc Publishing, Ludcom Inc. Montreal
- 1985 The Best of Barron, Lester & Orpen Dennys Ltd, Toronto
- 1981 Penticton International Auction of Fine Art, Penticton Arts Council, Penticton
- 1972 The Barron Book (With Puddytat Centerfold), Star Reader Service, Toronto
- 1968 A Scar Is Born by Eric Nicol, Illustrated by Barron, The Ryerson Press, Toronto
- 1967 Barron’s Calgary Cartoons Vol.1, The Alberton, Calgary
- 1960 2nd Annual Barron’s Victoria, Victoria Times, Victoria
- 1959 Barron’s Victoria: cartoons selected from the Victoria Times, Victoria
- 1965 “Barron's Toronto” Star Reader Service, Toronto
- 1958 B.C. Paintings: Burnaby 58 / [Alvin L. Balkind], Burnaby Centennial Committee
- 1944 “A Christmas Carol” for colouring, Educational Products Inc.

== Reviews ==
- 2010 June 19, “Barron Much More Than A Cartoonist,”, Robert Amos, Times Colonist
- 2006 May 15, “Sid Barron, Cartoonist 1917-2006”, Tom Hawthorn, The Globe and Mail
- 1998 Sat. Sept. 25, “Photos overlaid with paint may be ...”, Robert Amos, Times Colonist
- 1998 Tues. Mar. 24, “A Tale Of Two Well Known BC Artists”, Parksville Qualicum Beach News
- 1995 Fri.April 28, “Cartoonist Finds Joy In Painting”, Parksville Qualicum Beach News
- 1995 “Circle Show In For Good Cause”, Nancy Whelan, Parksville Qualicum Beach News
- 1994 Tues. May 24, “Coombs Gallery Home To Ten Artists”, Parksville Qualicum Beach News
- 1993 Aug. “Cartoonist Would Rather Be Great Painter”, Corinne Jackson, Island Senior
- 1993 May 2, “Coombs Couple Quietly Waiting to be Discovered”, Sandra McCulloch, Horizons
- 1992 Thur. Aug. 27, “Artists Capture Friends On Canvas”, Jane Lyons, P-Q Magazine
- 1992 Mon. May 11, Exhibition To Open At College Art Gallery, The Bulletin
- 1992 Tues. June 16, B2, “Arts Council Opens Ten Faces”, Parksville-Qualicum Beach News
- 1991 Tues. April 2, A29, “Local Artists Featured In Festival”, Parksville-Qualicum Beach News
- 1991 Sat. April 6, “Barrons Are Pros In A Neighbourhood of ...”, Robert Amos, Times Colonist
- 1990 June 15, “Barrons Bloom Anew”, Charles Hart, The Arrowsmith Star
- 1990 (exhibition review) Robert Amos, Times Colonist
- 1989 Jan. 25, “Sun Cartoonists Put On Show Over ‘ome”, pg.17, Financial Post
- 1989 August 12, “Way To Go, Sooke...”, Robert Amos, Times Colonist
- 1987 August 9, “Drawing Toronto from the Coast”, R.S. Diotte, Islander
- 1987 February 21, “Creative Output Of The Remarkable Barron”, R. Amos, Times Colonist
- 1985 “He Draws Anyplace”, Dan Smith, Toronto Star, Toronto
- 1985 October 17, “The Barron of Toronto”, Richard Van Dine, pg.9, Monday Magazine
- 1981 November 6, Exhibition Review, pg.9 Times Colonist
- 1979 Around The Galleries (exhibition review), Times Colonist
- 1979 Jan.11, “Cartoonist Gather To Hear Bierman Case...”, pg.43, Daily Colonist
- 1979 December 7, “The Call of the Loon”, Monday Magazine
- 1977 “Suburban Sid Finds Spain Palette-able”, Jim Gibson, Colonist
- 1977 February 19, Edmonton Journal, Edmonton
- 1977 Interview, Monday Magazine
- 1976 September 23, “Barron Painting on Show”, Victoria Times
- 1973 “Arrival of An Artist-And Other Thoughts”, Jack Scott, Victoria Times
- 1973 Feb.7, “Will The Real Etaoin Shrdlu Please Stand Up”, pg.19, The Victorian
- 1972 October, “Barronland” Introduction by Robert Fulford
- 1967 “Barron’s Fan Mail All Sizes”, Shapes, Bob Blansjaar, The Albertan, Calgary
- 1967 Dec. “Always with Kindness”, Tom Primrose pg.10, ?
- 1957 Dec.10, 17th Quarterly Group Exhibition, v.25 no.4, VAG Bulletin, Vancouver
- 1949 June 25, “In the Realm Of Art”, Palette, Vancouver Province
- 1949 June 21, “Watercolour Display, Breezy, Vivacious”, M. Valley Thornton, Vancouver Sun

== Affiliations ==
- 1958-89 Syndicated Editorial Cartoonist
- 1979 Federation of Canadian Artists

== Professional Activities ==
- 1987-97 Co-owner of Barron’s Gallery, Coombs, BC
- 1961-89 Editorial Cartoonist for the Toronto Star
- 1961-66 Editorial Cartoonist for Maclean’s Magazine
- 1962 Editorial Cartoonist for The Albertan
- 1958-61 Editorial Cartoonist for the Victoria Times (Times Colonist)
- 1941-58 Commercial Artist, Neon Sign Designer, Illustrator for Educational Products Inc. Comics' Canadian Heroes, Union Steamships (Vancouver), and Billboard Painter (Toronto)
