= RTDNA Canada =

Canadian news journalism association

Radio Television Digital News Association of Canada
- Formerly: Radio-Television News Directors Association of Canada or RTNDA Canada
- Industry: Journalism
- Founded: 1962
- Key people: Fiona Conway (President)
- Website: rtdnacanada.com

The Radio Television Digital News Association of Canada, or RTDNA Canada, is a Canadian membership organization of radio, television and online journalists, news directors, producers, executives and educators. It was founded in 1962, as the Canadian equivalent of the Radio Television Digital News Association in the United States.

== History ==
The Radio and Television News Directors Association of Canada (RTNDA) was founded in 1962, to seek equal access to all types of news sources at a time when government agencies banned broadcast reporters from press conferences. Broadcast News manager Charles Edwards was the driving force behind the formation of the RTDNA. He had travelled across Canada to improve broadcast journalism, and instituted annual regional meetings to raise the standards for broadcast news directors.

The RTNDA Canada changed its name to Radio Television Digital News Association of Canada, or RTDNA Canada, in 2009.

The RTDNA code of ethics is the guideline by which the CBSC makes its rulings regarding complaints about radio and television broadcasts. RTDNA Canada has over 400 member stations.

== Awards ==
In 1967, the RTNDA renamed its annual award for spot news reporting to the Charlie Edwards Award, in recognition of Charles Edwards.

RTDNA has issued a Lifetime Achievement award since 2019 and has been issuing local, regional, and national awards for outstanding journalism since 2021. It maintains a Hall of Fame list of individuals who have made an "outstanding contribution" to journalism.

== See also ==
- Canadian Broadcast Standards Council
- Canadian Radio-television and Telecommunications Commission
