= Christie Blatchford =

Canadian journalist

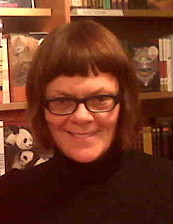
- Blatchford on November 21, 2008
- Born: Christie Marie Blatchford; May 20, 1951; Rouyn-Noranda, Quebec, Canada
- Died: February 12, 2020 (aged 68); Toronto, Ontario, Canada
- Education: Ryerson University
- Occupations: newspaper columnist, writer and broadcaster
- Years active: 1972–2019
- Notable credit(s): The Globe and Mail (1972–1977; 2003–2011); Toronto Star (1977–1982); Toronto Sun (1982–1998); National Post (1998–2003; 2011–2019)
- Spouses: Jim Oreto (m. 1977; div. 1981); David Rutherford (divorced)

Christie Marie Blatchford (May 20, 1951 – February 12, 2020) was a Canadian newspaper columnist, journalist and broadcaster. She published four non-fiction books.

Blatchford was Canada's first female sports columnist, reporting on sports between 1975 and 1977. In her 48-year career she worked for all four Toronto-based newspapers, winning the 1999 National Newspaper Award for column writing. She was inducted into the Canadian News Hall of Fame in 2019. Her book Fifteen Days: Stories of Bravery, Friendship, Life and Death from Inside the New Canadian Army also won the 2008 Governor General's Literary Award in Non-fiction.

== Early years and family ==
Blatchford was born in Rouyn-Noranda, Quebec, the daughter of Kathleen and Ross Blatchford. Her father, who was in the Royal Canadian Air Force during World War II, managed a hockey arena in Noranda. When Blatchford was in grade 11, the family moved to Toronto when her father became manager of the North Toronto Memorial Arena. She attended North Toronto Collegiate Institute, graduating in 1970. She then studied journalism at Ryerson University, and worked for the student paper The Ryersonian.

Blatchford had a number of journalists in her family. Her grandfather, Andy Lytle was a sports writer and editor for the Vancouver Sun in the 1920s and again in the 1950s and a sports editor at the Toronto Daily Star in the 1930s and 1940s. Her uncle, Tommy Lytle, was a Toronto Star editor until his retirement in 1974. Her nephew is sports reporter Andy Blatchford.

== Career ==
Blatchford began working part-time for The Globe and Mail in 1972, while still studying journalism at Ryerson, where she graduated at the top of her class. She was hired full-time by the Globe in 1973, working as a general assignment reporter and then as a sports columnist at the paper from 1975 until 1977; she was billed as Canada's first female sports columnist and was at the time one of only six female sports reporters in North America. Blatchford's first column "focused on Bobby Hull’s refusal to play in a World Hockey Association game". In it, she said: "It's the only game in the world we play as good as anyone else. But if we aren't careful, the people who make the decisions are going to take the guts and hardness out of hockey and they will do it because they think it is what we want."

Displeased when a Globe column was edited against her wishes, Blatchford then abruptly jumped to the competing Toronto Star, where she worked as a feature writer from 1977 to 1982, and began covering criminal trials in 1978, a beat she would return to throughout her career.

Looking to transition from a news reporter to a columnist, Blatchford proposed a light humour column to the Toronto Sun in 1982, chronicling her new relationship with a younger boyfriend, as well as her interactions with other friends and family. The Sun agreed to the proposal, although at a pay cut from her rate at the Star. Her column was originally in the paper's lifestyle section but moved to the high-profile page 5 feature column space previously occupied by Paul Rimstead, following his death in 1987. Blatchford remained at the Sun for 16 years, eventually transitioning back into news reporting and harder news features, by the late 1990s, notably covering high-profile trials such as those of Paul Bernardo and Karla Homolka.

In 1998, Blatchford moved to the newly launched National Post. In 1999, she received the National Newspaper Award for column writing. She left the Post to return to The Globe and Mail in 2003, working as a columnist there for eight years.

During four trips to Afghanistan in 2006–2007, Blatchford reported on the experiences of Canadian soldiers. Based on these experiences, she wrote the book Fifteen Days: Stories of Bravery, Friendship, Life and Death from Inside the New Canadian Army. The book went on to garner the 2008 Governor General's Literary Award in Non-fiction.

Blatchford returned once again to the National Post in 2011 and would remain there for the rest of her career. She was also a frequent panelist, commentator, contributor and guest on CFRB radio for several decades.

Blatchford's book Helpless: Caledonia's Nightmare of Fear and Anarchy, and How the Law Failed All of Us, concerning the Grand River land dispute, led to some controversy, including several members of the student body of the University of Waterloo protesting her speaking engagement and leading to its being cancelled on grounds of security.

In an article in the National Post online on August 22, 2011, Blatchford criticized the outpouring of support resulting from the death of federal NDP Leader and the Parliament of Canada's Leader of the Opposition Jack Layton, calling it "a public spectacle", and referring to Layton's "canonization". This caused an outcry toward Blatchford herself. Blatchford's commentary on the 2013 suicide of Rehtaeh Parsons also led to Parsons' father accusing Blatchford of victim blaming.

In June 2018, Blatchford said of a press subsidy: "God forbid Ottawa should start to subsidize newspapers too. As a journalist, the thought gives me the shudders."

== Illness and death ==
After having to cut short her assignment covering the 2019 federal election campaign due to nagging muscle pain, Blatchford was diagnosed in November 2019 with lung cancer which was found to have metastasized to bones in the spine and hip by the time it was detected. Blatchford was inducted into the Canadian News Hall of Fame the same month, but was unable to attend the ceremony.

Blatchford took leave from writing her column and sought treatment at Princess Margaret Cancer Centre, where she underwent several months of surgeries, radiation therapy, chemotherapy and immunotherapy. She died in Toronto on February 12, 2020.

== Bibliography ==
=== Non-fiction ===
==== Humour ====
In the 1980s, Blatchford published two collections of her humour-oriented Toronto Sun columns.

- Spectator Sports (1986)
- Close Encounters (1988)

==== Reportage ====
Beginning in 2007, Blatchford began publishing book-length non-fiction reportage.

- Fifteen Days: Stories of Bravery, Friendship, Life and Death from Inside the New Canadian Army (2007)
- The Black Hand: The Bloody Rise and Redemption of "Boxer" Enriquez, a Mexican Mob Killer (2008)
- Helpless: Caledonia's Nightmare of Fear and Anarchy, and How the Law Failed All of Us (2010)
- Life Sentence: Stories From Four Decades of Court Reporting - Or, How I Fell Out of Love with the Canadian Justice System (2016)

== See also ==
- List of newspaper columnists
