= Duncan Macpherson =

Canadian editorial cartoonist

- Jacket of best-selling Needham's Inferno (Macmillan of Canada, 1966), winner of the Stephen Leacock Memorial Medal for Humour. Illustration by Duncan Macpherson.
- Born: Duncan Ian Macpherson; September 20, 1924 Toronto, Ontario, Canada
- Died: May 3, 1993 (aged 68) Beaverton, Ontario, Canada
- Awards: CM
- Spouse: Dorothy Blackhall

Duncan Ian Macpherson, CM (September 20, 1924 in Toronto – May 3, 1993 in Beaverton, Ontario) was a Canadian editorial cartoonist. He drew for the Montreal Standard (starting 1948) and for Maclean's, illustrating the writings of Gregory Clark and Robert Thomas Allen. He is most famous for his humorous political cartoons for the Toronto Star; from 1958 until 1993. His syndicated cartoons appeared in seven other Canadian newspapers, in Time, The New York Times, Chicago Daily News and nearly 150 newspapers across the world.

== Career ==
Born in Toronto, Macpherson dropped out of high school in 1941, aged 17 to join the Royal Canadian Air Force and serve in World War II. While stationed in England, he began taking art classes, and also studied the cartoons of British cartoonist David Low. He left the army in 1946.

In 1947, with the death of his father he briefly took over the family textile business. In 1948, he studied at the school of Boston Museum of Fine Arts and also in that year he began working for the Montreal Standard. In 1950, he continued his course of study at the Ontario College of Art. In 1958, he joined the Toronto Star where readers tended to identify with "the poor little guy" in his cartoons. His work has been described as "a combination of Mary Poppins, Mark Twain, and Attila the Hun" with "peerless draftsmanship in the classical tradition — savagery made sublime". but his humour always was directed against pomposity of all kinds. Terry Mosher, the editorial cartoonist who draws under the name Aislin, in his book Professional Heckler: The Life and Art of Duncan Macpherson wrote of him:

"Macpherson drew as well, if not better, than any other Canadian artist who comes to mind. He combined that talent with a diamond-drill wit". "He inspired me and a generation (or two) of others working in the same field".

In 1965, Macpherson exhibited his work with its bold and distinctive brushwork at the Art Gallery of Toronto (later renamed the Art Gallery of Ontario). Among the books published by the Toronto Star and Macpherson of his work was MacPherson: World Events Reportage Drawings the Editorial Cartoon by John Brehl (1966). In 1969, Macpherson's Canada by Macpherson was published by The Star. In 1971, he produced a series of 100 drawings and 15 watercolours documenting the Front de libération du Québec trial. In 1978, Macmillan published Editorial cartoons 1978: 136 selected cartoons by Macpherson. In 1980, he retired from the Toronto Star for the first time. That same year, the Public Archives Canada (now Library and Archives Canada) did a travelling exhibition of his work titled A Daily Smile. On April 25, 1993, Macpherson retired a second time from the Star, and died eight days later.

There is a Duncan Macpherson fonds at Library and Archives Canada. The archival reference number is R5671. The material in the fonds dates from 1958 to 1988. It consists of 1,399 drawings and 18 watercolours. In 2013, aided by the R. Howard Webster Foundation and the Toronto Star newspaper, the McCord Museum purchased and made available online a complete collection of Duncan Macpherson editorial cartoons, known as the Duncan Macpherson Fonds in the McCord Museum, 751 caricatures and illustrations created by Macpherson.

== Political cartoons ==
Duncan Macpherson was well known for his ruthless style. Terry Mosher refers to him as the "king of the third wave." One of Macpherson's most celebrated cartoons featured John Diefenbaker as Marie Antoinette saying "Let them eat cake," after Diefenbaker cancelled the Avro Arrow project and its 14,000 jobs. Pierre Berton said this cartoon was "the beginning, I think, of the country's disillusionment with the Diefenbaker government...scarcely anybody had taken a crack at Diefenbaker until then."

== Awards and honours ==
- Molson Prize: 1971.
- National Newspaper Award for Editorial Cartooning: 1959, 1960, 1962, 1965, 1970, 1972.
- Royal Academy of Arts Medal (1966).
- News Hall of Fame: 1976.
- Member of the Order of Canada: 1987.
- Inducted posthumously into the Giants of the North Hall of Fame, as part of the 2018 Doug Wright Awards for Canadian Cartooning.

== Stamp news ==
In 2021, Canada Post honoured Macpherson with a stamp featuring his black-and-white "Thirsty or Hungry?" design, highlighting U.S. interests in Canada. It shows a large cat representing the United States sitting behind a fishbowl with the phrase "POWER RESEVOIR"[sic] along the waterline and a small fish with "CANADA" across its side. It was the fourth in a set of five honouring Canadian editorial cartoonists.
