= Serge Chapleau =

Canadian political cartoonist

Serge Chapleau CC
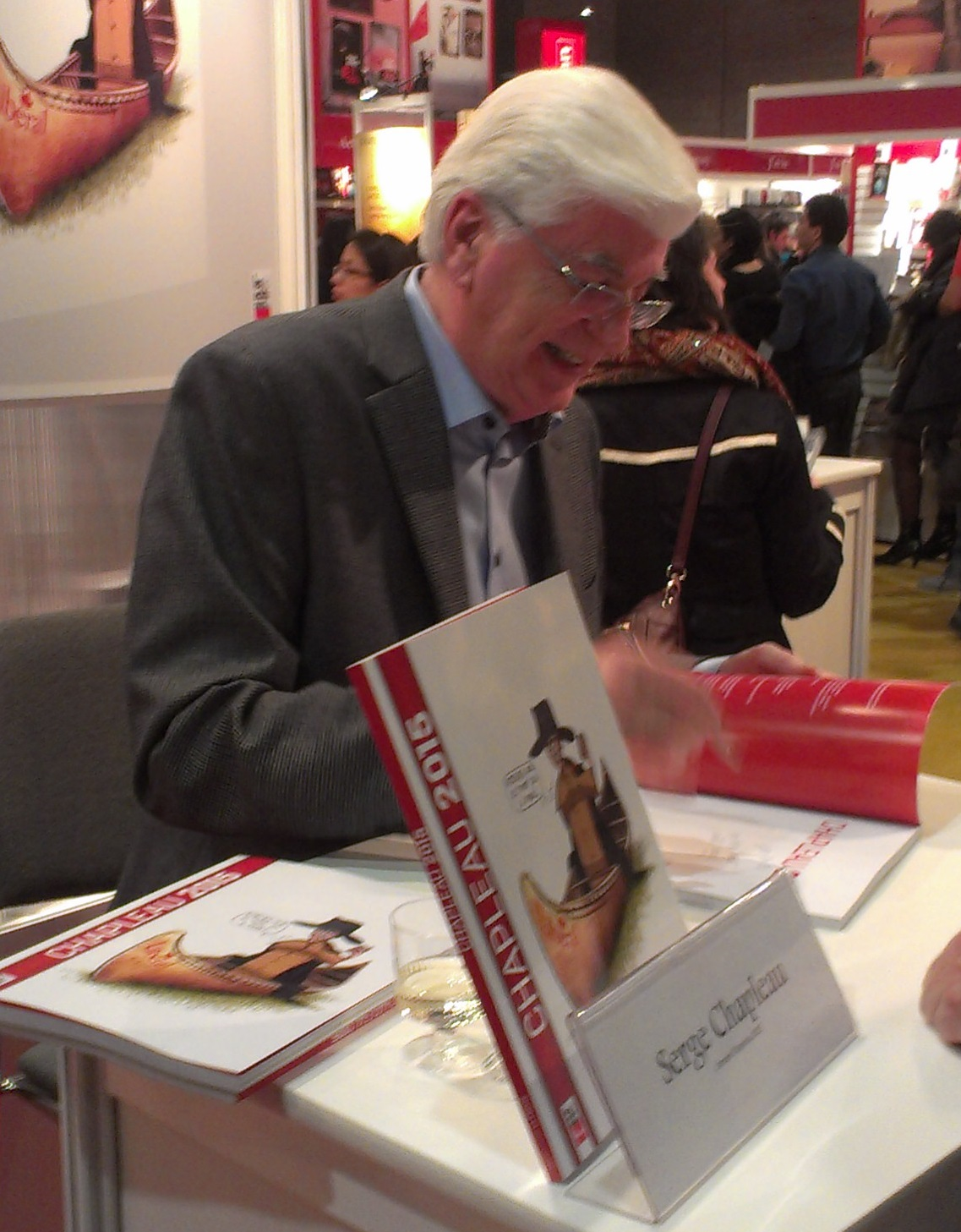
- Born: December 5, 1945 (age 80); Montreal, Quebec, Canada
- Occupation: Cartoonist

Serge Chapleau (French: [ʃaplo]; born 5 December 1945 in Montreal) is a Canadian political cartoonist.

== Biography ==
Born in Montreal, Quebec, the youngest in a family of seven children, Chapleau grew up in a blue collar neighbourhood in Montréal, where his childhood kingdom was the back alley of rue Drolet. After studying painting and graphic art at the School of Fine Arts, Montreal, in 1971 Chapleau created a caricature of the songbook Gilles Vigneault for Perspectives, a weekly paper distributed with the Saturday Editions of several Quebec dailies.

During the following years, Chapleau collaborated in several other publications, such as Montréal-Matin, Week-End, Actualité and Nous. Following Le Devoir in 1985, he worked at Le Matin in 1987, and 7 Jours from 1989 to 1992. After a return to Le Devoir in 1991, he became a cartoonist at La Presse in 1996, a post that he continues to occupy.

From 2004 to 2019, his puppet character Gérard D. Laflaque, returned to television in CGI form on Et Dieu créa Laflaque. He and fellow Montreal cartoonist Terry Mosher were the subject of a 2003 documentary film, Nothing Scared, directed by Garry Beitel.

Chapleau has Dupuytren's contracture, a hand disease in which the formation of scar tissue under the skin of the palm causes fingers to curl inward and lose the motion of the tendons' ability to grip.

== Honours and publications ==
For more than two decades Chapleau has been a finalist at the National Newspaper Awards of the Canadian Association of Newspapers in the Editorial Cartooning category; to date he has won the award on seven occasions.

Since 1993, Éditions du Boréal has published an annual collection of his best caricatures, L'année Chapleau.

From May 22, 1997, to September 20, 1998, the Musée McCord presented an exhibit on the works of Chapleau Aislin, Aislin & Chapleau Caricatures.

He was named a Member of the Order of Canada in 2015.
