= Gwyn Thomas (reporter) =

Canadian crime reporter

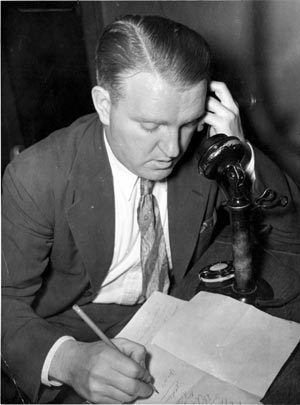
- Jocko Thomas in the 1930s
- Born: August 16, 1913; Toronto, Ontario, Canada
- Died: May 5, 2010 (aged 96); North York, Toronto, Ontario, Canada
- Other names: Jocko
- Occupation: Reporter
- Years active: 1930s–1989

Gwyn "Jocko" Thomas (August 16, 1913 – May 5, 2010) was a crime reporter with CFRB and the Toronto Star.

Born in Toronto, Thomas began his news career as a newsboy at the corner of Bathurst Street and Bloor Street in 1925. After one year of high school, Thomas was hired by the Toronto Star as a copyboy in 1929. He worked his way as a general reporter in the early 1930s to becoming the paper's crime reporter by 1939. In the 1960s, Thomas entered a new medium by becoming a radio crime reporter on CFRB.

Thomas' career involved covering the minor criminal activities in Toronto's suburbs, but also famous criminal stories:

- Christie Pits race riots in 1933.
- Stanley Buckowski on death row at California's San Quentin prison (1951); and execution 1952.
- Boyd Gang

Thomas is remembered for his sign-off at the end of his live radio news reports: "This is Jocko Thomas of The Toronto Star reporting to CFRB... from police headquarters."

Retired in 1989, Thomas died at a long-term care facility in North York at the age of 96.

== Awards ==
- National Newspaper Awards (3)
- local police reporting awards (9)
- member of the Canadian News Hall of Fame (1995)
