= Stu Keate =

Canadian journalist

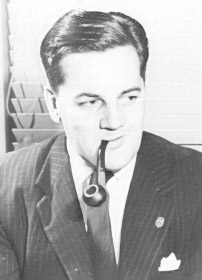
- Born: James Stuart Keate; October 13, 1913; Vancouver, British Columbia, Canada
- Died: March 1, 1987 (aged 73); Vancouver, British Columbia, Canada
- Education: University of British Columbia
- Occupation: Journalist
- Known for: Publisher of Victoria Daily Times and Vancouver Sun
- Spouse: Letha Meilicke (m. 1939)

James Stuart Keate OC (October 13, 1913 – March 1, 1987) was a Canadian journalist who rose through the ranks to become publisher of the Victoria Times from 1950 to 1964 and the Vancouver Sun from 1964 until his retirement in 1979. He also served as president of The Canadian Press and the Canadian Daily Newspaper Publishers Association. He was elected to the Canadian News Hall of Fame in 1974.

== Early life ==
Keate was born in Vancouver, B.C. in 1913, the son of William Lewis Keate, a timber broker on Vancouver Island. After high school, Keate attended University of British Columbia, where he began his journalism career writing for the student newspaper Ubyssey.

== Journalist ==
After he graduated in 1935, Keate worked as a sportswriter for The Province, and then became a feature writer for the Toronto Star. He met and married Letha Meilicke in 1939, and they had two children, Richard and Kathryn.

During the Second World War, Keate served in the Royal Canadian Navy as a war correspondent. He first was stationed on the East Coast of Canada, writing articles about Canada's new Tribal class destroyers. Keate was then assigned to the Canadian Naval Mission Overseas in London. In 1943, he served as information officer on HMCS Calgary in the North Atlantic. He was then posted to St. John's, Newfoundland for ten months before being transferred to Canada's first cruiser, HMCS Uganda, which sailed for the South Pacific.

Following the war, Keate worked for Time and Life, first in New York, and then as bureau chief in Montreal. On one assignment, he tried to track down Louis St. Laurent, then the Prime Minister of Canada, for an interview. When no one answered his knock at St. Laurent's home in Quebec City, he let himself in and left a note for St. Laurent on the front hall table.

== Publisher: Victoria Daily Times ==
In 1950, Canadian newspaper magnate Max Bell, through his company FP Publications, bought control of both the Victoria Colonist and the Victoria Times. Although Bell merged many of the business and production functions, he left the two newsrooms separate. He created the post of publisher in each newsroom, and hired Stu Keate to be the first publisher of the Victoria Daily Times.

=== The Sommers Scandal ===
In 1955, a storm erupted in the BC Legislature when Gordon Gibson, a member of the Liberal opposition, accused Robert Sommers, Social Credit Minister of Lands, Forests and Mines, of improperly awarding a forest management contract to E. P. Taylor's British Columbia Forest Products (BCFP). Keate and the Victoria Daily Times added fuel to the scandal with many articles exposing the close relationship between Sommers and BCFP, including the acceptance of gifts and services. As the scandal continued to grow, Sommers rose in the Legislature on February 27, 1956, and delivered a blistering attack on Keate, calling the continual stream of stories, "the most dirty and slanted coverage in the history of B.C., principally by Mr. Stuart Keate, the publisher of the Victoria Times." Sommers stated that the attacks on himself and his ministry by Stu Keate had occupied too much of the legislature's time, and in consequence, offered his resignation as cabinet minister to Premier W.A.C. Bennett. In their book about the scandal, Betty O'Keefe and Ian MacDonald related that "Urbane Victoria Times publisher Stu Keate was unrepentant, taking the resignation as a compliment to him and his paper."

Eight months after resigning from cabinet, Sommers was arrested and charged with bribery. He was found guilty on five of seven charges of receiving bribes, making him the first person in the British Commonwealth found guilty of conspiring to accept bribes while serving as a cabinet minister. He was sentenced to five years in jail and served 28 months.

=== Publicity events ===
Under Keate's management, the Times sponsored several publicity events. In 1954 the paper offered $7500 to English Channel swimmer Florence Chadwick to attempt the 18.5 mi (29.8 km) crossing of the Juan de Fuca Strait, with a $2500 bonus if she succeeded. Chadwick tried and failed in August 1954. The Times continued to offer a reward of $1000 for the first swimmer to succeed, and the following summer, Bert O. Thomas, an ex-U.S. Marine, claimed the prize. (A local businessman and the Port Angeles Chamber of Commerce added another $2500, bringing Thomas's reward to $3500.)

In 1955, Keate came up with the idea of creating the world's tallest free-standing totem pole, financed by the sale of 50-cent shares. The 127 foot 7 inch (38.73m) pole was subsequently carved by Kwakwaka’wakw artist Mungo Martin, his son David, and Henry Hunt. On the day of the unveiling in Beacon Hill Park in June 1956, the Victoria Daily Times published a 14-page "Totem Souvenir Edition" that listed the names of more than 10,000 people who had bought 50-cent shares, including Winston S. Churchill and Bing Crosby.

== Publisher: Vancouver Sun ==
In 1964, Max Bell asked Keate to move to Vancouver to became publisher of another FP Publications newspaper, the Vancouver Sun. When Keate took the helm, he characterized the Sun as "yeasty and aggressive, but nonetheless erratic and strongly partisan." He set out to temper this, writing in his memoirs that "The challenge was nothing less than a complete change in its character and personality."

Keate knew that creating a quality newspaper required money to hire good reporters; this caused disagreements with the general manager of FP Publications, who was more concerned with the bottom line than with improving the quality of the syndicate's newspapers. During his time with the Sun, Keate hired many notable journalists, including Allan Fotheringham, Denny Boyd, Bob Hunter (later a co-founder of Greenpeace), and Marjorie Nichols.

=== Mediator: This Hour Has Seven Days dispute ===
In the spring of 1966, a dispute arose between the CBC and the Toronto Producers' Association concerning the popular but controversial investigative news television program This Hour Has Seven Days. The program was known for ambushing prominent politicians and asking them hard-hitting questions. One of the most well-known of these was the unscheduled interview Larry Zolf conducted on the front doorstep of former federal Minister of Defence Pierre Sévigny concerning the Munsinger Affair. Concerned about the show's approach to the news, the CBC directors fired hosts Patrick Watson and Laurier LaPierre in April 1966, just before the end of the TV season, but without consulting with the program's executive producer Doug Leiterman. The resultant uproar resulted in a federal parliamentary committee being convened, and Prime Minister Lester B. Pearson invited Stu Keate to act as a neutral mediator to resolve the dispute.

Following two weeks of mediation, Keate said it was clear that there had been "mistakes made on both sides" and recommended that the CBC board of directors do a better job of explaining to the public its decision to fire Watson and LaPierre.

The CBC directors immediately reaffirmed the firing of Watson and LaPierre, while admitting that the way the two were fired had been a mistake. (Two months later, the dispute heated up again, Leiterman was fired, and This Hour Has Seven Days was cancelled.)

== Other industry involvement ==
From 1963 to 1969, Keate served on the Canada Council. In 1964 and again in 1965, Keate served as president of The Canadian Press. He also served as president of the Canadian Daily Newspapers Association during this time. He was founding chair of the Canadian Committee of the International Press Institute, and was a director of the Freedom of the Press Committee of the Inter-American Press Association.

In 1966, he turned down the offer of an appointment to the Canadian Senate made by the Liberal government of Lester B. Pearson, saying that if he accepted, it would compromise the Sun's independence.

== Retirement ==
Keate retired in 1979 after 15 years at the Sun. The following year he published his memoirs of the newspaper business in a book titled Paper Boy. He died in 1987 after a long battle with Parkinson's disease.

== Legacy ==
Former Sun columnist Allan Fotheringham called Keate "the last of the great publishers who had ever seen the insides of a typewriter." Journalist Mary McIver described Keate as "one of the breed of writer-publishers whose managerial skills appear to grow effortlessly out of their journalistic expertise." In a 2017 retrospective, John Mackie said of the Vancouver Sun that "the Keate era from 1964 to 1978 will probably go down as the best in the paper’s history [...] Keate was a journalist who ascended to the executive suite, but never let business get in the way of journalism."

== Awards & honours ==
- 1974: Elected to the Canadian News Hall of Fame
- 1976: Appointed Officer of the Order of Canada (Citation reads, "A journalist of distinction who has served his profession and his community with equal dedication.")
- 1983: Awarded with Honorary Doctorate of Laws, University of British Columbia
- 2020: Inducted into Business Laureates of British Columbia Hall of Fame
