= Charles Edwards (journalist) =

Canadian journalist and news agency executive (1906–1983)

- Born: August 10, 1906; Winnipeg, Manitoba, Canada
- Died: June 23, 1983 (aged 76); Delta, British Columbia, Canada
- Occupations: News agency executive; journalist
- Known for: The Canadian Press; Broadcast News; Press News
- Awards: Canadian News Hall of Fame; Canadian Association of Broadcasters Hall of Fame

Charles Brailsford Edwards (August 10, 1906 – June 23, 1983) was a Canadian journalist and news agency executive. He began in journalism as a sportswriter for the Regina Evening Post, The Leader, and the Winnipeg Free Press, before reporting for The Canadian Press (CP). He served as manager of CP's subsidiary Press News from 1944 to 1954, where he established the first French-language wire service for radio news broadcasters in North America, and established CP Picture Service to wire photographs to newspapers and television stations. He became the first manager of CP's subsidiary Broadcast News (BN) in 1954, then established the first national voice news wire service for broadcasters in Canada, which he transitioned into BN Voice. By the time he retired as manager in 1971, BN had grown to serve 298 radio and television stations in Canada.

The Province described Edwards as "one of the most influential figures in broadcast journalism in Canada". He negotiated peace and co-operation between radio broadcasters and newspapers in Canada, when they distrusted each other in competition for advertising. He was the driving force behind formation of the Radio and Television News Directors Association of Canada (RTNDA) in 1962, to give equal access to all types of news sources. In 1967, the RTNDA renamed its annual award for spot news reporting to the Charlie Edwards Award in his honour. He was made an honorary life member of multiple broadcasting associations, was inducted into the Canadian News Hall of Fame in 1972, and posthumously inducted into the Canadian Association of Broadcasters Hall of Fame in 1985.

== Early life and journalism career ==
Charles Brailsford Edwards was born in Winnipeg, Manitoba, on August 10, 1906. He grew up and was educated in the Saskatchewan cities, Moose Jaw and Regina. As a youth, he played rugby football, ice hockey, baseball, basketball, tennis and golf. He began in journalism during the late-1920s as a sports reporter for the Regina Evening Post and The Leader. When his family moved back to Winnipeg in 1928, he covered sports for the Winnipeg Free Press until the Great Depression. He subsequently worked as a writer in the publicity department of Canadian National Railway, driving a taxi, selling vacuums, and selling parimutuel betting tickets at a horse racing track in Winnipeg.

In Winnipeg at the horse racing track, Edwards met an editor from The Canadian Press (CP) which led to a six-week assignment in Toronto to report on curling. He was later assigned to Vancouver and covered the Canadian Championships of tennis in 1933. Subsequent CP posts for Edwards were Calgary, Winnipeg, Edmonton and Toronto. During World War II, he relayed a CP report on the torpedoing of SS Athenia without comment, even though his father was aboard the ship at the time. After the report, Edwards learned of his father's rescue. Edwards also reported on the first passenger fatality by Trans-Canada Air Lines. He travelled 20 miles (32 km) east from Armstrong, to the crash scene at Wagaming, by the only available transportation—an open-air railway handcar during −50 °C (−58 °F) temperature.

== News agency executive ==
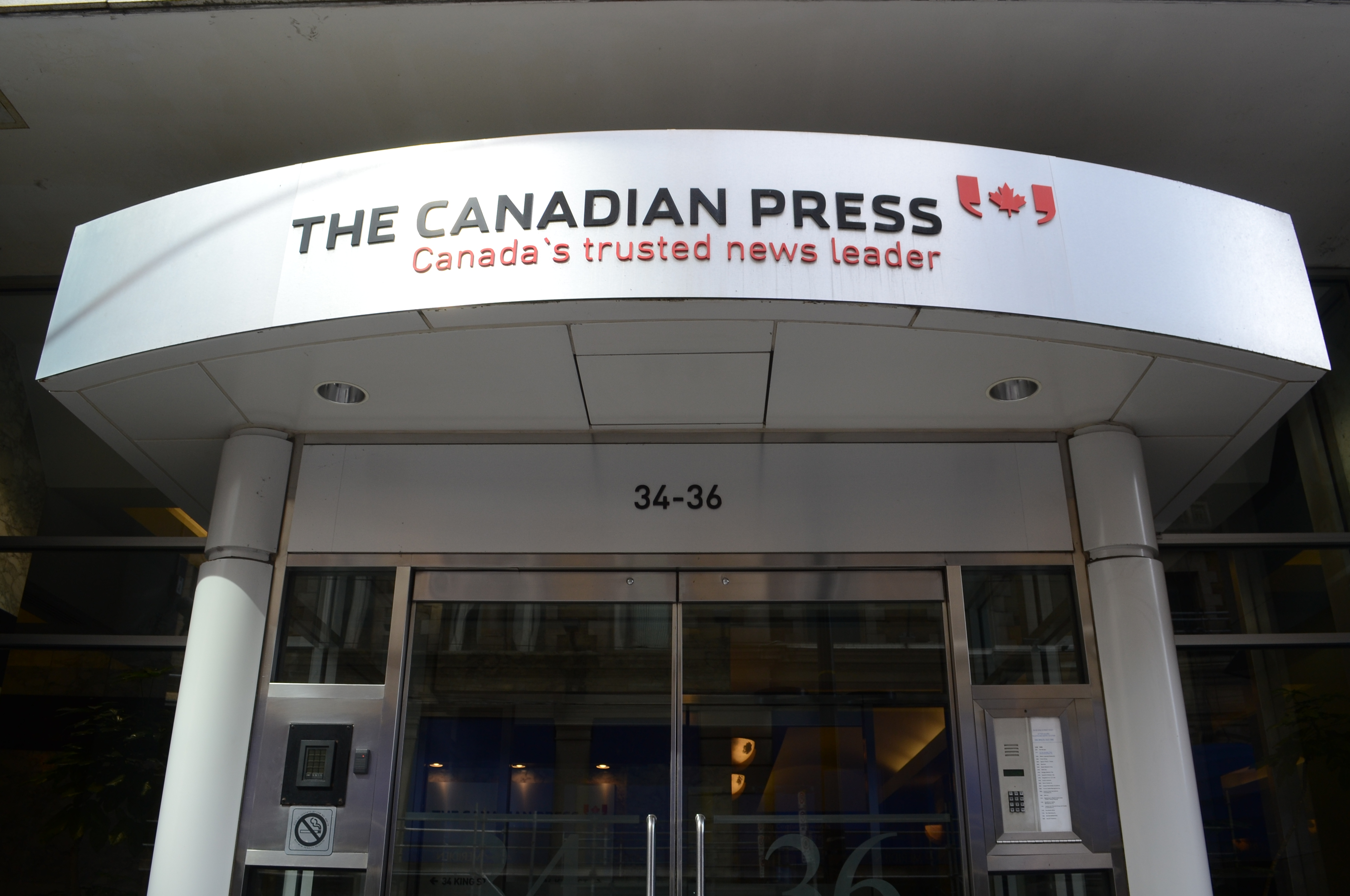
The Canadian Press headquarters

On March 27, 1944, Edwards was appointed manager of Press News Limited, the radio news subsidiary of CP. At the time, Press News served 35 of 90 radio stations in Canada, had a five-person staff in Toronto, and an annual budget of CA$90,000. When Edwards became manager of Press News, radio broadcasters and newspapers in Canada distrusted each other in competition for advertising money, and he was a frequent peacekeeper while convincing them to co-operate for their best interests.

In 1945, Edwards established a French-language radio news service, the first such wire service for French broadcasters in North America. He established CP Picture Service in 1948, to wire photographs to newspapers and television stations instead of the images being mailed via the postal service.

On January 1, 1954, CP replaced Press News with a new subsidiary, Broadcast News (BN). The venture operated in co-operation with private broadcasters, and supplied news reports to privately owned radio and television stations in Canada. Edwards was named the first manager and secretary of BN.

In 1956, Edwards established the first national voice news wire service for broadcasters in Canada. He transitioned the service into BN Voice in 1961, which then served 34 radio stations with national and international news.

Edwards travelled across Canada to improve broadcast journalism, and instituted annual regional meetings to raise the standards for broadcast news directors. He was the driving force behind formation of the Radio and Television News Directors Association of Canada (RTNDA) in 1962, to seek equal access to all types of news sources at a time when government agencies banned broadcast reporters from press conferences.

Edwards was appointed general manager and secretary of BN in 1966, and retired from both positions on August 10, 1971. BN had grown to serve 298 radio and television stations in Canada, and increased to 45 staff and a $2-million budget by 1971. By the time of his retirement, Edwards felt that he brought peace between print news and broadcast news, and that they realized one complimented the other in reporting breaking news.

== Personal life ==
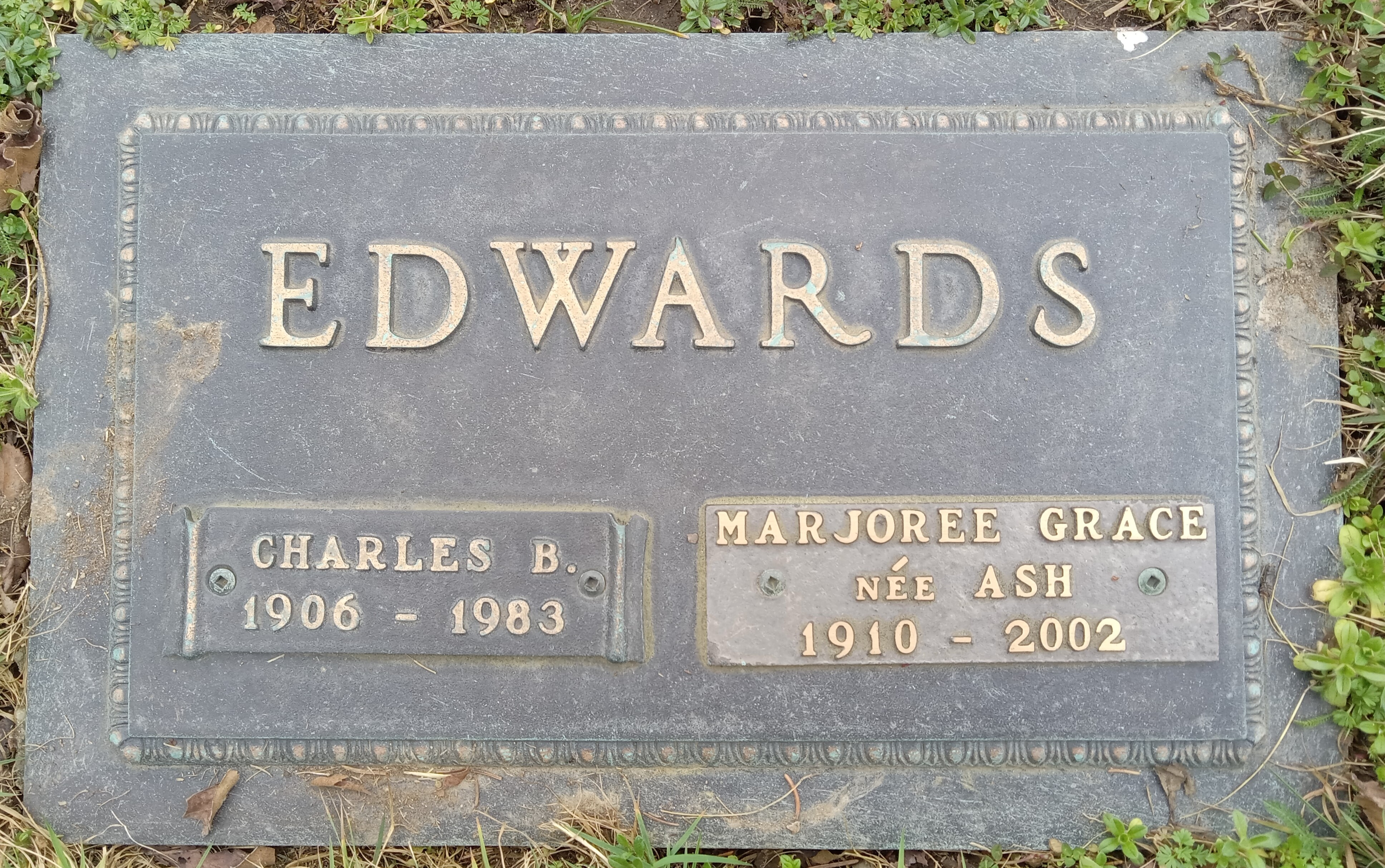
Edwards's grave marker

While working for the Canadian National Railway in Jasper, Edwards met his future wife, Marjoree Ash from Vancouver. Wedding plans were delayed when Edwards lost his job, but revived once he relocated to Vancouver. When the finals of the 1933 Canadian Championships of tennis were delayed one day due to rain, they married on the Sunday morning before he reported on the finals. He borrowed $25 from an editor in Vancouver to cover wedding expenses, and his bride's train fare to Calgary where they honeymooned in advance of his next assignment.

Edwards and his wife had two sons. He was a member of Yorkminster United Church in Toronto, and helped organize construction of the building in 1957. He enjoyed playing cribbage and took a game board with him when he travelled. He died from a stroke in Delta, British Columbia, on June 23, 1983, then was cremated and interred at Forest Lawn Memorial Park in Burnaby.

== Honours and reputation ==
Fellow broadcasters and journalists knew Edwards as "Uncle Charlie". The Province described him as "one of the most influential figures in broadcast journalism in Canada". BN president Bob Lockhart felt that, "Edwards's high standards of executive ability were matched only by his friendship for the working newsman", and referred to him as "one of the giants of broadcast journalism". CP president I. Norman Smith credited Edwards for moulding BN "in the face of opposition from some broadcasters and some newspaperman", into a $2-million-per-year business.

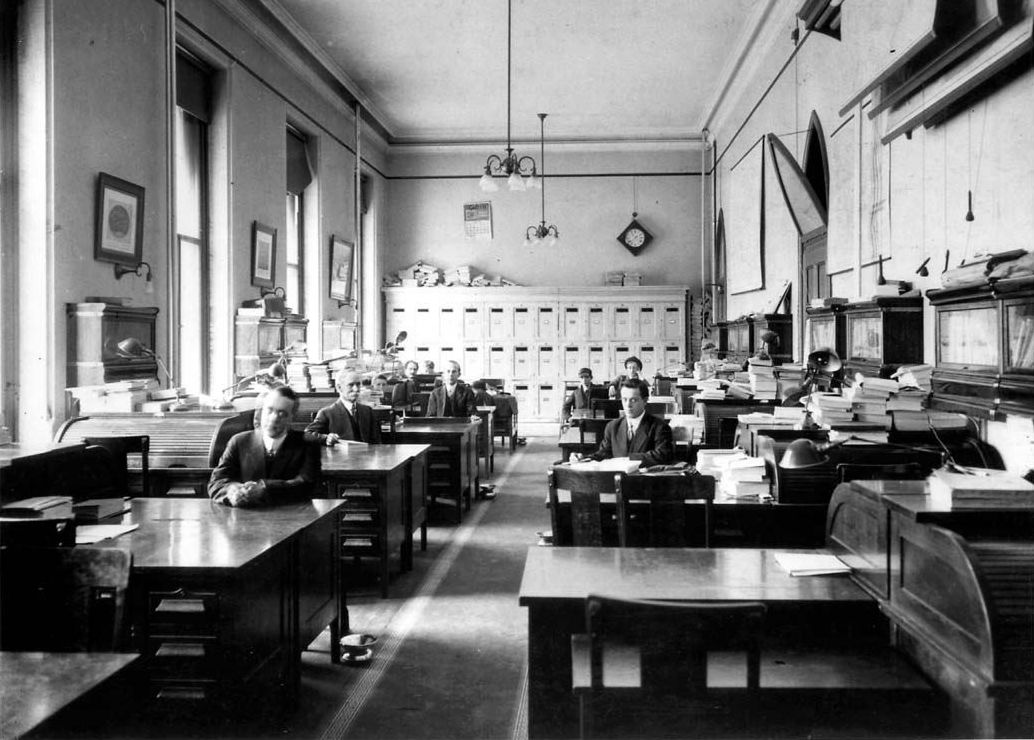
Canadian Parliamentary Press Gallery

"When Broadcast News was started in 1954, everybody said it wouldn't work—but Charlie made it work. His industry, his integrity, in fact his stubbornness put it over. To Charlie belongs the credit for uniting two groups who at the time were adversaries, and when the situation looked hopeless."

— H. Gordon Love, BN president, 1971

Edwards was made an honorary life member of the RTNDA, the Canadian Association of Broadcasters (CAB), and the Western Association of Broadcasters. In 1967, the RTNDA renamed its annual award for spot news reporting to the Charlie Edwards Award. The CAB gave him a citation in 1968, for his work in broadcast news quality and professional standards among newsmen. In 1970, he was named broadcaster-of-the-year by the Central Canada Broadcasters' Association.

When Edwards retired in 1971, he was recognized by the Canadian Parliamentary Press Gallery for "outstanding contribution" to the news broadcasting, and received the RTNDA International Distinguished Service Award for his leadership in strengthening freedoms of broadcast journalism. He was inducted into the Canadian News Hall of Fame during National Press Week in 1972, and was posthumously inducted into the CAB Hall of Fame in 1985.
