= Canadian News Hall of Fame =

Founded by the Toronto Press Club (now known as the Toronto Press and Media Club) in 1965, the Canadian News Hall of Fame honours more than 100 men and women who have made significant contributions to journalism in Canada.

Nominations for induction into the Hall of Fame can be submitted to the Press and Media Club at any time. The list of nominations is distributed to a group of Selectors across Canada, who then vote on the individuals and make their recommendations to the committee chairman. The Selectors are drawn from the ranks of senior Canadian journalists who are well qualified to judge their peers. Most are Members of the Hall of Fame.

Induction of new Members takes place annually at a banquet in downtown Toronto, where the honourees receive an engraved personal plaque. Their names are also added individually to the Hall of Fame plaques.

The Hall of Fame is operated under the auspices of the Toronto Press Club and was previously housed within the Ontario Club at 30 Wellington St. W. in Toronto. An important person who chose honourees was Gordon Donaldson (before his 2001 death), and his choices received some media attention.

== Selected Canadian News Hall of Fame inductees ==
- Arthur Ford (1966)
- Gérard Filion (1966)
- John W. Dafoe (1966)
- Claude Ryan (1968)
- Gillis Purcell (1970)
- Charles B. Edwards (1972)
- Stu Keate (1974)
- Jim Coleman (1980)
- Charles Lynch (1981)
- Pierre Berton (1983)
- Betty Kennedy (1983)
- June Callwood (1984)
- Terry Mosher (1985)
- J. Douglas MacFarlane (1985)
- Richard Doyle (1990)
- Clyde Gilmour (1990)
- Austin Carroll (1991)
- Peter Gzowski (1991)
- William Lyon Mackenzie (1991)
- Peter C. Newman (1992)
- Robert La Palme (1995)
- Joe Schlesinger (1995)
- Gwyn "Jocko" Thomas (1995)
- Conrad Black (1999)
- Allan Fotheringham (1999)
- Douglas Mason Fisher (2000)
- Tara Singh Hayer (2000)
- Lloyd Robertson (2012)
- Boris Spremo (2013)
- Christie Blatchford (2019)
- Robert Holiday (2018)

== See also ==
- List of editors-in-chief of the largest newspapers in Canada
