= Terry Mosher =

Canadian political cartoonist

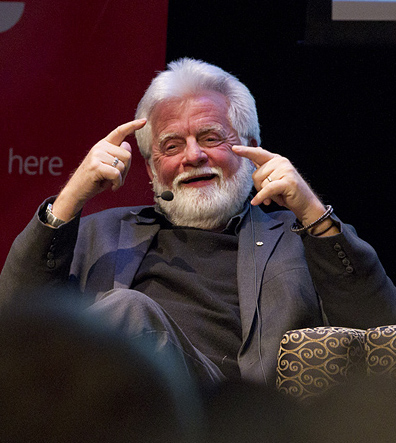
- Born: Christopher Terry Mosher; 11 November 1942 (age 84) Ottawa, Ontario
- Areas: Author; Cartoonist; Humanitarian
- Pseudonym: Aislin
- Awards: National Newspaper Awards (2); Canadian News Hall of Fame; Order of Canada

Christopher Terry Mosher, OC (born 11 November 1942) is a Canadian political cartoonist for the Montreal Gazette. He draws under the name Aislin, a rendition of the name of his eldest daughter Aislinn (without the second 'n'). Aislin's drawings have also appeared in numerous international publications, such as Punch, The Atlantic Monthly, Harper's, National Lampoon, Time, The Washington Star, The New York Times and the Canadian edition of The Reader's Digest. According to his self-published website, as of 2020, he is the author of 51 books.

== Life and career ==
Born in Ottawa, Ontario, Mosher attended fourteen different schools in Montreal, Toronto and Quebec City, graduating from the École des Beaux-arts in 1967. He famously won entrance to this fine arts college (now part of UQAM) by forging his high-school graduation certificate, which he called his most successful work. During his summers as a student, Mosher started drawing cartoons, "portraits of American tourists" on the cobbled stone streets of Quebec City. After graduating with a Bachelors of Arts degree, rather than paint, Mosher decided to continue to draw and become a political cartoonist. He has admitted that he knew little about his chosen trade, and the lack of historical books about Canadian political cartooning made the transition a challenge. However, he adapted quickly, and in 1969, he was appointed official cartoonist of The Montreal Star, one of two Montreal English-language newspapers. He moved to the Montreal Gazette in 1972.

Mosher began his career during a period of political change in Canadian and Quebec history. In 1967, Prime Minister Lester B. Pearson stepped down as leader of the Liberal Party of Canada, and Pierre Elliott Trudeau assumed its leadership, becoming the 15th Prime Minister of Canada. In the fall of 1970, Montreal found itself in the middle of what is known as the October Crisis, in which the pro-sovereigntist group Front de libération du Québec (FLQ) kidnapped and killed Pierre Laporte, a senior Quebec cabinet minister. The Federal Government, led by Pierre Trudeau, invoked the War Measures Act, thereby suspending civil rights and liberties. In 1976, the Parti Québécois, a sovereigntist party, was elected for the first time in Quebec history. These events gave Mosher "a phenomenal, sort of varied experience, to be drawing material on all of these different matters".

Mosher published his first ever cartoon in September 1967, a drawing of Charles de Gaulle in the Saturday Night magazine. His first cartoon published in a newspaper (The Montreal Star) was on 10 December 1967. It was about a police raid of an African entertainment group that had been rumoured to have gone topless. Since December 1967, he has published over 13,000 editorial cartoons.

A cartoon that Mosher himself describes as "probably the best remembered of any cartoon I’ve drawn" is one depicting the newly elected Premier of Quebec, René Lévesque, holding his customary cigarette, saying, “ O.K. Everybody Take a Valium!” reflecting the Anglophone community's angst towards their future in the province. The cartoon was drawn on the night when the pro-sovereigntist Parti Québecois won the 1976 election.

Mosher's cartoons have evolved over time and, with the evolution of the internet, he has been concentrating on the appearance of drawings in the virtual format rather than print: "I draw cartoons now, not how it will look in the newspaper, but how it will look on the screen".

Mosher has partnerships not only with newspapers but with a board game and bookstore as well. Mosher famously turned down shares in the board game Trivial Pursuit for which he provided the original artwork. The co-inventor, Chris Haney, gave Mosher a choice: $1,000 or shares. Mosher took the cash. He also provided a cartoon for the logo of a Montreal bookstore, Paragraphe Bookstore.

Mosher and fellow Montreal cartoonist Serge Chapleau were the subject of a 2003 documentary film, Nothing Sacred, directed by Garry Beitel.

== Exhibitions ==
In 1997, Mosher's work was presented in the McCord Museum of Montreal alongside fellow cartoonist Serge Chapleau's work.The Cartoon Calamities! a 2012 exhibition covering 150 years of current events through the drawings of Quebec cartoonists including Aislin.

In 2017, the McCord Museum presented another exhibition, Aislin: 50 Years of Cartoons, celebrating 50 of Mosher's best political cartoons spanning 50 years from 1967 to 2017. The exhibition was not only a showcase of his work, but also an introduction to Montreal, Quebec, and Canadian political history. The exhibition was divided into five main themes: A Changing Society, which showcased a Leonard Cohen cartoon; Quebec and Canadian Politics, which concentrated on political events such as the election of the Parti Québecois, and the Quebec referendums on sovereignty; Montreal Mayors, focusing on Jean Drapeau and 1976 Montreal Olympics; First Ministers, detailing political leaders such as Pierre Trudeau, Réné Levesque, Brian Mulroney and Justin Trudeau; and finally, Montreal Life, showcasing cartoons reflecting Montreal's joie de vivre.

In late 2017, Mosher had another exhibition at the Ottawa City Hall Art Gallery where his cartoons were presented. The exhibition was titled Terry Mosher- From Trudeau to Trudeau: Fifty Years of Aislin Cartoons.

== Personal life and philanthropy ==
Mosher has two daughters, Aislinn and Jessica, who are both McGill University graduates.

Mosher's love for baseball led him to be part of the Baseball Writers' Association of America.

Mosher has had a long association with the Old Brewery Mission, Montreal's largest shelter for the homeless, and in 2001, was appointed to the institution's board of directors.

== Honours and awards ==
Mosher is the recipient of two National Newspaper Awards and five individual prizes from the international Salon of Caricature. He was awarded President Emeritus by the Association of Canadian Cartoonists. In 1985, Mosher became the youngest person ever to be inducted into the Canadian News Hall of Fame. In 2002, he was made an Officer of the Order of Canada. In 2007, he was awarded an honorary Doctor of Letters from McGill University. In 2012, he was inducted into the Canadian Cartoonist's Hall of Fame (aka The Giants of the North) in a ceremony in Toronto as part of the 8th Annual Doug Wright Awards for Canadian Cartooning. He received the Canadian Version of the Queen Elizabeth II Golden Jubilee Medal in 2002. and the Canadian Version of the Queen Elizabeth II Diamond Jubilee Medal in 2012.

In June 2018, Mosher was awarded an honorary doctorate from Concordia University.

== Controversy ==
In 1993, MP Robert Layton denounced Aislin's cartoon depicting outgoing Prime Minister Brian Mulroney lying face down in the snow after having been tripped by a whistling Pierre Trudeau as "a crime against fundamental Canadian values of decency and mutual respect", making him the first political cartoonist censured in the House of Commons.

On 12 March 2010, Mosher drew a cartoon depicting a woman in a niqab with prison bars and a lock in place of her eyes. The cartoon was drawn in reference to a Montreal Muslim woman who refused to remove her niqab upon entering a French-language school and was asked to leave. Salem Elmenyawi, the president of the Muslim Council of Montreal, pointed out that he had made similar cartoons about women wearing a hijab. Elmenyawi explained that the cartoon creates an inaccurate depiction of women who wear niqabs by "not respecting the fact they tried to be true to the faith the way they understood it and the way they think it's right." Mosher defended his cartoon indicating that it is necessary to have more than just one view represented.

On 8 April 2020, Mosher posted a cartoon of Donald Trump with a swastika as his coat of arms. As a result of the extreme backlash towards the cartoon, the Montreal Gazette published a modified version of the cartoon without the swastika included in the emblem.
