= Chrétien: The Will to Win =

1995 book by Lawrence Martin

- Author: Lawrence Martin
- Language: English
- Subject: Jean Chrétien, Prime Minister of Canada
- Genre: Biography
- Publisher: Lester Publishing
- Publication date: 1995
- Publication place: Canada
- ISBN: 1-895555-95-7
- Followed by: Iron Man: The Defiant Reign of Jean Chrétien

Chrétien: The Will to Win is the first volume of Lawrence Martin's two-part biography of Jean Chrétien. It details Chrétien's early life and career, before becoming a politician. Martin examines some of the characteristics of the young Jean Chrétien and how they impacted him as a Prime Minister.

== See also ==
- List of books about prime ministers of Canada
