= Gordon Donaldson (journalist) =

Scottish-Canadian author and journalist

- Born: 18 August 1926; Glasgow, Scotland
- Died: 2001 (aged 74–75); Toronto, Ontario
- Occupations: Journalist, historian, author
- Writing career
- Genre: Non-fiction

Archibald Gordon Clark Donaldson (18 August 1926 – June 2001) was a Scottish-Canadian author and journalist. He appeared on television and also produced television programming.

== Early life ==
Donaldson was born in Glasgow. He went to school until he was 16 and then worked for the Ardrossan and Saltcoats Herald. In 1944 he joined the British Army. Donaldson explained his ambitions by saying, "I became a reporter at 16 and never wanted to be anything else, except a foreign correspondent."

== Career ==
The Prime Ministers of Canada.

During the close of World War II, Donaldson worked for the British Intelligence Corps. He did much reporting on anti-Semitism in Germany after the war. After immigrating to Canada with his wife Nina in 1954, Donaldson took up a job at the newspaper Toronto Telegram, and indeed one of his obituaries recalls him as having worked for the paper "during the wild circulation wars with the Toronto Star in the 1950s and 1960s." As part of that competition between the papers, in 1955, under the auspices of the Toronto Telegram Donaldson built the first fallout shelter in Canada and lived in it for two days while the Telegram published articles about it. Between 1963 and 1966 he was based in Washington, D.C. while working for the Toronto Telegram, and while in Texas the United States Secret Service restrained him for coming near U.S. President Lyndon B. Johnson. Donaldson began working for the Canadian Broadcasting Corporation in 1966. In his work for the CBC, Donaldson covered space exploration, including the visits to the Moon. Afterwards, he worked for CTV television and was featured on the television series W-FIVE.

As a television producer, Donaldson's credits included The Military Man (1970) on the Canadian Forces during the Pearson-Trudeau years. He also produced a documentary on Vladimir Lenin.

Donaldson's written works include histories such as Battle for a Continent. His biographies on the Prime Ministers of Canada, contained in a single volume, was published in 1969 under the title Fifteen Men. With continual updates starting in 1975, it eventually had to be renamed Sixteen Men and Eighteen Men. It was finally titled The Prime Ministers of Canada after Kim Campbell became Canada's first woman prime minister. As Donaldson said in his 1993 preface, "Twenty Persons didn't have the same ring to it."

One critic recommended The Prime Ministers of Canada for students, saying it was "straightforward and thoroughly enjoyable," and "accessible and helpful." Canadian humourist Will Ferguson, in his book Bastards & Boneheads, cited Donaldson's book on the prime ministers as one of the two "most rewarding" sources on prime ministers, along with Michael Bliss' Right Honourable Men. However, Ferguson gave some criticism, in that Donaldson allegedly used "the word 'squaw'" more than once, which was "somewhat disturbing."

In 1984, Donaldson became president of the Toronto Press Club and also worked for its News Hall of Fame. In the latter position in 1999, he added Conrad Black to the Hall of Fame, being quoted by the press as saying that Black "opened a new page in Canadian journalism history, when he launched a national daily newspaper [The National Post] to flourish from coast to coast." In 2001 the media also reported Donaldson's addition of Tara Singh Hayer to the Hall of Fame. Donaldson also wrote an autobiography. However, at the time of his death it was not published.
