= Patrick Brown (journalist) =

British-Canadian journalist

Patrick Brown is a British-Canadian journalist based in and living in Beijing, China. He has worked for both CBC News and Global News.

== Life and career ==
Brown was born in Birmingham, England. After his GCE joined VSO, Sierra Leone (West Africa) he attended Cambridge. He holds a master's degree in social anthropology from Downing College, Cambridge. He is fluent in French and Mandarin.

He moved to Canada in 1970. He was a computer systems analyst, teacher and freelance journalist before joining Radio Canada International as a news editor.

He went to Montreal to work as a reporter with CBC Radio in 1976 and as national reporter in 1978.

He is a co-author, along with Rae Murphy and Robert Chodos, of the 1976 book Winners, Losers, which covered the 1975–76 Progressive Conservative Party of Canada leadership campaign and convention.

Since 1980 Brown has been posted outside of Canada for both CBC Radio, CBC TV and briefly with Global News. He was a correspondent in London (1980–1990), Beijing (1990–1996, for CBC), Delhi (1997–1999) and Beijing (2011–2012, for Global).

Brown is now independent documentary-maker and files stories for the CBC based in China and Canada (Vancouver BC).

He published his memoir, Butterfly Mind, in 2009.

== Publications ==
- Winners, Losers. Toronto: Lorimer, 1976. with Robert Chodos and Rae Murphy. ISBN 978-0888621054.
- Butterfly Mind: : Revolution, Recovery, and One Reporter's Road to Understanding China. Toronto: House of Anansi, 2009. ISBN 978-0887848308.

== Awards ==
- Gemini Award for Best Reportage - 1993.
- Gemini Award for Best Coverage (Afghanistan) 1992.
- Gemini Award for Best Coverage (Afghanistan) 2002.
- Canadian Journalism Foundation Lifetime Achievement Award 2011.
