= Lawrence Martin (journalist) =

Canadian journalist and author

Lawrence Martin is a Canadian journalist and the author of ten books on politics and sport.

== BIography ==
Raised in Hamilton, Ontario, he received a Bachelor of Arts in political science McMaster University in 1969 and a Master of Public Administration from Harvard University in 1982.

Martin first reported for The Hamilton Spectator. At The Globe and Mail, he began as a sports reporter in 1974, served as Washington Correspondent for The Globe and Mail from 1978 to 1981, and served as the newspaper's bureau chief in Washington, D.C., Montreal, and Moscow, where he opened The Globe and Mail's first bureau in 1985 and reported on the Gorbachev years in power. He has been a columnist at The Globe and Mail since 2002. From 2017 to 2020, he was based in Washington, covering the Trump administration.

Martin was a national affairs columnist for Southam News from 1998 to 2001.

== Awards and nominations ==
- Lifetime Leadership Achievement Award – McMaster University
- Alumni Gallery Award – McMaster University (1993)
- Queen Elizabeth II Golden Jubilee Medal (2002)
- Shaughnessy Cohen Prize for Political Writing (nominated) (2010)
- National Newspaper Award – Columns (finalist) (2017)

== Bibliography ==
- The Presidents and the Prime Ministers: Washington and Ottawa Face to Face: The Myth of Bilateral Bliss, 1867–1982 (1982)
- One Man's Revolution / Breaking With History: The Gorbachev Revolution An Eyewitness Account (1989)
- The Red Machine: the Soviet Quest to Dominate Canada's Game (1990)
- From Behind the Red Line: An American Hockey Player in Russia (1992)
- Pledge of Allegiance: The Americanization of Canada in the Mulroney Years (1993)
- Chrétien: The Will to Win (1995)
- The Antagonist: Lucien Bouchard And The Politics Of Delusion (1997)
- Mario (2002)
- Iron Man: The Defiant Reign of Jean Chrétien (2003)
- Harperland: The Politics Of Control (2010)
