= Iron Man: The Defiant Reign of Jean Chrétien =

2003 book by Lawrence Martin

- Author: Lawrence Martin
- Language: English
- Subject: Jean Chrétien, Prime Minister of Canada
- Genre: Biography
- Publisher: Penguin Group (Canada)
- Publication date: 2003
- Publication place: Canada
- ISBN: 0-670-04310-9
- Preceded by: Jean Chrétien: The Will to Win

Iron Man: The Defiant Reign of Jean Chrétien is the second volume of Lawrence Martin's two-part biography of Jean Chrétien. It covers Chrétien's career as a politician and eventually, as Prime Minister of Canada.

== Summary ==
The biography begins with a preface on Chrétien's troubled childhood, and how it would lead to his rebellious instincts later. Martin paints Chrétien as a character with great disdain for aristocracy and authority in general; throughout Chrétien's career, he maintained such popularity because of his human flaws and his connection with the ordinary people. Chrétien is also depicted as an autocratic leader, not tolerant of criticism. According to Martin, this is because of the enormous odds Chrétien overcame in order to become prime minister, so he will not hardly relinquish power. Martin goes into depth about critical events in Chrétien's decade-long term as prime minister, including the 1995 Quebec referendum, the Shawinigate scandal, his power struggle with Paul Martin, and the Iraq War. All in all, Lawrence Martin's view of Chrétien is sympathetic, but not uncritical.

== See also ==
- List of books about prime ministers of Canada
