= Freedom Press Canada =

Freedom Press Canada is a Canadian book publishing company based in Toronto, Ontario. It promotes conservative authors and books based on "rights and freedoms, limited government and positive Canadian patriotism."

It has no affiliation with the United Kingdom-based Freedom Press, an anarchist publishing company.

== Authors ==
Freedom Press Canada has published 14 books by authors in fields such as Canadian and Ontario politics, autobiographies, business, and history. Those books include writings by Michael Coren, Barbara Kay, Brian Lilley, Larry O'Brien, and Gary McHale.
