= The Canadian Press =

Canadian news agency established in 1917

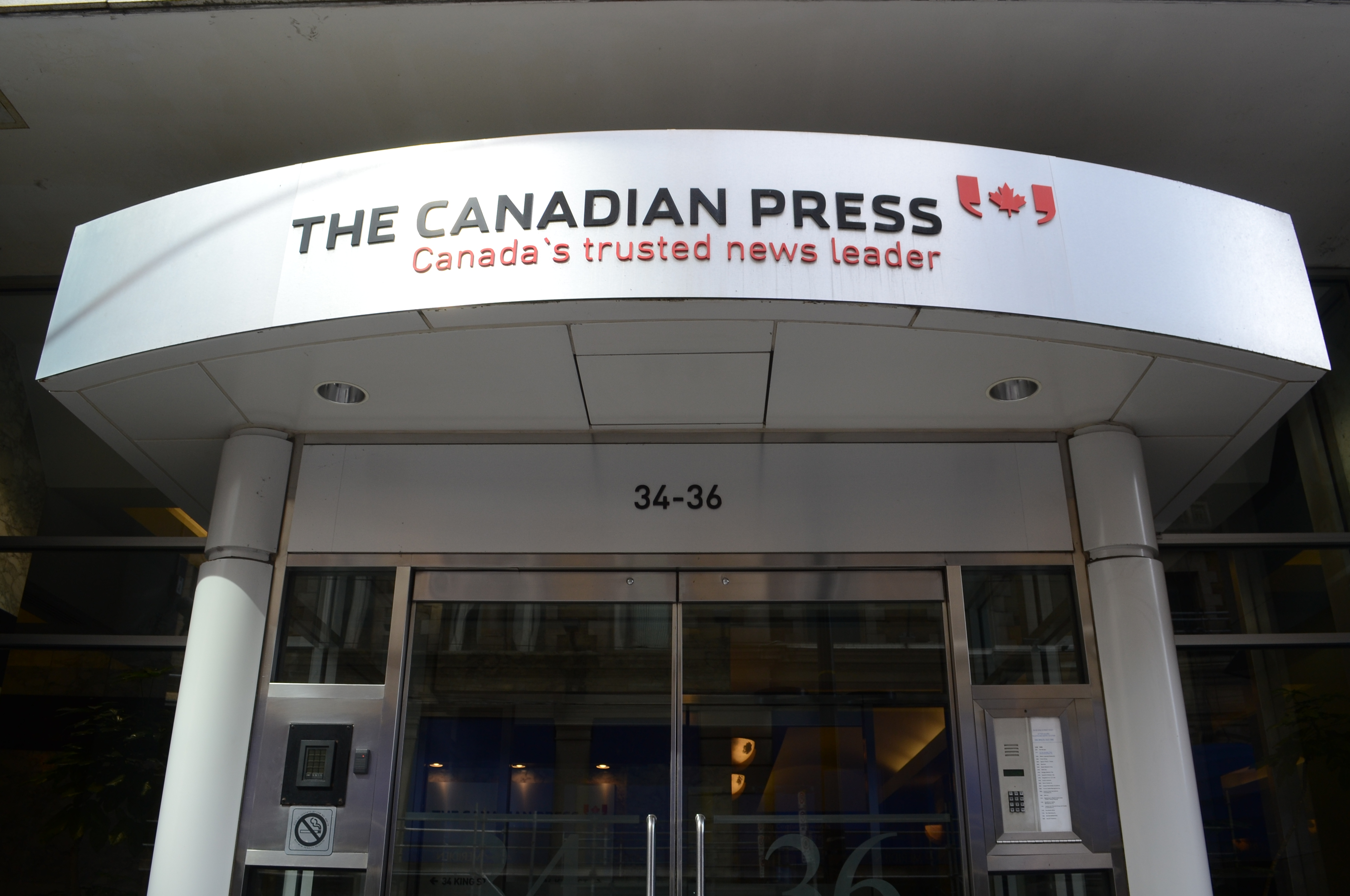
- The Canadian Press' former head office location on King Street
- Type: Private
- Industry: News agency
- Founded: 1917
- Headquarters: 60 Adelaide St E, Toronto, Ontario, Canada
- Key people: Andrea Baillie (Editor-in-Chief)
- Owners: The Globe and Mail; Square Victoria Communications Group; Torstar
- Number of employees: 180
- Website: www.thecanadianpress.com

The Canadian Press (CP; French: La Presse canadienne, PC) is a Canadian national news agency headquartered in Toronto, Ontario. Established in 1917 as a vehicle for Canadian newspapers to exchange news and information, The Canadian Press has been a private, not-for-profit cooperative owned and operated by its member newspapers for most of its history. In mid-2010, however, it announced plans to become a for-profit business owned by three media companies once certain conditions were met.

Over the years, The Canadian Press and its affiliates have adapted to reflect changes in the media industry, including technological changes and the growing demand for rapid news updates. It currently offers a wide variety of text, audio, photographic, video, and graphic content to websites, radio, television, and commercial clients in addition to newspapers and its longstanding ally, the Associated Press (AP), a global news service based in the United States.

== History ==
Initially, Canada had only regional news associations, lacking a national wire service. The Canadian Press was created by an act of Parliament as a news co-operative, with an annual government grant from 1917 to 1924, for the purpose of helping newspapers cover and distribute news across the country. Initially operating as a distribution network, its first editorial staff came on board during World War I to report on the efforts of Canadian soldiers overseas.

In 1940, the Canadian government suspended the broadcast licenses of British United Press and Transradio Press Service both of whom, unlike Canadian Press, sold commercial sponsorships for its news bulletins in violation of government policy. Transport minister C.D. Howe, who was responsible for broadcasting policy, announced that the two wire services must "show their news source is accurate" in order to retain their licenses. After complaints by Transradio that the move was an attempt by "selfish publishing and monopolistic interests … to destroy independent news services throughout the Dominion", the Canadian Broadcasting Corporation, which at the time was also responsible for regulating private radio broadcasters, agreed to reinstate Transradio's and BUP's licenses while also announcing a plan to enforce the ban on commercial news broadcasts by editing dispatches by the wire services before they were distributed to radio stations.

In 1941, CP created a subsidiary, Press News Limited with Sam. G. Ross as manager, to provide wire copy to radio stations to compete with American-owned Transradio Press Service and British United Press, the Canadian subsidiary of United Press. CP and then Press News sold news copy to the Canadian Broadcasting Corporation while TPS and BUP sold their copy exclusively to privately owned commercial broadcasters. In 1944, Press News served 35 of 90 radio stations in Canada, had a five-person staff in Toronto, and an annual budget of CA$90,000. In 1945, CP established a French-language radio news service, the first such wire service for French broadcasters in North America. CP Picture Service was established in 1948, to wire photographs to television stations and newspapers in Canada, instead of the images being mailed via the postal service. During the 1960s, the Canadian Press entered into an agreement with the Royal Canadian Mounted Police to transmit images and fingerprints of criminals on the law enforcement organization's behalf using existent wirephoto equipment. The Canadian Press operates in both English and French, the latter service being established in 1951 as La Presse Canadienne.

With the arrival of radio and television, The Canadian Press created Broadcast News (BN) in 1954, a subsidiary to deliver text specifically written for broadcasters. On January 1, 1954, BN replaced Press News. The venture operated in co-operation with private broadcasters, and supplied news reports to privately owned radio and television stations in Canada. Charles Edwards was named the first manager and secretary of BN. In 1956, BN established the first national voice news wire service for broadcasters in Canada, which became BN Voice in 1961, which then served 34 radio stations with national and international news. When Edwards retired in 1971, BN had grown to serve 298 radio and television stations in Canada, and increased to 45 staff and a $2-million budget. In 1979, CP added network newscasts for subscribing stations.

In 1985, Canadian Press purchased long-time rival British United Press, by then known as United Press Canada, from Sun Media.

The news agency has a staff of more than 180 journalists in its bureaus across Canada, as well as a correspondent in Washington, DC. It also operated a bureau in London, England, until 2004, has had reporters covering the Canadian mission in Afghanistan since 2002, and delivers news coverage to the West Indies. With its alliance through the Associated Press, there is now a worldwide exchange of news.

Canadian Press Enterprises Inc. is the entity that was to "take over the operations of the Canadian Press", according to a November 2010 article in the Toronto Star. The new board met for the first time on November 29, 2010, to review the operations of The Canadian Press. As of January 2020, Torstar, The Globe and Mail and Montreal's La Presse continued to be the owners of The Canadian Press.

== Operation ==
Playing an essential role in the development of Canadian identity, The Canadian Press is wholly dependent on leased telegraphic lines in order to send stories back and forth across the country to their vast number of readers.

In addition to providing news to newspapers, radio, and television, The Canadian Press provides online news and photos. Now, almost every daily newspaper in Canada relies on the service brought forth by The Canadian Press. It introduced this online breaking news service in 1996 and now its multimedia content is published by most major Canadian news websites. The Canadian Press launched breaking news video in 2007, with clips produced specifically for websites and wireless services.

On June 30, 2007, CanWest left The Canadian Press cooperative.

In September 2007, The Canadian Press launched a rebranding campaign in an effort to stay competitive, notably in the wake of the pullout by The CanWest Global's newspaper, television and online news outlets (see below). All of its services, including radio networks Broadcast News and Nouvelles télé-radio, were rolled into a single brand: The Canadian Press. The change marked the end of the familiar (CP) service logo.

The Canadian Press also operates the largest online editorial archive of news pictures shot by photojournalists. It was the first in Canada to develop this online archive in 1996 and now it is home to over two million digital images with hundreds of images added each day. These photos appear in newspapers, books and magazines, and online. In addition to news and information, The Canadian Press publishes the Stylebook and Caps and Spelling book, which are considered the chief style guides for Canadian journalists, public relations professionals, editors, and writers of all disciplines.

Through a longstanding partnership, The Canadian Press is the exclusive distributor of the Associated Press (AP) and Associated Press Television News (APTN) material in Canada. The AP is likewise the exclusive distributor of The Canadian Press in the United States and worldwide.

On March 11, 2009, Sun Media announced that it would also be pulling out of the cooperative.

In July 2010, a tentative deal was struck between The Canadian Press' three largest stakeholders, CTVglobemedia, Torstar, and Gesca, to transform the newswire from a co-operative into a for-profit entity. On November 26, 2010, Torstar, The Globe and Mail, and Square Victoria Communications Group announced they have invested in a new for-profit entity, Canadian Press Enterprises Inc., to take over the operations of The Canadian Press. The change in the ownership structure from a non-profit co-operative to a for-profit private business allowed the company to cover its pension needs and take advantage of future business opportunities, Phillip Crawley, publisher of The Globe and Mail, said in an interview, November 26, 2010. The Canadian Press had a serious pension shortfall, which was, in 2010, valued at $34.4 million.

== Notable staff ==
- Charles Tory Bruce, CP news editor and war correspondent, general superintendent from 1945 to 1963
- William Ashbury Buchanan, elected president of CP in 1944
- Charles Edwards, CP journalist from 1933 to 1944, manager of Press News from 1944 to 1954, manager of Broadcast News from 1954 to 1971
- Ross Munro, CP war correspondent during World War II
- Jean Pouliot, president of Broadcast News from 1971 to 1977
- Jack Sullivan, CP sports editor from 1948 to 1975

== See also ==
- Canadian Newsmaker of the Year
- Canadian Press Cable Service
- CNW Group
- Quoi de Neuf
- British United Press, CP's major competitor from the 1920s until the 1950s
