= Lester & Orpen Dennys =

Defunct Canadian book publishing company

- Status: Defunct
- Founded: 1973
- Successor: Key Porter Books
- Country of origin: Canada
- Publication types: Books

Lester & Orpen Dennys was a Canadian book publishing company based in Toronto, originally as Lester & Orpen. It operated as a publisher from 1973 to 1991.

Writers who published with the company included Graham Greene, P.D. James, June Callwood, Morley Torgov, P. K. Page, Anne Collins, John Irving, Don DeLillo, George Jonas, Modris Eksteins, Gabrielle Roy, Alberto Manguel, Joy Kogawa and Sandra Birdsell.

Lester & Orpen was established in 1973 by partners Malcolm Lester (27 August 1938 - 1 April 2022) and Eve Orpen, who died in 1978. It was renamed, reorganized, or succeeded as Lester & Orpen Dennys in 1979 by partners Malcolm Lester and Louise Dennys. It was sold to Pagurian Corp. in August 1988, and to Hees International in December 1988, with Lester and Dennys continuing as publishers.

Publishing operations were suspended by Hees in 1991, with L & OD continuing as a backlist operation only, as a part of Key Porter Books.

Malcolm Lester and Anna Porter of Key Porter established Lester Publishing, a new publishing company based in Toronto, announced 7 June 1991. The new company would hire many services from Key Porter Books. Its first catalogue was expected to be completed in July for Fall 1991. Kathy Lowinger, who had led the children's division at L&OD, continued in the same position at Lester Publ.

Lester Publishing issued new editions of some books published by L&OD, such as D-Day at 50 (1994; was 1984).

Louise Dennys subsequently joined the Canadian division of Alfred A. Knopf.
