= National Newspaper Awards =

Prizes awarded annually for the best work in Canadian newspapers

The National Newspaper Awards (French: Concours canadien de journalisme) are prizes awarded annually for the best work in Canadian newspapers.

== Synopsis ==
The awards were first given in 1949 by the Toronto Press Club, which ran the awards until 1989. They are now given by an independent board of governors and administered from the offices of the Canadian Newspaper Association in Toronto.

There are currently 21 award categories: Breaking News; Investigations; Presentation; Sports; Business; Politics; Long Feature Writing; Short Feature Writing; Columns; Editorial Writing; Arts and Entertainment; Editorial Cartooning; Project of the Year; Photo Essay/Portfolio; Spot News Photography; Sports Photography; Feature Photography; International Reporting; Explanatory Journalism; and Local Reporting (for newspapers under 30,000 circulation).

A Journalist of the Year is chosen from the winners (single or duo) by a panel of working journalists. The first Journalist of the Year was editorial cartoonist Bruce MacKinnon in 2015. In 2016, Joanna Slater was the winner. In 2017, Mark MacKinnon was awarded the prize.

As of 2020, the named awards were:

- Beat Reporting (E. Cora Hind Award)
- Editorials (Claude Ryan Award)
- International (Norman Webster Award)
- Investigations (George Brown Award)
- Long Feature (William Southam Award)
- Politics (John Wesley Dafoe Award)
- Short Feature (Bob Levin Award)
