= North Bohemia =

Czech republic region

Coordinates: 50.5000°N 13.5000°E

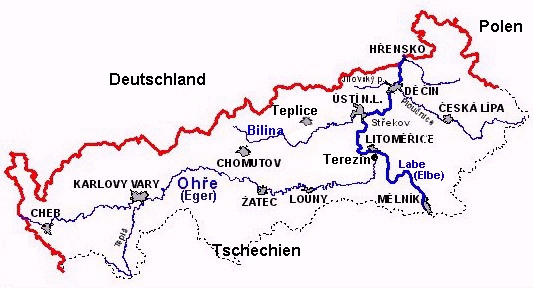
Towns and rivers of North Bohemia

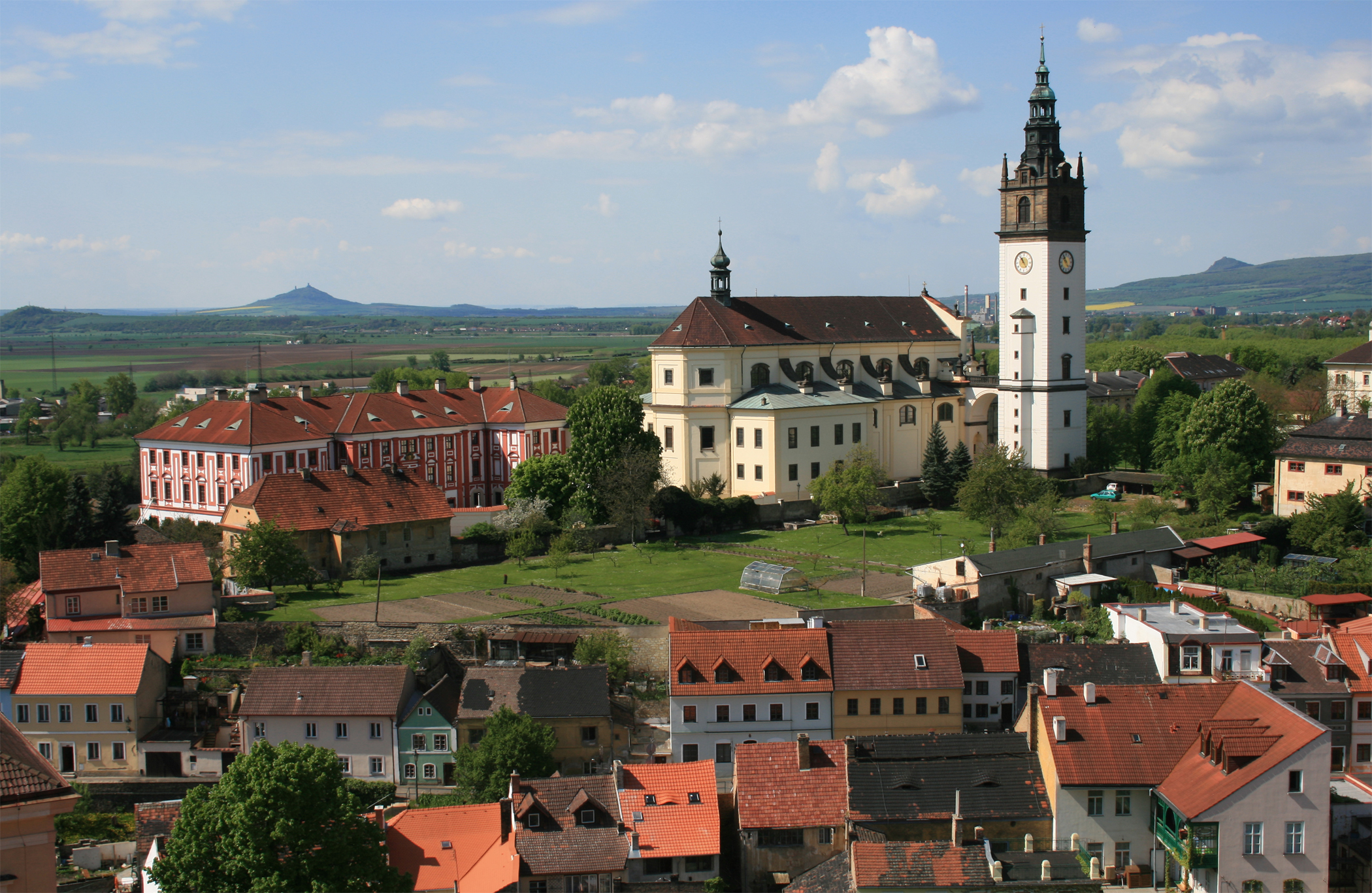
St. Stephan's Cathedral in Litoměřice with Hazmburk in the background

North Bohemia (Czech: Severní Čechy, German: Nordböhmen) is a region in the northwest of the Czech Republic.

== Location ==
North Bohemia roughly covers the present-day NUTS regional unit of CZ04 Severozápad and the western part of CZ05 Severovýchod. From an administrative perspective, North Bohemia is made up of the present day Ústí nad Labem Region, Karlovy Vary Region and Liberec Region.

In German language usage the term Nordböhmen (North Bohemia) often refers to that part of the Sudetenland once mainly populated by Germans in North Bohemia between Karlovy Vary (German Karlsbad) in the west and the Giant Mountains in the east.

== Geography and nature ==
North Bohemia is divided into many landscape areas including the Ore Mountains, the Bohemian Switzerland national park, Mácha’s Country, the Lusatian Mountains and Ještěd Ridge, Frýdlantsko and the Jizera Mountains. It is a popular tourist destination, much of which had been inaccessible until recently.

The Jizera and Lusatian Mountains are protected landscape areas. The summits of the Jizera Mountains climb to heights of about 1,000 metres above sea level, and the region’s peat bogs have been opened up with interconnecting educational trails. The national nature reserve of the Jizera Mountain Beechwood Forest (Jizerskohorské bučiny) contains the largest beech woodland in the Czech Republic, covering 27 square kilometres (10 sq mi).

Major cities and towns in North Bohemia include Česká Lípa, Děčín, Jablonec nad Nisou, Liberec, Litoměřice, Most, Ústí nad Labem, Chomutov, Žatec, Terezín, Louny, Karlovy Vary, Cheb, Kadaň, Duchcov and Teplice.

== Historic administrative unit ==
In the administrative system of the former Czechoslovakia, there was a North Bohemia province (Severočeský kraj) from 1960 to 1990 that consisted of the present-day Ústí nad Labem Region and parts of Liberec Region.

== See also ==
- Bohemia
- Central Bohemian Uplands
- North Bohemian Basin
