= Rudolf Bruner-Dvořák =

Czech photographer (1864–1921)

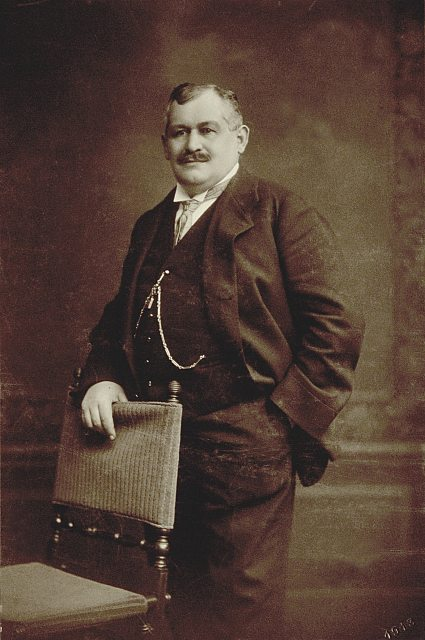
Rudolf Bruner-Dvořák

Rudolf Bruner-Dvořák (2 July 1864, Přelouč – 30 October 1921, Prague) was a Czech photographer of the late 19th and early 20th century. He was an important figure in Czech photojournalism and known for his use of Autochrome Lumière.

== Biography ==
Bruner-Dvořák studied under Karl Teufel, and was named the official photographer to Franz Ferdinand in 1891. He died in Prague.

== Gallery ==
Landslide in Klapý, 8 April 1898

Franz Ferdinand at military manoeuvres, June 1914

The toppled Marian column on Old Town Square, 3 November 1918

President Tomáš Masaryk arriving in Prague, 21 December 1918
