= Lkáň =

- Municipality
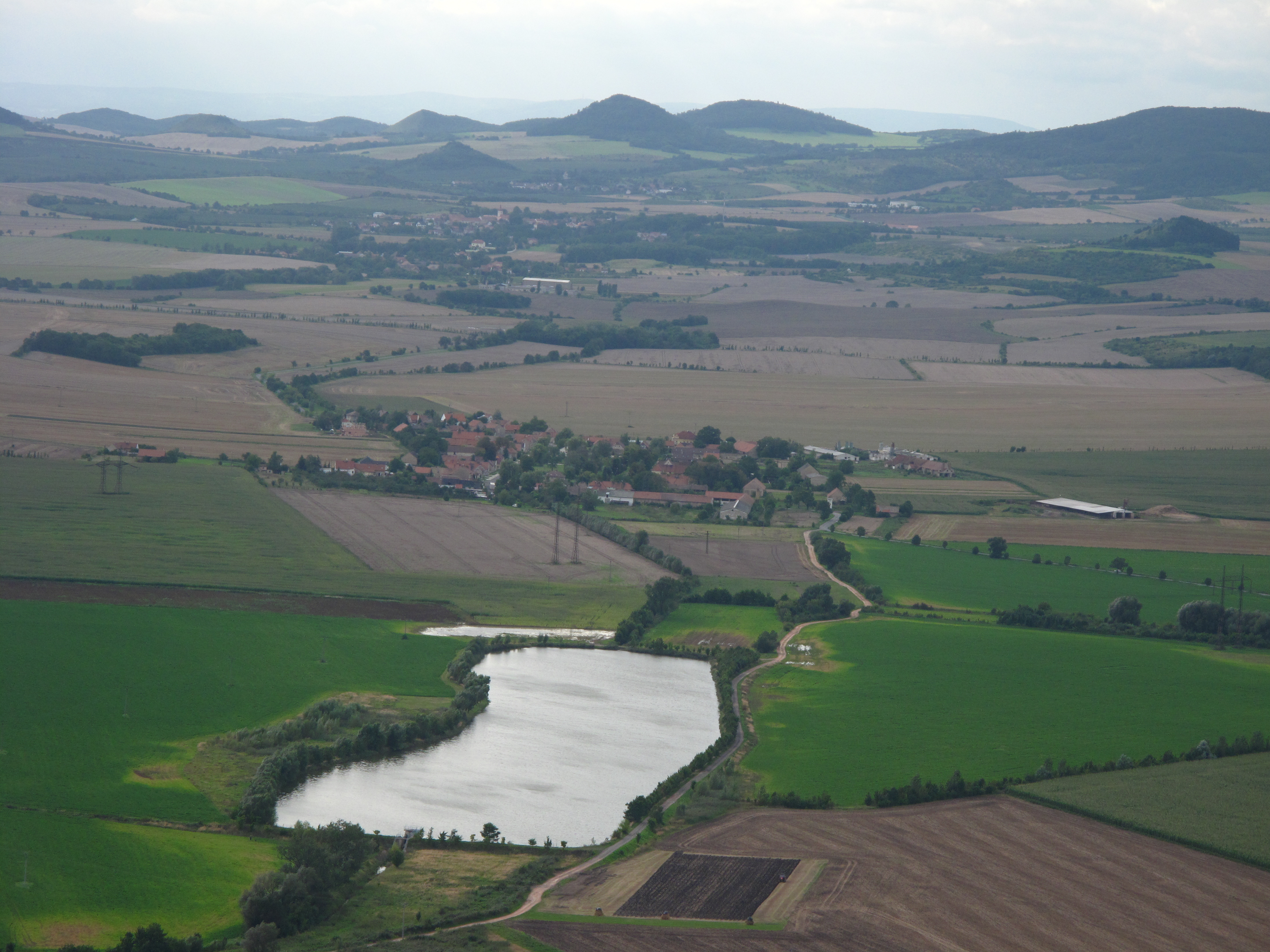
- Lkáň seen from the hill Hazmburk

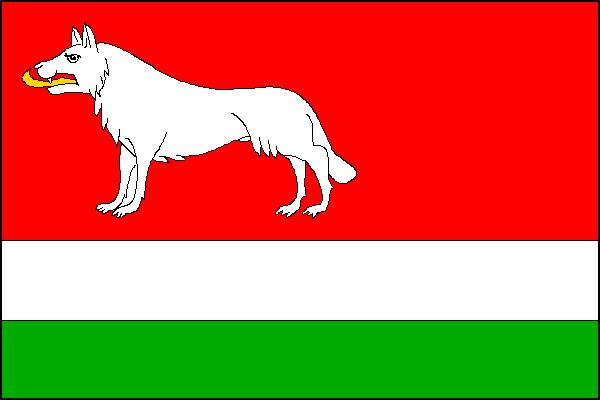
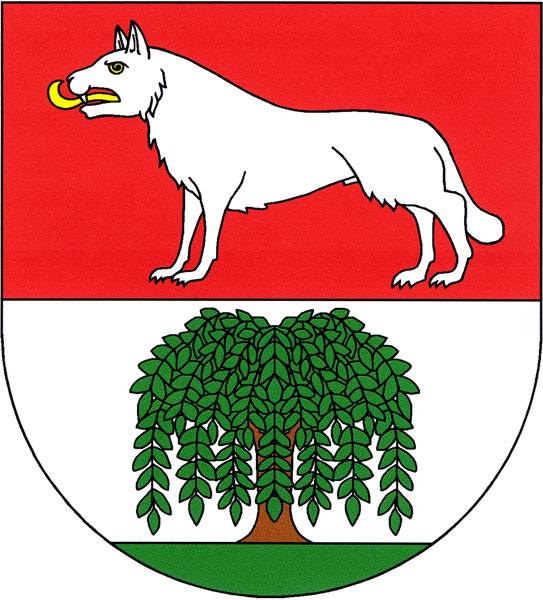
- Flag Coat of arms

- Location in the Czech Republic
- Coordinates: 50°26′35″N 13°58′11″E
- Country: Czech Republic
- Region: Ústí nad Labem
- District: Litoměřice
- First mentioned: 1237

Area
  - Total: 4.47 km^{2} (1.73 sq mi)
- Elevation: 209 m (686 ft)

Population (2026-01-01)
  - Total: 194
  - Density: 43.4/km^{2} (112/sq mi)
- Time zone: UTC+1 (CET)
  - Summer (DST): UTC+2 (CEST)
- Postal code: 411 15
- Website: www.lkan.cz

Lkáň is a municipality and village in Litoměřice District in the Ústí nad Labem Region of the Czech Republic. It has about 200 inhabitants.

== Etymology ==
The origin of the name Lkáň is uncertain. Either the name was originally German and was written as Elkan, or the original name of the village was Vlkáň and was derived from the Czech word vlk ('wolf').

== Geography ==
Lkáň is located about 15 kilometres (9 mi) southwest of Litoměřice and 25 km (16 mi) south of Ústí nad Labem. It lies in an undulating agricultural landscape in the Lower Ohře Table. The highest point is at 243 m (797 ft) above sea level. The Rosovka Stream flows through the municipality.

== History ==
The first written mention of Lkáň is from 1237, when King Wenceslaus I donated the village to the Teplá Abbey. Sometime in the 14th century, the village was acquired by the Zajíc of Hazmburk family and annexed to the Libochovice estate. Since then, Lkáň shared its owners, which included the Lobkowicz family (1558–1594), the royal chamber (1594–1604) and the Dietrichstein family (1676–1858). The village was heavily damaged by the Saxon army during the Thirty Years' War.

== Demographics ==
Historical population

Year	Pop.	±%
1869	309	—
1880	314	+1.6%
1890	308	−1.9%
1900	324	+5.2%
1910	343	+5.9%

Year	Pop.	±%
1921	342	−0.3%
1930	366	+7.0%
1950	278	−24.0%
1961	248	−10.8%
1970	218	−12.1%

Year	Pop.	±%
1980	191	−12.4%
1991	165	−13.6%
2001	152	−7.9%
2011	179	+17.8%
2021	187	+4.5%

Source: Censuses

== Transport ==
There are no railways or major roads passing through the municipality.

== Sights ==
The only protected cultural monument in the municipality is a niche chapel from the second half of the 18th century.
