= Cerro Mudugndoe =

Coordinates: 8°45′N 81°27′W

- King Buppan Peak
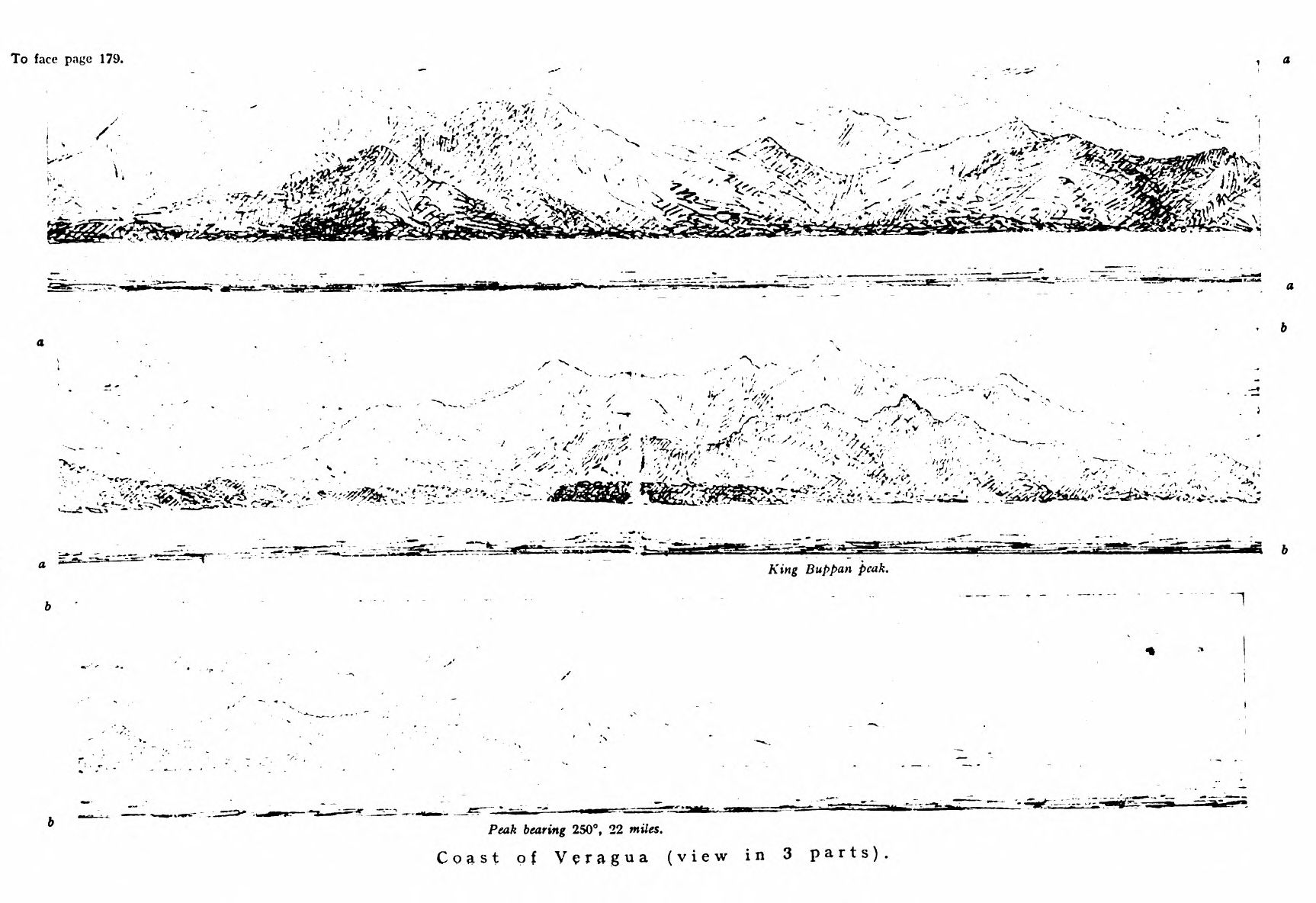
- View of Cerro Mudugndoe from the coast, sketch dated 1923.

Highest point
- Elevation: 758 m (2,487 ft)

Geography
- Location within Panama
- Country: Panama

Geology
- Mountain type: Conical

Cerro Mudugndoe is a prominent conical hill rising to about 2,487 feet (758 m), about 4 miles south from the coast or of Punta Quinbopan (King Buppan Bluff). Its southern flank descends in a gentle 2.5-mile slope before ascending abruptly to the summit, which forms a distinctive deep hollow notch against the much higher ridge immediately behind it—part of the loftiest section of the cordillera, reaching 7,140 feet (2,176 m) at roughly 15 miles inland from the coast. The alternate name King Buppan Peak derives from the Miskito people, with buppan (from bappan, the preterite of bapaia, "to anchor, to plant, to stand upright") yielding the meaning "where the king anchored", a reference to the tradition that the Miskito Kings frequently visited the site.
