= Conical hill =

Landform with a distinctly conical shape

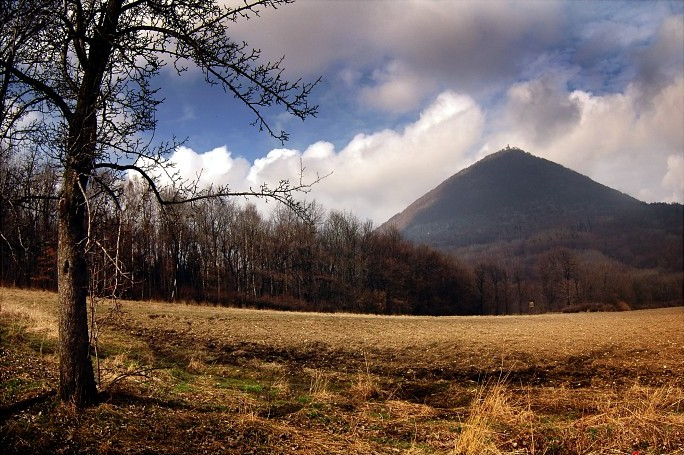
Milešovka Hill in the Bohemian Central Uplands

A conical hill (also cone or conical mountain or peak) is a landform with a distinctly conical shape. It is usually isolated or rises above other surrounding foothills, and is often of volcanic origin.

Conical hills or mountains occur in different shapes and are not necessarily geometrically-shaped cones; some are more tower-shaped or have an asymmetric curve on one side of the hill. Typically, however, they have a circular base and smooth sides with a gradient of up to 30°. Such conical mountains are found in all volcanically-formed areas of the world such as the Bohemian Central Uplands in the Czech Republic, the Rhön in Germany or the Massif Central in France.

== Term ==
The conical hill as a geomorphological term first appeared in the German language, as Kegelberg, coined by Goethe and geologists of his era. From their natural appearance these were mostly basaltic or phonolitic landforms in the shape of a mathematical cone, hence why the term came to be used in the early geological literature.
The first systematic geological mapping of the Kingdom of Saxony, proposed and started by Abraham Gottlob Werner, describes, in his later works, numerous mountains and hills of volcanic or subvolcanic origin as Kegel ("cone") or Kegelberg ("conical hill/mountain"). The term was introduced more definitively by Carl Friedrich Naumann in Notes to Section VII of the Geognostic Charter of the Kingdom of Saxony and its Adjacent Territories (Erläuterungen zu Section VII der geognostischen Charte des Königreiches Sachsen und der angränzenden Länderabtheilungen) thus: "The ordinary form of basalt and phonolitic hills is generally so wonderfully uniform that you can often recognize them even from a distance. They are cones. Of course, this typical form has many variations; the [normally] round base may be elongated, the peak may take the form of a rocky crest or ridge, ... but most forms can be reduced at least to a conical or a cone-segment shape. ... Flat ridges are then arranged in rows, out of which rise only a very isolated basalt or phonolite cones."

In this work, which was published by Naumann and later revised by Bernhard Cotta, the most important hills are described in the relevant map sheets, for example: 33. The Mittenberg, a conical hill in the centre between Tollenstein, Schönfeld and Neuhütte; rock, coarse splinters, with grey feldspar crystals.

Today the descriptors "cone", "conical hill" or "conical mountain" are mainly used as morphological terms in geography for a steep-sided, isolated hill or mountain, because they are not always seen or described in connexion with volcanic processes.

== Formation ==
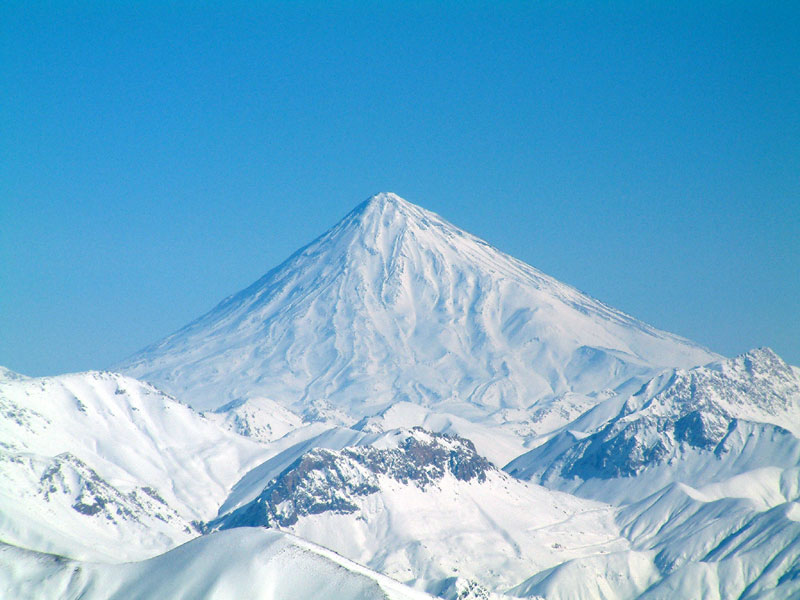
Mount Damavand, Iran

=== Volcanic cone ===
Mount Fuji, Japan

All stratovolcanoes and shield volcanoes have a tendency to form a cone at the surface. However, stratovolcanoes are able to form steeper sides whilst shield volcanoes only form very flat cones. The reason for this is that stratovolcanoes are composed largely of solid, eruptive material, whereas shield volcanoes are built up mainly by fluid lava flows.

Over the course of time, after several eruptions, a cone of debris forms from the eruptive material. The natural conical shape so formed is simply a result of the fact that the amount of ejected material decreases with the radially distance from the crater. The layer of debris deposited is greater near the volcano than further away, so the volcano grows more rapidly close to the crater itself. The slope gradient of the resulting volcano is dependent both on the angle of repose as well as the speed at which the volcano is weathered. The angle of repose is, in turn, dependent on the composition of the lava, its viscosity and rate of solidification, and also the amount of ejected loose rock. Many volcanoes tend to produce subsidiary craters or adventive cones. These are new openings formed on the sides of the volcano through which new material is ejected sometimes only on one side. As a result, these mountains lose their ideal conical shape. The formation of an almost perfect conical mountain or hill is only possible where there is a stable, central crater. Many volcanoes are therefore only conical from one direction of view; from other angles they appear to have an irregular shape or bulges.

=== Karst cones ===
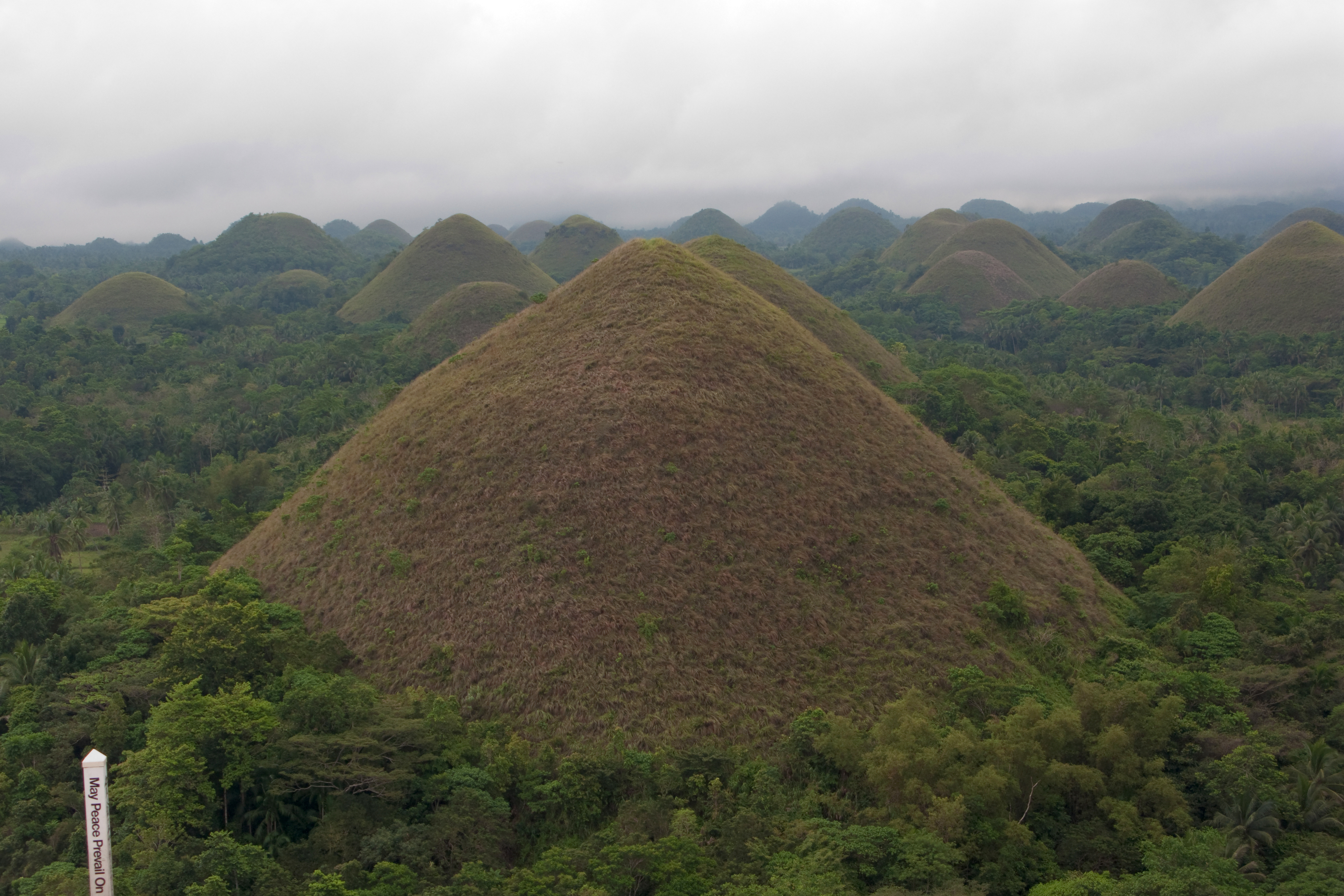
Chocolate Hills, Philippines

Conical hills may form in tropical karst regions, such terrain being known as kegelkarst. A typical example of non-volcanic conical hills are the Chocolate Hills in Bohol on the Philippines.

=== Erosion-formed cones ===
In almost all mountain regions of the world, conical peaks may be formed by erosion processes, but they are not usually isolated landforms. Often they arise through the formation of ordinary riverine meanders. But they can also result from the action of an entrenched river that has cut deeply into a plateau. The resulting cutoff meander spur may be cone-shaped. wind formed Conical hills are rarer, but still common. a well known wind formed Conical hill is Pinnacle Mountain in Arkansas..

=== Artificial cone hills ===
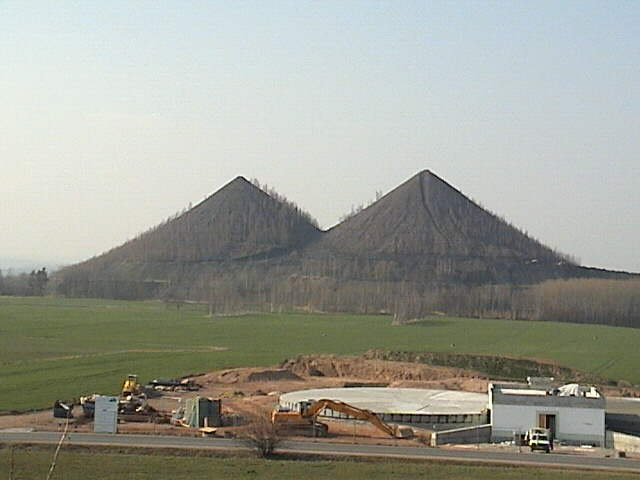
Former conical tips at the Wismut mining company works in Thuringia

The artificially created hills or mounds associated, for example, with mining also tend to be cone-shaped. These artificial hills are also free-standing and, once tipping has finished, they may become conical hills overgrown with vegetation. However, as artificial features they are classed as spoil tips rather than natural hills.

== See also ==
- Breast-shaped hill
- Geomorphology
- Inliers and outliers
- Spoil tip
- Table hill
- Volcanic cone

== Literature ==
- Carl Friedrich Naumann (ed.), Bernhard Cotta (revisor): Erläuterungen zu Section VII der geognostischen Charte des Königreiches Sachsen und der angränzenden Länderabtheilungen oder: Geognostische Skizze der gegenden zwischen Schandau, Zittau, Kratzau, Gabel, Böhmisch-Leipe, Wernstadtel und Tetschen. Dresden und Leipzig, (Arnoldische Buchhandlung) 1840
