= Přelouč =

- Town
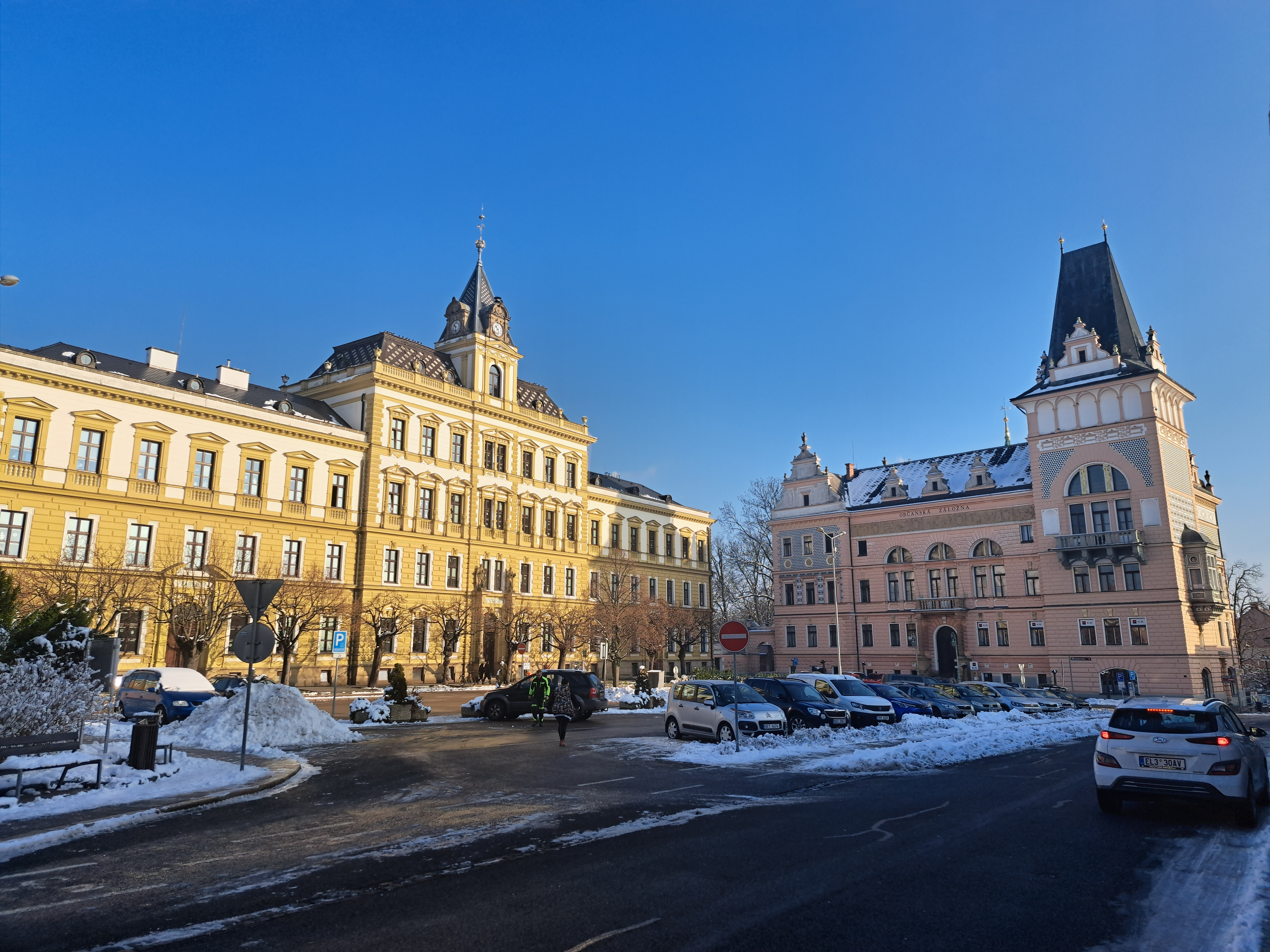
- Primary school and former Civil Savings Bank on the town square

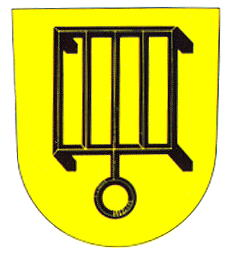
- Flag Coat of arms

- Location in the Czech Republic
- Coordinates: 50°2′24″N 15°33′37″E
- Country: Czech Republic
- Region: Pardubice
- District: Pardubice
- First mentioned: 1086

Government
  - Mayor: Martin Šmíd

Area
  - Total: 30.47 km^{2} (11.76 sq mi)
- Elevation: 212 m (696 ft)

Population (2026-01-01)
  - Total: 10,195
  - Density: 334.6/km^{2} (866.6/sq mi)
- Time zone: UTC+1 (CET)
  - Summer (DST): UTC+2 (CEST)
- Postal code: 535 01
- Website: www.mestoprelouc.cz

Přelouč (Czech pronunciation: [ˈpr̝̊ɛloutʃ]) is a town in Pardubice District in the Pardubice Region of the Czech Republic. It has about 10,000 inhabitants. The town is located on the left bank of the Elbe River, on the border between the Svitavy Uplands and East Elbe Table.

Přelouč was probably founded in the 10th century, making it one of the oldest settlements of the region. The main historical landmark of the town is the Church of Saint James the Great.

== Administrative division ==
Přelouč consists of eight municipal parts (in brackets population according to the 2021 census):

- Přelouč (8,160)
- Klenovka (184)
- Lhota (169)
- Lohenice (276)
- Mělice (190)
- Škudly (94)
- Štěpánov (133)
- Tupesy (70)

Tupesy forms an exclave of the municipal territory.

== Etymology ==
The name is derived from Czech phrase přes louku, i.e. 'across the meadow'. It refers to the place where people walked across the meadows.

== Geography ==
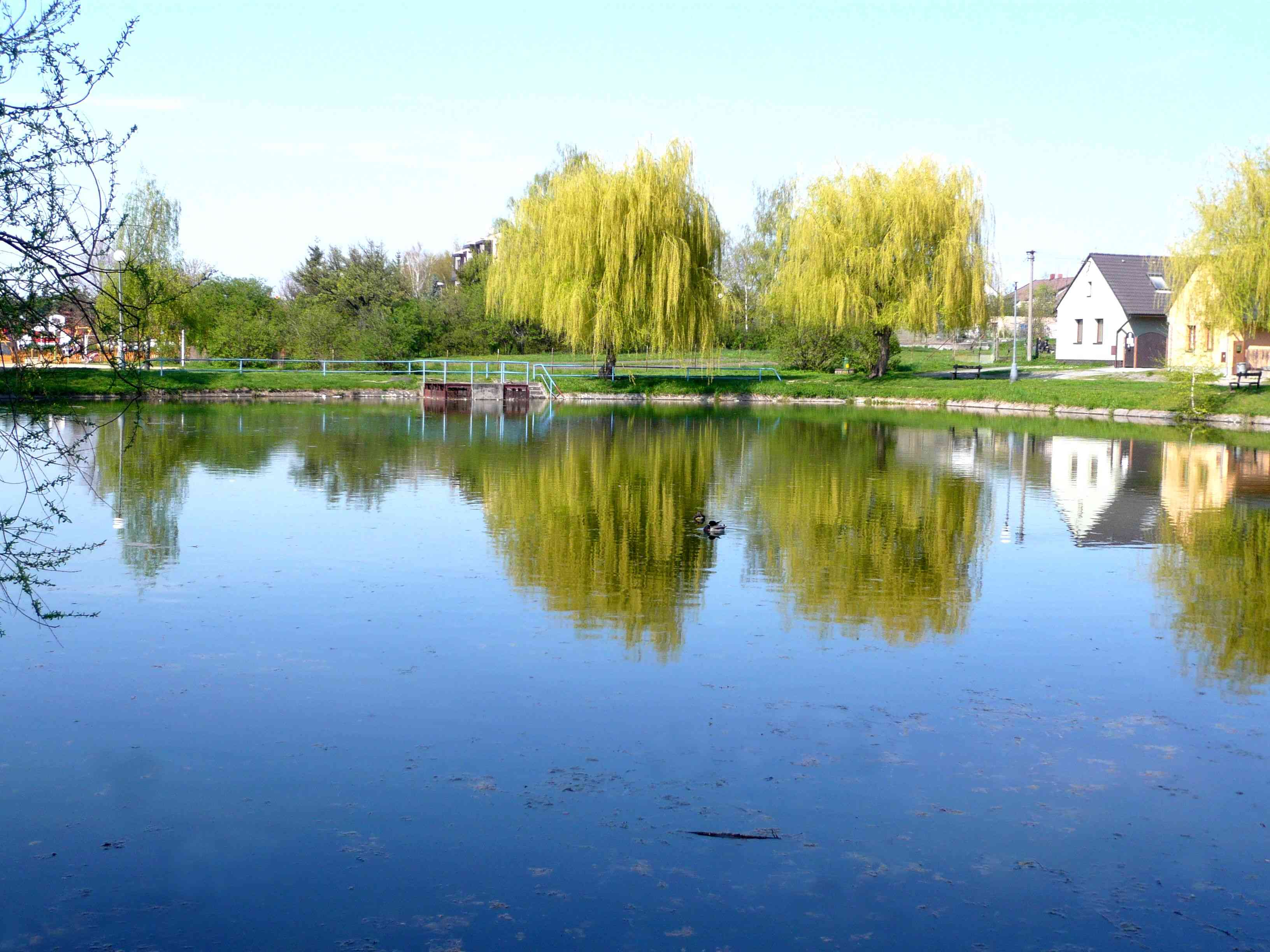
The fishpond Račanský rybník

Přelouč is located about 13 kilometres (8 mi) west of Pardubice. It lies on the border between the Svitavy Uplands and East Elbe Table, in the Polabí region. The highest point is at 294 m (965 ft) above sea level. The town is situated on the left bank of the Elbe.

There are several water bodies in the municipal territory. North of the town are flooded gravel quarries, which are used mainly for recreation and water sports. North of the town is also the fishpond Buňkov, the largest water body of Přelouč. Inside the urban area is the small fishpond Račanský rybník.

== History ==
Přelouč is one of the oldest historically documented settlements in the region. A settlement for probably founded here in the 10th century. The first written mention of Přelouč dates back to 1086 when the village became a part of the Benedictine monastery in Opatovice nad Labem. It was owned by the monastery for 300 years.

In 1261, Přelouč was promoted to a market town by King Ottokar II of Bohemia. Since then, the town has used its coat of arms which consists of a black gridiron in the golden field. This symbol is associated with Saint Lawrence who lived in the 3rd century in Rome and was burnt alive on a gridiron. Because of the town's affiliation with the Benedictine monastery dedicated to Saint Lawrence, the town coat of arms includes the gridiron.

Thanks to its location, Přelouč was an important strategic transit place in the 13th and 14th centuries. During the Hussite Wars, Přelouč was conquered and badly damaged. As a result, its importance declined and it became a small agricultural market town. In 1518, it was joined to the Pardubice estate. New economical and cultural development occurred in the second half of the 16th century and in 1580, it was promoted to a town by Rudolf II.

The War of the Austrian Succession again damaged the town, which again became a small agricultural town. It was not until the first half of the 19th century, thanks to the construction of a new imperial road and then the railway, that Přelouč became the second most economically important town in the region. From 1850 to 1960, Přelouč was a district town.

== Demographics ==
Historical population

Year	Pop.	±%
1869	4,161	—
1880	5,093	+22.4%
1890	5,359	+5.2%
1900	5,092	−5.0%
1910	5,496	+7.9%

Year	Pop.	±%
1921	5,154	−6.2%
1930	5,655	+9.7%
1950	5,644	−0.2%
1961	6,673	+18.2%
1970	7,452	+11.7%

Year	Pop.	±%
1980	8,865	+19.0%
1991	9,587	+8.1%
2001	9,144	−4.6%
2011	9,193	+0.5%
2021	9,276	+0.9%

Source: Censuses

== Economy ==
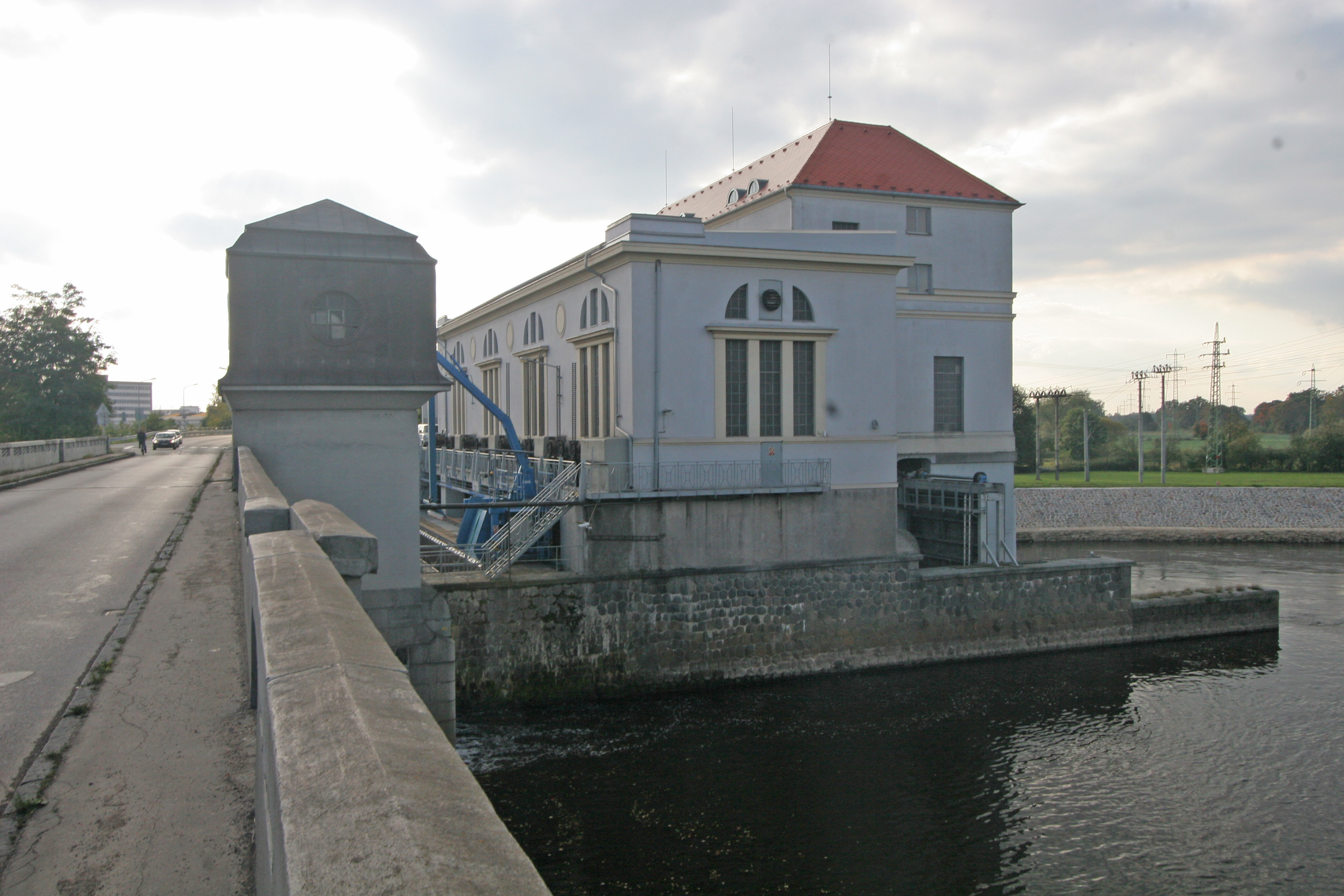
Hydroelectric power plant

The largest employer is the industrial company Kiekert-CS. The production plant of the multinational company was founded in Přelouč in 1993 and focuses on the production of closure systems for the automotive industry.

== Transport ==
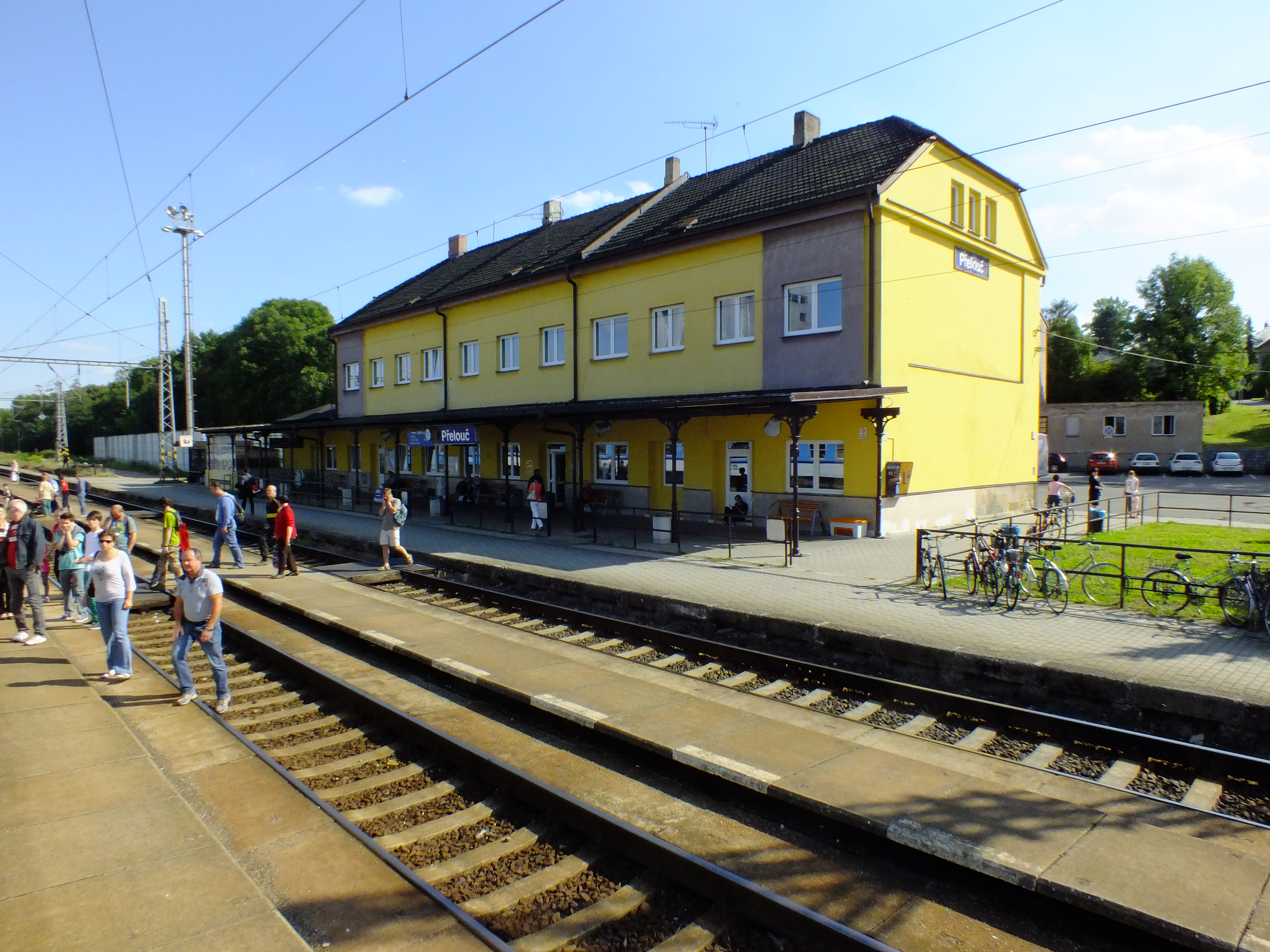
Train station

The I/2 road (the section from Pardubice to Kutná Hora) runs through the town.

Přelouč is located on the railway line Prague–Pardubice, further continuing to Brno and Luhačovice. It is also the terminus and starting point of the short local line from/to Heřmanův Městec.

== Culture ==
František Filipovský Award is a film and television dubbing ceremony award held in Přelouč since 1994. This ceremony aims to increase the prestige of this artistic discipline and to popularise artists who excel in this field. It commemorates the actor and voice actor František Filipovský, a local native.

== Sights ==
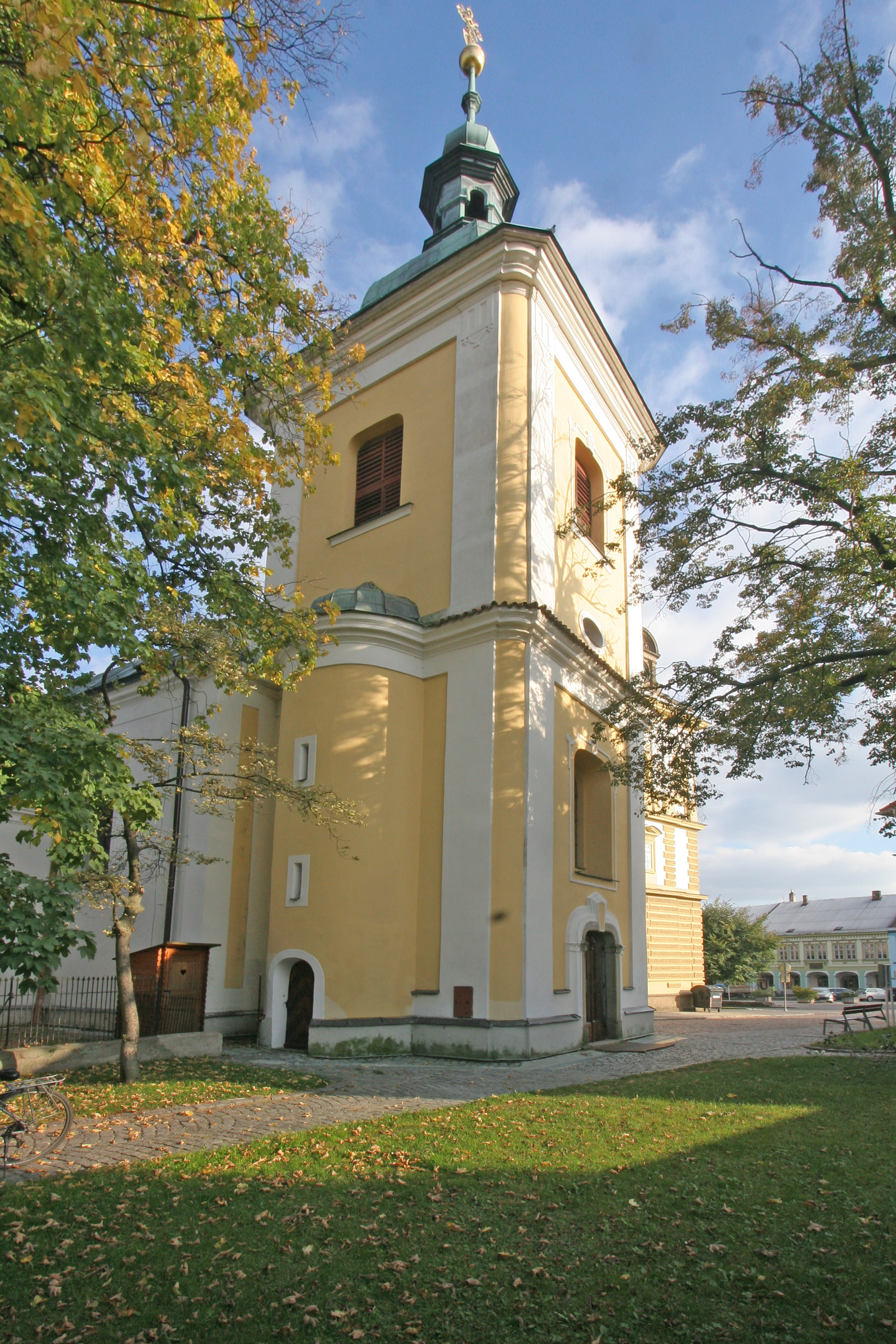
Church of Saint James the Great

The most significant building is the Church of Saint James the Great. It was originally built in the Romanesque style. After it was damaged by fire in 1641, it was renovated in the Baroque style in 1646.

A cultural landmark is the Church of the Visitation of the Virgin Mary. This cemetery church was built in the Baroque style in 1684. Its interior is decorated with paintings by Josef Kramolín.

The former Civil Savings Bank is a Neo-Renaissance building, built in 1899–1901. Te Neo-Renaissance building of the primary school was built in 1880–1881. They are among the main landmarks of the town square and the whole town.

The Hydroelectric Power Station on the Elbe has been working since 1924 and is a technical monument. It has an installed capacity of 2,340 kW.

== Notable people ==
- Ladislav Quis (1846–1913), poet and writer; lived here
- František Dvořák (1862–1927), painter
- Rudolf Bruner-Dvořák (1864–1921), photographer
- František Flos (1864–1961), writer
- František Filipovský (1907–1993), actor and voice actor
- Jiřina Petrovická (1923–2008), actress; raised here
- Stanislav Brebera (1925–2012), chemist, Semtex inventor
- Olga Hudlická (1926–2014), Czech-British physiologist
