= Lubor J. Zink =

Czech-Canadian journalist and anti-communist columnist (1920–2003)

- Born: Lubor Jan Arron Zink; September 20, 1920; Klapý, Czechoslovakia
- Died: November 6, 2003 (aged 83); Ottawa, Ontario, Canada
- Burial place: North Shore Memorial Park, Auckland, New Zealand
- Occupations: Journalist; columnist; author
- Political party: Progressive Conservative
- Spouse: Nicky Zora Zink (m. circa 1941)
- Children: 1
- Awards: National Newspaper Award; Medal of Merit, First Class; Gratias Agit Award

Lubor Jan Zink (September 20, 1920 – November 6, 2003) was a Czech-Canadian journalist, newspaper columnist and author known for his strongly anti-communist political commentary. After opposing the Nazi occupation of Czechoslovakia and serving with Czechoslovak forces during the Second World War, he fled the country following the Communist takeover in 1948. In Canada, he wrote for the Brandon Sun, Toronto Telegram and Toronto Sun, where his columns focused on communism, Canadian foreign policy and Prime Minister Pierre Trudeau.

== Early life and wartime service ==
Zink was born in Klapý, Czechoslovakia. He was studying economics in Prague when German forces occupied the country in March 1939. He joined the Czech underground and was forced to flee, travelling through Hungary before reaching Britain.

In 1940, Zink became chairman of the cultural section of the exiled Central Association of Czechoslovak Students. He later joined the Czechoslovak armed forces in exile, which fought alongside the British Army during the Second World War. He attained the rank of first lieutenant and received three commendations for bravery.

While in London, Zink made Czech-language broadcasts to occupied Czechoslovakia through the BBC Overseas Service. His wife later recalled that listeners regarded him as credible because he had remained in the country during the early period of German occupation and had firsthand knowledge of conditions there. His broadcasts resulted in members of his family being detained and sent to a concentration camp.

== Postwar career in Europe ==
Zink returned to Czechoslovakia after the war and joined the Czech-language service of Radio Prague, the international broadcasting service operated by the country's foreign ministry. His broadcasts provided Czechs abroad with uncensored information about developments in the country.

Following the Communist takeover in February 1948, his broadcasts were terminated. Zink went into hiding with his wife and their two-year-old son before the family escaped to England. His parents remained in Czechoslovakia and, according to his obituary, were pressured into silence. The experience reinforced Zink's opposition to communism.

Zink became a British subject in 1949 and returned to the BBC, working in its European service until 1951. He subsequently worked as a political and economic analyst for NATO until 1957.

== Career in Canada ==
Zink emigrated to Canada with his family in 1958 and became an editor at the Brandon Sun in Manitoba. His editorials received a National Newspaper Award in 1961. At the award ceremony, Toronto Telegram publisher John W. H. Bassett offered him a position writing an Ottawa-based column for the newspaper.

Zink became a Canadian citizen in 1963. After the Telegram ceased publication in 1971, he joined the newly established Toronto Sun as one of its original columnists.

A member of the Parliamentary Press Gallery, Zink wrote primarily about federal politics and international affairs. His columns were marked by opposition to Soviet communism, détente and Western politicians whom he considered insufficiently resistant to Soviet influence. He was especially critical of Prime Minister Pierre Trudeau and frequently criticized Trudeau's policies toward Cuba and the Soviet Union.

Zink's uncompromising views sometimes isolated him within the press gallery. His wife recalled that when he arrived in Ottawa, some journalists avoided speaking with him because they did not believe his accounts of life under communist rule. Former Toronto Sun editor Peter Worthington nevertheless described him as courageous and sincere, writing that few of his critics understood the depth of his knowledge of Eastern Europe or his experience of both Nazi and communist regimes.

In 1986, a column by Zink prompted an official diplomatic protest from the Soviet Union. Excerpts from the column had been included in a Russian-language press review broadcast by Radio Canada International. Soviet officials accused the piece of containing fabrications about Soviet history and foreign policy and said that Zink had made anti-Soviet rhetoric his professional credo. Canadian diplomats responded that the Canadian Broadcasting Corporation operated independently of the federal government and that Zink spoke only for himself.

His wife described him as a formidable debater but acknowledged that his certainty in his own views could make him inflexible and sometimes his own worst enemy.

Zink's columns were syndicated among newspapers in the Sun chain and were also published by The Christian Science Monitor in the United States.

Collections of his political columns were published as Trudeaucracy (1972), Viva Chairman Pierre (1977) and What Price Freedom? (1981).

Although critics sometimes portrayed Zink as an anachronistic Cold War polemicist or a writer preoccupied with a single issue, he maintained his anti-communist position through the Velvet Revolution, the collapse of communist rule in Eastern Europe and the dissolution of the Soviet Union. Worthington later observed that Zink had lived to see the fall of the system he had opposed throughout his career.

== Political candidacies ==
Zink was the Progressive Conservative candidate in Parkdale in the 1972 and 1974 federal elections. He was defeated on both occasions by Liberal cabinet minister Stanley Haidasz. Following his second defeat in 1974, Zink announced that he would not seek elected office again, attributing the result to the continuing popularity of Prime Minister Pierre Trudeau and saying that voters had "fallen for Trudeaumania once more."

1972 Canadian federal election: Parkdale
| Party | Candidate | Votes | % |
|---|---|---|---|
| Liberal | Stanley Haidasz | 12,214 | 43.8 |
| Progressive Conservative | Lubor J. Zink | 8,990 | 32.2 |
| New Democratic | Mike Gurstein | 6,478 | 23.2 |
| Independent | Dennis Deveau | 201 | 0.7 |
| Total valid votes | | 27,883 | 100.0 |

1974 Canadian federal election: Parkdale
| Party | Candidate | Votes | % |
|---|---|---|---|
| Liberal | Stanley Haidasz | 13,134 | 52.3 |
| Progressive Conservative | Lubor J. Zink | 7,133 | 28.4 |
| New Democratic | Evelyn Cotter | 4,479 | 17.8 |
| Independent | Terence Young | 144 | 0.6 |
| Communist | Neil McLellan | 132 | 0.5 |
| Marxist–Leninist | Gordon MacLean | 95 | 0.4 |
| Total valid votes | | 25,117 | 100.0 |

== Later writing and health ==
In addition to his political commentary, Zink wrote poetry and fiction. After a kidney transplant in 1988 ended approximately a year of dialysis, he wrote a column about the need for organ donors.

Zink discontinued his regular column in 1993 because of declining health, although he continued writing. At the time of his death, he was working on a book that his wife described as partly autobiographical.

== Honours ==
After the collapse of communist rule in Czechoslovakia, Zink received several honours from his homeland. In 1995, he was awarded the first class of the Medal of Merit.

In 1999, the Czech Ministry of Foreign Affairs presented him with the Gratias Agit Award for promoting the good name of the Czech Republic abroad.

He also received a special university medal in Prague in 2001 and was appointed an honorary colonel in the Czech Army.

== Personal life and death ==
Zink and his wife, Nicky (Zora) Zink (1918-2010), were married for 62 years. They had one son, Alec Guy Zink (1945-2008), who lived in New Zealand.

Zink died of cancer in Ottawa on November 6, 2003, at the age of 83. After his death, Niki Zink moved to New Zealand where her son's family lived. She died in Auckland, New Zealand, on June 28, 2010, at the age of 91. Their cremated remains are buried at North Shore Memorial Park in Auckland. She was predeceased by their son, Alec, who had died in 2008 at the age of 62.

== Published works ==
- Trudeaucracy (1972)
- Viva Chairman Pierre (1977)
- What Price Freedom? (1981)
