= The Brandon Sun =

Canadian daily newspaper

- Type: Daily newspaper
- Format: Broadsheet
- Owner: FP Canadian Newspapers
- Founder: Will White
- Managing editor: Matt Goerzen
- Staff writers: Drew May, Chelsea Kemp, Karen McKinley, Kyle Darbyson, Joseph Bernacki, Colin Slark, Perry Bergson, Thomas Friesen, Lucas Punkari
- Founded: January 19, 1882; 143 years ago
- Political alignment: Moderate
- Headquarters: 501 Rosser Ave., Brandon, Man., R7A 0K4
- City: Brandon
- Country: Canada
- Sister newspapers: Winnipeg Free Press
- ISSN: 0832-4212
- Website: www.brandonsun.com

The Brandon Sun is a Monday through Saturday newspaper printed in Brandon, Manitoba. It is the primary newspaper of record for western Manitoba and includes substantial political, crime, business and sports news. The Brandon Sun also publishes a weekly Westman This Week edition featuring local columns and events listings that is distributed free to the entire city.

It was founded by Will White, with the first edition being printed on January 19, 1882. After some time under a board of directors, J.B. Whitehead purchased the majority of shares in 1903, and took full control in 1911. He ran the paper until 1937 when his son Ernest C. Whitehead took it over. The Whitehead family controlled The Brandon Sun until 1987, when it was sold to Thomson Newspapers, who owned it until 2001.

The paper is currently owned by FP Canadian Newspapers, which also owns and operates the Winnipeg Free Press. Alumni of the Sun include Henry Champ, Haroon Siddiqui, Charles Gordon and Lubor J. Zink.

== See also ==
- List of newspapers in Canada
