= Ladislav Quis =

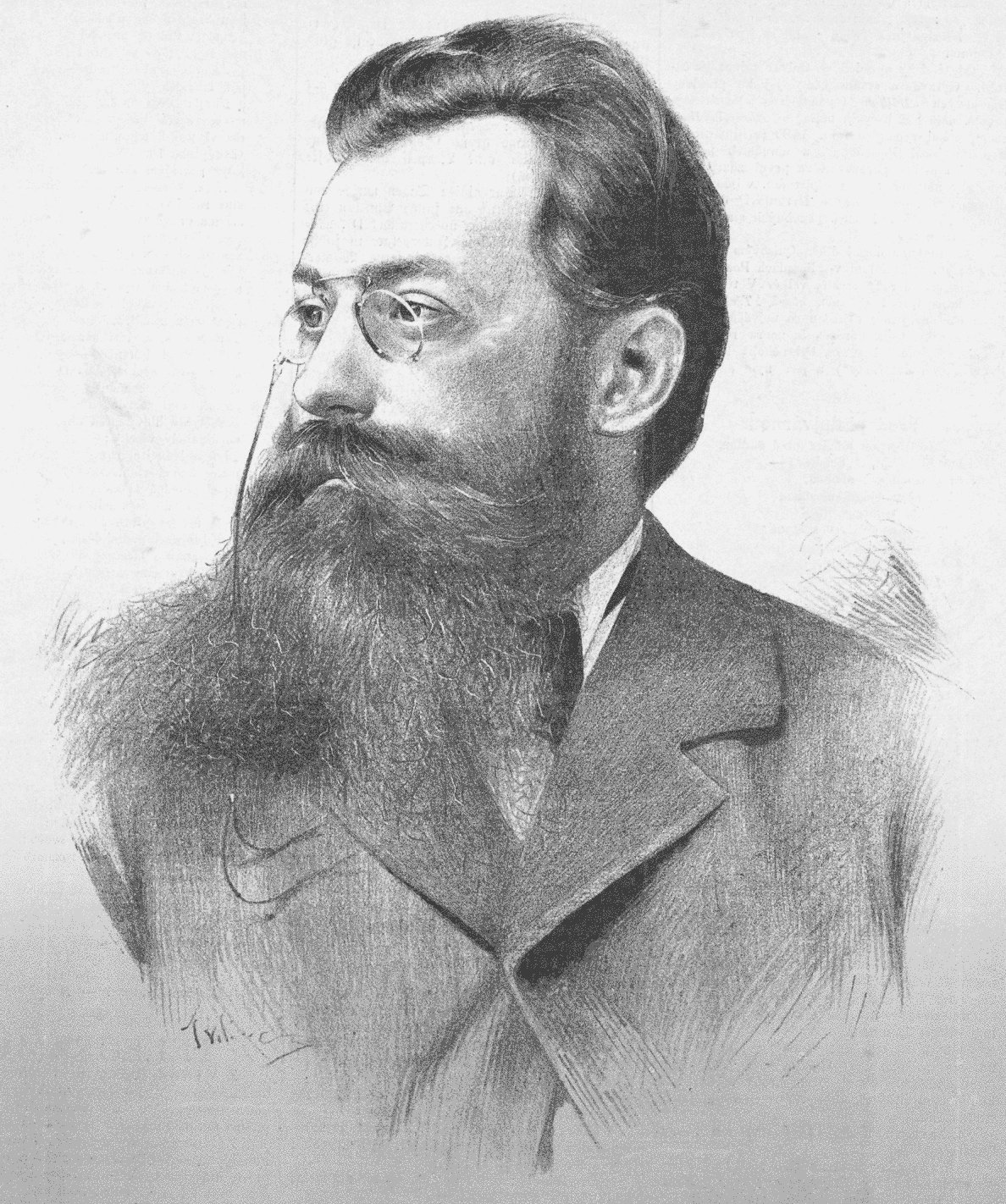
- Drawing of Quis by Jan Vilímek (1884)
- Born: 7 February 1846; Čáslav, Bohemia, Austrian Empire
- Died: 1 September 1913 (aged 67); Černošice, Bohemia, Austria-Hungary
- Education: Doctorate in Law, Charles University
- Occupation(s): Writer, poet, lawyer, journalist, translator, critic

Ladislav Quis (7 February 1846 – 1 September 1913) was a Czech writer, poet, lawyer, journalist, translator and critic. He was associated with the literary group Ruchovci.

== Biography ==
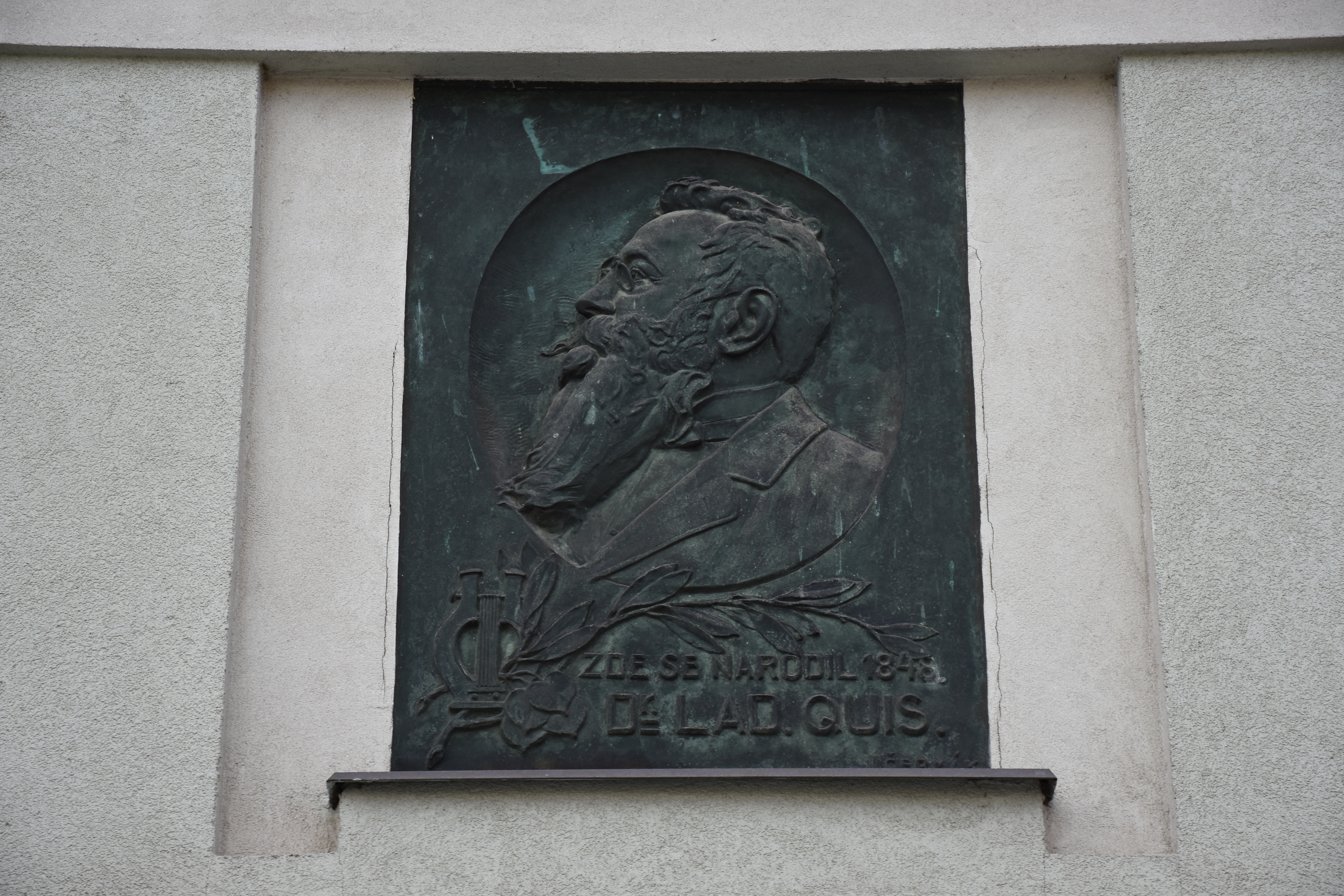
Memorial plaque in Čáslav

Quis was born on 7 February 1846 in Čáslav, Bohemia, Austrian Empire (now the Czech Republic). He was born to the physician Ignác Quis and his wife Veronika, née Matieková. His education began at a grammar school in Prague, then continued at the gymnasium in Tábor, during the time its Director was the well known Czech patriot, Václav Křížek.

At this time, he was already engaged in literary activities; creating a literary association (Slavoj), and a magazine (Lužnice). In 1865, he published his first poems and short stories in Tábor (a local magazine that was published until 1941). After graduating, he returned to Prague to study law, and received his doctorate in 1874.

In 1872, he began work as an editor at the magazine, Slovan, replacing Karel Sabina, who went into hiding, under suspicion of being a police informant. There, he mainly wrote literary articles and feuilletons. After a relatively short time, he left to join the newspaper, Národních listů. He was eventually forced to give up journalism, due to an eye disease. After 1881, he worked as a lawyer in Čáslav then, in 1884, moved to Přelouč, where he settled and started a practice.

He established a good reputation there, and was involved in many civic projects, including a library (1902) and a new evangelical church, with an impressive tower (1905). In 1901, he was elected an "extraordinary member" of the Česká akademie věd a umění (Czech Academy of Sciences and Arts).

Over the course of his career, he contributed to numerous magazines, including Květy, Lumír, Paleček and Humoristické listy. He also provided articles for several almanacs.

Quis died on 1 September 1913 in Černošice.
