= Olga Hudlická =

Czech-born English physiologist (1926–2014)

- 1990 award ceremony photograph
- Born: 11 July 1926; Přelouč, Czechoslovakia
- Died: 3 May 2014 (aged 87); Birmingham, England
- Other names: Olga Hudlicka, Olga Klein-Hudlicka
- Occupations: scientist, academic
- Known for: studying vascular development and muscle blood flow
- Notable work: Angiogenesis, 1986

Olga Hudlická (11 July 1926 – 3 May 2014) was a Czech-British physiologist. She fled the normalization of communism in Czechoslovakia and moved to England. Working at the University of Birmingham, she studied blood flow and restriction, as well as capillary growth in cardiac and skeletal muscles.

== Early life ==
Olga Hudlická was born on 11 July 1926 Přelouč, Czechoslovakia to Marie (née Babáčková) and Jaroslav Hudlický. Her mother worked as a clerk and her father was an engineer in Přelouč. Hudlická began her schooling in Olomouc and then completed her secondary education in Prague. During her schooling, the Nazis invaded and occupied her homeland. After completing her mandatory work brigades, she finished high school in 1945. When World War II ended, Hudlická began her medical studies at Charles University, earning her medical degree in 1950. That same year, she married a physician who worked at Prague's main hospital, Andrei Klein.

Hudlická continued her education at the Institute of Physiology of the Czechoslovak Academy of Sciences (Czech: Fyziologický ústav (FGÚ)), inspired to study muscle blood flow by the work of Ernest Gutmann. Completing her PhD in 1954, she was invited to work in the Pharmacology Department at the Karolinska Institute of Stockholm in 1960. That same year, she became the honorary secretary of the Czechoslovak Physiological Society. In 1964, she was again invited to study abroad and took a position at Duke University Medical Center in Durham, North Carolina. After completing her Doctor of Science degree in 1968 at FGÚ, she returned to Duke to study in the laboratory of Gene Renkin. Despite the Cold War, the liberalization during the Prague Spring allowed her obtain permission for the additional studies and to attend the International Congress of Physiological Sciences, held that year in Washington, D. C.

By the time that Hudlická returned to Czechoslovakia, just before Christmas, the period of liberalization was over and the Soviet Union had brought in tanks to suppress the Czechoslovak government. In spite of the return to authoritarianism, Hudlická was allowed to present a paper at Oxford's Physiological Society in the summer of 1969. While they were in England, she and her husband made plans to evacuate their family from Czechoslovakia. Soon after their return to the country, on the pretense of a holiday visit with friends, they flew their son to London and sent their daughter to Colmar in northern France. With the children securely out of the country, Hudlická and Klein packed a small suitcase and drove to visit friends in Hungary. From Hungary, the couple drove on to France to meet their daughter, via Austria and Italy. In Paris, they were reunited with their son and the family made their way to Zürich, Switzerland, where they met Hudlická's mother and put her on a plane to USA for a visit with Hudlická's older brother while the family decided where to settle. Their escape occurred just before the Czechoslovak borders were closed on 15 September 1969.

== Career ==
Hudlická obtained work at the Max Planck Institute, but by the end of the year, she and her children moved to England as she had accepted an invitation to join the department of physiology of Birmingham University. By February 1970, her husband and mother were reunited with the family. Klein began working at a hospital in Birmingham, while Hudlická resumed her interest in blood flow. She published a monograph in 1973, Muscle Blood Flow, which was followed by Angiogenesis in 1986. This work was influential in its investigation of capillary growth in cardiac and skeletal muscles. Evaluating the mechanisms that regulate blood flow and the process by which new blood vessels form, Hudlická recognized that by indirectly using electrical stimulation on skeletal muscles, one could alter the mechanisms which deliver oxygen and nutrients to muscles. The therapeutic implications for patients included resistance to fatigue and increased blood flow, similar to that obtained by exercise training, for patients afflicted with heart failure, hypertension, or stroke. Hudlická authored or co-authored over 200 publications, edited and reviewed works for such publications as Microcirculation, and trained doctoral students. She served as honorary secretary of the British Microcirculation Society between 1985 and 1992 and as its president from 1996 to 1999.

Hudlická served as a visiting professor at many international universities, including the Central University of Venezuela in Caracas, the University of California at Davis, and the University of Frankfurt am Main. She was the recipient of numerous awards, including delivering the Annual Review Lecture of the Physiological Society in 1990; the Benjamin W. Zweifach Award of the Microcirculatory Society in 1996; and the Malpighi Award of the European Society for Microcirculation in 2008.

After her retirement in 1993, Hudlická continued working as a professor emeritus and continued practicing in surgery and conducting research. Among works she published were Application of Muscle/Nerve Stimulation in Health and Disease in 2008 and several cookbooks detailing recipes to treat specific types of ailments and disease.

== Death and legacy ==
Hudlická died on 3 May 2014, after a fall. Her work on the mechanisms regulating the growth of capillaries, how cancerous tumors are invaded by blood vessels and new blood vessels are formed, provided fundamental understanding of muscle performance and therapeutic approaches which can be used to alleviate vascular disease.
