= Lovci orchidejí =

1920 novel by František Flos

Lovci orchidejí is a Czech novel, written by František Flos. It was first published in 1920.
