= František Flos =

Czech writer

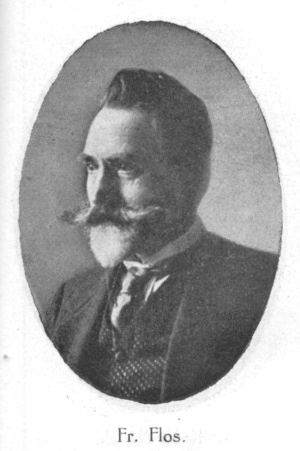

František Flos (27 July 1864, Přelouč – 8 January 1961, Prague) was a Czech writer. His novel, Lovci orchidejí, was published in 1920.
