= Explosia a.s. =

Company in the Czech Republic

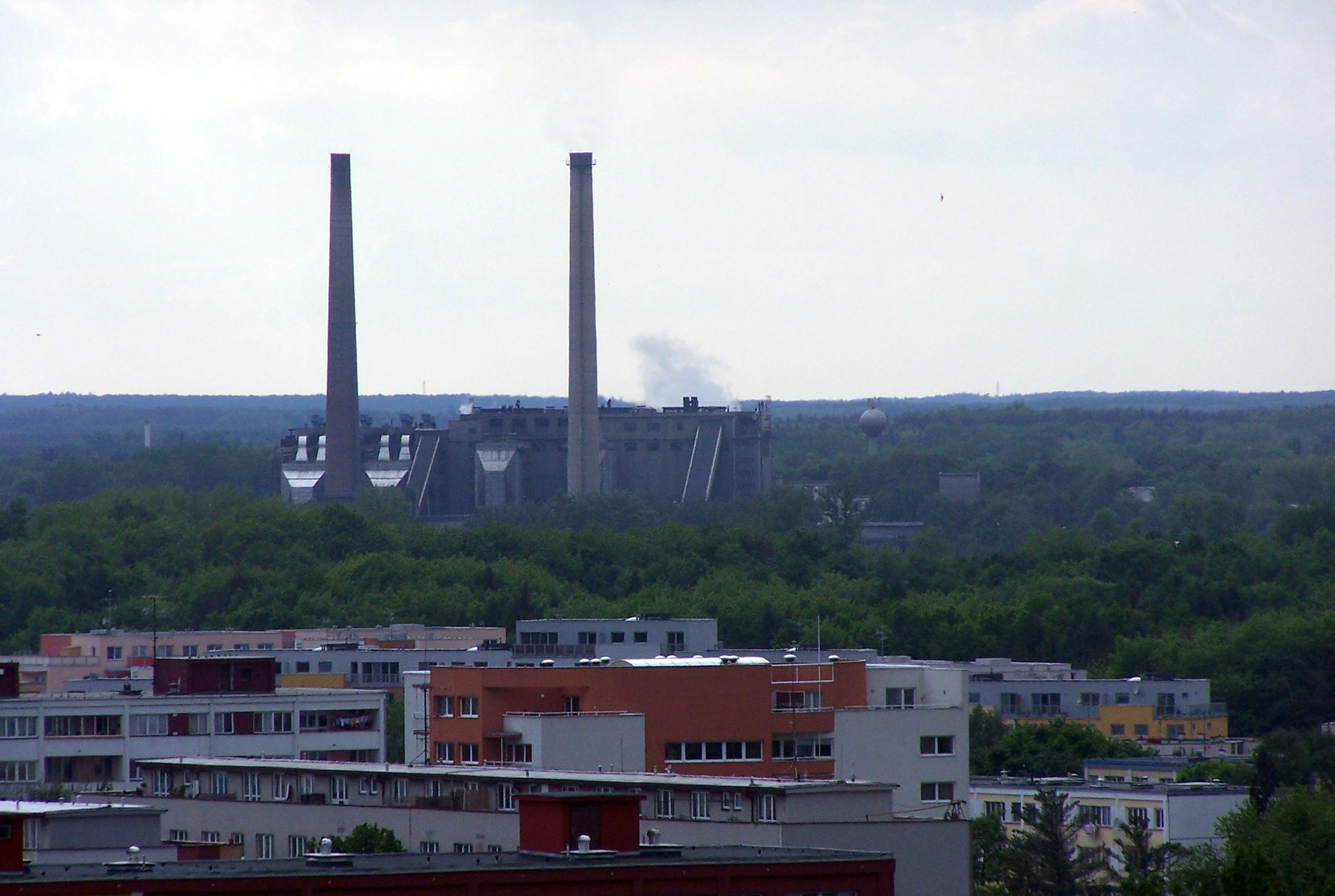
- Type: Joint-stock company
- Industry: Explosives
- Founded: 1920 (historical business); 1998 (current company)
- Headquarters: Pardubice, Czech Republic
- Key people: Ondřej Havlík (chairman of the board)
- Products: Explosives, smokeless powders and propellant charges
- Revenue: CZK 2.996 billion (2025)
- Operating income: CZK 1.073 billion (2025)
- Net income: CZK 838 million (2025)
- Owner: Czech state (100%)
- Website: explosia.cz/en/

Explosia a.s. is a Czech manufacturer of explosives and propellants based in the Semtín district of Pardubice. It is owned by the Czech state through the Ministry of Industry and Trade. It produces industrial and plastic explosives, smokeless powders and propellant charges for large-calibre ammunition. Its best-known product is the Semtex plastic explosive.

== History ==
Explosia was founded in 1920 as Československá akciová továrna na látky výbušné (Czechoslovak Joint-Stock Factory for Explosive Substances), with a factory at Semtín near Pardubice. It took the name Explosia in 1934. During the German occupation, Explosia was placed under Zbrojovka Brno, part of the Reichswerke Hermann Göring group. Explosia and the neighbouring Synthesia chemical works merged in 1946. The merged company was named Synthesia.

In 1954, Synthesia’s research facilities passed to the newly established Research Institute of Industrial Chemistry (VÚPCH). Researchers from Synthesia and the former Explosia joined the institute. It continued the explosives research carried out at Semtín since the 1920s. Work on plastic explosives during the 1950s led to Semtex, which became the company’s best-known product.

The present joint-stock company was formed in 1998 when the explosives business was separated from Synthesia. It belonged to the Agrofert group before the Czech state bought it in 2002. The two neighbouring companies continued to work together, with Synthesia supplying nitrocellulose for Explosia’s production.

After Russia’s invasion of Ukraine in 2022, demand for ammunition rose and Explosia began expanding production. In 2024, it received a €10 million grant through the European Union’s Act in Support of Ammunition Production programme. The expansion plans called for capacity to make 200,000 combustible artillery propellant modules a year by 2027, up from 80,000. The company also planned to increase smokeless-powder production.
