= Stanislav Brebera =

- Born: 10 August 1925; Přelouč, Czechoslovakia
- Died: 11 May 2012 (aged 86); Pardubice, Czech Republic

Stanislav Brebera (10 August 1925 – 11 May 2012) was a Czech chemist. He was born in Přelouč and died in Pardubice.

Brebera spent his career in Czechoslovak state-hold Research Institute for Chemical Industry, currently Explosia in Pardubice. He is best known for the developing the plastic explosive known as Semtex in the late 1950s, which was put on the market in 1964.
