= Polabí =

Coordinates: 50°10′N 15°05′E

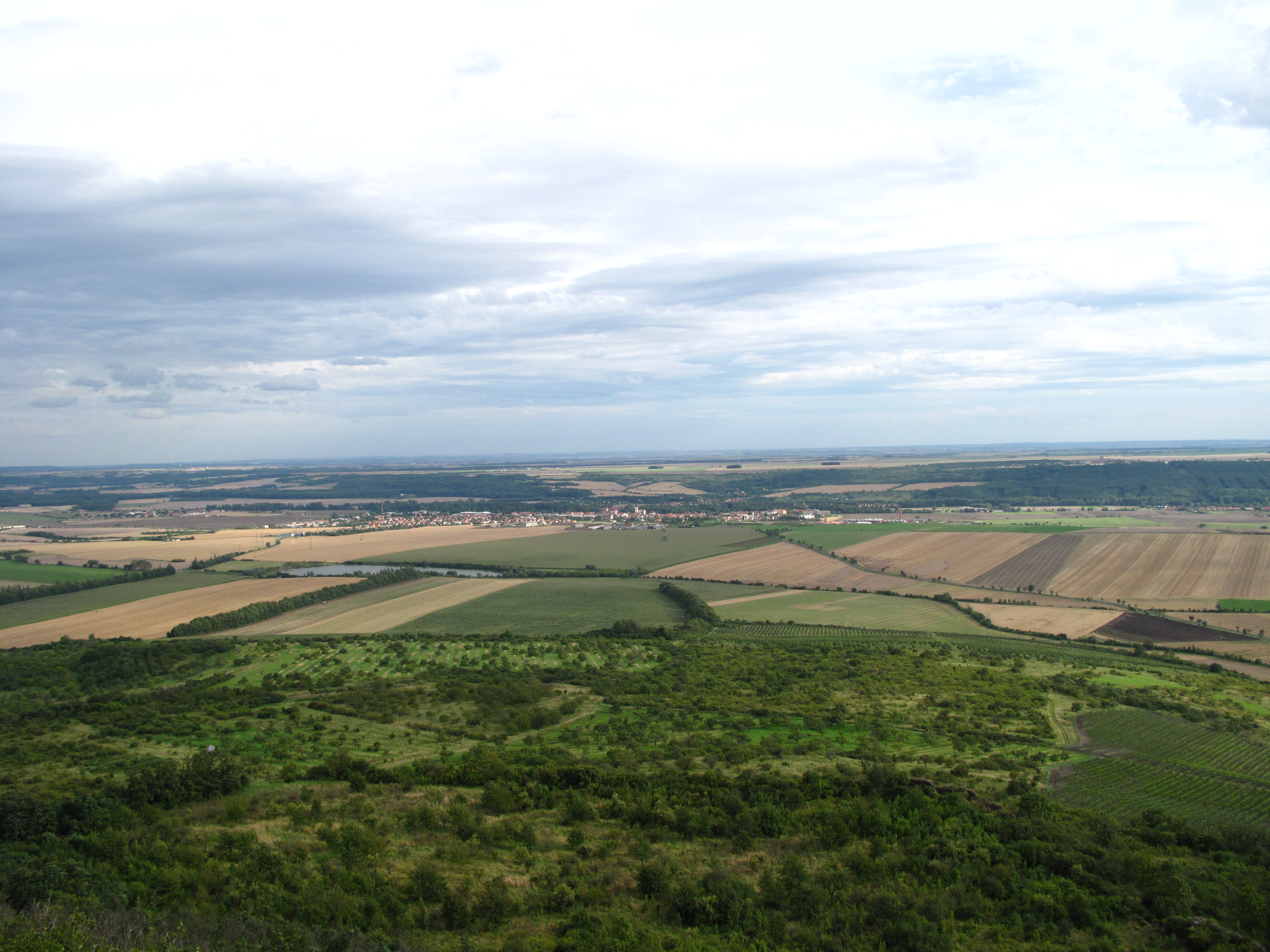
Polabí from Hazmburk

Polabí (German: Elbeland) is the traditional and informal name for a lowland region located mainly in the Central Bohemian Region of the Czech Republic.

== Etymology ==
The name comes from Czech po Labi, meaning "along the Elbe". The same linguistic construction gave its name to the now extinct Polabian Slavs in today's Germany.

== Geography ==
The region, without clear boundaries, extends along the river Elbe, approximately between the towns of Pardubice and Mělník, where the Elbe flows together with Vltava. In wider sense, it stretches further westward to the lowland along the Ohře river. Its elevation ranges roughly between 150 and 300 metres above sea level.

== Agriculture ==
Polabí is the most fertile part of Bohemia and the core area, from where the medieval state of the Czechs developed. It is one of the most important agricultural areas in Central Europe and all the types of vegetables (thermophilic, cold-resistant and frost-resistant) are grown here.
