= Ruchovci =

Group of Czech poets and writers

Ruchovci (also called as škola národní – National School) was a group of Czech poets and writers born between 1845 and 1855. The members dealt with social and national problems that were current at the time. They were against foreign influences on Czech literature. In order to achieve this, they supported patriotism of Slavicism and the independence of Czech history and the landscape. In 1868 their literary almanac called Almanach Ruch was published.

== Authors ==
- Eliška Krásnohorská
- Svatopluk Čech
- Ladislav Quis
- Josef Václav Sládek (just in the beginning)

== See also ==
- Czech National Revival
- Májovci
- Lumírovci
