= Milešovka =

Coordinates: 50°33.314′N 13°55.892′E

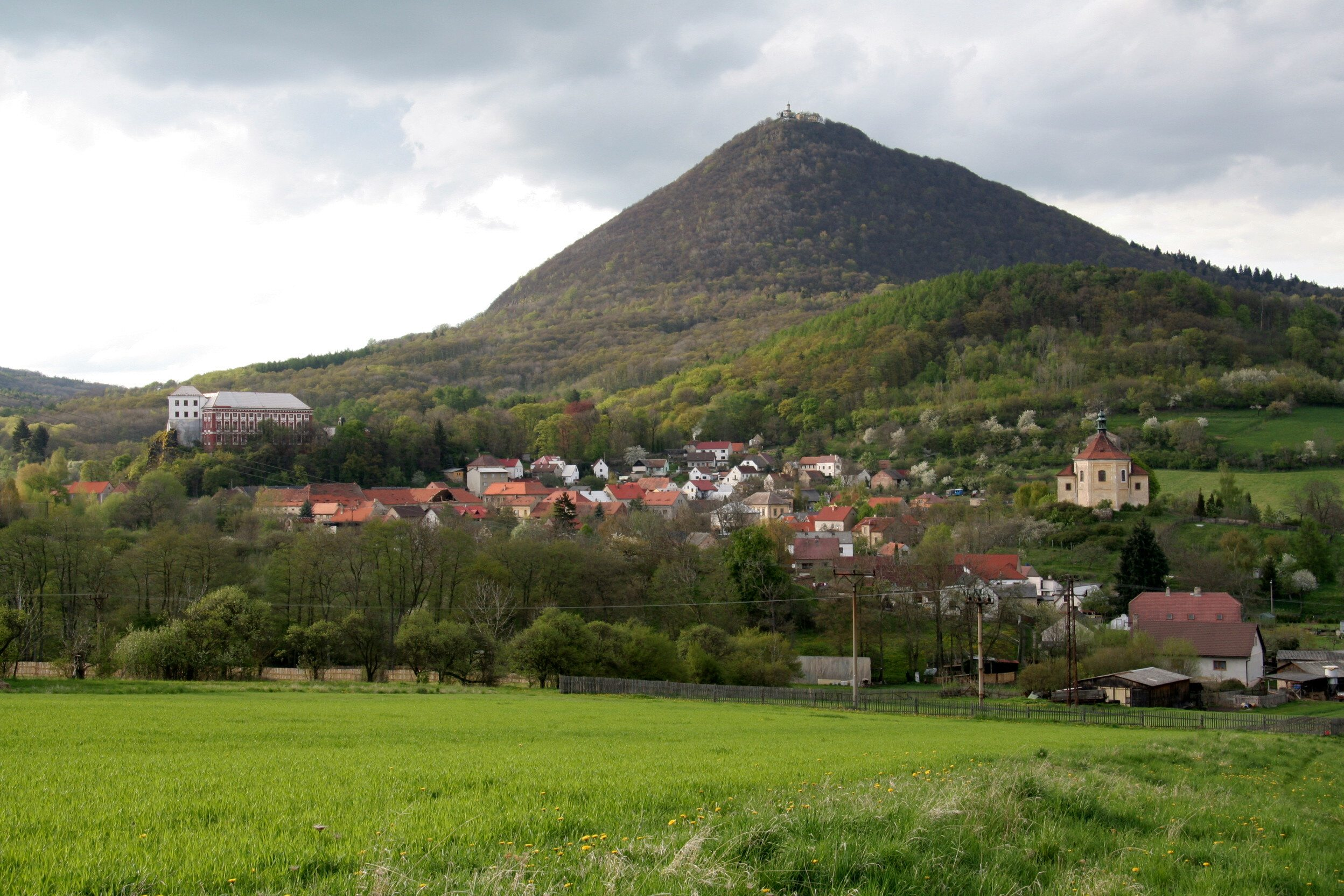
Milešovka

Milešovka is the highest mountain of the Central Bohemian Uplands in the Czech Republic. It has an altitude of 837 m (2,746 ft). The height difference between the foot and summit is 300 metres. Alexander von Humboldt claimed the view to be the third nicest view in the world.

== Climate ==
Milešovka is at an altitude of 837 metres above sea level and therefore has a pronounced alpine climate. This results in the average temperature in the region being three to four degrees Celsius cooler than Prague.

Climate data for Milešovka (1991-2020 normals, extremes 1905-present)
Month	Jan	Feb	Mar	Apr	May	Jun	Jul	Aug	Sep	Oct	Nov	Dec	Year
Record high °C (°F)	11.5 (52.7)	16.4 (61.5)	22.5 (72.5)	27.7 (81.9)	30.7 (87.3)	36.0 (96.8)	35.9 (96.6)	36.5 (97.7)	31.0 (87.8)	23.7 (74.7)	16.1 (61.0)	13.5 (56.3)	36.5 (97.7)
Mean daily maximum °C (°F)	−0.8 (30.6)	1.1 (34.0)	5.8 (42.4)	12.5 (54.5)	16.9 (62.4)	20.1 (68.2)	22.3 (72.1)	22.6 (72.7)	16.9 (62.4)	10.4 (50.7)	3.7 (38.7)	0.0 (32.0)	11.0 (51.8)
Daily mean °C (°F)	−2.9 (26.8)	−2.1 (28.2)	1.3 (34.3)	6.6 (43.9)	10.8 (51.4)	14.1 (57.4)	16.2 (61.2)	16.0 (60.8)	11.3 (52.3)	6.3 (43.3)	1.4 (34.5)	−2.1 (28.2)	6.4 (43.5)
Mean daily minimum °C (°F)	−5.1 (22.8)	−4.4 (24.1)	−1.6 (29.1)	2.7 (36.9)	6.7 (44.1)	10.2 (50.4)	12.3 (54.1)	12.1 (53.8)	8.2 (46.8)	4.0 (39.2)	−0.6 (30.9)	−3.9 (25.0)	3.4 (38.1)
Record low °C (°F)	−24.0 (−11.2)	−28.3 (−18.9)	−18.1 (−0.6)	−11.0 (12.2)	−6.3 (20.7)	−1.8 (28.8)	3.1 (37.6)	2.8 (37.0)	−1.9 (28.6)	−12.5 (9.5)	−14.5 (5.9)	−20.8 (−5.4)	−28.3 (−18.9)
Average precipitation mm (inches)	29.4 (1.16)	26.6 (1.05)	35.2 (1.39)	31.0 (1.22)	62.2 (2.45)	69.7 (2.74)	80.0 (3.15)	70.9 (2.79)	50.5 (1.99)	42.2 (1.66)	37.3 (1.47)	35.7 (1.41)	570.7 (22.47)
Average precipitation days (≥ 1.0 mm)	8.5	7.6	8.3	6.6	9.6	9.7	10.8	9.4	8.3	8.8	8.2	9.0	104.8
Mean monthly sunshine hours	57.8	84.2	125.5	190.1	223.0	224.6	237.8	234.1	165.9	114.1	54.5	49.4	1,761
Source 1: NOAA
Source 2: Czech Hydrometeorological Institute
