= Klapý =

- Municipality
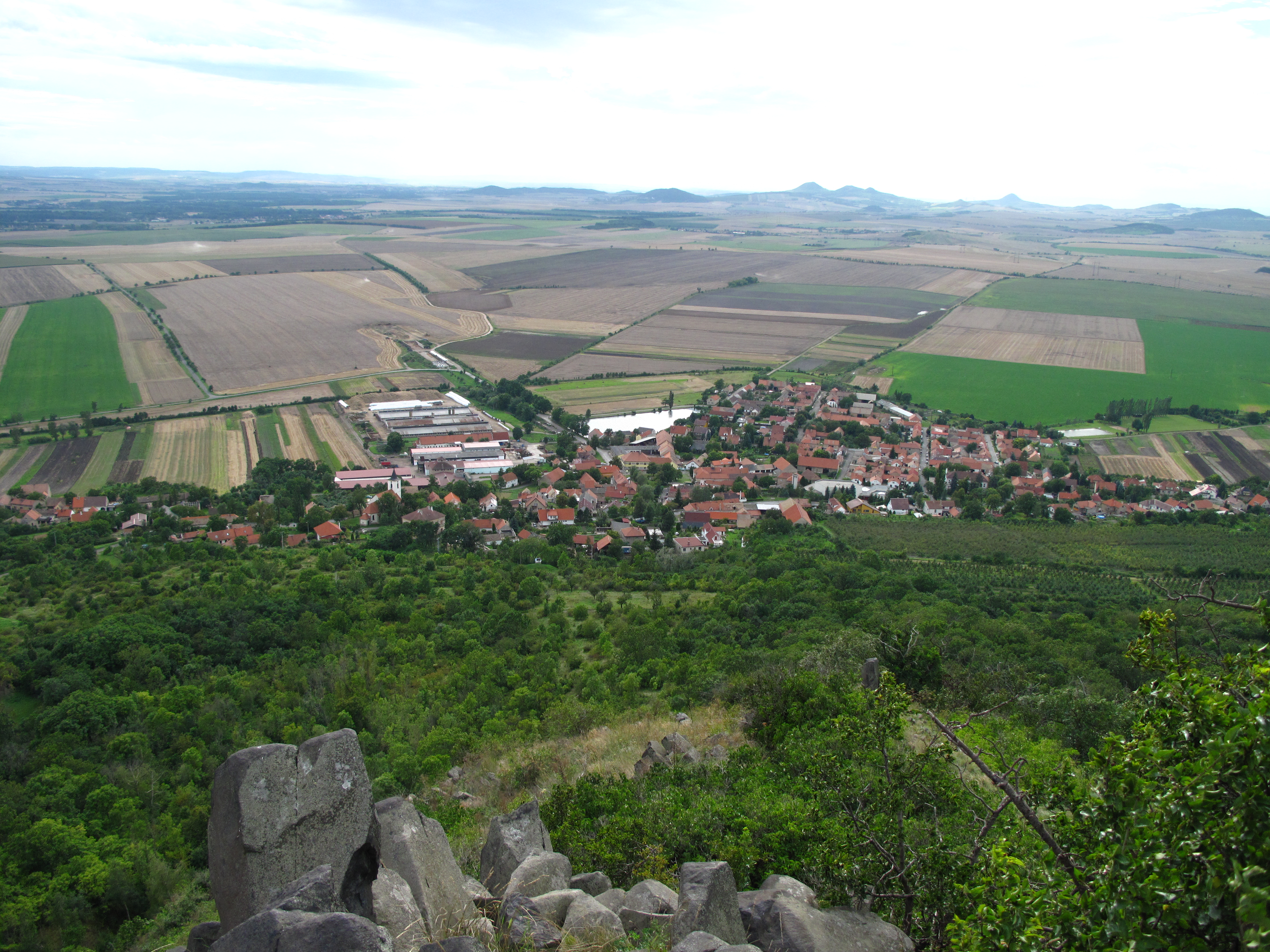
- Klapý seen from Hazmburk

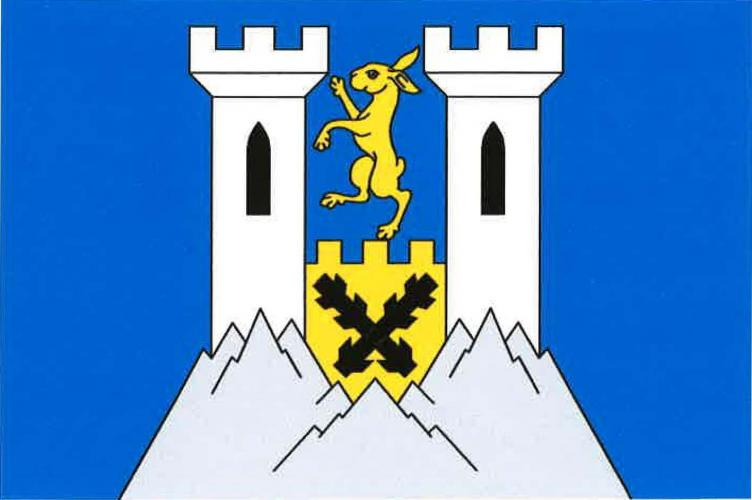
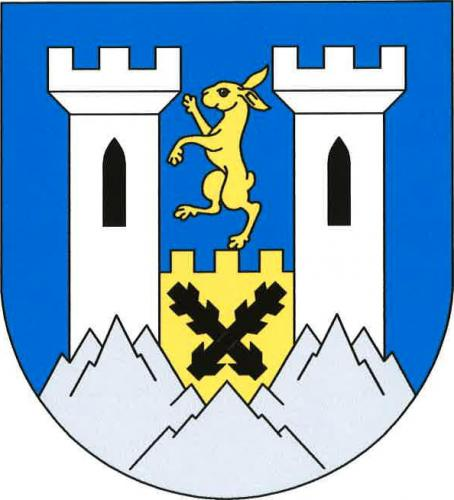
- Flag Coat of arms

- Location in the Czech Republic
- Coordinates: 50°25′53″N 14°0′24″E
- Country: Czech Republic
- Region: Ústí nad Labem
- District: Litoměřice
- First mentioned: 1197

Area
  - Total: 8.95 km^{2} (3.46 sq mi)
- Elevation: 239 m (784 ft)

Population (2026-01-01)
  - Total: 482
  - Density: 53.9/km^{2} (139/sq mi)
- Time zone: UTC+1 (CET)
  - Summer (DST): UTC+2 (CEST)
- Postal code: 411 16
- Website: www.klapy.cz

Klapý is a municipality and village in Litoměřice District in the Ústí nad Labem Region of the Czech Republic. It has about 500 inhabitants.

== Etymology ==
The initial name of the village was Klepý. The name was derived from the Old Czech word klepati ('to drive an animal into a trap'). In the 16th century, it was distorted to Klapý. The name is a rare example of a Czech toponym formed by adding the suffix -ý.

== Geography ==
Klapý is located about 14 kilometres (9 mi) southwest of Litoměřice and 26 km (16 mi) south of Ústí nad Labem. It lies in a flat agricultural landscape in the Lower Ohře Table. The highest point is the Hazmburk hill at 429 m (1,407 ft) above sea level.

== History ==
The first written mention of Klapý is from 1197, when a part of the village was donated to the Teplá Abbey. In 1237, the abbey bought the second part of the village. In the second half of the 13th century, Klapý Castle was founded on a hill above the village. In 1300, the estate was owned by the Lichtemburk family.

The Klapý estate was then shortly owned by King John of Bohemia, who sold it to the Zajíc of Valdek family. From 1341, the castle was known as Hazmburk and the family called themselves Zajíc of Hazmburk. The family held the Hazmburk estate until 1558, when they sold it to the Lobkowicz family. In 1586, the castle was described as abandoned and Klapý was a part of the Libochovice estate. In 1613, the estate was acquired by the Sternberg family. From 1676 until 1849, the estate was owned by the Dietrichstein family.

== Demographics ==
Historical population

Year	Pop.	±%
1869	709	—
1880	761	+7.3%
1890	800	+5.1%
1900	772	−3.5%
1910	903	+17.0%

Year	Pop.	±%
1921	851	−5.8%
1930	862	+1.3%
1950	640	−25.8%
1961	634	−0.9%
1970	565	−10.9%

Year	Pop.	±%
1980	570	+0.9%
1991	486	−14.7%
2001	532	+9.5%
2011	489	−8.1%
2021	474	−3.1%

Source: Censuses

== Transport ==
There are no railways or major roads passing through the municipality.

== Sights ==
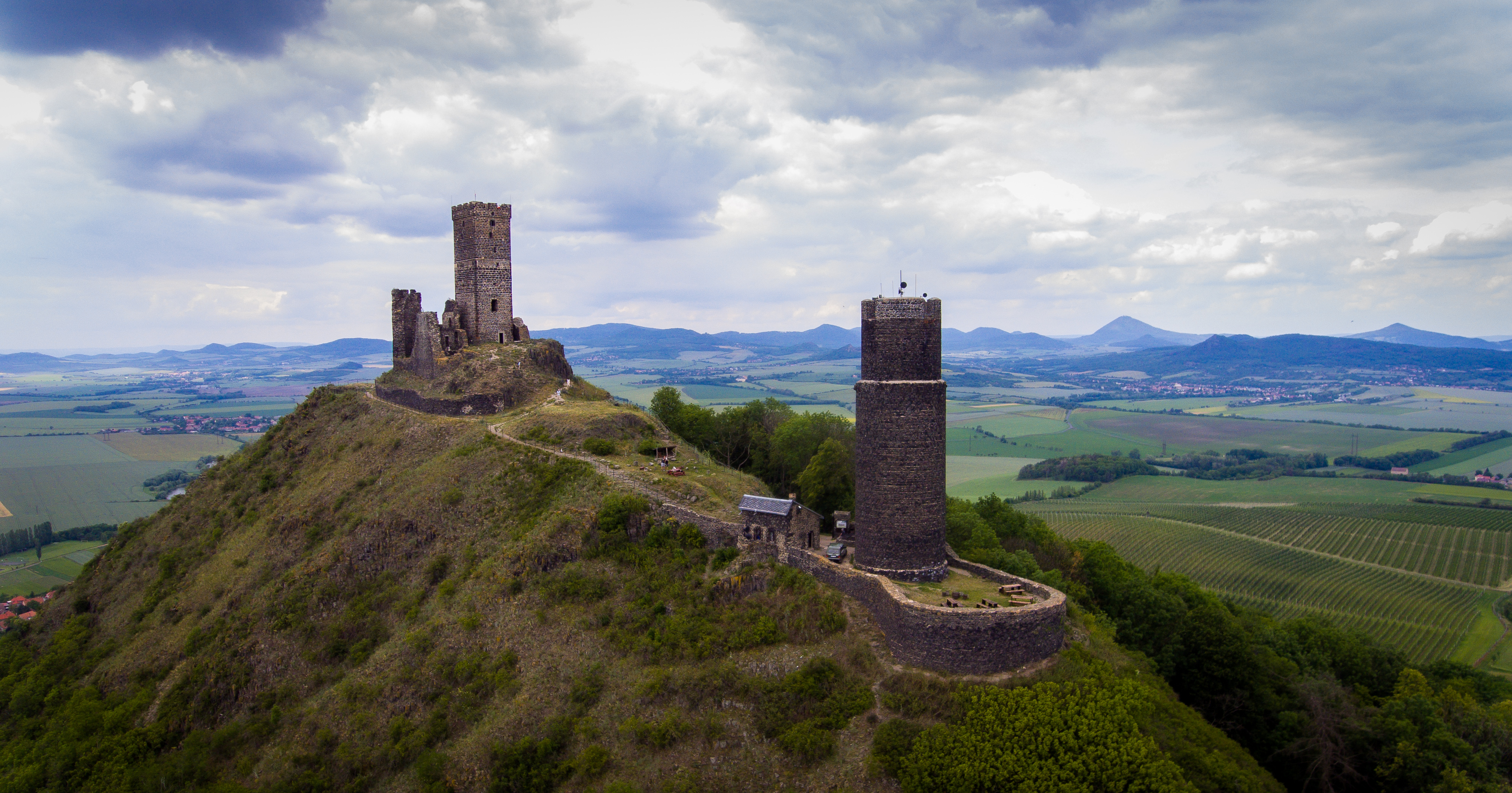
Hazmburk Castle

There is a ruin of the medieval Hazmburk Castle (also spelled Házmburk) on the Hazmburk hill. Today it is owned by the state and is open to the public. The so-called White Tower serves as a lookout tower.

The Church of Saint John the Baptist was built in the Gothic style in the 14th century and restored in 1493. In 1779, it was rebuilt in the Baroque style.

== Notable people ==
- Lubor J. Zink (1920–2003), Czech-Canadian writer
