= Central Bohemian Uplands =

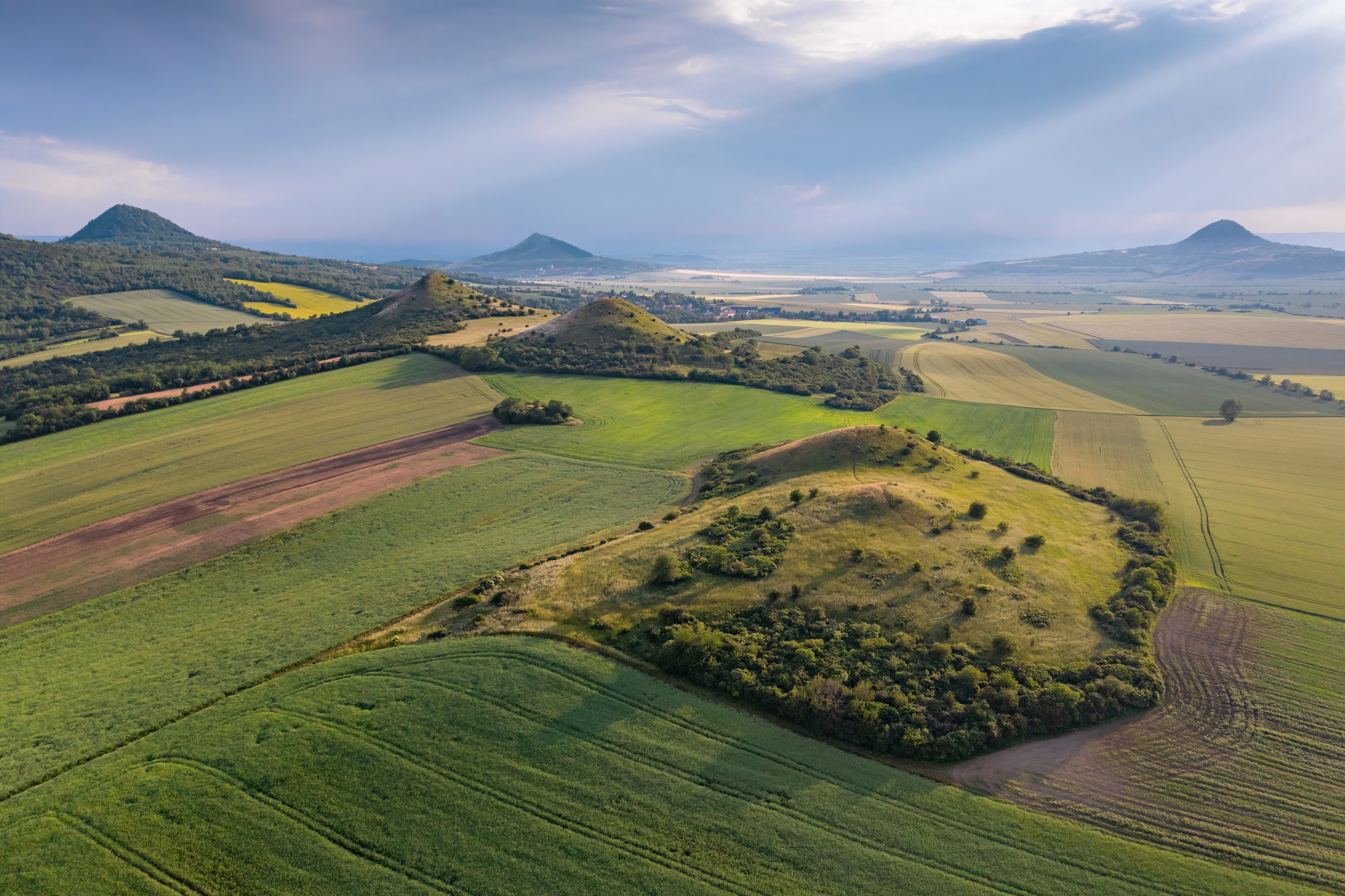
- Hills Malý Křižák, Křižák, Brník, Srdov and Milá

Highest point
- Peak: Milešovka
- Elevation: 837 m (2,746 ft)

Dimensions
- Length: 70 km (43 mi)
- Area: 1,265 km^{2} (488 mi^{2})

Naming
- Native name: České středohoří (Czech)

Geography
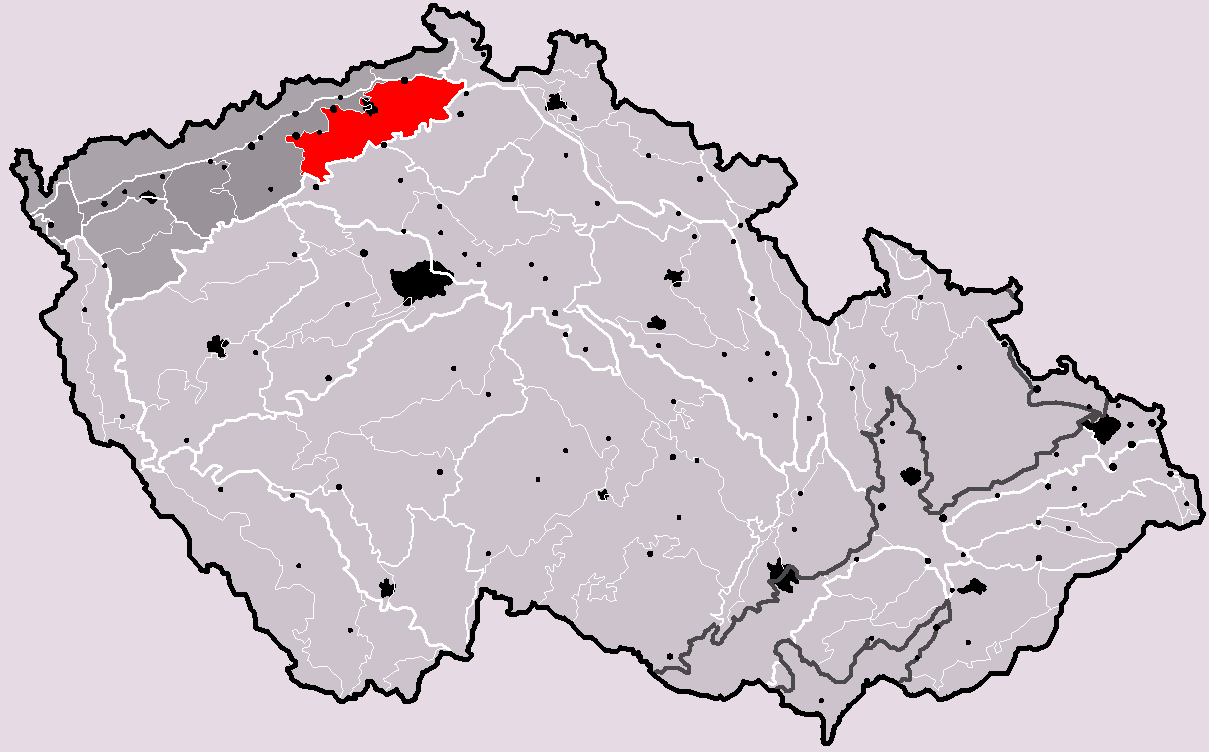
- Central Bohemian Uplands in the geomorphological system of the Czech Republic
- Country: Czech Republic
- Regions: Ústí nad Labem, Liberec
- Range coordinates: 50°36′N 14°3′E
- Parent range: Podkrušnohorská Macroregion

Geology
- Rock type(s): Basalt, trachyte, andesite

The Central Bohemian Uplands (also known as Central Bohemian Highlands; Czech: České středohoří, Czech pronunciation: [ˈtʃɛskɛː ˈstr̝̊ɛdoɦor̝iː]) is a highland and geomorphological mesoregion of the Czech Republic. It is located mostly in the Ústí nad Labem Region.

== Geomorphology ==
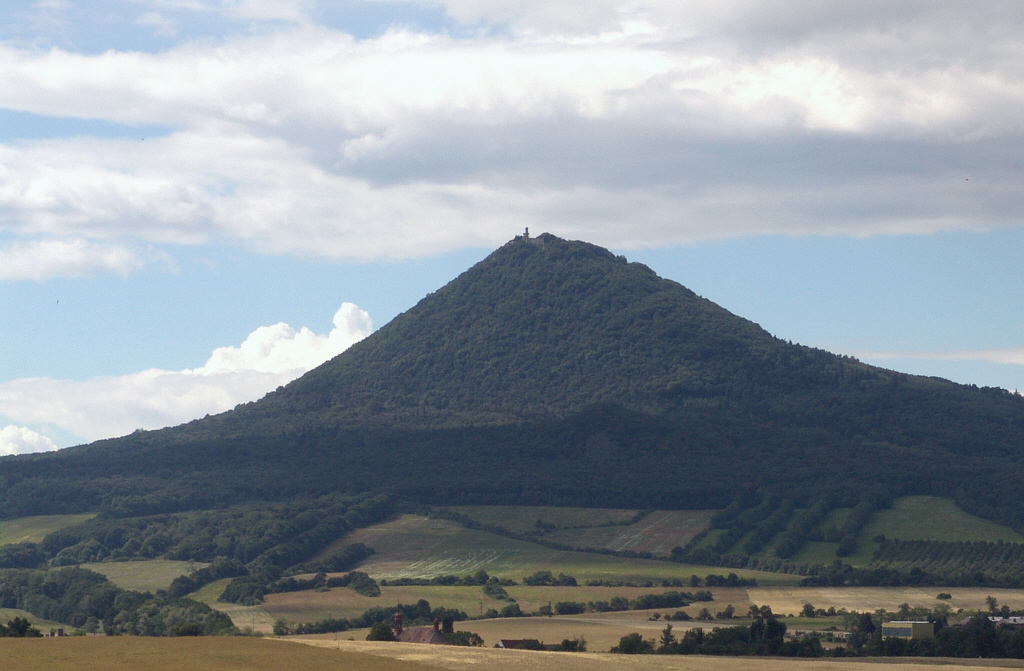
Milešovka

The Central Bohemian Uplands is a mesoregion of the Podkrušnohorská Macroregion within the Bohemian Massif. It has the character of a rugged highland and, in some places, a flat mountain range. The area is very rugged and is divided into two halves by the incised valley of the Elbe River, which is deepened up to 400–500 m into the surrounding relief. The uplands are further subdivided into the microregions of Verneřice Uplands and Milešovka Uplands. The southeastern part (Milešovka Uplands) is characterized by numerous isolated volcanic inselbergs. The northeastern part (Verneřice Uplands) consists mainly of flat ridges, but the edges of this area are rugged with large elevation differences.

The area is characterized by distinctively sharp isolated peaks. The highest peaks of the Central Bohemian Uplands are:

- Milešovka, 837 m (2,746 ft)
- Hradišťany, 753 m (2,470 ft)
- Kloč, 737 m (2,418 ft)
- Sedlo, 727 m (2,385 ft)
- Kleč, 721 m (2,365 ft)
- Ostrý, 719 m (2,359 ft)
- Kletečná, 706 m (2,316 ft)
- Lipská hora, 689 m (2,260 ft)
- Buková hora, 686 m (2,251 ft)
- Kočičí vrch, 681 m (2,234 ft)

The lowest point of the Central Bohemian Uplands is the Elbe River in Děčín at 122 m (400 ft) above sea level.

== Geography ==
The Central Bohemian Uplands stretches from the southwest to the northeast and is about 70 km (43 mi) long. The region have an area of 1,265 square kilometres (488 sq mi) and an average elevation of 363 metres (1,191 ft).

The most important river is the Elbe, which creates a distinctive valley. Its most important tributaries within the Central Bohemian Uplands are the Ploučnice and Bílina. There are only a few lakes and fishponds here. The most important of them are Lake Žernosecké jezero (formed by flooding a gravel quarry) and Chmelař Pond.

The edge of the territory is lined with important settlements. Among the most populated settlements that extend to the Central Bohemian Uplands are the cities of Ústí nad Labem, Most, Teplice and Děčín, and the towns of Litoměřice and Lovosice. The most important settlements, which are in the Central Bohemian Uplands by their entire territory, are Kamenický Šenov, Benešov nad Ploučnicí, Žandov and Verneřice.

== Nature ==
The forest cover of the area is below average for the Czech Republic. The cultural landscape, influenced by human activity, predominates. However, it is a valuable and balanced landscape, and most of the area of the Central Bohemian Uplands (84%) is protected as the České středohoří Protected Landscape Area. The protected landscape area has an area of 1,068.9 km^{2} (412.7 sq mi).

== Geology ==
The Central Bohemian Uplands were formed by volcanic activity and are the most extensive manifestation of volcanism in the territory of the Czech Republic. Basalt constitutes 73.6% of the geological bedrock. The rest consists of trachyte and, to a small extent, andesite.

== Gallery ==
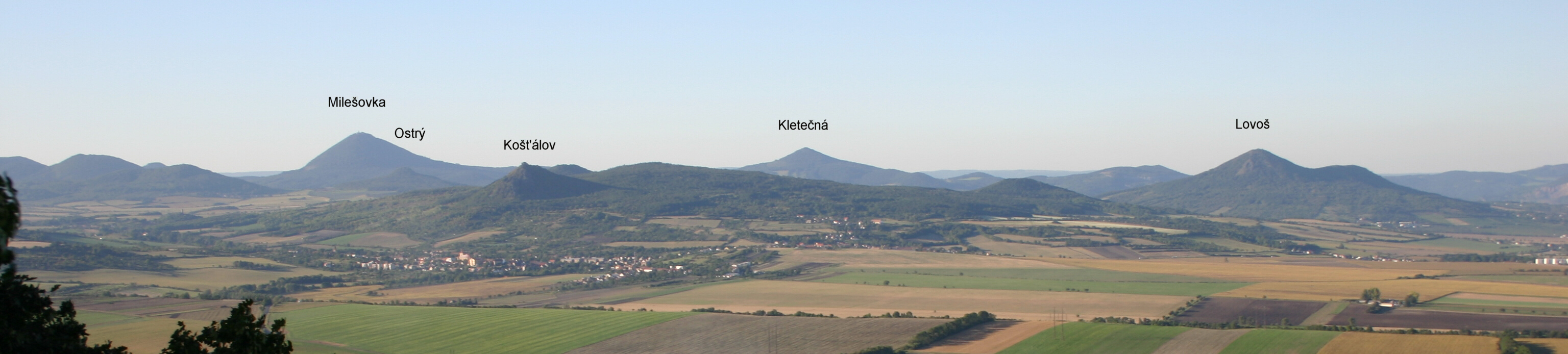
View from Hazmburk

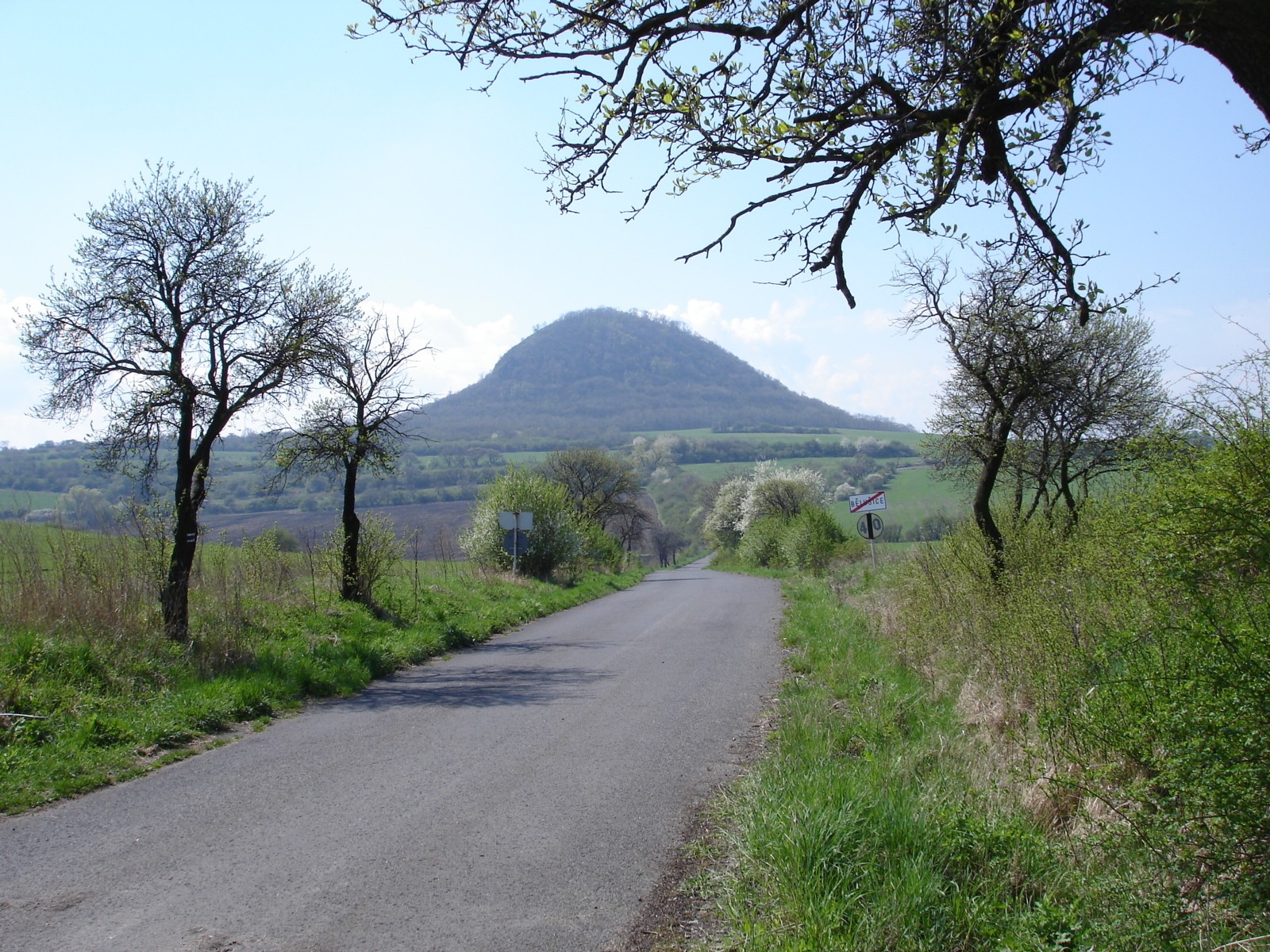
Milá

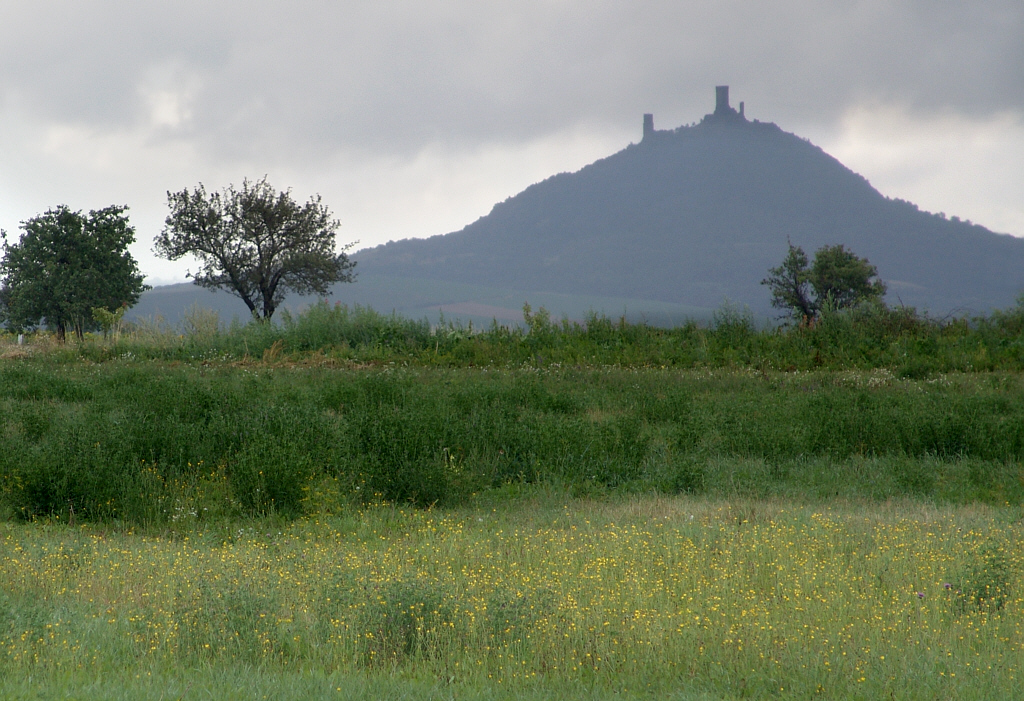
Hazmburk

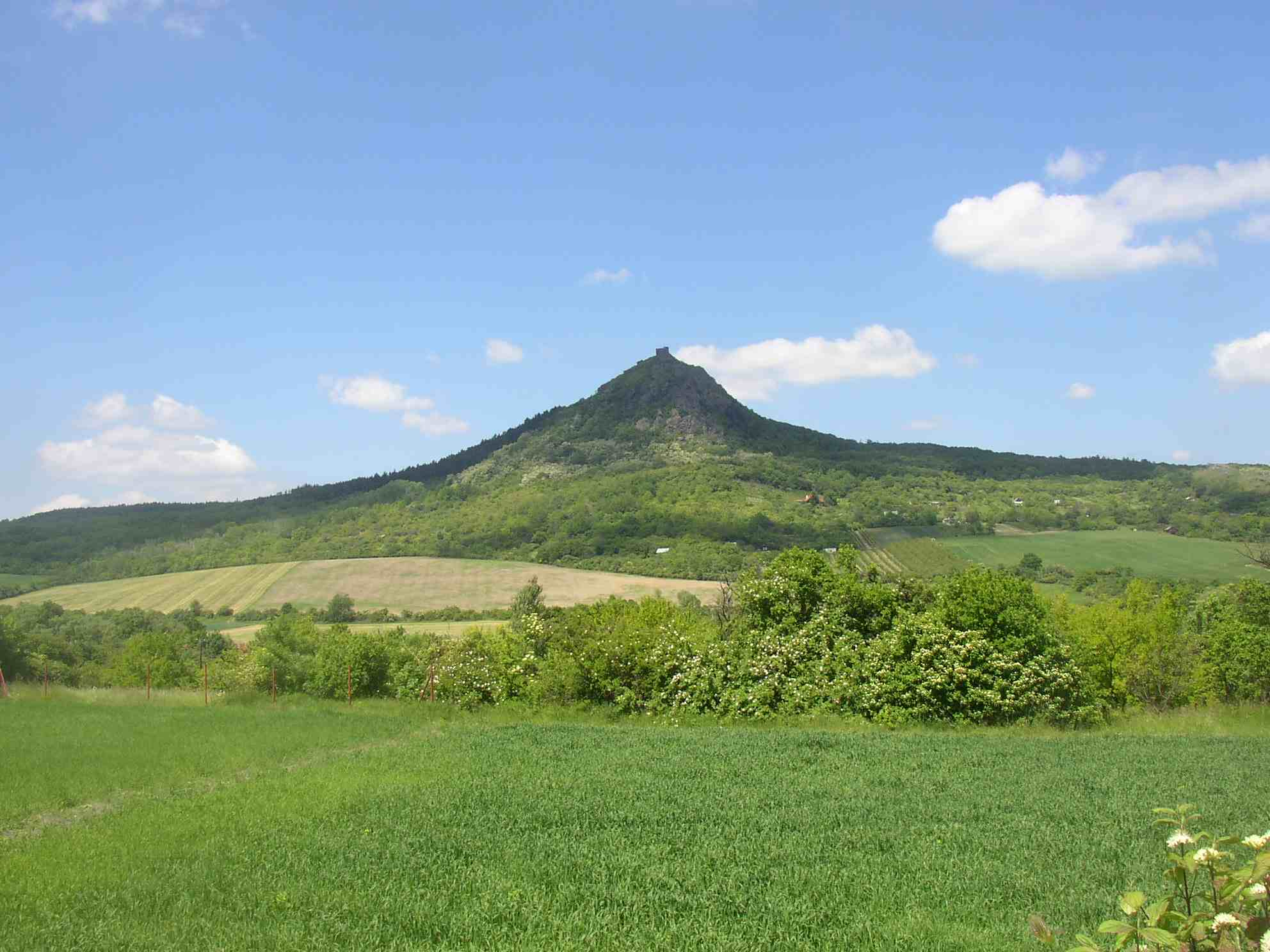
Košťálov

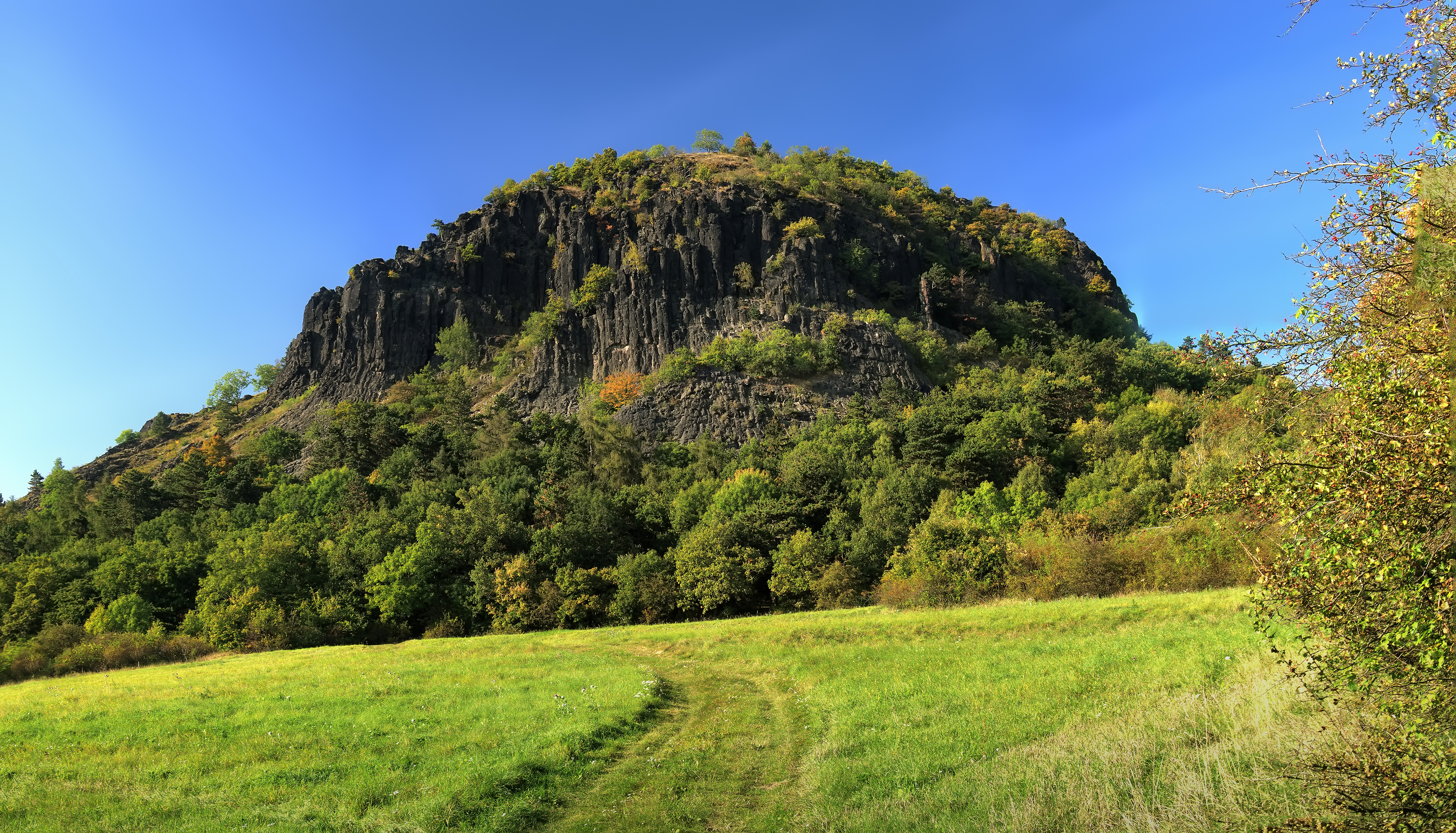
Bořeň
