= Hazmburk =

Coordinates: 50.433°N 14.017°E

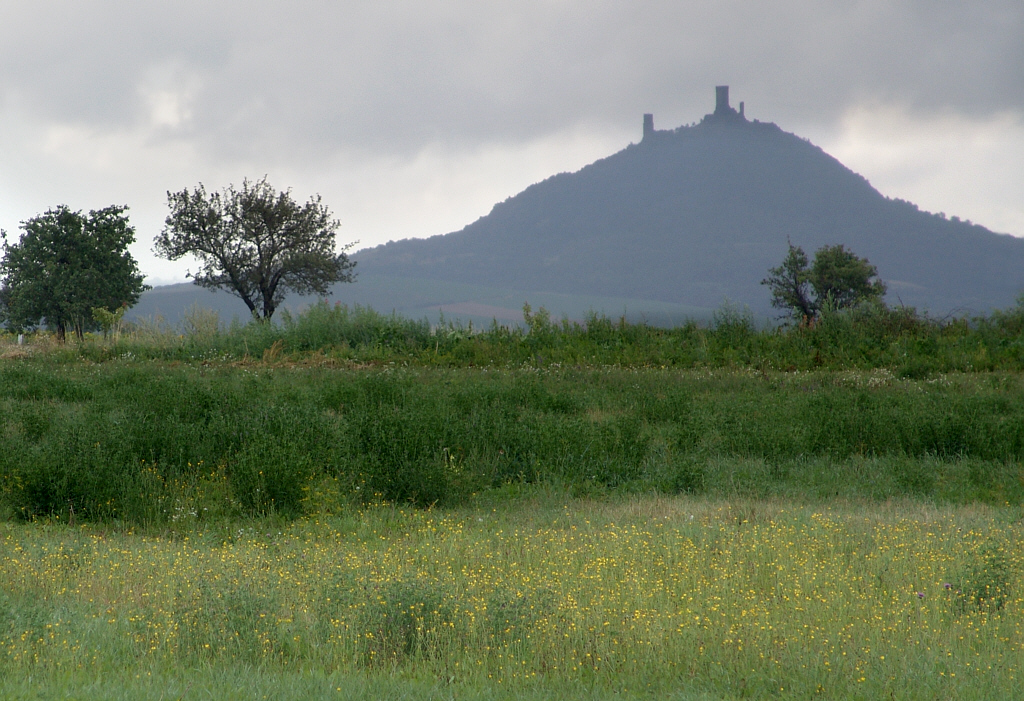
Hazmburk hil, showing the twin towers of the castle

Hazmburk (German: Hasenburg, literally "Hare Castle") is a solitary hill in the Lower Ohře Table plateau with an elevation of 429 m (1,407 ft). It is located in the municipality of Klapý in the Ústí nad Labem Region of the Czech Republic.

== Castle ==
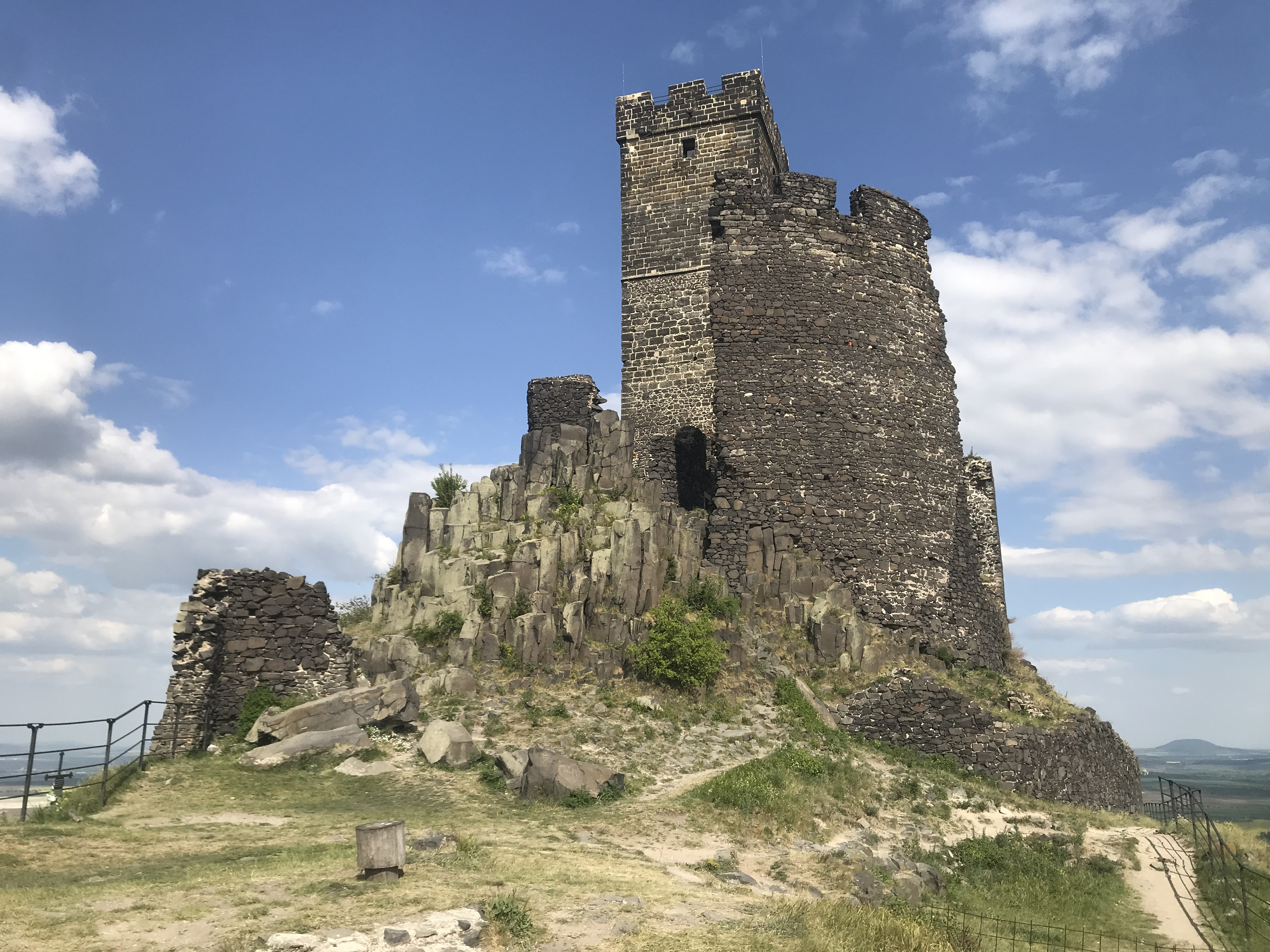
Close-up of the taller of the two remaining towers of the Hazmburk, which has an observation deck on top. The basalt structure of the underlying rock can be clearly seen.

At the top of the mountain, there is the ruin of a medieval castle, of which two towers and some wall fragments are still standing. A smaller first castle was already built there in the late 13th century by the Lichtenburg noble family. Later, the site was home to the Zajíc family: in 1335, Zbyněk Zajíc, a powerful aristocrat during the times of Charles IV, purchased it, and made it the center of his estates. In Czech, the word zajíc means hare, so the name of castle and hill is a medieval play on the name of its most prominent owners, who even had hares in their coat of arms. Zbyněk Zajíc considerably enlarged and extended the castle, and in particular added the two prominent towers which survive to this day.

The castle was never taken by force, despite multiple siege attempts during the Hussite Wars. After these wars, it apparently fell into disuse and gradually was reduced to a ruin: records from the year 1586 already describe it as desolate. During the period of romanticism, the ruins became a source of inspiration for writers, most notably K. H. Mácha.

The castle site is open to the public in summer. The taller of the two towers features an observation deck, and the view of the surrounding countryside that can be had from there is quite spectacular. The other tower is, while also in reasonable condition, not accessible to the public.
