= The Great Debate (Canadian TV series) =

- Genre: talk show/debate
- Presented by: Pierre Berton
- Country of origin: Canada
- Original language: English

Production
- Producer: Elsa Franklin
- Running time: 30-60 minutes

Original release
- Network: Global; CHCH-TV
- Release: 10 January 1974 – 1983

The Great Debate is a Canadian television series that featured debates between pairs of panellists over a given subject. It was first shown on the Global Television Network in 1974, and later broadcast by CHCH-TV from Hamilton, Ontario. The series was produced intermittently until 1983.

== Format ==
Pierre Berton was the host and moderator of a televised debate between two guests who argued about a given proposition. A studio audience of approximately 200 people voted for or against the proposition at the start of the program, and again at the end after the debate to gauge the influence of the debators' arguments.

== Production ==
The Great Debate was produced by My Country Productions, co-owned by series producer Elsa Franklin and Berton.

It was one of the first series broadcast on the fledgling Global Television Network. However, the broadcaster encountered financial distress within months of its debut and owed My Country Productions $48,000. Global offered unsecured creditors such as program producers a short-term 25% payment. Berton, however, proceeded to pay guest debators personally, in full for their appearance and travel.

Global renewed The Great Debate for a second season beginning late 1974. CHCH-TV picked up The Great Debate from Global for its third, 1975-76 season, and aired these in the Tuesday 10 p.m. time slot.

== Episodes ==
=== 1974: first season ===
No.	Resolution	In favour	Opposed	Original air date	Notes
1	Violence is acceptable as a political weapon in a democracy	Pierre Vallières	John Laird	10 January 1974	The motion was overwhelmingly rejected by the studio audience. Robert Lemieux and John Taylor were originally scheduled as debators.
2	The energy crisis is a hoax perpetrated by the major oil companies	Ralph Nader	Darcy McKeough	17 January 1974	
3	Hockey is no longer a sport	Bruce Kidd	Howie Meeker	24 January 1974	
4	Professional prize fighting should be outlawed	Dick Beddoes	George Chuvalo	31 January 1974	
5	Astrology is a valid science	Katherine De Jersey	Lord Soper	7 February 1974	
6	Canadian nationalism is self-destructive	Eliot Janeway	Eric Kierans	14 February 1974	
7	Prisons should be reserved for those who have committed crimes of violence	Jessica Mitford	Desmond Morton	21 February 1974	
8	The health food craze is a rip-off	Gloria Swanson	Seymour Halpern	28 February 1974	
9	Marriage is obsolete	Jim Moran	Diana Dors	7 March 1974	
10	The gods from outer space theory is a fantasy	Ruth Tringham	Erich von Däniken	14 March 1974	
11	The police should be abolished	Jimmy Breslin	David Toma	21 March 1974	
12	(Academy Awards topic)			28 March 1974	
13	Man cannot live without god.	Malcolm Muggeridge	Charles Templeton	4 April 1974	
14	The monarchy should be abolished	William Hamilton	George Brown	11 April 1974	
15	(repeat of 24 January 1974; hockey)			18 April 1974	
16	(no detail available)			25 April 1974	
17	There is no scientific proof that ESP exists.	Daniel Cohen	J. B. Rhine	2 May 1974	
18	Virginity is a priceless asset	Wendy Robin	Albert Ellis	9 May 1974	Robin was president of the Virgin Liberation Front.
19	Freedom of speech is a danger to society	David DePoe	Irving Layton	16 May 1974	DePoe was with Students for a Democratic Society
20	There should not be a graduated income tax	William F. Buckley, Jr.	René Lévesque	23 May 1974	

=== 1974-75: second season ===
These episodes were listed as broadcast on Global Television, broadcast Thursdays and repeated Sundays.

No.	Resolution	In favour	Opposed	Original air date	Notes
1	(season debut)			5 September 1974	
2	Bilingualism is unworkable.	Jacques Parizeau	George Springate	12 September 1974	
2	Canada should legalize abortion on demand	Henry Morgentaler	Heather Morris	19 September 1974	
3				26 September 1974	
4				3 October 1974	
5				10 October 1974	
6	Nuclear reactors are necessary	Edward Teller	Gordon Edwards	17 October 1974	
7	The west should separate from Canada.	Milt Harradence	Réal Caouette	24 October 1974	
8	Playgirl magazine corrupts women.	Alan Abel as "Martin Swaig, Jr."	Marin Scott Milam	31 October 1974	Swaig was ostensibly head of the US office of media communications, Scott Milam was editor of Playgirl. However, Swaig was revealed to be satirist Alan Abel who was conducting a hoax on his opponent.
9	The Nixon-Ford pardon and tapes agreement violates the US Constitution.	I. F. Stone	John McLaughlin	7 November 1974	
10	The inflation crisis demands price and wage control.	Myron Sharpe	David Lewis	14 November 1974	
11				21 November 1974	
12	Women's liberation is destroying society.	George Gilder	Germaine Greer	28 November 1974	
13	Credit cards do more harm than good.	Arthur Hailey	Robert M. MacIntosh	5 December 1974	Hailey was an author; MacIntosh was president of the Bank of Nova Scotia
14				12 December 1974	
15	Prostitution should be legalized			19 December 1974	
16	Interracial marriage will benefit mankind.	David Suzuki	Roy Innis	26 December 1974	
17				2 January 1975	
18				9 January 1975	
19	Living together before marriage is a dangerous experiment			16 January 1975	
20	Having children should be controlled by law			22 January 1975	Moved to Wednesdays

=== 1975-76: third season ===
These episodes are listed as broadcast on the series new flagship station, CHCH-TV, Tuesdays at 10 p.m.

No.	Resolution	In favour	Opposed	Original air date	Notes
1	That Exercise is a Waste of Time	Minnesota Fats	Ed Allen	9 September 1975	
2	Public service strikes should be outlawed			16 September 1975	
3	Mercy killing is justified			23 September 1975	
4	The Bermuda Triangle mystery defies natural explanation			30 September 1975	
5				7 October 1975	
6	The Bermuda Triangle mystery defies natural explanation			14 October 1975	Repeat of 30 September 1975
7	Movies should return to the happy ending			21 October 1975	
8	Dieting is useless			28 October 1975	
9	Ghosts exist			4 November 1975	
10	Modern birth control advocates are using women as guinea pigs			11 November 1975	
11	Violence on the screen is psychologically damaging			18 November 1975	
12	Capital punishment must be abolished			25 November 1975	
13	Divorce cases don't belong in the courts			2 December 1975	
14	History is bunk			9 December 1975	
15	Zionism			16 December 1975	Irving Layton vs. Sam Hadaur
16	The Christian religion has become inadequate			23 December 1975	
17	Homosexuals should have full civil rights			30 December 1975	
18				7 January 1976	Moved to Wednesday evenings
19	Good breeding is still an asset			14 January 1976	
20	Canadian nationalism is dangerous			21 January 1976	
21	Intelligence is genetically inherited			28 January 1976	
22	The 1976 Olympic Games should be abandoned			4 February 1976	
23	Kids today have it too soft			11 February 1976	
24	Hunting is not a sport			18 February 1976	
25	The American dream has become a nightmare			25 February 1976	
26	Car racing is a bloody sport			3 March 1976	
	pre-empted			10 March 1976	
27				17 March 1976	
28				24 March 1976	
29	Repeat of mercy killing episode			31 March 1976	
30	Man should be master in the home			7 April 1976	
31	There should be total gun control			14 April 1976	
32	Repeat of Bermuda Triangle episode			21 April 1976	
33	Repeat of Movies should return to the happy ending			28 April 1976	
	pre-empted for movie			5 May 1976	

=== 1976-77: fourth season ===
The series was broadcast on CHCH-TV on Fridays at 8 p.m. Topics in this season included apartheid and lotteries.

=== 1977-83: later episodes ===
The following episodes are on file with Library and Archives Canada:

Resolution	In favour	Opposed	Original air date	Item number (ISN)	Production date
Television is a destructive force in society	McKenzie Porter	Peter Ustinov		30143	(unknown)
Sexual offenders should be castrated	William Mackie (lawyer)	Simma Holt		30146	22 April 1977
Sports is a masculine rite	Abby Hoffman	Alan Eagleson		30144	18 September 1977
Homosexuals should not be allowed to teach	David Gauthier (chair, University of Toronto Philosophy Department)	Dr John Lee (associate professor of Sociology, University of Toronto Scarborough College)		30145	18 September 1977
Involuntary commitment of mental patients violates their rights	Dr Thomas Szasz (psychiatrist)	Dr Derek Miller		30147	16 October 1977
There is a need for a coaches' union	Alan Eagleson	Dick Beddoes		30148	28 October 1977
Traditional train power is obsolete	Julius Lukasiewicz	Walter Stewart		30149	28 October 1979
The Pope's theology belongs to the Dark Ages	Dr Kathryn Morgan	Dr Gregory Baum		30151	30 October 1979
Promiscuity in a woman is acceptable and desirable	Eleanor Wright Petrine	Joan Sutton		30152	30 October 1979
Nuclear generating stations are necessary and should be constructed	Jon Gilbertson	Norman Rubin		30153	17 November 1979
A North American common market would be the end of Canada	Bob Rae	John Belanger		30154	17 November 1979
Total disarmament is both possible and desirable	Nicolas Parissi	Geoff Buerger		30155	17 November 1979
The medical establishment is inhibiting cancer research	Peter Barry Chowka	Dr Emil Freireich		30156	18 November 1979
Traditional masculinity victimizes men	Dr Herb Goldberg	George Gilder		30157	18 November 1979
Teachers have the right to strike	Margaret Wilson	Dr Stewart Smigh		30158	18 November 1979
Strike breaking should be outlawed	Terry Meagher	David Somerville		30159	20 November 1979
The permissive society has been the worst disaster to hit democracy since Hitler	Sir Edwin Leather	Maryon Kantaroff		30160	20 November 1979
Modern medicine is geared for killing rather than healing	Dr Robert Mendlesohn	Dr Stuart Klein		30161	29 November 1979
Newspapers should be independent of all other business interests	Charles Lynch	Charles Templeton		30165	February 1981
The West should separate	Elmer Knutson	Jack Horner		30162	3 February 1981
Modern cults are dangerous to society	Jane Hawtin	Bart Testa		30163	3 February 1981
Literary critics are irrelevant and irresponsible	Richard Rohmer	Lister Sinclair		30164	3 February 1981
All tobacco advertising should be banned	Garfield Mahood	Don Coxe		30166	4 February 1981
Labour unions are destructive to the economy	Frank Oberle Sr.	Desmond Morton		30167	7 February 1981
Rent controls are necessary	Frank Drea	Basin Kalymon		30168	9 February 1981
Writers' sources should be privileged and protected by law	Harold Horwood	Barbara Amiel		30169	9 February 1981
Women should not marry	Betty Jane Wylie	Catherine McKinnon		30170	10 February 1981
The family is being bombarded unnecessarily by professionals	Ed Shorter	Doug Barr		30171	10 February 1981
It is more rewarding to be short than tall	Ben Wicks	Michael Magee		30172	10 February 1981
Socialism holds more promise for the future than capitalism	Richard Johnston	James Taylor		30173	17 November 1981
The Bachelor of Arts degree is of no earthly use to anybody	Arnold Edinborough	Harold Kaplan		30174	17 November 1981
More sex education is needed	Laura Sabia	Ken Campbell		30175	17 November 1981
Chemical additives make food dangerous	Dr Ross Hume Hal	Dr George Fleishmann		30176	18 November 1981
Movies that depict the sexual exploitation of minors should be censored	Elwy Yost	Ron Base		30177	18 November 1981
Canada needs stronger military defense	Brig Gen Steven Andrunyk	Dr Norman Alcock		30178	18 November 1981
Human rights acts jeopardize civil liberties and human rights	George Jonas	Ian Scott		30179	24 November 1981
There is more fakery than science to para psychology	Henry Gordon	Howard Eisenberg		30180	24 November 1981
In the present context monetarism is bunk	Paul Hellyer	Prof Michael Parkin		30181	24 November 1981
Paid maternity leave is every woman's right	Grace Hartman	Larry Solway		30182	25 November 1981
Television evangelists are dishonest and deplorable	Tom Harpur	Rev Gerald Morgan		30183	25 November 1981
Women should marry younger men	Annabelle King	Sam Solecki		30184	25 November 1981
The Kent Commission proposals are a threat to freedom of the press	Bill Heine	Tom Kent		30192	1982?
Society is overpoliced	Jack Gemmell	David Humphrey		30185	23 March 1982
Equal rights for women in the workforce should be law	Dierdre Gallagher	Claire Hoy		30187	23 March 1982
Legal abortion is a woman's right	Marian Engel	Laura McArthur		30188	23 March 1982
The prison system brutalizes and creates monsters	Dr Daniel Paitich	Robert McGee		30189	23 March 1982
All children have a right to public day care	Pat Schultz	Frank Drea		30190	24 March 1982
There should be compulsory retirement	Dennis Braithwaite	Ross Stevenson		30191	24 March 1982
Public taxes should go to the school of your choice	Lyle McBurney	Doug Little		30193	30 March 1982
Metric conversion is mandatory madness	Bob Runciman	Gerry McCauley		30194	30 March 1982
Scientific evidence better supports creation than evolution	Dr Walter Brown	Dr Peter Moens		30195	31 March 1982
Totally nude spectator sports should be banned	Carol Ruddell	Claire Berstein		30196	31 March 1982
Marijuana should be legalized	Edmond Brown	Dr Andrew Malcolm		30197	31 March 1982
Surrogate motherhood should be a right	Jerald Bain	Dr Suzanne Scorsone		30198	24 October 1982
Fear of crime is media induced	Barrie Zwicker	McKenzie Porter		30199	26 October 1982
Faith healing is a hoax	Dr Howard Seiden	Tom Harpur		30200	26 October 1982
Modern medicine is too expensive	Dr Harding Le Riche	Dr Mark Baltzan		30201	27 October 1982
The American political system is superior to the Canadian system	Charles Templeton	William Kilbourn		30202	27 October 1982
Lawyers should be allowed to advertise				30203	27 October 1982
Doctors should have the right to harvest transplant organs	Dr John Dossetor	Prof William Harvey		30204	2 November 1982
Canada does not need the Guardian Angels	William McCormack	Lisa Sliwa		30205	2 November 1982
The Western world should arm space	Nicholas Stethem	Prof John Polanyi		30206	2 November 1982
We should revive the failure system in schools	Mark Holmes	Don Rutledge		30207	3 November 1982
Canada should prosecute war criminals	Irwin Cotler	Harold Levy		30208	3 November 1982
National security takes precedence over personal privacy	John Starnes	Alan Borovoy		30210	3 November 1982
Canada should abandon multiculturalism	Richard J. Needham	James Fleming		30211	18 January 1983
Children's aid societies have too much power	Cyril Greenland	George Caldwell		30212	18 January 1983
Corporate bailouts bankrupt the economy	Jack Carr	James Gillies		30213	18 January 1983
Criminals should not profit from their pens	Kildare Dobbs	George Jonas		30214	19 January 1983
Violence is a viable political weapon	Desmond Ellis	Murray Thomson		30215	19 January 1983
The peace movement is a subversive force	Lubor J. Zink	Clarke MacDonald		30216	19 January 1983
God is not omnipotent	Russel Legge	James Olthuis		30217	25 January 1983
Homosexuals should be allowed to adopt children	John Lee	Blair Shaw		30219	25 January 1983
The arts must be subsidized	Lister Sinclair	Maryon Kantaroff		30220	25 January 1983
Everyone has a right to a job	Bob Rae	Dr John Crispo		30222	26 January 1983

== Reception ==
During its initial month, The Great Debate gained a 3% share of the BBM television ratings, competing unfavourably to CTV which earned a 31% share for The Streets of San Francisco. By mid-1974, the show's ratings increased to 201,000 viewers from 106,000 within a three-week span.
