= Andy Donato =

Canadian political cartoonist (1937–2026)

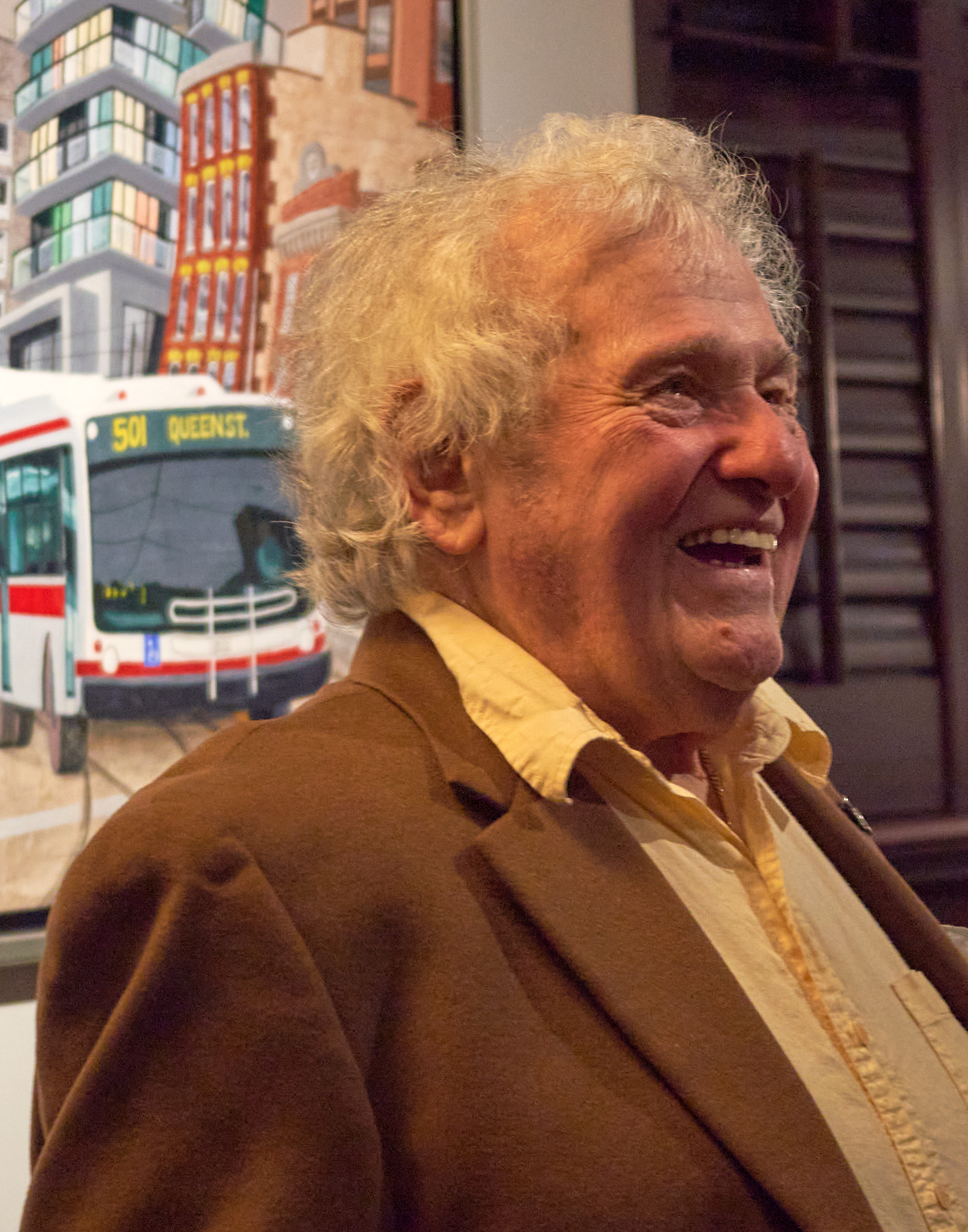
- Donato at an art showing at the University of Toronto Faculty Club
- Born: Andrea Antonio Donato; January 13, 1937; Scarborough, Ontario, Canada
- Died: September 15, 2026 (aged 89); Scarborough, Ontario, Canada
- Education: Danforth Collegiate and Technical Institute
- Known for: Editorial cartooning, landscape painting, graphic design
- Notable work: The American Dream
- Spouse: Dianne Jackson-Donato
- Children: 5
- Awards: National Newspaper Award (1976); Montreal Salon of Cartoons (1980); Italian Walk of Fame (2014); Canadian News Hall of Fame (2016); Brampton Arts Walk of Fame (2016); Scarborough Walk of Fame (2018)

Andrea Antonio Donato (January 13, 1937 – September 15, 2026), also known as Andrew Anthony Donato and known professionally as Andy Donato, was a Canadian editorial cartoonist, newspaper art director and painter. His newspaper career spanned 65 years, from joining the Toronto Telegram in 1961 until his retirement in 2026. He worked for the Toronto Sun from its establishment in 1971 until 2026, becoming closely identified with the newspaper and playing a major role in designing its original appearance.

== Life and career ==
=== Early life ===
Donato was born Andrea Antonio Donato in Scarborough, Ontario, on January 13, 1937. He also used the anglicized name Andrew Anthony Donato. His father, Luciano Donato (1897–1978), was an Italian immigrant from the town of Fardella in the southern province of Potenza, while his mother, Adelina Benedetti (1914–1993), was born in Canada. Donato worked at his father's grocery store while growing up.

He also spent much of his youth in Toronto's Little Italy, around the Bathurst and College streets area. His mother had been born in the neighbourhood, and his father and uncle had also lived there.

Donato's father immigrated to North America through New York in 1922. He worked in construction and as a pants presser at Eaton's before the family moved to Scarborough and opened a grocery store. When Donato was 13, his elementary-school principal permitted him to attend a beginner's painting class at Danforth Collegiate and Technical Institute. He graduated from the school in 1955 and began working at Eaton's as a layout artist. He also worked during the evenings for a small art studio and later opened a studio of his own. During the 1960s, he lived in Brampton, Ontario, and contributed editorial cartoons to the weekly Bramalea Guardian.

=== Toronto Telegram ===
Donato joined the Toronto Telegram in 1961 as a staff artist, initially working as a graphic artist in the promotion department. He eventually became the newspaper's art director.

He drew his first political cartoon in May 1964, during the Canadian flag debate. It appeared in the Telegram and was subsequently reproduced in the Encyclopedia Americana. He initially contributed political cartoons when the Telegram's regular cartoonist Al Beaton was absent. Wanting more opportunities to draw editorial cartoons, Donato received permission from his employers to contribute to the weekly Bramalea Guardian while continuing to work for the Telegram.

In February 1964, Donato created a weekly comic feature titled Flunko for the Telegram. It ran from February 13, 1964, until 1966, with reruns later appearing in other newspapers, including some in the United States.

Donato remained on staff at the Telegram until it ceased publication at the end of October 1971.

=== Toronto Sun ===
Following the closure of the Telegram, Donato joined the newly established Toronto Sun, which first appeared on November 1, 1971. As one of the newspaper's original employees, he helped establish its visual identity in the weeks preceding its launch. Working at his kitchen table, Donato designed the first Toronto Sun logo, front page and overall appearance. He later played a similar role in developing the appearance of other newspapers acquired by Sun Media.

Donato later recalled that the name "Sun" appeared while he was designing the paper and was influenced by the success of the British tabloid The Sun. The newspaper's founders retained the name after failing to settle on an alternative.

He initially produced two editorial cartoons a week, alternating with cartoonist Yardley Jones. His output increased to three cartoons a week after he joined the Sun. Following Jones's departure and the introduction of the newspaper's Sunday edition in 1973, Donato began producing five cartoons a week. He eventually became the newspaper's preeminent political cartoonist and was appointed corporate art director for Sun Media in 1993. He remained the Sun's art director until taking early retirement from that position in 1997.

Donato was known within the newspaper as "the franchise". Former colleague Jean Sonmor wrote that Donato embodied the Sun's self-image as "fun, hard-hitting, irascible and brightly original", while founding editor Peter Worthington described him as a "priceless asset" and a "cartooning genius". Reader surveys conducted by the newspaper regularly placed Donato's editorial cartoons at or near the top of its most-read features.

He became particularly well known among Sun readers for a small bird hidden in his cartoons. He first drew the bird in a tree in the early 1980s and continued including it for several weeks before stopping. After readers contacted the newspaper asking about the bird's disappearance, Donato restored it as a recurring feature. The newspaper subsequently organized a "Find Donato's Bird" contest which, according to the Sun, received two million entries. Donato said the bird may have been inspired by a white pet budgerigar named Eric that he had owned earlier in life. By 1984, the bird had become an established feature of his cartoons.

Collections of Donato's political cartoons were published in book form, including Gucci Blues (1988) and Son of a Meech (1990).

Donato took early retirement from his staff position and relinquished the art director's post in 1997, but continued producing editorial cartoons for the Sun on a freelance basis until September 2026.

=== Editorial cartoons and controversies ===
Donato frequently caricatured Canadian and international political figures. Among his favourite subjects were prime ministers Pierre Trudeau and Brian Mulroney. Donato later recalled that although the Sun strongly opposed Trudeau, he believed some of his cartoons of Mulroney had been even harsher. Mulroney nevertheless admired his work and acquired several original Donato cartoons for display in his offices.

He said that politicians with distinctive physical features were generally easier to caricature. Among those he cited were Mulroney, John Diefenbaker, Trudeau and Robert Stanfield, while he regarded politicians such as John Turner, Ernie Eves, David Peterson and Stephen Harper as more difficult subjects.

One of Donato's best-known cartoons, titled The American Dream, was published during the Iran hostage crisis. It parodied the photograph Raising the Flag on Iwo Jima, depicting American servicemen raising the United States flag over a prostrate Ruhollah Khomeini. Donato identified it as one of his favourite cartoons, and it received international recognition during the hostage crisis. Donato said the cartoon won an international award for best editorial cartoon and attracted enough attention that he subsequently produced a colour version that appeared on the Sun's front page.

Donato generally had considerable editorial freedom at the Sun. Founding publisher Doug Creighton later recalled rejecting only two of Donato's cartoons during their decades of working together. Donato subsequently sold the two rejected originals at a charity auction for $1,000 each.

His work periodically generated controversy. A cartoon criticizing Hamilton voters following the re-election of Liberal MP Sheila Copps led Hamilton City Council to consider seeking an apology from him. Another cartoon criticizing owners of pit bulls also prompted complaints.

During the 1980 Toronto municipal election, Donato's cartoons were among the Toronto Sun's coverage of mayor John Sewell and openly gay council candidate George Hislop. Historian Jamie Bradburn described the campaign as marked by an "explosion of homophobia" and cited Donato's cartoons, along with the newspaper's editorials and columns, as part of the anti-gay coverage surrounding the election.

Donato was criticized in 2004 when his cartoon comparing David Miller with Adolf Hitler was published after Miller refused to allow a debate on Chief Julian Fantino's contract renewal. In 2014, a Donato cartoon depicting politician Olivia Chow in a Mao suit was criticized as racist. The newspaper issued an apology "to Olivia Chow and anyone else offended by the cartoon."

=== Personal life ===
Donato was married to Dianne Jackson-Donato, an artist and former Toronto Sun employee. He had five children. Golf was one of his principal interests outside art and remained a lifelong passion.

=== Retirement and death ===
Donato retired from editorial cartooning in September 2026, ending a newspaper career that had begun 65 years earlier at the Toronto Telegram. His final cartoon for the Sun, published on September 6, 2026, was a farewell to readers after 55 years with the newspaper. It featured his recurring bird character beneath the words "That's all folks", accompanied by a message thanking readers for sharing the space with him. Donato said shortly before retiring that he intended to take several weeks off before deciding what to do next and planned to devote more time to painting. After his death, Donato's cousin Phil Nero said that Donato had originally submitted a cartoon intended for publication on September 6 depicting Donald Trump with a hand grenade in his mouth while throwing away its detached safety pin. According to Nero, the newspaper had told Donato he was submitting too man Trump cartoons and considered the image too violent and requested a replacement, after which Donato submitted his "That's all folks" farewell cartoon.

Donato died of a heart attack while golfing at the Toronto Hunt Club on September 15, 2026, at the age of 89, ten days after the publication of his final cartoon.

=== Tax dispute ===
Donato had a dispute with the Canada Revenue Agency over the manner in which he donated some of his works to certain educational institutions in 1999 and 2001. He was partially successful in his appeal to the Tax Court of Canada, and was awarded costs in the case. The judgment was sustained on appeal to the Federal Court of Appeal.

=== Painting ===
Donato was also a landscape artist who worked in a style he called "bent realism". His paintings mostly depicted urban landscapes, particularly Toronto neighbourhoods. He also produced sports art, including works depicting hockey. By 2014, he was working on a children's book. His first art exhibition was held in 1968, and his work was subsequently exhibited in Canada and internationally. His paintings were shown at Harbour Gallery in Mississauga, as well as at exhibitions in New York, London and Johannesburg, South Africa.

== Awards and recognition ==
Donato received the National Newspaper Award for editorial cartooning in 1976. In 1980, he won the Montreal Salon of Cartoons award for best editorial cartoon in the world. He served as president of both the Association of American Editorial Cartoonists and the Association of Canadian Editorial Cartoonists.

Donato's cartoons were sought by some of the politicians they depicted, including prime ministers and provincial premiers, who requested original drawings even when his depictions of them had been critical.

He was inducted into the Italian Walk of Fame in Toronto in 2014. In 2016, he was inducted into the Brampton Arts Walk of Fame. Later that year, Donato and journalist John Fraser were inducted into the Canadian News Hall of Fame. In 2018, Donato was inducted into the Scarborough Walk of Fame at Scarborough Town Centre, becoming his third induction into a walk of fame.
