= McKenzie Porter =

British-born Canadian journalist and newspaper columnist (1911–2006)

- Born: John McKenzie Porter; 21 October 1911; Accrington, Lancashire, England
- Died: 21 October 2006 (aged 95); Toronto, Ontario, Canada
- Resting place: Mount Pleasant Cemetery, Toronto
- Occupations: Journalist; columnist; author; critic
- Spouse: Kathleen Elizabeth Gathercole (m. 1936; died 1985)
- Children: 1
- Awards: Military Cross
- Military career
- Allegiance: United Kingdom
- Branch: British Army
- Service years: 1939–1945
- Rank: Major
- Units: London Irish Rifles; Cameronians (Scottish Rifles)
- Campaigns: North African campaign; Syria–Lebanon campaign; Italian campaign (World War II); Battle of Monte Cassino
- Awards: Military Cross

John McKenzie Porter MC (21 October 1911 – 21 October 2006), known professionally as McKenzie Porter, was a British-born Canadian journalist, columnist, author and critic. After beginning his career on British newspapers during the 1930s, he served as an infantry officer during the Second World War and was awarded the Military Cross. He emigrated to Canada in 1948 and wrote for Maclean's before joining the Toronto Telegram in 1962. Following the Telegram's closure in 1971, he became one of the founding columnists of the Toronto Sun, where he remained until his retirement in 1990.

Porter was known for an ornate literary style, irreverent humour, and deliberately provocative opinions. His columns addressed politics, social customs, history, travel, food and the arts. Admirers regarded him as a gifted stylist and satirist, while critics objected to his views on race, immigration, feminism and other social issues.

== Early life and British journalism ==
Porter was born on 21 October 1911 in Accrington, Lancashire, England, into a mercantile family. He later attributed his interest in journalism to meeting a reporter who boarded at his family's home.

He began his career as a cub reporter for the Manchester Evening Chronicle, where he worked for approximately two years. He subsequently joined the northern edition of the Daily Express, reporting on the early rise of Adolf Hitler and the Spanish Civil War.

He later moved to London's Fleet Street and joined the Daily Mirror. At the age of 25, he became the newspaper's news editor, supervising approximately 75 reporters. During his tenure, the Mirror was the first British newspaper to break the story of King Edward VIII's relationship with Wallis Simpson, which ultimately led to the abdication crisis. Porter later said that his rapid professional advancement had spoiled him early in his career.

After a disagreement with an editor, Porter moved to the Beaverbrook-owned Evening Standard as a film critic. His tenure there ended following a dispute over the newspaper's approach to film reviews and the tastes of its proprietor, Lord Beaverbrook. Porter afterwards wrote briefly for the Daily Sketch before the outbreak of the Second World War.

== Military service ==
At the beginning of the Second World War, Porter enlisted in the British Army as a private rather than seeking a safer and better-paid position in military public relations. He initially served as a rifleman in the London Irish Rifles and later received a commission.

Porter subsequently served with the Cameronians in Egypt, Syria, Lebanon, and Italy. In 1943, he led an assault against a German position in Calabria. He was later wounded four times during the Battle of Monte Cassino and was awarded the Military Cross, which he received from King George VI. He completed his military service with the rank of major.

After the war, Porter worked as the Paris correspondent for Kemsley Newspapers from 1946 to 1948. During this period, he worked under Ian Fleming, whom Porter later assessed dismissively as a journalist.

== Canadian career ==
Porter emigrated to Canada in 1948, reportedly motivated in part by dissatisfaction with postwar rationing in Britain. He later joked that the availability of meat was one reason he had chosen Canada; according to his obituary, the remark inspired a long-running advertising slogan, "It's mainly because of the meat", for the Dominion supermarket chain.

Soon after immigrating to Canada in 1948, Porter began writing for Maclean's, where he became known for writing profiles. In 1961, Porter also wrote a biography of Prince Edward, Duke of Kent and Strathearn, the father of Queen Victoria. He remained associated with Maclean's until joining the Toronto Telegram in 1962.

At the Telegram, Porter worked as a columnist and arts critic. His writing ranged across politics, literature, architecture, history, travel, etiquette and social commentary. Publisher John Bassett occasionally declined to publish Porter's more controversial columns. According to Porter's obituary, Bassett nevertheless declined to dismiss him after the newspaper lost a libel action over one of his columns, partly because Porter was a decorated war veteran.

Porter also had a falling-out with Pierre Berton, with whom he had previously worked at Maclean's. The dispute arose after Porter exposed the "Sordsmen", a private dining club of prominent Toronto writers, publishers, businessmen and broadcasters who met for lavish lunches accompanied by women who were not their wives, and who were forbidden to attend its meetings unless their husband was not present. Porter appeared at one of the club's lunches at Toronto's Franz Josef Room with a Telegram photographer, causing diners to scatter "like frightened scandal-case witnesses" to a secret exit. His subsequent column and publication of the club's menu briefly made the group the subject of public gossip.

Berton and members of the club's inner circle, including June Callwood, Farley Mowat, Charles Templeton, Lister Sinclair, Elsa Franklin and Fred Davis, closed ranks around the club, refusing to discuss it publicly while privately ridiculing Porter. Berton later described Porter as "an oddball Englishman ... the master of the low-profile character sketch ... a self-declared snob".

When the Toronto Telegram closed in October 1971, Porter joined former employees who established the Toronto Sun. The new tabloid published its first issue on 1 November 1971 under publisher Douglas Creighton and editor Peter Worthington. Porter became one of its original columnists and remained with the newspaper for 19 years.

Porter's columns at the Sun combined social and political commentary with writing about food, travel, language, manners, history and British traditions. He cultivated the persona of an outspoken English traditionalist and frequently employed exaggeration and satire. His son Timothy described him as a verbal cartoonist who directed much of his ridicule at people he considered pretentious or powerful.

Former Sun editor Peter Worthington described Porter as "the most graceful and stylish writer in the business", while observing that readers could not always determine whether he was expressing a sincere belief or writing for provocative effect. Journalist June Callwood, who had known Porter during their work for Maclean's, recalled that his public pomposity and social prejudices appeared at least partly calculated, and described him privately as charming and generous.

=== "Body Hygiene" column ===
One of Porter's best-known columns, "Body Hygiene", was published in the Sun on 12 November 1976. In it, he condemned men who read newspapers or defecated in workplace washrooms, writing that the practice was "not merely a theft of one's employer's time but, often, an offence to the eyes, ears and nose of one's colleagues". The piece reflected the exaggerated standards of etiquette and personal cleanliness that Porter often prescribed in his columns, sometimes after colleagues deliberately provoked him about habits he disliked. The column generated enough reader response to fill the Sun's letters page for much of the following week. The newspaper also published a staged photograph of Porter, dressed in a suit and reading the Sun while seated on a toilet. National Lampoon later republished the column in its March 1977 issue.

=== Support for eugenics ===
Porter repeatedly advocated eugenics as a response to poverty, disability, and crime. In an October 1982 column, he argued for the sterilization of people he regarded as genetically unfit, including some people receiving public assistance and repeat offenders. He proposed that boards composed of doctors, lawyers, psychiatrists, and clergy be empowered to order sterilizations and suggested that an element of compulsion would be necessary.

=== 1985 South Africa controversy ===
In July 1985, Porter published a column on political violence in South Africa in which he opposed extending voting rights to the country's Black majority and compared Black South Africans with Black Americans in terms of intelligence, emotional stability and cultural interests. He also criticized anti-apartheid leader Desmond Tutu. Historian Jamie Bradburn characterized the column as part of Porter's recurring defence of apartheid-era white rule.

The column, together with a related Toronto Sun editorial, prompted complaints from the Anti-Apartheid Coalition of Toronto and became part of a wider dispute between the newspaper, Toronto's mayor's committee on community and race relations and community organizations concerning racism, freedom of expression and a proposal that the City of Toronto withdraw its advertising from the newspaper.

Sun publisher Paul Godfrey maintained that the newspaper opposed apartheid but defended Porter's right to express opinions with which the publisher did not necessarily agree. Porter responded to the dispute in a subsequent column by comparing the committee's actions to the Spanish Inquisition and criticizing multiculturalism and some of the committee's supporters.

In March 1986, the Ontario Press Council dismissed a complaint alleging that the editorial and Porter's column promoted racism or wilfully spread hatred against Black people. The council upheld the newspaper's right to publish opinion while emphasizing that publication did not necessarily imply endorsement by the newspaper itself.

=== 1989 column on immigration and voting rights ===
In February 1989, Porter wrote a Toronto Sun column arguing that Italian Canadians were using methods "alien to British practice" to gain political power and that foreign-born Canadian citizens should therefore be barred from voting or standing for public office.

Metropolitan Toronto Council demanded apologies from Porter and the Sun and agreed to reconsider withholding its advertising if none was received. Councillors also discussed filing complaints with the Ontario Press Council and the Ontario Human Rights Commission. Sun editor John Downing said that the newspaper did not agree with Porter's views but defended its columnists' freedom to publish provocative opinions.

On 24 February, Toronto City Council voted to withdraw all civic advertising from the Sun until the newspaper printed a front-page apology and reproduced the Canadian Charter of Rights and Freedoms. Councillor Jack Layton, who led the campaign, described Porter's column as profoundly offensive, while Mayor Art Eggleton opposed withdrawing the advertisements, arguing that the measure approached censorship. Godfrey rejected the demand and characterized the city's action as an attempt to pressure the press.

By April, Metropolitan Toronto Council was considering withdrawing more than $40,000 in annual advertising unless the newspaper apologized. Godfrey continued to decline to apologize, although he said that he was "very upset" by the column. The proposed sanctions were criticized by the Canadian Daily Newspaper Publishers Association as a threat to freedom of expression. Several Ontario municipalities declined to support Metro Toronto's proposed sanctions, while others endorsed them or called for an apology.

The City of Toronto's advertising ban remained in place for approximately two months before council reconsidered it amid criticism that the measure amounted to censorship. Porter was also criticized in the Legislative Assembly of Ontario over the column and retired from the Sun the following year.

== Personal life ==
Porter married Kathleen Gathercole, who died in 1985. They had one son, Timothy McKenzie Gathercole Porter, who worked as a newspaper reporter in Britain and later at the Toronto Telegram before entering public relations. McKenzie Porter had two granddaughters, Alexandra and Samantha Porter.

Outside journalism, Porter was described as an enthusiastic gardener and cook.

== Later life and death ==
Porter retired reluctantly from the Toronto Sun in 1990. He subsequently continued to write freelance travel articles, essays and commentaries, including pieces for The Globe and Mail. His later writing often drew upon his cultivated public persona and described his experiences travelling in Britain, Europe and Asia.

He died of natural causes in Toronto on 21 October 2006, his 95th birthday. He was cremated and his remains were interred in a niche at Mount Pleasant Cemetery, Toronto.

== Published works ==
- To All Men: The Story of the Canadian Red Cross. Toronto: McClelland & Stewart, 1960.
- Overture to Victoria. Toronto: Longmans, Green, 1961. A biography of Prince Edward, Duke of Kent and Strathearn.
- Julie: The Royal Mistress. Toronto: Gage Publishing, 1975.
