= Ken Walker (physician) =

Canadian medical writer and gynecologist (1924–2025)

- Born: Kenneth Francis Walker; 28 February 1924; Croydon, England
- Died: 1 July 2025 (aged 101)
- Other names: W. Gifford-Jones, M.D. (pen name)
- Education: Harvard Medical School
- Occupations: Medical writer; celebrity doctor
- Spouse: Susan Walker (m. 1956)
- Children: 4, including Diana MacKay (Diana Gifford-Jones)
- Medical career
- Sub-specialties: Obstetrician; gynaecologist

Kenneth Francis Walker (28 February 1924 – 1 July 2025) was a Canadian medical writer, celebrity doctor, obstetrician, gynecologist and abortion practitioner. As an author and columnist, he published under the pen name W. Gifford-Jones, M.D.

== Background ==
Walker was born in 1924 in Croydon, England to Walter and Annie Walker. His family moved to Canada when he was 3 years old, first settling in Montreal and then in Niagara Falls, Ontario.

Walker earned his undergraduate degree from the University of Toronto and graduated from Harvard Medical School in 1950.

He received his surgical training at the University of Rochester and McGill University as well as Harvard Medical School. Early in his career he was variously a family doctor, hotel doctor at the Manoir Richelieu Hotel at Murray Bay, Quebec, and ship’s surgeon. On his first Atlantic crossing he relieved the captain of his command due to illness.

He then established a practice as gynecological surgeon in Niagara Falls and was appointed to the staff at Toronto Western Hospital and Toronto General Hospital.

== Author and columnist ==
Walker adopted the Gifford-Jones pseudonym when he wrote his first book in 1961, Hysterectomy: A Book for the Patient, due to the College of Physicians and Surgeons which ruled he could not publish a medical book under his own name as this would constitute advertising for patients and was not permitted under the college's rules. He is the author of a total of ten books, all written under the Gifford-Jones pen name, the last being published in 2024 when he was 100 years old.

As W. Gifford-Jones, MD, he launched his column "The Doctor Game" in the Globe and Mail in 1975. It was syndicated to over 40 newspapers by the end of the 1970s.

The column appeared in the Globe and Mail until 1989 when it moved to the Toronto Sun. At its peak it was syndicated to over 85 newspapers in Canada, 300 newspapers in the United States, including the Chicago Sun-Times, and newspapers in Europe. He also wrote ten books, was a senior editor of Canadian Doctor magazine, and a regular contributor to Fifty Plus magazine.

The Postmedia chain, including the Toronto Sun ceased carrying the Gifford-Jones column at the end of 2019.

In his last years, the column was published online and in smaller newspapers such as the Westerly Sun, the Kingsville Times, the Penticton Herald, and the Prince Albert Daily Herald

Walker continued to contribute a weekly column until his death, claiming never to have missed a week in fifty years. From 2020 until his death in 2025, he co-authored the column with his daughter, Diana MacKay who used the pen name Diana Gifford-Jones. She continued as sole author of the weekly column after his death.

== Campaigns and advocacy ==
While practicing in Niagara Falls, Ontario, Walker was an advocate of women's right to choose abortion and was an abortion practitioner in the area after the procedure became legal in 1969, resulting in death threats from abortion opponents.

In 1979, he began campaigning for the legalization of heroin as a painkiller for terminal cancer patients through his column, by creating the Gifford-Jones Foundation to raise money for the campaign and through newspaper advertisements and collecting 30,000 names on a petition and soliciting 20,000 letters from his readers in support of his efforts. His foundation donated $500,000 to the University of Toronto Medical School to establish the Gifford-Jones Professorship in Pain Control and Palliative Care.

Walker also advocated the right to assisted suicide and euthanasia and was a member of the physicians advisory council of Dying with Dignity Canada.

== Medical views and criticisms ==
=== Alternative medicine ===
When he was 74, Walker suffered a serious heart attack and soon after had a triple bypass operation. He rejected the recommended statin therapy and recalling an interview he had with Linus Pauling advocating Vitamin C megadosage, began a regimen of 10 grams of Vitamin C and 5 grams of the amino acid lysine, which he claimed saved his life. Walker's advocacy of a combination of large dosages of Vitamin C and lysine to prevent or reverse coronary disease and his questioning of the use of statins has been criticized by medical professionals and also led to accusations that Walker's advocacy of this and other alternative treatments puts him in a conflict of interest as he sells vitamin supplements online, including a product that combines Vitamin C and lysine. Dr. Raphael Cheung, an endocrinologist at Windsor Regional Hospital, wrote in an op-ed response to Walker's advice that: “Dr. Gifford-Jones’ anecdotal experience belongs to medicine that was practiced half a century ago!” adding "Why does [the Windsor Star] keep printing articles written by a retired OB-GYN regarding vascular health? Not knowing any better, there are patients who are at high risk for heart disease and stroke in our community who have stopped taking their medications after reading Gifford-Jones articles." Cheung also stated that he was surprised when a patient with coronary heart disease told him that he had stopped his heart medications and "had started taking Dr. Gifford-Jones’s Medi-C Plus treatment purchased online.”

=== Views on vaccination ===
In 2018, the Toronto Sun pulled a Gifford-Jones column from its website following an outcry over its urging readers to consider "both sides of the vaccine debate". Sun editor Adrienne Batra said it was removed from the newspaper's website after medical professionals pointed out inaccuracies in the column. His public advocacy for understanding both the benefits and risks of vaccines dates back to 1974, when he published two articles about the swine flu epidemic taking place that year. In 2021, Gifford-Jones came down in favour of the COVID-19 vaccine, writing "I have never been against vaccination and proven science" and in regards towards COVID-19 vaccines "the risk is so, so minimal versus the risk of dying unvaccinated".

== Views on apartheid South Africa ==
In 1986, Walker participated in a "fact finding" tour of South Africa sponsored by the apartheid government. Upon his return he wrote an op-ed in the Globe and Mail titled "The good side of white South Africa" which opposed sanctions against or disinvestment from South Africa and also opposed the prospect of ending white minority rule in the country.

== Later life and death ==
After spending much of his life in Niagara Falls, Walker and his wife moved to Toronto's Harbourfront neighbourhood where they celebrated their 60th anniversary in 2016. Walker retired from his practice at the age of 87. As of 2024, the couple lived in a retirement home in Toronto.

He turned 100 on 28 February 2024. The city of Niagara Falls, Ontario, declared the day Dr. W. Gifford-Jones Day and staged a special illumination of Niagara Falls in his honour.

At the age of 100, he published Healthy Retirement Residence Living: What Does Gifford-Jones Say? (2024) which he announced would be his "final book".

Walker died on 1 July 2025, at the age of 101. He was cremated at his own request. In 2018, he wrote: "My family knows I want a simple bench along the waterfront in Toronto where people can relax and enjoy the view. My ashes beneath can help the trees grow."

== Bibliography ==
- Healthy Retirement Residence Living: What Does Gifford-Jones Say?, 2024, self-published
- 90+ How I Got There! by W. Gifford-Jones, M.D., 2015, ActNatural
- What I Learned as a Medical Journalist: a collection of columns by W. Gifford-Jones, M.D., 2013, ActNatural
- You’re Going to do What?: The Memoir of Dr. W. Gifford-Jones by W. Gifford-Jones, M.D., 2000, ECW Press
- The Healthy Barmaid by W. Gifford-Jones, M.D., 1995, ECW Press
- Medical Survival by W. Gifford-Jones, M.D., 1985, Methuen
- What Every Woman Should Know About Hysterectomy by W. Gifford-Jones, M.D., 1977, Funk & Wagnalls, New York
- The Doctor Game by W. Gifford-Jones, M.D., 1975, McClelland & Stewart
- On Being A Woman – The Modern Woman’s Guide to Gynecology by W. Gifford-Jones, M.D., 1969, Macmillian, Book-of-the-Month Club selection (Canada and U.S.)
- Hysterectomy? – A Book for the Patient by W. Gifford-Jones, M.D., 1961, University of Toronto Press
