= Danielle Crittenden =

Canadian-American author and journalist

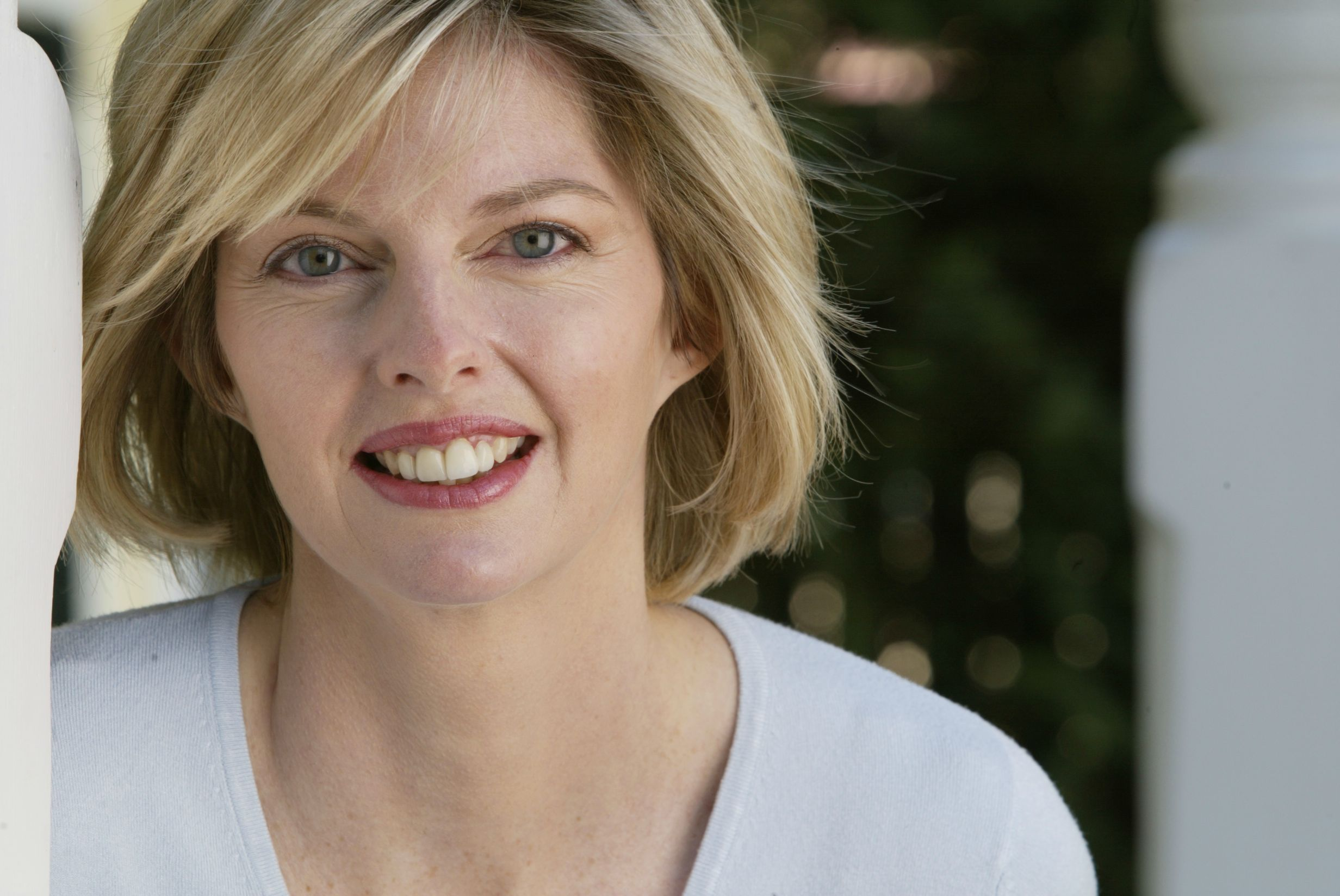
- Born: April 20, 1963 (age 63); Toronto, Ontario, Canada
- Spouse: David Frum
- Parents: Max Crittenden (father); Yvonne Crittenden (mother)
- Family: Peter Worthington (stepfather)

Danielle Crittenden (born April 20, 1963) is a Canadian-American author and journalist.

== Career ==
Danielle Crittenden was born in Toronto, Ontario, the daughter of Max Crittenden (a former editor with the Toronto Telegram) and Yvonne Crittenden (a journalist and book critic). Her stepfather was journalist Peter Worthington.

Danielle graduated in 1981 from Northern Secondary School in Toronto. She did not attend university. She became a full-time general assignment reporter and feature writer at the Toronto Sun, where she worked until 1984. She then traveled as a freelance journalist for magazines and newspapers. She married David Frum in 1988, and the couple moved to New York City, and later to Washington, D.C.. David and Danielle Frum had a daughter, Miranda Frum, who would later die from complications of a brain tumor in 2024, at the age of 32.

Danielle Frum went through the process of converting to Judaism in the late 1980s to early 1990s.

== Works ==
- What Our Mothers Didn't Tell Us: Why Happiness Eludes the Modern Woman, (Simon and Schuster, 1999)
- Amanda Bright@Home, (Warner Books 2003)
- The President's Secret IMs, (Simon Spotlight Entertainment 2007), ISBN 978-1-4169-4749-3
- From a Polish Country House Kitchen with Anne Applebaum, (Chronicle Books, 2012) ISBN 978-1452110554
- Dispatches From Grief: A Mother’s Journey Through the Unthinkable (Infinite Books, 2026)
