= Henry Gordon (magician) =

Canadian author, journalist, magician and skeptic

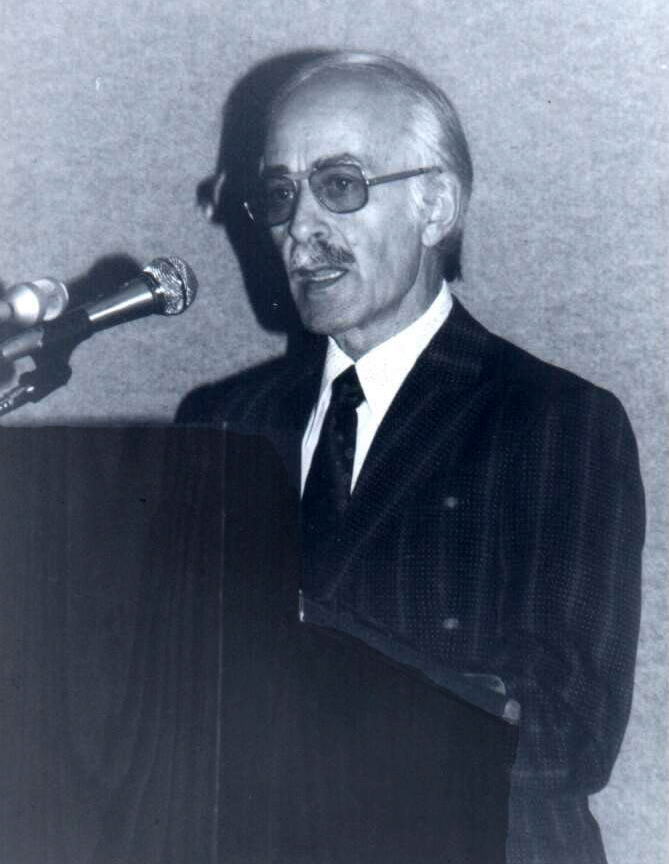
- Speaking at a CFI Conference - late 1990s
- Born: March 19, 1919; Montreal, Quebec
- Died: January 24, 2009 (aged 89); Toronto
- Occupations: Magician, mentalist, author, journalist
- Notable work: Extrasensory Deception: ESP, Psychics, Shirley MacLaine, Ghosts, UFOs. (1988). Macmillan of Canada.
- Spouse: Zita

Henry Gordon (March 19, 1919 – January 24, 2009) was a Canadian author, journalist, magician and skeptic. He was the founder of the Ontario Skeptics and a fellow of the Committee for Skeptical Inquiry (CSI).

== Early life ==
Gordon according to his wife Zita was a self-taught mechanic and very interested in radio repair. In 1940 when he was twenty, while walking down the street in Montreal Gordon spotted an advertisement for radio operators for the Royal Canadian Air Force. He enlisted and helped start an air training camp in western Canada. He was discharged from the service in December 1941 and opened up what might have been the first public recording studio in Montreal. In the 1960s, Gordon opened up what was the first party supply store in Montreal. Henry Gordon's Party Centre whose motto was "Everything for enjoyment under one roof". The store was open for nineteen years.

== Magic career ==
Gordon's interest in magic came because he wandered into a bookstore in Winnipeg in 1940. Bored, he picked up a book on coin magic, he later said it was,"a terrible book ... but it passed the time"'. By the 1950s Gordon was performing at banquets and for servicemen. He said he performed for '"every hospital and old folks home in Montreal"'. He joined the International Brotherhood of Magicians soon after.

Gordon penned a column called "It's Magic" for Starship, the children's page of the Toronto Star, in which he explained the secrets of stage tricks. "He knew his magic so well, and was such a capable writer, that kids could actually do the tricks." former Starship editor John Robinson said. The phrase "Kemo Kimo Merinickel Pumpernickel" was created by Gordon as an incantation for his magic. According to his wife Zita, Gordon fell in love with the "art and psychology" of magic, and found it relaxing. In the 1950s, Gordon opened up a party store which for nineteen years included a school for magic. He "always referred to magic as a fine art and to himself as an honest fraud". Gordon felt that scientists were the easiest to fool '"because scientists work by rational, logical rules and the use of deception breaks all the rules - it's as simple as that"'.

By 1965, Gordon began to move toward mentalism. At first he did not use a disclaimer and allowed his audience to decide if he was psychic or not. But over time he started to see that people were taking his act seriously and this concerned him as at this same time he discovered some magicians were using old vaudeville tricks and passing themselves off as psychic. Even after telling people that he was using tricks, some people still thought Gordon was a psychic but hiding his true abilities. This was frustrating for Gordon as he felt he was in a dilemma.

In the 1970s, Gordon and his wife were booked as a magician act for the Holland America Lines cruise ships, he said of this time '"It proved to be very successful, particularly when sailing through the Bermuda Triangle"' especially when he was able to do lectures on debunking pseudoscience.

Upon Gordon's death, a broken wand ceremony was carried out by Ron Guttman, past president of the Sid Lorraine Hat and Rabbit Club, the Toronto branch of the International Brotherhood of Magicians (IBM). The broken wand symbolizes broken hearts at Henry's absence. It also represents the fact that a wand without its magician is of no use. "We send Henry into the mystery of all mysteries", said Guttman, concluding the ceremony. The club had awarded Henry an Order of Merlin, which recognizes a member's service of over twenty-five years to IBM.

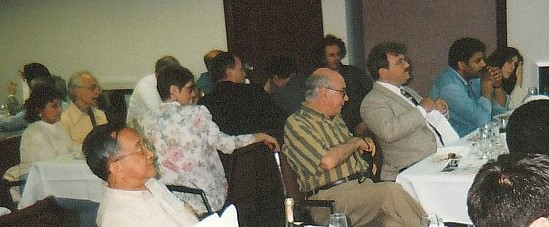
Henry Gordon (yellow shirt) with wife Zita, Eli Shneour (striped shirt), astronomer James McGaha and Neil deGrasse Tyson at 1996 CSICOP conference

== Skeptic ==
Gordon had been interested in claims of the paranormal since the late 1940s and read every book he could find on ghosts, ESP, UFO's and astrology. Gordon wasn't so sure about UFO's and thought maybe there was some possibility they existed, but then in 1952 he read Martin Gardner's book In the Name of Science later to be published as Fads and Fallacies. The next influential book sealed Gordon's fate as a skeptic was D.H. Rawcliffe's The Psychology of the Occult.

His first experience speaking as a debunker on mainstream media was an interview on the evening news for the Canadian Broadcasting Corporation (CBC) on November 1, 1960. He was interviewed by a young Peter Jennings. Gordon explains that he was given this opportunity because he had done a thirteen-week series on magic for the CBC and had all the necessary paperwork in order. In 1966 he was interviewed by the CBC show Seven on Six and given seven minutes. Finally in 1969, the media was beginning to become very interested in the paranormal which meant Gordon was receiving more appearances, he was interviewed on the CBC show The Occult and in 1975, on the CTV network for Canada AM. In 1977 he was given a thirteen-week program on the CBC called Morningside.

Gordon says that up until 1978 he felt like the lone skeptic, he was unaware of other like-minded people who shared his passion for debunking the paranormal. In 1978 he was asked to be a speaker at a symposium at Concordia University where he met fellow speakers Paul Kurtz and Ray Hyman. Gordon says that CSICOP "opened new worlds for me". He was first appointed a Scientific and Technical Consultant and they set up CSICOP Canada. The group existed for two years before smaller skeptical groups started springing up around the world.

Gordon became the founder and first chair of the Ontario Skeptics, a precursor to Skeptics Canada. He was also a fellow of the Committee for Skeptical Inquiry (CSI), and was well known for his debunking of the claims of self-proclaimed psychics such as Peter Hurkos Gordon also participated as a debunker on numerous radio and television shows in both Canada and the United States, including The Great Debate, People Are Talking, Larry King Live and The Oprah Winfrey Show, and taught a course called "An Objective Inquiry into Psychic Phenomena" at McGill University from 1979 to 1981.

We're going to talk about ghosts today, and here is Henry Gordon who has come to spoil our day again. (Introduction on CBC's Radio Noon program)

Paranormal propondent Allen Spraggett offered Gordon $100 on CBC's Morningside if he could do a trick that he (Spraggett) could not explain. Gordon pulled out three small sponge balls from his pocket and turned them into 16 balls. Spraggett could not figure out the trick, and Gordon replied that he invents his own tricks, and that "Just because something can't be explained doesn't mean there's some psychic gobbledygook at work".

Gordon's first debunking column appeared in the weekly Montreal newspaper The Suburban (the first such column of its kind in North America), and then, after moving to Toronto, Gordon wrote the debunking column "Extrasensory Deception" for two years for the Toronto Sun, and wrote the regular column "Debunking" for the Toronto Star's Sunday paper for more than twenty years. According to the Toronto Star editor, Gerry Hall, "Henry turned his critical eye to everything from UFO sightings to psychic detectives and chiropractors". Many of Gordon's columns were published in his book Extrasensory Deception: ESP, Psychics, Shirley MacLaine, Ghosts, UFOs (Macmillan of Canada, 1988). In 1992 the Committee for Skeptical Inquiry (CSICOP) presented Gordon with the Responsibility in Journalism Award.

The challenge of teaching the public to think critically was a subject Gordon talked about often. In a 1990 article for The Journal Times he told the interviewer that it felt like it was a losing battle at times, '"We're trying to combat the wave of irrationalism that is actually sweeping the continent and the world"'. He understood the need to want to believe in the paranormal, felt that people had a strong desire to want to think that there is something after death. He had investigated ghosts, psychics and other paranormal claims and always found a natural explanation. "... as long as there is doubt, people will believe the books, call the 900 numbers and watch the television specials".

[...] Gordon credits the CSICOP community for their support over the (then) twenty-five years of his association with them. Gordon writes "Watching the construction of the Center for Inquiry building was a satisfying experience. And, in my humble opinion, CSICOP's spawning of skeptical groups all around the world is its crowning achievement. CSICOP was the pioneer in organizing the battle against irrational thinking. But it is a never-ending one. Our goal in the future should be a concentrated effort to educate the average person in the use of critical thinking skills. A huge challenge - but worth pursuing".

== Uri Geller ==
In a 1975 article for The Gazette, Gordon challenged Uri Geller to a "sleight-of-hand duel". Gordon said of Geller '"The bending-of-objects act is a lot of bunk that Geller's made a big name of ... he has never tried any of his feats when magicians are present. After all, I can bend keys too".

In 1987 Gordon was asked to appear on WBZ-TV Boston with Uri Geller. Gordon warned the station that Geller would cancel if he found out that a magician was also appearing, so the station called Gordon a colominist. Geller and Gordon sat side by side on a couch with a small table in front of them. As Gordon describes it in the book Skeptical Odysseys, Geller was doing his moving the compass needle act. Geller "bent over the compass, grunting and waving his hands over it. But the needle stayed motionless. He expressed some surprise, then tried again. ... (Geller) had someone in his retinue bring in another compass ... no luck ... I suggested, '"Uri, maybe your magnet isn't strong enough." Magnet, what magnet?"' he exploded, then returned to the watches. No success there either. When we were about to go off the air he insisted on getting back to the compass. No luck ... '"I've been blocked!"' He was. The powerful magnet I had strapped above my knee under my slacks, was much stronger than his, and had already locked in the needle".

Uri Geller... might be as bent as the door keys he deforms - Henry Gordon 1975

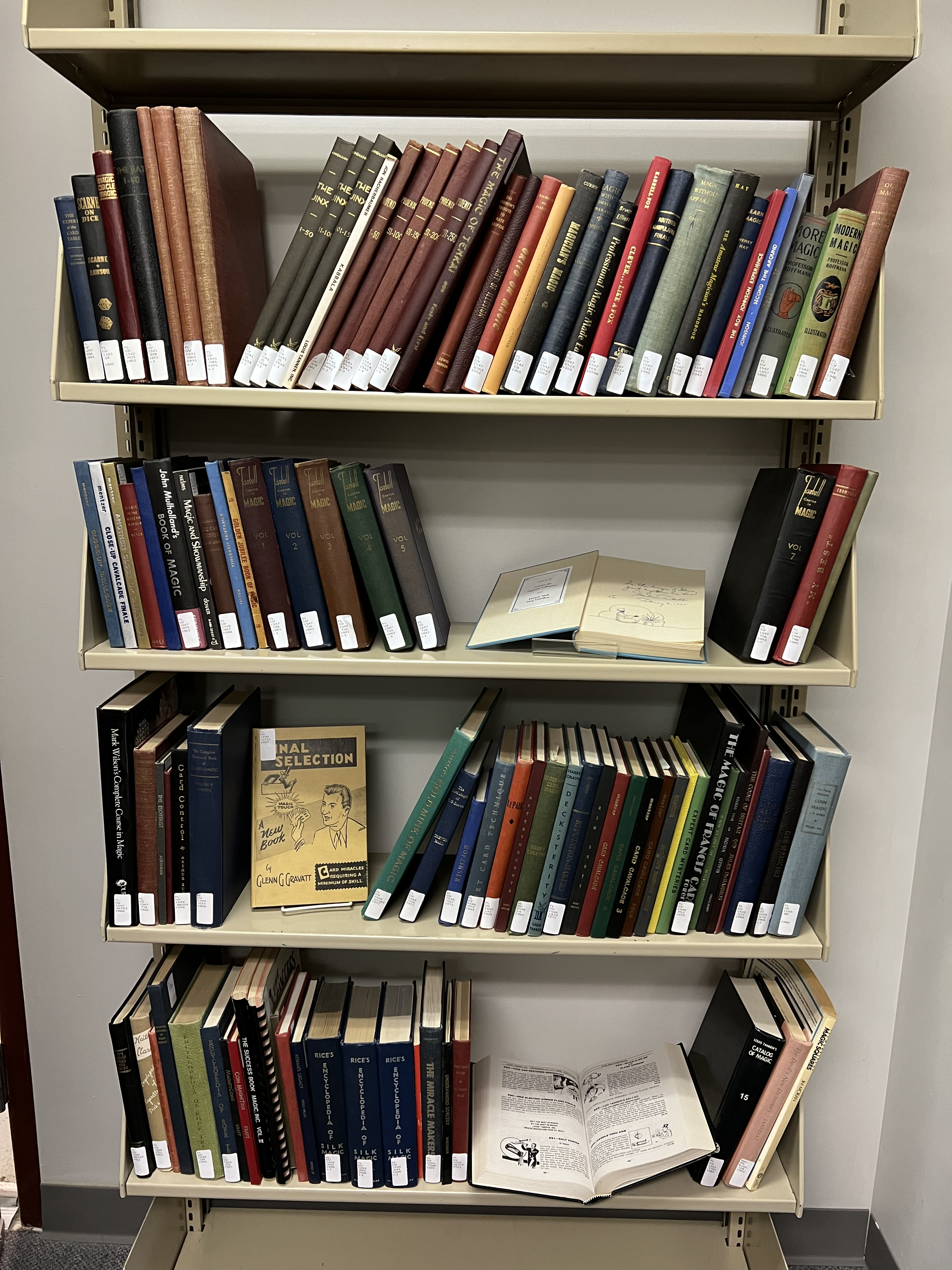
Henry Gordon book collection held at the Center for Inquiry

== Psychics ==
In 1977, for the radio morning show for CJAD, Gordon was asked to appear at a recording held at one of the local Montreal downtown restaurants as a psychic. The host Andy Barrie was himself a skeptic and magician, and between the two men they worked out that Gordon would appear in disguise as the psychic Elchonen, and Barrie would pretend Elchonen could perform miracles. Elchonen/Gordon shattered a wing glass just using psychokinesis, and the restaurant audience applauded vigorously. At the end of the show Barrie revealed that Elchonen was actually '"Henry Gordon, our well-known Montreal magician, who makes the point that you can all be taken in by this type of fakery"'.

On the CBC show As It Happens, Gordon told the story of how he visited a Ottawa psychic named Ian Bortz who was charging $75 an hour. Gordon asked Bortz to help him find his dead sister, '"It took him all of 15 seconds to make contact. He told me that she was in Belgium helping deprived children and that she was happy. The only catch is I've never had a sister"'. On CKO radio, Gordon called out Yogi Narayana who was a psychic business advisor. Narayana had predicted a local election result, Gordon told the audience '"So did my barber"'.

On a People Are Talking episode in 1988, Gordon was introduced as a psychic by the host who was "in on it". Gordon did his bit, fooled the audience and just before the "reveal" Gordon asked if he could do a reading of the host. Gordon, (still in character as a psychic) proceeded to tell the host very personal information, "one of his eyes had been affected because he had been a forceps delivery when born". The host's "jaw dropped". Gordon eventually explained to the host and the audience that he had questioned one of the assistants before coming on the show who had known the host for years personally. A common psychic technique known as Hot reading. "Of such miracles do psychics make their reputations" Gordon claimed.

Concerning psychic detectives, Gordon contacted police departments around North America and found no one who said that they had ever had a psychic solve a case. Psychic Earl Curley had claimed to have solved an Atlanta child murder case, and Gordon contacted the FBI to verify this, but was told that Curley had '"no impact on the case"'.

=== Elchonen ===
In 1977, Gordon managed to convince the manager of the Saidye Bronfman Theatre to book him as a psychic, saying that they would have a "packed house". The idea was that Gordon would be wearing a mask and when onstage use lowlights an accent and use the name Elchonen. He claimed that he needed conceal his real identity because his testing had been done under "strict secrecy" and he had to '"protect my reputation as a scientist"'. The theatre received a lot of interview requests from the media, but they knew Gordon would be recognized so they were all turned down. The theatre claimed that Elchonen had been tested in by University parapsychology labs in America and Europe and this would be his first stage performance. There were over 200 in attendance, having had to add chairs for extra attendees. Elchonen/Gordon gave a lecture and then performed "miracles" which were actually all magic tricks. One was that he made a rocking chair move from standing 10 feet away. He caused a light to blink on a potted plant proving plants had a psychic connection. He saw into sealed envelopes describing the lives of the people in the audience. According to Gordon's account, "the audience was overwhelmed. Remember, it consisted of a majority of believers who had attended the performance to reinforce their own belief systems". Elchonen walked off stage as a psychic and a few minutes later reemerged as Gordon the local magician (and psychic debunker). When Gordon went up to the microphone he asked the audience '"How many of you people believed the fraud who was just here?"' When over a third of the audience raised their hands, Gordon said '"Hundreds of thousands of people are being taken in by fakes - that's why I pulled this hoax ... I'm a magician ... and so are the psychics"'. The results from the audience were mixed, many people recognized him, some were "indignant at being taken in - others accepted it good-naturally", and others walked out. Gordon finished off the show with an ESP demonstration. Some in attendance demanded their $3 back claiming they came to see a psychic demonstration not a lecture. Gordon conceded but also said "'I'm a magician, and so are they (psychics)"'.

== Shirley MacLaine ==
Gordon began getting interested in the paranormal "side career" of Shirley MacLaine in the mid-1980s. He began by reading every one of her books "from cover to cover - not an easy thing to do. The reading, that is, not the buying". He also recorded audio and video for all the programs he could find her on. Once he had gathered all this research he wrote to Paul Kurtz who ran Prometheus Books and in 1988 was able to publish Channeling into the New Age: The "Teachings" of Shirley MacLaine and Other Such Gurus. Gordon writes that MacLaine wasn't his biggest fan and during an interview in Australia while she was on tour, she was asked about Gordon's book. She responded that he was "making a living out of criticizing her". Gordon conceded defeat after seeing her books continued to be on the New York Times best-seller list. In an interview with The Vancouver Sun, Gordon said that he had been able to interview MacLaine once, it was "like nailing Jello to the wall".

== Personal life ==
In 1941, Henry Gordon married Zita, who was then working as his magician's assistant, and the two remained married for 68 years. Henry and Zita had two children, Laura Rita and Sandra, and several grandchildren. According to his obituary, Gordon was a "Royal Canadian Air Force Veteran and radio instructor for the British Commonwealth". He was also a member of Mensa. In 1988, Gordon was asked about his religious beliefs, and stated that he is Jewish but non-practicing: "I believe in upholding the ethical values of Judaism". He said he does not believe in a personal God that can be prayed to, he stated that he is agnostic.

== Publications ==
- Extrasensory Deception: ESP, Psychics, Shirley MacLaine, Ghosts, UFOs. (1988). Macmillan of Canada. ISBN 0-7715-9539-5
- Channeling Into The New Age: The 'Teachings' of Shirley MacLaine and Other Such Gurus. (1988). Prometheus Books. ISBN 0-87975-503-2
- Henry Gordon's World of Magic. (1989). Stoddart House Books. ISBN 0773723633
- It's Magic!. (1989). Prometheus Books. ISBN 0879755458
- Henry Gordon's Magic Show. (1996). Stoddart House Books. ISBN 1895897165
- The Magic Show Book and Kit. (1999). Somerville. ISBN 1581840543

== See also ==
- Cold reading
- Mark Edward - mentalist who debunks psychics
- Hot reading
- Harry Houdini - magician turned psychic buster
- Joe Nickell CSICOP paranormal investigator and magician
