= Paul Rimstead =

Canadian journalist, columnist and broadcaster

- Born: Andrew Paul Rimstad; 1935; Sudbury, Ontario, Canada
- Died: May 26, 1987 (aged 52); Fort Lauderdale, Florida, United States
- Occupations: Journalist; columnist; sportswriter; television host; radio host
- Known for: Page 5 column in the Toronto Sun
- Spouse: Myrna Sun (m. 1986)
- Children: 1

Andrew Paul Rimstad (1935 — May 26, 1987), known professionally as Paul Rimstead, was a Canadian journalist, newspaper columnist, sportswriter and broadcaster. After working for several newspapers in Ontario, he became a sports feature writer for The Canadian magazine and a columnist for the Toronto Telegram. He was among the original editorial staff of the Toronto Sun when it was established in 1971, and became one of the newspaper's best-known personalities through his Page 5 column. He also ran for Mayor of Toronto in 1972 and worked as a television and radio host.

== Early life ==
Rimstead was born in Sudbury, Ontario, as Andrew Paul Rimstad. He was the eldest of seven children. His family moved to a farm north of Bracebridge when he was a child.

Rimstead developed an interest in journalism at an early age. At the age of 11, he produced a small local publication and reported events in the surrounding farming community, including the births of farm animals.

He had difficulty in school and left without completing his secondary education. Rimstead moved to Toronto in 1952, at the age of 16. Before establishing himself as a journalist, he held a variety of jobs, including working as a ranch hand, busboy, bank clerk and Fuller Brush salesman.

== Journalism career ==
Rimstead began his newspaper career with the North York Enterprise, launching a career that would take him to newspapers throughout Ontario before he became one of Canada's best-known newspaper columnists.

Rimstead worked for several Ontario newspapers during the early part of his career, including the Elliot Lake Standard, the Sudbury Star and as sports editor at the Kingston Whig-Standard. He also worked as a sportswriter for The Canadian Press in the early 1960s.

Although he began as a sports reporter, Rimstead became known for concentrating on the personalities and human-interest stories surrounding sporting events rather than merely reporting scores. Among his best-known feature stories was "The Goal That Death Was Watching", about hockey player Bruce Draper, who attempted to continue playing while suffering from terminal cancer.

Rimstead joined the sports department of the Toronto Daily Star in November 1963 and moved to The Globe and Mail nearly two years later. He subsequently wrote for The Canadian for four years. His concise, conversational writing style and ability to profile prominent Canadian athletes made him one of the country's better-known sportswriters during the late 1960s and early 1970s.

In 1969, Rimstead joined the Toronto Telegram as a columnist. When the Telegram ceased publication in October 1971, he became one of the former employees who helped establish the newly founded Toronto Sun. He was later sent west to assist when the newspaper established editions in Edmonton and Calgary.

At the Toronto Sun, Rimstead became one of the newspaper's signature personalities through his prominently placed Page 5 column. Although sports remained a frequent subject, he also wrote about Toronto nightlife, celebrities, politics, alcohol and his own misadventures. Recurring characters drawn from his personal life included photographer "Flashbulb Freddy" and his longtime companion Myrna, whom he called "Miss Hinky".

During his first six months at the Sun, Rimstead worked on a book about financier William Player, who was facing fraud charges, while continuing to submit two columns each week.

Colleagues remembered Rimstead as a colourful raconteur whose rumpled appearance and unconventional lifestyle complemented his writing persona. The Toronto Sun later described him as its "resident character", while the Ryerson Review of Journalism characterized him as a master storyteller.

== Politics and broadcasting ==
Rimstead ran for Mayor of Toronto in the 1972 Toronto municipal election. His candidacy was initially presented as a publicity stunt connected with his newspaper column. His campaign focused in part on what he described as the need to protect Toronto from the crime problems experienced by larger American cities. He finished fourth, receiving approximately 8,000 votes.

Rimstead was also an amateur jazz drummer and, for a time, led his own band, performing with saxophonist Jim Galloway. A 1973 review in The Globe and Mail praised his performance with Galloway.

Rimstead also worked in broadcasting, hosting television and radio talk shows and appearing in beer commercials. His first commercial was selected as one of the world's best television ads in 1974. The commercials reportedly earned him approximately $40,000. He also hosted a television program, Rimstead!, on the Global Television Network, but gave it up after the Liquor Control Board of Ontario objected to his appearing in beer advertising while he working as a television personality.

In January 1983, Rimstead began hosting Toronto Nite-Cap, a late-night radio program on Toronto station CJCL. The program aired during the station's brief period as an all-talk outlet branded "Metro 1430". Its premiere was broadcast before an audience at the Westbury Hotel and featured guests including broadcaster Knowlton Nash, performer Ronnie Hawkins and former Toronto mayor David Crombie.

== Personal life and death ==
Rimstead owned racehorses and was a regular participant in Toronto's racetrack culture. One of his horses, Annabelle, competed at several tracks and was entered in the Kentucky Derby, but was injured during a workout and did not race. Annabelle was euthanized in 1981 after being kicked by another horse.

Rimstead was married twice. In October 1986, he announced in his column that he had married his longtime companion, Myrna, after proposing to her outside the Tussauds waxwork attraction in Niagara Falls, Ontario. Former Toronto Maple Leafs player Eddie Shack served as his best man. Rimstead had one daughter, Tracey, from his first marriage.

During the final period of his career, Rimstead lived in Fort Lauderdale, Florida, while continuing to write for the Toronto Sun. He was admitted to hospital on May 11, 1987 and died there on May 26, aged 52. His death resulted from internal bleeding caused by complications of cirrhosis. He was survived by his wife Myrna, his daughter, four sisters and two brothers.

== Legacy ==
Following Rimstead's death, the Toronto Sun published Rimmer, Dammit!: The Life and Times of Canadian Legend Paul Rimstead, a posthumous collection of his writing and reminiscences. The book included an introduction by newspaper co-founder J. Douglas Creighton.

The Toronto Sun Paul Rimstead Memorial Journalism Award was subsequently established at Ryerson University in his honour. It recognized a second-year journalism student who demonstrated academic excellence and financial need. The award has since been discontinued.

== Publications ==
- Rimstead, Paul (1981). Cocktails and Jockstraps. Scarborough, Ontario: Prentice-Hall Canada. ISBN 0-13-139436-3.
- Rimstead, Paul (1987). Rimmer, Dammit!: The Life and Times of Canadian Legend Paul Rimstead. Introduction by J. Douglas Creighton. Toronto: Toronto Sun Publishing. ISBN 0-919233-32-5.
