= George Bain (journalist) =

Canadian journalist (1920–2006)

George Bain OC
- Born: George Charles Stewart Bain; January 29, 1920; Toronto, Ontario, Canada
- Died: May 14, 2006 (aged 86); Halifax, Nova Scotia, Canada
- Occupation: Journalist
- Notable credit(s): Toronto Telegram; The Globe and Mail; Toronto Star

George Charles Stewart Bain OC (January 29, 1920 – May 14, 2006) was a Canadian journalist, and the first to be named a national affairs correspondent at any Canadian newspaper. Bain was described by Allan Fotheringham as being "the wittiest columnist ever to grace Ottawa," and Doug Fisher said that Bain was "the closest to the perfect columnist" and the columnist he tried to emulate.

== Career ==
Born in Toronto, Ontario, he started with the Toronto Telegram at the age of sixteen, eventually becoming a general reporter and City Hall reporter. During World War II, he served with the Royal Canadian Air Force as a bomber pilot. After the war, in 1945, he joined The Globe and Mail as a general reporter for City Hall and Provincial Affairs in October 1945. He became a National Affairs reporter and columnist in 1952, and then served as a foreign correspondent in London (1957–1960) and Washington (1960–1964) before returning to the Ottawa bureau. From 1964 to 1969, he also appeared with Doug Fisher on Doug Fisher and ..., as well as Question Period on CJOH-TV.

Bain did not shy away from controversy in his writing. He was an early opponent of the War Measures Act when it was invoked by Pierre Trudeau as a response to the October crisis, and he later took Trudeau to task for swearing in the House of Commons and not being truthful about it afterward in what came to be known as the fuddle duddle incident. Trudeau, however, was the first to ask, "Where's Bain?" when Bain left the Globe for the Star in 1973.

In his column (which appeared five times a week in the Globe), he occasionally offered comic relief for his readers under the title of Letter from Lilac, ostensibly written by Clem Watkins, Jr. of Lilac, Saskatchewan (where the local branches of the Royal Canadian Legion and the Campaign for Nuclear Disarmament had a joint membership arrangement). He was characterized as "a rural Pepys reporting on the state of the nation." In one such letter, which was an allegory for the 1960s controversy over the unification of the Canadian Forces, Clem reported on the Lilac town council's move to unify its police, fire and ambulance services:

Also, they'll all be in the one hall. Silk Scarf says there have been anomalies and inequities between the services, like, for instance, the policemen not having a pole to slide down when they go on call. He says that when he's got them all up the pole together, like Paul Hellyer has the admirals, generals and air marshals, it's going to work wonders for morale. Just like in Ottawa.

In 1973, he joined the Toronto Star, initially as an editorial page editor, and then as European correspondent (1974–1977), and Ottawa columnist (1977–1981). In 1981, he returned to The Globe and Mail to write a weekly column (and, from 1985, a monthly column for its Report on Business Magazine) which lasted until 1987, when he left after a protracted and bitter exchange with Editor-in-Chief Norman Webster. The Globe refused to print his final column, but Doug Fisher subsequently arranged to have it appear in the Toronto Sun. In it, he said:

The eventual final parting has been in the works for some time in circumstances of extraordinary unpleasantness ... and when I sat down this morning ... ready to add another to what must be more than 3,000 columns, on this page, I found myself asking, "What in hell am I doing here?" ... I'll be seeing you around. But not here, not here.

He continued to write his "Media Watch" column for Maclean's, wine pieces for Toronto Life and enRoute, and weekly political commentary for The Chronicle Herald and The Mail-Star in Halifax, Nova Scotia.

In 1979, he became director of the School of Journalism at University of King's College. He retired in 1985, settling in Mahone Bay.

== Family life ==
In 1944, he married Marion Jene Breakey. She died in 1998. They had one son, Christopher.

== Honours ==
In 2000, he was made an Officer of the Order of Canada for having "contributed greatly to the development of journalism in Canada". He also received honorary degrees from Carleton University in 1983 and from University of King's College in 1986.

== Bibliography ==
- — (1964). I've been around and around and around. Toronto: Clarke, Irwin. OCLC 18016706.
- — (1965). Nursery rhymes to be read aloud by young parents with old children. Illustrated by Colette MacNeill. Toronto: Clarke, Irwin. OCLC 5633655., winner of the 1966 Stephen Leacock Memorial Medal for Humour
- — (1972). Canada's Parliament. Ottawa: Information Canada. OCLC 650304.
- — (1972). Champagne is for Breakfast. Toronto: New Press. ISBN 0-88770-161-2.
- — (1978). George Bain (ed.). Letters from Lilac. Illustrated by Duncan Macpherson. Toronto: Macmillan of Canada. ISBN 0-7705-1725-0.
- — (1994). Gotcha! : How the media distort the news. Toronto: Key Porter Books. ISBN 1-55013-555-4.
