= Hilary Brown =

Canadian journalist

- Born: 1941 (age 84–85)
- Occupation: Journalist

Hilary Brown is a Canadian journalist whose career spanned for almost four decades. Brown is regularly characterized as a ground-breaker, for working as a foreign correspondent and a war correspondent, when women rarely posted to dangerous locations.

Initially she covered Canadian news, for CBC News. In 1971 she made the decision to become a foreign correspondent. Over most of the next four decades she worked as a foreign correspondent and war correspondent for all three of the USA's main networks. In 2015, the New York Times explicitly named Brown's work as an inspiration for women serving as war correspondents today.

In 1975 Brown was among the last to evacuate during the fall of Saigon. She reported on how the US Navy took the extraordinary step of pushing recently arrived helicopters that had delivered desperate evacuees, off their aircraft carriers' decks, into the sea, because their hangars were full. Footage of her report of these helicopters being junked has been very widely rebroadcast, including being used in the Oscar winning film, The Deer Hunter.

== Personal life ==
Brown was married to John Bierman, a notable journalist in his own right, from the early 1970s, until his death in 2006. According to his obituary, in The Guardian, as Brown's career rose in prominence, Bierman would move to be with Brown, and find work, when she took a new foreign correspondent posting.

== Career ==
Brown spent the years 1971-73 as a freelance correspondent in the Middle East. She joined ABC News in 1973, as a foreign correspondent based in London and Paris in 1973. In 1977 went to work for NBC News as a correspondent in Tel Aviv. She returned to ABC News in 1981, but left in 1984 to join CBLT in Toronto to read the early evening news alongside Fraser Kelly. Kelly retired from journalism in 1986 and she continued to present the broadcasts on her own, until May 24, 1991, when gave up anchoring duties. In late 1992, began a third stint with ABC News, where she continue to work abroad USA, between Cyprus, London, Bosnia and the Gulf, where she covered the Iraq War. Brown finally retired in 2009.

Brown, who had known fellow Canadian Peter Jennings, from before she left Canada to become a foreign correspondent, was quoted numerous times by the authors of Peter Jennings: A Reporter's Life.

In 1995, she had described her year this way:

“New York and Switzerland in January. I was in Burma doing a documentary for Nightline in February and March. I was in Vietnam in April for the 20th anniversary of the fall of Saigon, Bosnia in May, June and again in July, Turkey in August, back in Bosnia in September, Greenland in October doing a crazy feature on the world’s first Santa Claus summit, and Mali doing a feature on stolen art in sub-Saharan Africa. Then, in December, I was in the Middle East, doing the hand-over to Palestinian self-rule. What a year, huh?"
