= Bob MacDonald (journalist) =

Canadian journalist (1929–2006)

Bob MacDonald (1929–2006) was a Toronto journalist and conservative columnist.

MacDonald was part of the team that founded The Toronto Sun newspaper after the demise of The Toronto Telegram. His scoop on government bungling was the tabloid's first front-page story on November 1, 1971.

MacDonald's and Robert Reguly's investigations of RCMP wrongdoing in the 1970s feature prominently in the newspaper's history. Eventually, this work resulted in a police search of the Sun newsroom for leaked documents (1978) and charges against Sun editor Peter Worthington under the Official Secrets Act. These were dismissed at a preliminary hearing. MacDonald was a vocal critic of the Trudeau government and of Liberal and NDP governments in Ontario. He began his career with the Halifax Chronicle-Herald in 1951, wrote for the Toronto Daily Star from 1953 to 1959 before moving to the Telegram.

MacDonald died February 26, 2006, after a 14-year battle with prostate cancer.

His daughter Moira MacDonald was The Toronto Sun's education columnist from 2000 to 2012.
