= Fraser Kelly =

Canadian journalist (c. 1934 – 2022)

Fraser Loyal Kelly (c. 1934 – January 19, 2022) was a Canadian journalist, broadcaster and corporate executive.

== Biography ==
Kelly was born and raised in Toronto. He was educated at the University of Toronto, graduating with a degree in political science and economics.

His career as a journalist began with the Toronto Telegram in 1961 where he worked as a reporter and then columnist and ultimately the newspaper's political editor until the Telegram's demise in 1971. He then joined CFTO-TV in Toronto as its political editor and host of Fraser Kelly Reports and a political affairs program "Hour Long" with co-host Isabel Bassett. He also wrote a column for the Toronto Star and contributed to various magazines.

Kelly left CFTO-TV in 1981 and joined CBLT-TV, the Canadian Broadcasting Corporation's Toronto station, where he co-hosted the nightly local news program Newshour with Valerie Elia and, later, Hilary Brown. and also hosted a public affairs show, Fraser's Edge, with Susan Ormiston.

He retired from broadcasting in 1986 to found Fraser Kelly CorpWorld, a firm which consults businesses on communications, media relations and crisis management. More recently he has sold the company, now called CorpWord, but remained with it as Senior Associate. Kelly wrote and edited three books on Canadian politics and served as adjunct professor at the Graduate School of Journalism at the University of Western Ontario.

Kelly died on January 19, 2022, at the age of 87.
