= Judith Robinson =

Canadian journalist, feminist and activist (1897–1961)

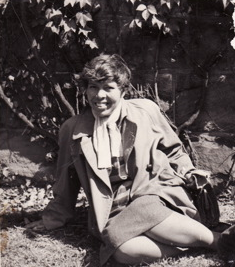
- Born: 6 April 1897; Toronto, Ontario
- Died: 17 December 1961 (aged 64); Glenora, Ontario
- Occupation: Author
- Writing career
- Period: 1928–1961
- Genre: Journalism

Judith Robinson (April 6, 1897 – December 17, 1961) was a Canadian journalist, feminist and activist. She was known as 'Brad' by family and friends. Robinson was best known as an investigative Canadian journalist during the Depression, the Second World War and until her death in 1961. Daughter of a prominent Canadian newspaperman, she went to work for The Globe of Toronto in 1928 where she became known for her journalistic focus on government accountability and social issues. She specialized in social causes, particularly pushing for help for the underprivileged, wounded veterans or victims of short-sighted bureaucracy. She was also the author of a well-known biography Tom Cullen of Baltimore (1949) about the leading Canadian gynecologist and cancer surgeon, Thomas Stephen Cullen. She died in Glenora, Ontario, in 1961.

== Biography ==
Judith Robinson was born in Toronto, Ontario, in 1897. She was the daughter of John Robinson a former editor of The Telegram. As a child, she suffered from rheumatic fever as well as typhus and gave up school at the end of grade eight, although she continued learning through wide reading, keen discussion and a practice of precise observation. After her father's death in 1928, she cut her long hair into a business-like bob and applied for a reporter's job with The Globe, on the understanding that she would not work on the society or women's pages. Consequently, she started her reporting career in the sports department. In 1932, Judith traveled to England and freelanced for The Globe at $6 a column. In 1934 she was put in charge of letters to the editor and began to write editorials. She also covered special events, and soon after was writing a daily front-page column under her own byline.

During the Depression she wrote compassionately on behalf of the unemployed and homeless, criticizing the government for its lack of concern for the poor. She was an instigator and main proponent of the drive to collect money to open the John Frank house in Toronto, which offered shelter in Toronto for those who had none.

Following the Munich Agreement, Robinson's proposed columns criticizing the policy of appeasement were routinely turned down by her editor. In response, Judith offered to take three weeks vacation to save The Globe from the need to refuse to print her bitter denunciation of Neville Chamberlain. Her offer was accepted.

At the beginning of the Second World War, as the jobless were discovering a chance to find employment in the army, a couple of new recruits burst into her office one day to thank her for her past support and, rejoicing that they now had work, presented her with a bouquet of roses. The ironic and sad column that she wrote as a result was called "Roses for Mr. Hitler".

Her attitudes and priorities can perhaps be understood by a quotation from her column in The Globe of September 12, 1939, days after war was declared, where she wrote: "Men who have already volunteered to defend freedom with their lives against the Nazi aggressor are still free to sleep in the parks in Toronto. A grateful democracy has accepted their offer and passed them as fit for service in democracy's first line of defense. It has generously agreed to pay them a dollar something a day and provide them with food and shelter as soon as it needs them. But owing to press of political business in Ottawa, it doesn’t need them quite yet."

A few months later, she fell foul of the editorial department when she criticized the government for lack of manufacturing preparedness for the war. She met with and edited writing by Col. E.J. Carter, former chief instructor of the Royal Tank School of England, which described means by which tank training should and could be given. As well, he expressed an informed opinion on which tanks could be first off the assembly lines. She wrote an article critical of the training conditions for Canadian troops at Camp Borden drilling for tank warfare by having six men holding a rope to represent the tank while the men inside the perimeter tried to prepare themselves to face the real thing.

Shortly thereafter the editor of The Globe called her in and asked if she was being fair to the paper and could she not toe the line. Judith replied, "I don't think I can. There are a lot of men dead, and a lot more going to die. We must each act according to our consciences." Accordingly, she resigned from The Globe.

In response to what she perceived as inadequate government action, she, along with associates, ran a campaign of newspaper advertisements called "Calling Canada", attacking the government for failing to supply the army with sufficient tanks, weapons and airplanes. They also criticized the government's foot-dragging on allowing British children shelter in Canada to escape from Nazi bombs.

Together with Oakley Dalgleish. Robinson began publishing a new weekly newspaper, News (May 8, 1941 to May 1946). As L.L.L. Golden wrote at the close of News in 1946: Judith founded News to help better prosecute the war. Her understanding of the issues involved in the war, her passionate belief in principles, in freedom, in the rights of little people, made the goal of the paper clear. It is not easy for a person as gentle as Judith to cut public men to pieces. According to journalist L.L.L. Golden, the publication aimed to influence public policy by applying pressure through critique. News had subscribers across Canada and in other parts of the world, but it was not well supported by advertisers and had to rely on donations from interested Canadians to keep going.

Another drive she undertook, both before and during the war, was the replacement of the overcrowded Christie Street Veterans’ Hospital' (which she described as inadequate and unworthy of veterans) with a new, more appropriate hospital. She advocated for the women's committee, which petitioned the government to build Sunnybrook Hospital for the returning veterans. (Opened 1948)

Robinson had become a regular contributor to Chatelaine when in 1953 she joined The Telegram as the Ottawa columnist for the paper's new Op-Ed "page 7", a position she held till her death.

Robinson died suddenly on December 17, 1961, of a heart attack. She was buried at Mount Pleasant Cemetery following a private funeral at her Toronto home.

== Judith Robinson's books ==
Robinson's book Tom Cullen of Baltimore, a biography of the Canadian doctor who had made his name as a surgeon and gynecologist at Johns Hopkins Hospital was published in 1949. Cullen was a Baltimore MD Gynecologist and Brighton Ontario native who had operated on Ms. Robinson. Robinson travelled back and forth between Toronto and Baltimore over the course of three years to research and write the book.

Following her trip to Europe (1950) to observe the aftermath of the War, a selection of her columns, first published in the Fort Erie Times-Review, were collected and published as a book – As We Came By: (Toronto- J.M. Dent & Sons (Canada) Limited, 1951 . Print) In 1957, This is on the House, (Toronto – McClelland & Stewart Limited) was published containing a selection of her columns first printed in The Telegram and accompanied by cartoons by Grassick.

In 1957 she edited Freedom Wears a Crown by John Farthing. Farthing, a friend and former economics lecturer at McGill, had died in 1954 leaving his manuscript complete but unrevised.

After her death, George Grant dedicated his celebrated book Lament for a Nation (Toronto: McClelland and Stewart, 1965) – "To Derek Bedson and Judith Robinson – Two Lovers of Their Country – One Living and One Dead".

In November 2020, her personal archives, including manuscripts and correspondence with political and intellectual figures, was donated to McMaster University Library's William Ready Division of Archives and Research Collections.

== Awards ==
After the war, Judith was given two awards for services to Free France, as someone who "gave every possible assistance to the cause of Free France and General de Gaulle during the years in which the Vichy government was recognized by Canada." 1) "The Free French Commemorative Medal bears "France Libre" on one side and "1939–1945" on the reverse.) Also a citation which entitles her to wear the medal and expresses the thanks of the Free French Association. Signed by General de Larminat, President of Free French Association in Paris. 2. Diploma of thanks and appreciation from General de Gaulle, then provisional president

In 1954 she received the "Canadian Press Award for Spot Reporting" on breaking the story of the kiting of cheques which brought down a Liberal cabinet minister.

In 1976 Robinson was named posthumously named to the Canadian News Hall of Fame by the Toronto Press Club.

== Bibliography ==
=== Published works ===
- Tom Cullen of Baltimore. Toronto: Oxford University Press, 1949.
- As We Came By. Toronto: J.M. Dent & Sons (Canada Limited, 1951.
- Ensign on a Hill, The Story of the Church Home and Hospital and its School of Nursing 1854–1954. Baltimore: Church Home and Hospital, 1954.
- This is on the House. Toronto: McClelland & Stewart Limited, 1957.

=== Edited by Judith Robinson ===
- Farthing, John. Freedom Wears a Crown. Toronto: Kingswood House, 1957
