= Walter Stewart (journalist) =

Canadian journalist (1931–2004)

Walter Douglas Stewart (April 19, 1931 – September 15, 2004) was an outspoken Canadian writer, editor and journalism educator, a veteran of newspapers and magazines and author of more than twenty books, several of them bestsellers. The Globe and Mail reported news of his death with the headline: "He was Canada's conscience."

== Early life and career ==
Born in Toronto, the son of Miller Stewart and Margaret (Peg) Stewart, both atheists, Co-operative Commonwealth Federation activists and writers and CBC Radio broadcasters on nature, he was a class of 1949 graduate of London South Collegiate Institute in London, Ontario. In grade 11, he and a classmate became unpaid high school reporters for the London Echo community newspaper, where they co-wrote "The Lads Who Know," a muckraking column that criticized teaching methods. After the Echo folded, they shifted their attentions to the high school newspaper, alternating as editor-in-chief.

Stewart became an honours student in history at the University of Toronto, but dropped out in 1953 after three years. He took a taxi to the Toronto Telegram, where an editor offered him twenty-nine minutes until deadline to write up a piece on why he'd dropped out. The Telegram took him on as a reporter. He covered police and courts and wrote financial features. His time at the Telegram left him cynical about the news trade: "What I learned about journalism there was that it was a suspect craft, dominated by hypocrisy, exaggeration, and fakery. At the Tely, we toadied to advertisers, eschewed investigative reporting, slanted our stories gleefully to fit the party line (Conservative) and to appeal to the one man who counted – the publisher, [sic] John W. H. Bassett."

== Feature writer, editor and educator ==
He moved on from the Telegram to become picture editor and Ottawa correspondent for Star Weekly, a magazine then published by the Toronto Star. From 1968 to 1977, save a one-year interlude at the Star, he worked at Maclean's magazine, posted to Ottawa and Washington and eventually managing editor of the title. His later time at Maclean's was marked by conflict with editor Peter C. Newman.

From ca. 1988 until 1992, he edited Policy Options, the respected magazine of the nonpartisan Institute for Research on Public Policy.

Stewart headed the journalism program at University of King's College in Halifax, Nova Scotia, and later took the Max Bell chair in journalism at the University of Regina in Regina, Saskatchewan. In the 1990s, Stewart wrote a left-wing column for the Toronto Sun until it was retired in a newspaper budget cut, and was a regular guest host on CBC Radio's As It Happens.

== Books ==
Stewart was a prolific author of books, all but two of them non-fiction.

=== 1970s ===
Stewart's first book, Shrug: Trudeau in Power (New Press, 1971 and paperback, 1972; released in the U.S. as Trudeau in Power, Outerbridge & Dienstfrey, 1971), a sharp critique of both prime minister Pierre Trudeau and the Canadian political and media scenes around him, remained on Canadian bestseller lists for more than a year. He continued writing exposés on issues of public interest with Divide and Con: Canadian Politics at Work (New Press, 1973) and Hard to Swallow: Why Food Prices Keep Rising and What Can Be Done About It (Macmillan of Canada, 1974).

But Not in Canada! Smug Canadian Myths Shattered by Harsh Reality (Macmillan of Canada, 1976, revised paperback 1983) was a forceful exposition and attack on racism, anti-immigrant feeling and the far right in Canada which, his Globe obituary recalled nearly three decades later, "angered many."

As They See Us (McClelland and Stewart, 1977), on American perceptions of Canada, foresaw Talking to Americans, and Strike! (McClelland and Stewart, 1977) took an independent-minded look at strikes and labor-management relations. Paper Juggernaut: Big Government Gone Mad (McClelland and Stewart, 1979) slammed public management of the Pickering airport and Montréal-Mirabel airport projects.

=== 1980s ===
Towers of Gold, Feet of Clay: The Canadian Banks (Collins, 1982; Totem, 1983) was a massive success, staying on Canadian bestseller lists for more than a year. More than seventy thousand copies of his lengthy critique of the Canadian banking system were sold. The title references the Royal Bank tower in Toronto, whose windows are covered with a gold film. The book was translated into French as Les géants de la finance: un dossier-choc sur l'entreprise bancaire canadienne (tr. by Jacques de Roussan; Inédi, 1982).

He next released True Blue: The Loyalist Legend (Collins, 1985), on the United Empire Loyalists, and Uneasy Lies the Head: The Truth About Canada's Crown Corporations (Collins, 1987). With outspoken Quebec politician Eric Kierans, Stewart co-authored The Wrong End of the Rainbow: The Collapse of Free Enterprise in Canada (Collins, 1988; Harper & Collins, 1989).

Stewart edited Canadian Newspapers: The Inside Story (Hurtig Publishers, 1980) and The Environment (IRPP, 1988).

=== 1990s ===
In the 1990s, Stewart's critical attention turned again to financial exposé. He released The Golden Fleece: Why the Stock Market Costs You Money (McClelland and Stewart, 1992), Belly Up: The Spoils of Bankruptcy (McClelland and Stewart, 1995) and Bank Heist: How our Financial Giants are Costing You Money (HarperCollins, 1997). Too Big to Fail: Olympia & York: The Story Behind the Headlines (McClelland and Stewart, 1993), an ultimately sympathetic treatment of the Reichmann family and the rise and fall of their high-profile international property developer Olympia and York, was probably Stewart's most widely read title outside Canada.

A 1996 book on charity was Stewart's most controversial. Under threat of a libel suit, Douglas & McIntyre, the Vancouver-based publishers of The Charity Game: Greed, Waste and Fraud in Canada's $86-Billion-a-Year Compassion Industry, withdrew their copies from sale and asked their distributors to return all unsold copies within a few months after release. Nonetheless, the book helped spur considerable discussion on the role and governance of charities.

Dismantling the State: Downsizing to Disaster (Stoddart, 1998) critiqued neoconservatism and neoliberalism in Canada, and the haste in many quarters to cut back and privatize public services.

Stewart also wrote two lighthearted murder mysteries, starring small-town reporter Carlton Withers and set in the Kawartha Lakes region where Stewart's family had cottaged since his youth and the author lived out his own later years: Right Church, Wrong Pew (Macmillan of Canada, 1990; McClelland and Stewart, 1991) and Hole in One (McClelland and Stewart, 1992).

His love for the Kawartha Lakes was also regularly featured in his columns for the Toronto Sun, in which he often mentioned the fictional town of Bosky Dell, described as "a sylvan paradise in the heart of the Kawarthas".

=== 2000s ===
In his last several years, Stewart's books have moved to a more positive pitch. M.J.: The Life and Times of M.J. Coldwell (Stoddart, 2000), commissioned by the Douglas-Coldwell Foundation, was welcomed as a long-overdue biography of the democratic socialist parliamentarian. My Cross-Country Checkup: Across Canada by Minivan, Through Space and Time (Stoddart, 2000) presented a portrait of Stewart and his wife Joan retracing a trip they had taken in 1964 for a Star Weekly series, Joan driving, as Walter had never learned to do so, at the dawn of a new century.

Stewart worked again with Kierans, a longtime friend, on the politician's memoirs, Remembering (Stoddart, 2001). His final book, The Life and Politics of Tommy Douglas (McArthur, 2003), recounted the life of the first leader of the New Democratic Party; a 2004 paperback reissue, as The Life and Political Times of Tommy Douglas, marked Douglas' win in the national popularity contest to name The Greatest Canadian.

Stewart died at his home in Sturgeon Point, Kawartha Lakes, Ontario, of cancer.

== Sources ==
- Csillag, Ron (2004-09-16). "He was Canada's conscience." The Globe and Mail, p. R7
