= John Downing =

John Henry Downing
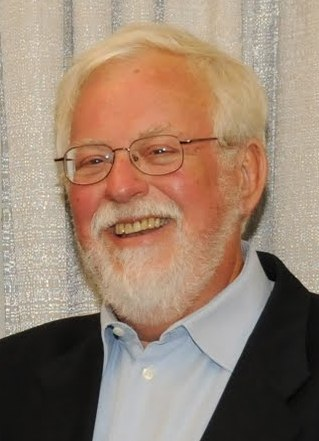

President, Canadian National Exhibition
- In office October, 1999 – October 2001
- Preceded by: Robert Bowman
- Succeeded by: Debra Woodman

Personal details
- Born: June 10, 1936 (age 90) Toronto, Ontario, Canada
- Spouse: Mary Horvat (1962-present)
- Children: 3; John Henry III, Brett D., Mark
- Education: Ryerson Polytechnical Institute (Bachelor of Applied Arts 1972)
- Website: http://blog.johndowning.ca/

John Downing (born 1936) is an author, reporter, editor and columnist, most notably writing for the Toronto Telegram and later the Toronto Sun.

== Journalism ==
He was editor of the Whitehorse Star in 1957, and reporter and editor on the Toronto Telegram from 1958 to 1971. He was a "Day Oner" of the Toronto Sun first as city hall columnist and then as the Editor from 1985 to 1997.

== Professional associations ==
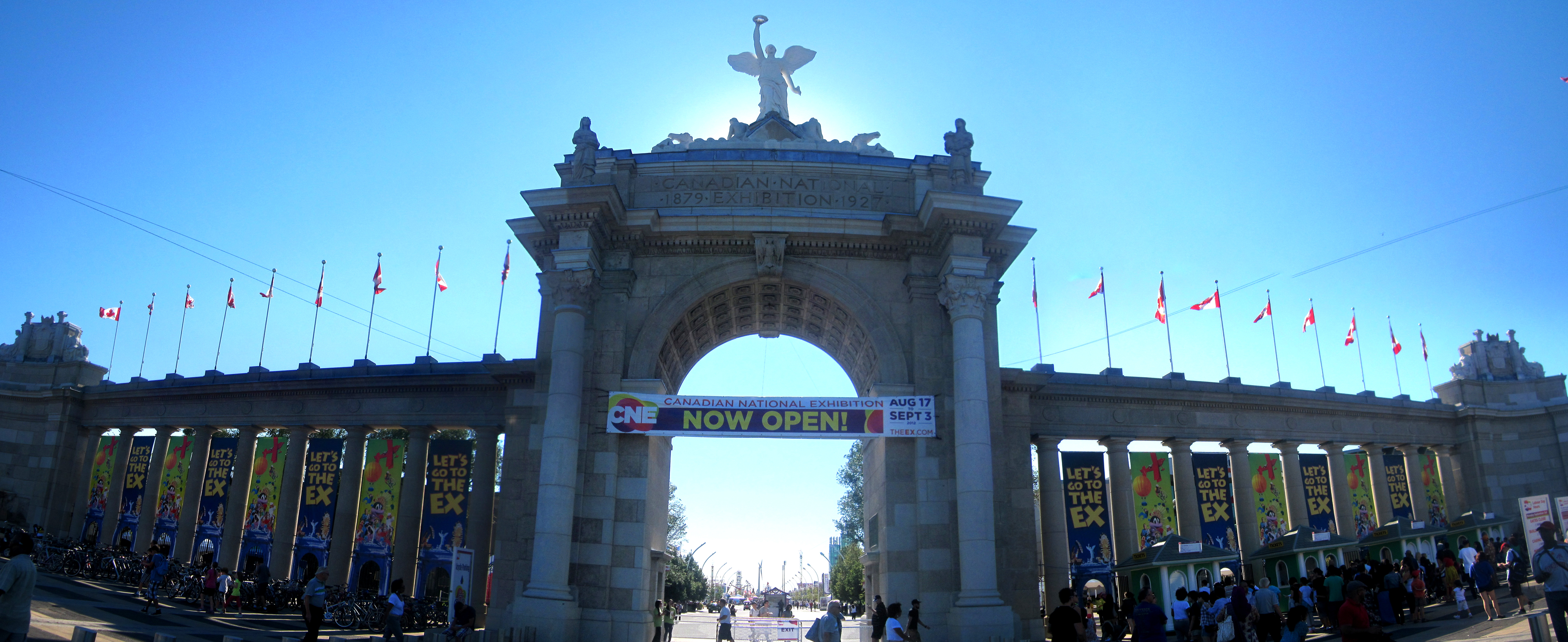

John Downing has been president of the Canadian National Exhibition, Toronto Press Club and Press Clubs of Canada, and director and governor of the Toronto Outdoor Art Show, Runnymede Health Care Centre, Exhibition Place, Toronto and Region Conservation Authority, Ontario Safety League, Royal Agricultural Winter Fair, and Canada's Sports Hall of Fame.

== Safety ==
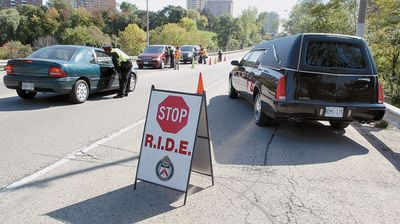
He has written chapters for books on the CNE and Toronto politics, two political biographies, and articles for Time, Macleans and other publications. He appeared on the CBC, CityTV, the Global Television Network, CFTR and CFRB.

Downing has been credited with popularizing the term "Red Rocket" for the Toronto Transit Corporation's (TTC) streetcars.

== Images ==
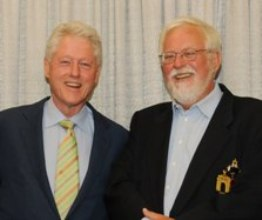
Clinton and Downing

== Chronology ==
- 1957 - Downing joins Whitehorse Star as Editor
- 1958 - Downing joins the Toronto Telegram first as Reporter then City Editor and Managing Editor
- 1971 - Downing joins the Toronto Sun as a columnist
- 1985 - Downing becomes Toronto Sun Editor
- 1999 - Downing becomes President of Canadian National Exhibition Association

== Publications ==
- Phillips, Nathan and Downing, John. Mayor of All the People, McClelland & Stewart Canada, 1967.
- Downing, John. "Ryerson University - A Unicorn Among Horses" John Downing (April 17 2017), Canada, 2017.
