= Adrienne Batra =

Canadian journalist and publicist

Adrienne Batra (born November 9, 1973) is a Canadian journalist and publicist. She has been editor-in-chief of the Toronto Sun since May 2015.

== Biography ==
Batra was born in Saskatchewan, the youngest daughter of Harbir and Deepi Batra. Her parents were teachers who had immigrated to Canada from India in 1967, by way of Ethiopia. After graduating from high school in 1991, Batra joined the Primary Reserves of the Canadian Armed Forces where she obtained the officer rank of Lieutenant. After obtaining university degrees in political science and public administration she joined the Regina office of the Canadian Taxpayers Federation as a researcher, eventually becoming its Manitoba director.

She and her husband moved to Toronto in 2008 and, during the 2010 mayoral election Batra worked as communications director on Rob Ford's successful campaign for mayor. She subsequently joined the mayor's office, serving as Ford's press secretary for a year until she resigned in December 2011 to become the Toronto Sun's Comment Editor. She also became CFRB Newstalk 1010's municipal affairs correspondent and wrote a column in the Sun on municipal affairs.

In November 2013, she joined the Sun News Network as host of Straight Talk, an afternoon news and comment program, and took a leave of absence from her position as a Sun comment editor, though continuing as a columnist, in order to work for the network full-time until the channel went off the air in February 2015. She was the fill-in host on CFRB radio as its weekday afternoon "Live Drive" host.

Batra rejoined the Toronto Sun staff in May 2015 to become the paper's editor-in-chief.

In her role as editor-in-chief of the Toronto Sun, Adrienne Batra faced controversy in December 2023 when the newspaper published a cartoon depicting Ukrainian President Volodymyr Zelenskyy picking the pocket of U.S. President Joe Biden. The cartoon was criticized for being antisemitic and Ukrainophobic, leading to denunciations from Canadian Prime Minister Justin Trudeau, the Ukrainian Canadian Congress, and the Centre for Israel and Jewish Affairs. In response, the Toronto Sun issued an apology on behalf of Adrienne Batra, acknowledging that the cartoon did not meet their editorial standards.

Batra describes herself as a libertarian and is a fan of Ayn Rand and Margaret Thatcher.
