= Toronto Telegram =

Canadian daily newspaper

- Type: Daily newspaper
- Format: Broadsheet
- Founder: John Ross Robertson
- Founded: April 18, 1876
- Ceased publication: October 30, 1971
- Political alignment: Conservative
- Language: English
- Headquarters: Toronto, Ontario, Canada

The Toronto Telegram was a Canadian daily newspaper published in Toronto, Ontario, from 1876 to 1971. Founded by John Ross Robertson as the Evening Telegram, it was an afternoon broadsheet popularly known as the Tely. For much of its history, the newspaper had a conservative editorial outlook and supported Canada's ties with Britain and the British Empire.

The Telegram developed a large working-class readership and became Toronto's highest-circulation daily before being overtaken by the rival Toronto Daily Star in 1932. John W. H. Bassett acquired the newspaper in 1952 and remained its publisher until its closure. Faced with declining circulation, advertising difficulties and mounting financial losses, Bassett ceased publication on October 30, 1971. Several former Telegram journalists subsequently helped establish the Toronto Sun, which published its first issue two days later.

== History ==
=== Robertson era 1876–1918 ===
The Evening Telegram was founded by John Ross Robertson, a Toronto journalist and publisher who had previously established the short-lived Toronto Daily Telegraph. Robertson borrowed CA$10,000 to acquire the assets of the defunct newspaper The Liberal and published the first issue of the Telegram on April 18, 1876. The inaugural edition had a circulation of about 3,800 copies.

Alexander Fraser Pirie, previously a journalist with his father's Guelph Herald, served as the newspaper's first editor from 1876 until 1888. He was succeeded by John R. "Black Jack" Robinson, who remained editor-in-chief until his death in 1928.

Robertson positioned the Telegram as an inexpensive, strongly local newspaper aimed particularly at Toronto's working-class readers. It became closely associated with the city's conservative Protestant and Orange community and strongly supported Canada's ties with Britain and the British Empire. Its emphasis on local news helped the Telegram build one of the largest newspaper circulations in the city.

As the newspaper expanded, it moved several times in downtown Toronto. By 1899, the Telegram occupied a purpose-built headquarters at the southeast corner of Bay and Melinda streets. The building, which became closely identified with the newspaper, remained its home for more than six decades.

Robertson continued to control the Telegram until his death on May 31, 1918. Under arrangements he had made, ownership of the newspaper then passed to a trust, which continued to operate it for the next three decades.

=== Robertson trust and McCullagh, 1918–1952 ===
Following Robertson's death in 1918, the Telegram continued under a trust he had established. The newspaper remained a major competitor of the Toronto Daily Star, with the two afternoon papers engaged in a prolonged circulation battle involving promotional contests, competing scoops and efforts to secure exclusive stories.

The Telegram, which had become Toronto's largest-circulation daily, was overtaken by the Star in 1932 and never regained the lead. During this period, the paper developed features intended to attract a broad family readership, including a Saturday colour comics section and a weekly radio guide.

Following the death of Robertson's widow in 1947, the newspaper was sold in 1948 for CA$3.6 million to George McCullagh, publisher of The Globe and Mail. McCullagh brought John W. H. Bassett to the Telegram as publisher. The word "Evening" was dropped from the newspaper's name in 1949.

=== Bassett era, 1952–1971 ===
Following McCullagh's death in 1952, John W. H. Bassett acquired the newspaper, using financing from the Eaton family. Bassett attempted to revive the newspaper's competition with the Toronto Daily Star by introducing new features and modernizing its production. Among the changes was the introduction of colour photography, which brought an end to the distinctive pink newsprint on which the Telegram had previously been printed.

The circulation rivalry with the Star remained intense. The two newspapers competed for scoops and exclusive interviews and used promotional contests to attract readers. The competition sometimes extended to concealing newsmakers from the rival paper; after Marilyn Bell became the first person to swim across Lake Ontario in 1954, the Telegram kept her away from competing reporters while preparing its coverage.

The Telegram also expanded its entertainment and broadcasting coverage. Its weekly radio listings were extended to include television following the growth of the new medium in the 1950s, while its colour comics became a substantial part of the weekend paper.

In March 1957, the Telegram introduced a Sunday edition, becoming the first Toronto daily to publish on Sunday. The move prompted the Attorney-General of Ontario to threaten prosecution under the Lord's Day Act. The Sunday edition failed to attract sufficient readership and was discontinued after four months.

In December 1959, Bassett purchased a 3.6-acre (15,000 m^{2}) property on Front Street West, formerly occupied by Regis College and Loretto Abbey. In 1963, the Telegram moved from its longtime Bay and Melinda streets headquarters to a new building on the site, part of Bassett's modernization of the newspaper. During this period, the Telegram Corporation became a principal owner of Toronto television station CFTO-TV. When CFTO's licence was awarded in 1960, the Telegram Corporation and the Eaton family formed the Baton group, which held 40 per cent of the licensee; additional voting shares held by the Telegram gave it 51 per cent of the company's voting stock.

On July 9, 1964, a labour dispute between Toronto printers and the publishers of the Telegram, Toronto Daily Star and The Globe and Mail resulted in a strike and lockout involving employees at all three newspapers. The dispute centred in part on the introduction of computers and changes to working practices. The newspapers continued publishing during the dispute.

=== Closure ===
By the late 1960s, the Telegram was experiencing substantial financial losses. It lost CA$635,000 in 1969 and $921,000 in 1970, and was projected to lose a further $900,000 in 1971. Another labour dispute was also approaching; in September 1971, union negotiators received authorization to call a strike.

Bassett announced in September that the newspaper would cease publication, and the final issue of the Telegram appeared on October 30, 1971, ending 95 years of publication.

A group of former Telegram employees, including Doug Creighton, Peter Worthington and Andy Donato, established the Toronto Sun. The new tabloid recruited numerous former Telegram staff and published its first issue on November 1, 1971, two days after the Telegram closed.

Toronto Sun Publishing acquired some assets of the former Telegram, including its syndication operations and newspaper vending boxes. The Telegram subscriber list was sold separately to the Toronto Star for CA$10 million, The Telegram's former headquarters at 444 Front Street West later became the headquarters of The Globe and Mail, which moved into the building in 1974.

== Legacy ==
The closure of the Telegram contributed directly to the creation of the Toronto Sun, which employed a number of former Telegram journalists, editors and production staff.

Former Telegram writer Jock Carroll published The Death of the Toronto Telegram & Other Newspaper Stories in 1971. The book combined an account of the newspaper's final years with stories from Carroll's career in Canadian journalism.

The York University Clara Thomas Archives and Special Collections holds the Toronto Telegram fonds, documenting the newspaper and its predecessor, the Evening Telegram, from 1876 to 1971. The collection includes approximately 1.3 million photographs, 350 scrapbooks and 16 metres of textual records.

== Notable staff ==
Notable journalists, editors, columnists and cartoonists who worked for the Telegram included:

- George Bain – reporter and City Hall reporter who later became a national affairs columnist.
- Isabel Bassett – reporter, later a broadcaster and Ontario cabinet minister.
- Al Beaton – editorial cartoonist
- Jock Carroll – reporter and columnist who later wrote The Death of the Toronto Telegram.
- Greg Clark – humour columnist and former war correspondent.
- Gordon Donaldson – reporter who later worked in television journalism and production.
- Andy Donato – art director and cartoonist who later helped establish the Toronto Sun.
- John Downing – reporter and editor who later became editor-in-chief of the Toronto Sun.
- Frank Drea – labour reporter who later became an Ontario cabinet minister.
- Doug Fisher – political columnist who later wrote for the Toronto Sun.
- John Fraser – reporter and columnist who later edited Saturday Night.
- Trent Frayne – sportswriter and columnist.
- Clyde Gilmour – journalist who later became a CBC Radio broadcaster (Gilmour's Albums) and film critic for the Toronto Star
- Dale Goldhawk – reporter who later worked in radio and television.
- George Gross – sportswriter who later became sports editor of the Toronto Sun.
- Ron Haggart – reporter and crime correspondent. Moved to the Globe and Mail in 1971 before joining CITY-TV and then the CBC
- Fraser Kelly – political editor who later became a television news anchor.
- Robert Kirkland Kernighan – columnist and poet.
- Bob MacDonald – columnist who later joined the Toronto Sun.
- J. Douglas MacFarlane – city editor and later editor-in-chief.
- McKenzie Porter – columnist and arts critic who later joined the Toronto Sun.
- Ted Reeve – sportswriter and columnist.
- Paul Rimstead – reporter and columnist who later joined the Toronto Sun.
- Judith Robinson – columnist from 1953 to 1961.
- Margaret Scrivener – reporter who later became an Ontario cabinet minister.
- Merle Shain – feature writer who later became an associate editor of Chatelaine.
- C. H. J. Snider – reporter and editor best known for his "Schooner Days" column.
- Walter Stewart – reporter and editor who later became an author and columnist.
- Bert Wemp – reporter and editor who served as Mayor of Toronto in 1930.
- Ben Wicks – cartoonist, later moved to the Toronto Star
- Peter Worthington – foreign correspondent and later founding editor of the Toronto Sun.
- Ritchie Yorke – music journalist who later wrote for Billboard and Rolling Stone.
- Scott Young – sports editor and columnist who later returned to The Globe and Mail.
- Lubor J. Zink – Ottawa-based political columnist who later joined the Toronto Sun.

== See also ==
- Toronto Standard 1848-49
- Toronto Star 1892 to present
- Toronto Sun 1971 to present
- The Globe and Mail 1936 to present
  - The Globe 1844-1936
  - The Mail and Empire 1895-1936
    - The Toronto Mail 1872-1895
    - Toronto Empire 1872-1895
