= Peter Worthington =

Canadian journalist

- Born: Peter John Vickers Worthington; 16 February 1927; Winnipeg, Manitoba Canada
- Died: 12 May 2013 (aged 86); Toronto, Ontario, Canada
- Occupation: Writer
- Spouses: Helen Parmelee (m. 1957; div. 1967); Yvonne Crittenden (m. 1970)
- Children: 3

Peter John Vickers Worthington (February 16, 1927 – May 12, 2013) was a Canadian journalist. A foreign correspondent with the Toronto Telegram newspaper from 1956, Worthington was an eyewitness to the murder of Lee Harvey Oswald in 1963, and can be seen in photographs of the event. He remained with the Telegram until it folded in 1971. Worthington was the founding editor of the Toronto Sun newspaper, which was created by former Telegram employees upon that newspaper's demise.

In 1996 Worthington was inducted into the Canadian News Hall of Fame.

== Early life ==
Born in Winnipeg, Worthington was son of Major General F. F. Worthington, Peter Worthington was a veteran of both the Second World War and the Korean War. He joined the Royal Canadian Navy Volunteer Reserve (RCNVR) in 1944, at the age of 17, and served as an air gunner in the Fleet Air Arm, and briefly in the United Kingdom, until his discharge in 1946 with the rank of Sub-Lieutenant.

From there he went to the University of British Columbia. Worthington left the university before completing his degree and joined Princess Patricia's Canadian Light Infantry as a Lieutenant in 1950.

In the Korean War he was a platoon commander, then battalion intelligence officer in the Princess Patricia's Canadian Light Infantry (PPCLI) in Korea, and ended the war with the U.S. Air Force, 6147 Mosquito Squadron, directing air strikes at enemy targets.

After his discharge, he returned to the University of British Columbia, completing his B.A., and proceeded to earn a Bachelor's in journalism from what is now Carleton University in Ottawa.

== Toronto Telegram ==
In 1956, he joined the staff at the Toronto Telegram newspaper. One of early assignments was to cover the Canadian troops stationed in the Gaza Strip. Canadian forces were sent under the directions of the United Nations. From that beginning, he would go on to interview King Hussein of Jordan in 1958, Thomas Anthony Dooley III in 1959, and Albert Schweitzer in 1960.

In April 1961, Worthington was in Algiers covering the Algerian War, and on May 15, 1961, Worthington was in Luanda, Angola, covering the Portuguese Colonial War. In 1962 he was in Netherlands New Guinea, covering the invasion of the country by Indonesia. He was also in the North East frontier of India and China when Chinese forces invaded in that same year.

On assignment for the Telegram, Worthington was in Dallas on November 25, 1963, where he was an eyewitness to the killing of Lee Harvey Oswald. He covered the trial of Jack Ruby in February 1964.

Starting in January 1965, Worthington was posted in Moscow. In 1967 he was assigned to Cairo, where he covered the Six-Day War. On August 21, 1968, he was in Prague, Czechoslovakia covering the Warsaw Pact invasion of Czechoslovakia.

Worthington covered the Nigerian Civil War of 1967 to 1970 in a series of reports that resulted in his second of four National Newspaper Awards and a National Newspaper Citation.

== Editor of the Toronto Sun ==
On Saturday September 18, 1971 the Telegram announced it was closing. Joining former employees of the Telegram, a new tabloid was started (the Toronto Sun newspaper), the first edition appearing Monday, November 1, 1971, a day after the last edition of the Telegram. Worthington was the new paper's founding editor. He assumed the title editor-in-chief in 1976 when former Toronto Telegram editor-in-chief J.D. MacFarlane was hired in order to make clear that he didn't answer to MacFarlane, who was forced to take the title "editorial director" instead.

A conservative, Worthington led the brash new tabloid throughout the 1970s as it campaigned against the government of Pierre Trudeau. In 1978 he became the first Canadian journalist to be charged under the Official Secrets Act for a column in the Sun identifying 16 Canadians who had been recruited by the KGB into treasonous acts on behalf of the Soviet Union. After a year of preliminary hearings, the case was thrown out of court.

Worthington resigned from the Sun's board of directors and as editor in 1982 after the board voted to accept an offer by Maclean-Hunter to purchase the Sun chain; fearing that the newspaper would lose its independence, he cast the sole dissenting vote against the sale.

== Political career ==
Following the newspaper's sale, Worthington took a leave of absence from the Sun in 1982 in order to seek the nomination of the Progressive Conservative Party for a by-election in Toronto's Broadview—Greenwood riding; Worthington's nomination was opposed by the party leadership and he was defeated by Bill Fastis, who was supported by the riding's Greek-Canadian community, in a hotly contested campaign in which the six candidates for the Tory nomination sold thousands of party memberships. Worthington then ran in the by-election as an independent candidate, and placed a strong second to the winner, New Democrat Lynn McDonald, and ahead of the official Tory candidate. He succeeded in becoming the official Progressive Conservative nominee for the riding in the 1984 general election, but was again defeated by McDonald.

Son-in-law and political analyst David Frum credits Worthington's 1982 nomination battle and his subsequent battle with the Tory leadership as "set[ting] in motion the train of events that brought down Conservative Party leader Joe Clark and opened the way for Brian Mulroney to win the landslide Conservative victory of 1984."

Worthington was a committed conservative and anti-Communist. In the mid-1980s, he collaborated with Craig Williamson, a former South African Police officer responsible for bombing anti-apartheid activists, to produce a propaganda film The ANC method - violence which was distributed by the far-right group Citizens for Foreign Aid Reform throughout Canada in 1988. Less well known is his support for animal welfare and animal rights and long-time involvement with the Toronto Humane Society.

=== FBI informant allegations ===
Worthington was accused by the Ottawa Citizen of being an informant for the American Federal Bureau of Investigation about the suspected political sympathies of a number of his friends, including June Callwood. Worthington filed a complaint against the Ottawa Citizen with the Ontario Press Council. The OPC rebuked the Citizen for not providing Worthington ample opportunity to respond before publication. The Ottawa Citizen issued an apology under protest, but the allegations against Worthington were never disproven.

== Return to the Sun ==
After his political defeats, Worthington returned as a columnist for the Toronto Sun and its sister newspapers. In 1989, he was fired by publisher Doug Creighton after being quoted in a rival newspaper saying that the Sun was not a serious newspaper. He was re-hired soon after to be founding editor of the Ottawa Sun for a year, when that paper was relaunched as a daily, and returned to the Toronto Sun and the Sun chain as a columnist. He continued up until his death as a columnist for Sun Media's parent, QMI.

== Personal life ==
Worthington was married to Yvonne Crittenden and is stepfather of conservative writer Danielle Crittenden, wife of writer and political advisor David Frum.

== Death ==
Worthington died in Toronto on May 12, 2013, after spending four days in Toronto General Hospital with a serious staph infection that compromised his heart, kidneys and other organs. His last published article was his own obituary which began with the line: "If you are reading this, I am dead. How's that for a lead?"

== Bibliography ==
- Worthington, Peter (1984). Looking for Trouble: a journalist's life, and then some. Toronto: Key Porter Books. ISBN 0-91949336-X.
