= Toronto Sun =

Canadian tabloid newspaper published in Toronto

- Cover from June 27, 2010
- Type: Daily newspaper
- Owner: Postmedia
- Editor-in-chief: Adrienne Batra
- Founded: 1971
- Headquarters: 365 Bloor Street East; Toronto, Ontario; M4W 3L4
- Circulation: 119,048 weekdays 111,515 Saturdays; 142,376 Sundays (as of 2015)
- ISSN: 0837-3175
- OCLC number: 66653673
- Website: torontosun.com

The Toronto Sun is an English-language tabloid newspaper published daily in Toronto, Ontario, Canada. The newspaper is one of several Sun tabloids published by Postmedia Network. The newspaper's offices are located at Postmedia Place in downtown Toronto.

The newspaper published its first edition in November 1971, after it had acquired the assets of the defunct Toronto Telegram, and hired portions of its staff. In 1978, Toronto Sun Holdings and Toronto Sun Publishing were consolidated to form Sun Publishing (later renamed Sun Media Corporation). Sun Publishing went on to form similar tabloids to the Toronto Sun in other Canadian cities during the late 1970s and 1980s. The Sun was acquired by Postmedia Network in 2015, as a part of the sale of the Sun's parent company, Sun Media.

== History ==
=== 20th century ===
In 1971, the Toronto Sun Publishing was created and purchased the syndication operations and newspaper vending boxes from the Toronto Telegram, which ceased operations in the same year. The Toronto Sun also recruited staff from the former Telegram conservative broadsheet newspaper, and published its first edition on 1 November 1971.

Publisher Doug Creighton was originally going to name the new newspaper the Toronto News but Andy Donato, who was asked to design the paper's first front page and decided to call the paper the Toronto Sun instead. Creighton decided it was too late to change it and renamed the paper.

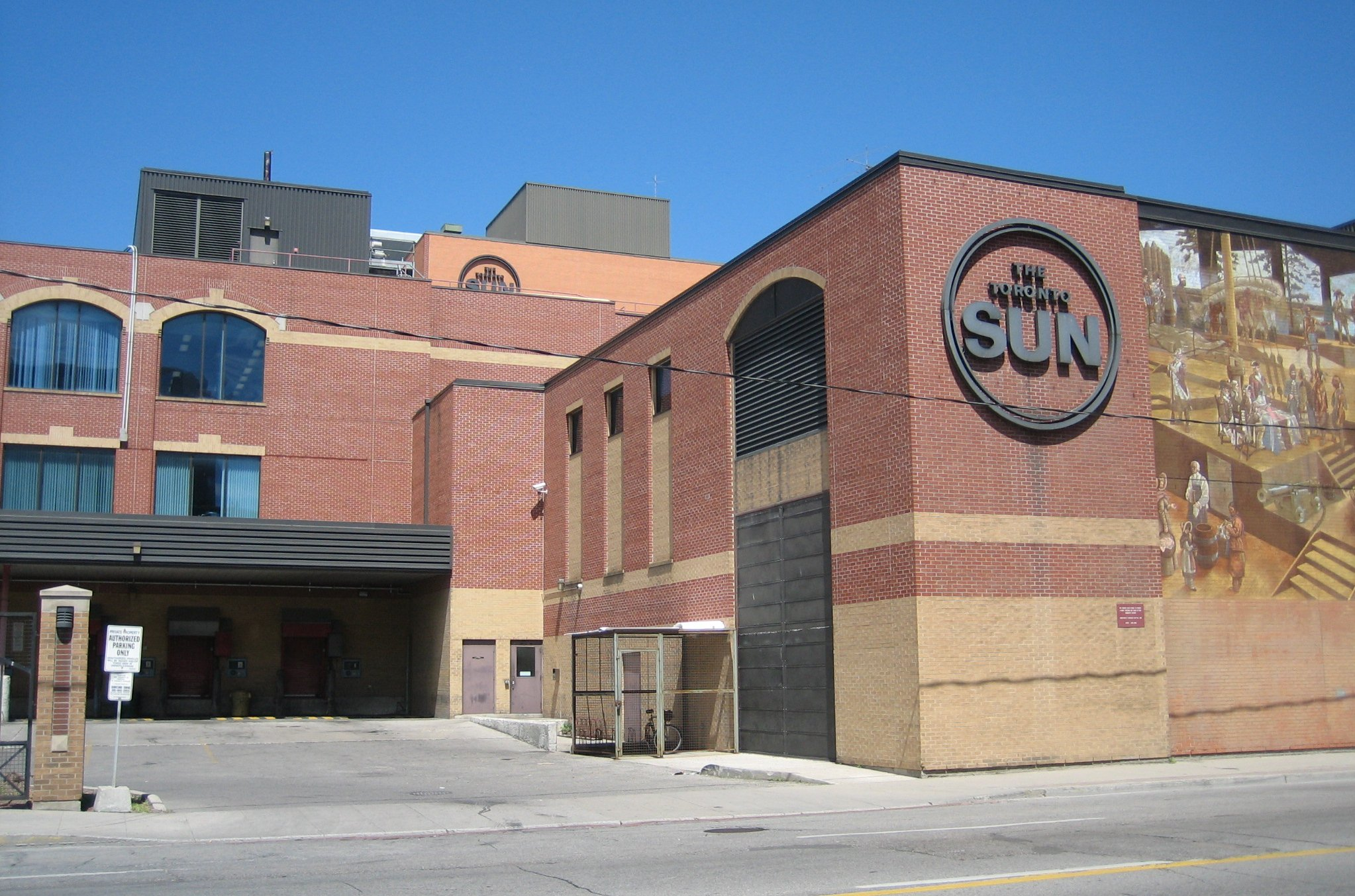
The former Toronto Sun building at 333 King Street East in 2007, as seen looking north from Front Street East

The Toronto Sun was originally published out of leased space at the Eclipse White Wear Company Building at 322 King Street West. In 1975, the newspaper moved into the Toronto Sun Building at 333 King Street East which was eventually expanded to six storeys to house all of the newspaper's operations. In 2010, the building was sold to property development company First Gulf, and the Sun consolidated its operations onto the second floor. It remained in the building until it relocated offices in 2016.

In 1978, Toronto Sun Holdings and Toronto Sun Publishing were consolidated to form Sun Publishing. The corporation expanded its tabloid footprint, having established its second tabloid, the Edmonton Sun through a partnership agreement with Edmonton Sun Publishing in 1978. The Albertan was acquired in 1980 and made into the company's third tabloid, the Calgary Sun in 1980.

In 1988, The Washington Post described the Sun as an example of tabloid journalism.

The Toronto Sun has been criticized for some of the views published in its editorials and opinion columns in its first two decades. Historian Jamie Bradburn has cited the newspaper's historical treatment of apartheid-era South Africa, homosexuality, immigration, eugenics and the dictatorship of Augusto Pinochet, arguing that provocative conservative commentary had been a defining feature of the paper since its founding. He also noted that objectionable historical opinions were not unique to the Sun. A 1985 content analysis by the Urban Alliance on Race Relations of 200 columns and editorials published between 1978 and 1985 identified denigrating stereotypes of several racial and ethnic communities.

The paper was also criticized for its treatment of LGBTQ rights and AIDS. Retrospective and scholarly accounts have cited its opposition to legal protections for gays and lesbians, its coverage of the 1981 Toronto bathhouse raids, and columns supporting the quarantine or isolation of people with AIDS. In 1985, a column by McKenzie Porter opposing Black majority rule in South Africa, together with a related editorial, prompted complaints from anti-apartheid and community organizations and proposals that the City of Toronto withdraw its advertising from the newspaper. Publisher Paul Godfrey said that the Sun opposed apartheid but defended Porter's right to express his views. The Ontario Press Council subsequently dismissed a complaint that the material promoted racism or wilfully spread hatred, upholding the newspaper's right to publish opinion while stating that publication did not necessarily indicate endorsement.

=== 21st century ===
In 2004, the Sun began its annual George Gross/Toronto Sun Sportsperson of the Year award. By the mid-2000s, the word "The" was dropped from the paper's name and the newspaper adopted its current logo.

The paper acquired a television station from Craig Media in 2005, which was renamed SUN TV. It was later transformed into the Sun News Network until its demise in 2015.

As of the end of 2007, the Sun had a Monday through Saturday circulation of approximately 180,000 papers and Sunday circulation of 310,000.

The Sun was acquired by Postmedia in 2015, with its purchase of Sun Media from Quebecor. Following the acquisition the Toronto Sun staff and operations moved to 365 Bloor Street East, the same building that houses the National Post, in March 2016. However, the two newspapers maintain separate newsrooms.

== Circulation ==
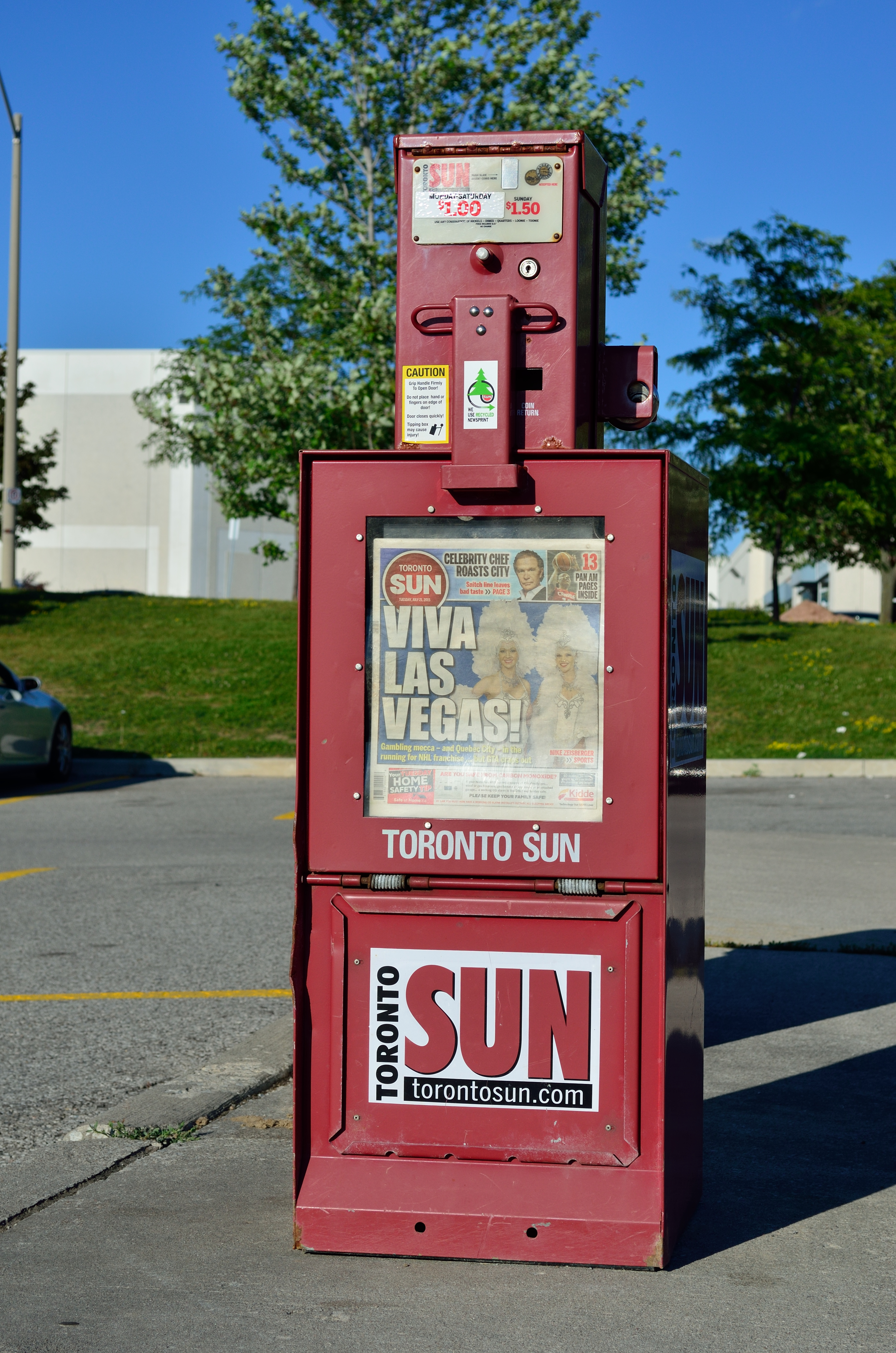
A Toronto Sun newspaper vending machine in 2015

The Toronto Sun has seen—like most Canadian daily newspapers—a decline in circulation. Its total circulation dropped by 36 percent to 121,304 copies daily from 2009 to 2015.

Daily average

== Notable staff ==
=== Editors-in-chief ===
The Toronto Sun originally had several editors with various responsibilities, none with the title "editor-in-chief"; however, from 1971 to 1976, Peter Worthington was listed on the newspaper's masthead immediately under the publisher, Doug Creighton.

- Peter Worthington (1976–1982)
- Barbara Amiel (1983–1985)
- John Downing editor (1985–1997), not editor-in-chief until 1995
- Peter O'Sullivan (1995–1999)
- Mike Strobel (1999–2001)
- Mike Therien (2001–2004)
- Jim Jennings (2004–2006)
- Glenn Garnett (2007)
- Lou Clancy (2007–2009)
- James Wallace (2009–2013)
- Wendy Metcalfe (2013–2015)
- Adrienne Batra (2015–present)

=== Current staff ===
- Adrienne Batra, editor-in-chief, former comment editor and municipal affairs columnist
- Warren Kinsella, political columnist
- Brian Lilley, provincial, national affairs columnist
- Steve Simmons, sports columnist

=== Former staff ===
- Charles Adler, QMI columnist
- David Akin, columnist
- Barbara Amiel, editor and columnist
- Joan Barfoot, reporter
- Stan Behal, photojournalist
- Christie Blatchford, columnist
- Mark Bonokoski, columnist, editorial writer
- Mark Bourrie, reporter
- Jim Brown, manager
- Scott Burnside, crime reporter
- Dalton Camp, columnist
- Gordon Chong, columnist
- Sheila Copps, columnist
- Michael Coren, QMI columnist
- Danielle Crittenden, reporter, columnist
- Andy Donato, editorial cartoonist
- John Downing, city hall columnist, editor-in-chief
- Tarek Fatah, columnist
- Mike Filey, Toronto history columnist
- Doug Fisher, Parliament Hill columnist
- Allan Fotheringham, national affairs columnist
- David Frum, columnist
- W. Gifford-Jones, M.D. (pseudonym for Ken Walker), medical columnist
- Edward Greenspan, lawyer, columnist
- George Gross, corporate sports editor, columnist
- Max Haines, "Crime Flashback" feature
- Paul Hellyer, columnist and founding investor
- Jim Hunt, sports writer
- Ajit Jain, columnist
- George Jonas, columnist
- Linda Leatherdale, business editor, columnist
- Ezra Levant, QMI columnist
- Sue-Ann Levy, political columnist, former municipal affairs columnist
- Bob MacDonald, columnist
- Heather Mallick, columnist
- Salim Mansur, columnist
- Eric Margolis, international affairs columnist, contributing editor
- Rachel Marsden, columnist
- Lois Maxwell (Moneypenney), columnist
- Judi McLeod, education reporter
- Ben Mulroney, columnist
- McKenzie Porter, columnist
- Ted Reeve, sports columnist
- Sid Ryan, columnist
- Paul Rimstead, columnist
- Laura Sabia, columnist
- Morton Shulman, columnist
- Joey Slinger, columnist
- Walter Stewart, columnist
- John Tory, mayor of Toronto, former Rogers executive
- Garth Turner, business editor
- Sherri Wood, columnist
- Peter Worthington, columnist, former editor
- Lubor J. Zink, columnist

== See also ==
- Media in Canada
- List of media outlets in Toronto
- List of newspapers in Canada
- List of the largest Canadian newspapers by circulation
