= Douglas Creighton =

Canadian journalist

- Born: November 27, 1928
- Died: January 6, 2004 (aged 75)
- Citizenship: Canadian
- Occupations: Journalist; publisher
- Known for: Founder and former publisher of the Toronto Sun

Douglas Creighton OC was a Canadian journalist who co-founded the Toronto Sun with Peter Worthington.

== Career ==
In 1948 Creighton joined the Toronto Telegram as a police reporter. He advanced to the position of city editor in 1967 and rose to the position of managing editor in 1969. John W. H. Bassett, the owner of the Telegram, shuttered the paper in 1971. Creighton founded the Toronto Sun with many of the Telegram's former employees and led the Sun to become a national chain of newspapers under the banner of Sun Media.

Creighton was appointed an Officer of the Order of Canada in 1991.

Creighton's career came to an end in 1992, when the board of directors of the Toronto Sun Publishing Corp unexpectedly removed him from his position as CEO.
