= Canadian University Press =

Newswire service

- Canadian University Press logo
- Abbreviation: CUP
- Formation: 1938
- Type: Organizations based in Canada
- Legal status: active
- Purpose: advocate and public voice, educator and network
- Headquarters: Toronto, Ontario, Canada
- Region served: Canada
- Members: 55 student newspapers at post-secondary schools in Canada (as of November 2013)
- Official language: English, French
- Affiliations: National Union of Students, National Student Press Week
- Website: http://www.cup.ca www.cup.ca

Canadian University Press is a non-profit co-operative and newswire service owned by more than 50 student newspapers at post-secondary schools in Canada. Founded in 1938, CUP is the oldest student newswire service in the world and the oldest national student organization in North America. Many successful Canadian journalists got their starts in CUP and its member papers. CUP began as a syndication services that facilitated transnational story-sharing. This newswire continued as a private function until 2010 when it was turned into a competitive source for campus news in the form of an online public wire at cupwire.ca.

CUP's head office is in Toronto. Prior to April 1995, the head office was located in Ottawa. In Ottawa, CUP ran a printing company, called Common Printing Group, which was owned jointly with the National Union of Students, which was located in the same building as CUP for several years.

A national conference, which doubles as an annual general meeting, is held once a year in a different city. Each member paper exercises one vote at conferences. The president and national bureau chief are elected at the national conference, or NASH, while the regional CUPboard members are either elected via online referendum, or at regional conferences held in the spring. Each region has an annual event subsidy which can be used to host events within the region, or jointly with other regions. This usually takes the form of regional conferences held in the spring and in the fall. January 2011 will mark CUP's first fully bilingual national conference, in Montreal, hosted in part by the McGill Daily and Le Delit.

The current structure for CUP, of a permanent newswire offered to Canadian University newspapers including the full-time president, was established at CUP 22 in Quebec City in 1959. Prior to this date the service was looser and more oriented towards an exchange of clippings between the papers. One of the delegates at CUP 22 was future Canadian prime minister, Joe Clark, representing the University of Alberta paper, The Gateway.

CUP is divided into six regions: WRCUP (Western, including British Columbia and Yukon), PNCUP (Prairies and Northern, including Alberta, Manitoba, Northwest Territories, Nunavut and Saskatchewan), ORCUP (Ontario), CUPbeq (Quebec), ARCUP (Atlantic, including New Brunswick, Newfoundland and Labrador, Nova Scotia and Prince Edward Island), and PUC (Presse Universitaire Canadienne, including all French language members regardless of geography). Other acronyms for regions include CUPberta (Alberta), and CCUP (Central CUP, Saskatchewan and Manitoba). It also has four special issues caucuses to promote diversity, address the under-representation of marginalized groups and encourage discussion of social issues: Colour Caucus; Disabilities Caucus; Queer, Trans and Allies Caucus; and Women's Caucus.

Member papers contribute articles to the CUP wire, which also runs stories authored by CUP staff. There are news, features, opinions, arts, sports, and graphics wires. After stories are edited by the national bureau chief, they are made available on the wire for publication in CUP member papers.

CUP formerly owned a multi-market ad placement agency, Canadian University Press Media Services Limited, which operates as Campus Plus, offering advertisers one-stop access to student newspapers. Campus Plus declared bankruptcy in 2013. Until 2007, CUP was the sole member of the John H. McDonald Journalism Foundation, a charity named after CUP's first president. Though the charity has been folded, it lives on through the yearly John H. McDonald Student Journalism Awards.

In 2005, CUP declared the last full week of every January, Sunday to Saturday, would be observed as National Student Press Week to celebrate the achievements, diversity and freedom of the student press.

== National and regional staff ==
Now and in recent years, the national bureau chief has also served as CUP's vice-president. In some previous years, the national executive was made up of three or four staff and also included a national features editor (who also held the title of vice-president) or national affairs writer. These staffers held their positions at the conference listed and were elected at the previous conference. In CUP's early days, the titles of president and secretary were awarded at a conference to a newspaper, which would then fill those roles from among staff members.

Currently, the national office staff consists of a single national executive, Jane Lytvynenko, who combines the functions of president and national bureau chief. Until the spring of 2014, the national office staff consisted of the president, who oversaw CUP's finances and administration, and the national bureau chief, who managed its part-time editorial staff and curated the CUP wire service.

Part-time editorial staff consists of six regional bureau chiefs (British Columbia, Prairies and Northern, Ontario, Ottawa, Quebec and Atlantic) and at least four section editors (arts and features, opinions and humour, sports, and French). CUP also employs a communications manager, a translator, and two special issues coordinators (queer and anti-racism). In order to organize the national conference each year, CUP hires two conference coordinators and one awards coordinator.

== Board of directors ==
Until the early 2000s, CUP was administered and controlled between national conferences by only the president and other national office staff. While the staff was required to execute the will of members are agreed upon at plenary, many major decisions could be made by the national office on its own. After the Agent Magazine problems, a movement spearheaded by staffers at The Ontarion drafted and approved a motion calling for the creation of a CUP Board of Directors. Approved at NASH 63, the board guarantees every region at least one director. Any region with 20 or more member papers receives an additional director. All directors are elected at the plenary of their spring regional conference.

At NASH 69 in Vancouver, CUP membership voted to add the position of a continuity representative to the board of directors as a voting member. Subsequently, at NASH 70 in Ottawa, this position was made into an ex-officio member of the board of directors. A staff member (President/NBC/Regional Director) from the previous year fills the position. It was created as an attempt to stabilize CUP's leadership since it goes through an almost yearly changeover.

Currently, the board of directors consists of six regional directors (Western, Prairies, Quebec, Atlantic, and two Ontario directors), along with a national Francophone director, an industry advisor, and the continuity representative.

Subsequent changes have changed the governance landscape on the CUP board of directors. As of NASH78, the board of directors structure has been adjusted to a 12-member board, consisting of the following positions;

Executive Positions	Non-Executive Positions
President & Chair	Atlantic Regional Representative
Vice President	Ontario Regional Representative
HR Officer	Quebec Regional Representative
Communications Officer	Prairie North Regional Representative
Secretary	Western Regional Representative
Treasurer	Continuity Representative

Additional changes voted in by the membership included removing all industry advisors from the board, and removing the president as a paid staff member, instead confirming the president as chair of the board. Relevant bylaw changes are being prepared by the board of directors for NASH79.

== Conferences ==
Every year since its inception, CUP has held a national conference, also known as NASH. The conference moves around the country and serves as the annual general meeting of the organization. It also features a number of training seminars and high-profile keynote speakers. The New Year's Eve parties were sometimes raucous events, as the new year was rung in five times to mark each of the nation's time zones. The extinguishing of a motel fire put a damper on the party at North Bay, Ontario, on the last day of 1983.

NASH has also served as the platform for the John H. McDonald Awards for Excellence in Student Journalism, also known as the Johnnies, since 2003. Inspired by the National Newspaper Awards, the vision of the awards is to "celebrate and reward the excellence that can be found in so many publications at universities and colleges across the country." Any student whose work has been published in a student publication may be nominated for an award. There are currently 21 award categories, which cover different types of reporting (such as news, arts, features, sports, opinions, and some of their French counterparts), art and photography, design, and a new category for Most Promising Student Journalist.

NASH78 was organized by CUP staff and held in Toronto, Ontario. At that conference, the Brunswickan (University of New Brunswick) successfully bid to host the next conference, NASH78, in Fredericton, New Brunswick. NASH79 is scheduled for 4–8 January 2017 with the theme "START UP".

CUP also encourages member papers to host smaller regional conferences each year for the Western, Ontario, Prairie & Northern, Quebec, and Atlantic regions. Regional conferences have recently been held in the Ontario and Atlantic regions as of 2016.

In 2022, The Concordian hosted NASH84, online due to the COVID-19 pandemic. The theme for NASH84 was "Evolve," and featured many multimedia and independent journalists to discuss the evolving modern landscape of journalism. The 2022 conference featured over 70 prominent journalists from across North America including Brian Stelter of CNN, Jesse Brown of CANADALAND, Anita Li of The Green Line, Jason Chiu of The New York Times (a former Graphics Bureau Chief for CUP), and many others.

== Partnerships ==
In April 2013, CUP signed a three-year agreement with a new national advertising partner called FREE Media. The marketing group was co-founded as a division of the independent national advertising agency FREE by two CUP alumni, former Gateway business staffers Ashleigh Brown and Vikram Seth.

CUP's previous national advertising representative was Campus Plus (officially Canadian University Press Media Services Ltd.) which was formed in 1980 and closed in June 2013 after declaring bankruptcy. Campus Plus' bankruptcy trustee MNP took charge of collections in the months that followed and issued payouts to member papers.

CUP is partnered with CWA Canada, a division of Communications Workers of America, a union which "advances the economic interests of its members, improves their standard of living, and strives to guarantee equal job opportunities and human rights." CUP members may join CWA Canada as an associate member in order to join its mentorship program with professional journalists, attend training and networking courses and events, and seek opportunities for internships and freelance work. The CWA representative for CUP also helps members coordinate training opportunities at their publication.

CUP also has partnerships with Journalists for Human Rights, Marketwired, and ScribbleLive.

== Financial crisis of 2014 ==
In March 2014, CUP launched a 42-day fundraising campaign on the platform Indiegogo in an attempt to raise $50,000 toward its operating budget after finding itself in a financial crisis. Beginning 1 March, all 12 of CUP's part-time staff members (including section editors and regional bureau chiefs) were laid off, and the president and national bureau chief received cuts to their salaries and benefits.

After an audit by the Canada Revenue Agency, CUP was forced to pay $9,000 for incorrect taxes. It was then discovered that the organization was projecting its third deficit in a row, this time for $7,000. With all of its savings now spent, CUP stated that "with no reserves to draw on, it's imperative for the existence of CUP to take action now."

The crisis comes not long after 10 members of CUP left in September 2013, resulting in a 15 per cent drop in total membership, due to complaints over high membership costs. CUP may also see further trouble as a number of those member publications have now formed a service called the National University Wire similar to and rivaling the CUP wire. The most recent CUP national conference in Edmonton, Alta. also attracted fewer than the expected number of delegates and therefore did not generate as much revenue as expected. Additionally, the demise of Campus Plus left CUP with fewer dividends to generate income. With all this having taken place in a relatively short period of time, CUP lost more than $70,000 in three years and ended up in financial and existential crisis with just more than $1,500 in the bank before the fundraising campaign.

== CUP Presidents ==
- CUP 86 Andrew Mrozowski (The Silhouette)
- CUP 85 Mélina Nantel
- CUP 84 Jacob Dubé
- CUP 75 Erin Hudson (The McGill Daily)
- CUP 74 Sam Brooks (The Gateway)
- CUP 73 Erin Cauchi (The Strand)
- CUP 72 Rob Fishbook (the Fulcrum)
- CUP 71 Rob Fishbook (the Fulcrum)
- CUP 70 Amanda McCuaig (the Peak)
- CUP 69 Erin Millar (the Capilano Courier)
- CUP 68 Sean Patrick Sullivan (the Martlet/the Brunswickan)
- CUP 67 Chris Dinn (the Muse)
- CUP 66 Craig Battle (the Martlet)
- CUP 65 Anya Spethmann (the Brock Press)
- CUP 64 Don Iveson (the Gateway)
- CUP 63 Jeremy Nelson (the Manitoban)
- CUP 62 Tariq Hassan-Gordon (the Arthur)
- CUP 61 Tariq Hassan-Gordon (the Arthur)
- CUP 60 Jen Horsey (the Dalhousie Gazette)
- CUP 59 Judy Reid (the Dalhousie Gazette)
- CUP 58 Joanna Shepherd (the Watch)
- CUP 57 David Matthews (The Athenaeum)
- CUP 56 Alayne Armstrong (the Manitoban)
- CUP 55 Dawn Mitchell (the Muse)
- CUP 54 John Montesano (Excalibur)
- CUP 53 Francesca Lodico (the Concordia Link)
- CUP 52 Deanne Fisher (the Ubyssey)
- CUP 51 Lynn Marchildon (the Charlatan)
- CUP 50 Gilbert Dong (the Manitoban)
- CUP 49 Diane Dyson (the Link)/ Donna Mayer (Lambda)
- CUP 48 Martha Muzychka(the Muse)
- CUP 47 Andre Picard (the Fulcrum)
- CUP 46 Gerry Porter (the Muse)
- CUP 45 Julie Wheelwright (the Ubyssey)
- CUP 44 John Parsons (the Muse)
- CUP 43 Michael Balagus (the Projector, Red River College)
- CUP 42 Maureen McEvoy (the Peak)
- CUP 41 John Wilson
- CUP 40 Susan Johnson (the Chevron)
- CUP 39 Tom Benjamin
- CUP 37 Francis Fuca
- CUP 36 Bob Beal
- CUP 35 Dorothy Wigmore (Dalhousie Gazette)
- CUP 34 Liz Willick
- CUP 32 Stewart Saxe (the Chevron)
- CUP 31 Kevin Peterson (the Gauntlet)
- CUP 30 Lib Spry (the Sheaf) (CUP's first female president)
- CUP 29 Don Sellar
- CUP 28 James Laxer
- CUP 27 John MacFarlane
- CUP 26 Sidney Y. Black (The Coryphaeus) (subject of the derogatory Ballad of Sidney Y. Black)
- CUP 25 Roger McAfee (the Ubyssey)
- CUP 24 E.R. (Ted) Johnson (Silhouette)
- CUP 23 Doug Parkinson (Silhouette)
- CUP 22 Doug Parkinson (Silhouette)
- CUP 21 John Gray (the Varsity)
- CUP 12 Murray Smith (Manitoban)
- CUP 9 Jack Ferry
- CUP 8 Charles Wasserman (McGill Daily)
- CUP 7 H.A. Richter (McGill Daily)
- CUP 1 John H. McDonald (the McGill Daily)

== CUP National Bureau Chiefs and other National Office staff ==
The national bureau chief also served as CUP's vice-president. In some previous years, the national executive was made up of three or four staff and also included a national features editor (who also held the title of vice-president) or national affairs writer. These staffers held their positions at the conference listed and were elected at the previous conference. In CUP's early days, the titles of president and secretary were awarded at a conference to a newspaper, which would then fill those roles from among staff members.

The NBC position ended in 2014.

- CUP 75 Brendan Kergin (the Nexus)
- CUP 74 Arshy Mann (the Ubyssey)
- CUP 73 Danielle Webb (the Xaverian Weekly)
- CUP 72 Josh O'Kane (the Brunswickan)
- CUP 71 Sheena Goodyear (the Muse)
- CUP 70 William Wolfe-Wylie (the Argosy)
- CUP 69 Bryna Hallam (the Martlet)
- CUP 68 Dave Weatherall (the Link)
- CUP 67 Stephen Hui (the Peak)
- CUP 66 Chris Wilson-Smith (the Brunswickan)
- CUP 65 Shawn Jeffords (the Excalibur); Ira Dubinsky and Kelly Nestruck (national conference coordinators) (McGill Daily)
- CUP 64 Dave Leibl (the Manitoban)
- CUP 63 Patti Edgar (the Martlet)
- CUP 62 Alex Bustos (national bureau chief) (the Ubyssey)
- CUP 61 Craig Saunders (national co-ordinator) (the Carillon); Idella Sturino (national bureau chief) (McGill Daily)
- CUP 60 David Alan Barry (national bureau chief) (the Varsity); Tracy Frauzel (national co-ordinator) (the Fulcrum)
- CUP 59 Stu Clark (national bureau chief) (the Carillon)
- CUP 58 Stu Clark (national bureau chief) (the Carillon)
- CUP 57 Eugenia Xenos (national bureau chief) (the Concordia Link)
- CUP 56 Doug Saunders (national bureau chief)(excalibur); Miranda Gray (national conference organizer) (the Fulcrum)
- CUP 55 Monique Beaudin (national bureau chief) (the Charlatan)
- CUP 54 Karen Hill (national bureau chief) (the Varsity); Jeff Harrington (national features writer) (the Dalhousie Gazette)
- CUP 53 Andy Riga (national bureau chief) (the Concordia Link); John Montesano (national conference organizer) (excalibur)
- CUP 52 Chris Lawson (national bureau chief) (McGill Daily)
- CUP 51 Tu Thanh Ha (national bureau chief) (the Concordia Link)
- CUP 50 Michelle Lalonde (national bureau chief) (The Fulcrum)
- CUP 49 John Gushue (national bureau chief) (the Muse), Melinda Wittstock (McGill Daily) (vice-president/features writer)
- CUP 48 Peter Kuitenbrouwer (national bureau chief) (McGill Daily), Samantha Brennan (Dalhousie Gazette) (vice-president/features writer)
- CUP 47 Muriel Draaisma (national bureau chief) (the Ubyssey), Danielle Comeau (The Manitoban) (vice-president/features writer)
- CUP 46 Glen Sanford (national bureau chief) (the Ubyssey), Cathy MacDonald (Dalhousie Gazette) (vice-president/features writer)
- CUP 45 Jim McElgunn (national bureau chief), Rick Janson (the Fulcrum)(vice-president/features writer)
- CUP 44 Rosemary Oliver
- CUP 43 Cathy Smith (national bureau chief), Michael McEvoy (vice-president/features writer) (the Uniter)
- CUP 42 Bill Tieleman (national bureau chief) (the Ubyssey), Phil Hurcomb (vice-president)
- CUP 41 Victor Salus (national bureau chief) (the Gauntlet), Alayne McGregor (vice-president and national features writer) (the Manitoban)
- CUP 40 Larry Black (national bureau chief) (McGill Daily), Sue Vohanka (vice-president) (the Ubyssey), Ann Silversides (national affairs reporter) (the Varsity), Dave Colburn (wire editor)
- CUP 39 Kris Klaasen (national bureau chief)(The Gauntlet), Tom Benjamin (president) Dan Keeton (vice-president), Joan Shields (features editor) (the McGill Daily), Pat Daley (wire editor) (The Charlatan)
- CUP 32 George Russell (bureau chief), Ronald Thompson (vice-president)
- CUP 31 Elly Alboim (national bureau chief) (McGill Daily), Allen Garr (vice-president/accounting) (the Peak), Bob Parkins (field secretary) (the Varsity)
- CUP 30 John Lynn (National Bureau Chief) (The Georgian), John Dufour (Finance)(McGill Daily)
- CUP 29 Barry Rust (secretary)
- CUP 27 James Laxer (first vice-president)
- CUP 25 Denis de Belleval (vice-president) (Le Carabin), Frank Mazari (national secretary) (the Varsity)
- CUP 9 Bob Mungall (national secretary) (The Ubyssey)

== CUP Board of Directors ==
CUP 72 Board

- Chair Justin Bell, the Prairies and Northern Region Director (Intercamp)
- Vice Chair Kerri Breen, the Atlantic Region Director (The Muse)
- Treasurer Brendan Kergin, the Western Region Director (The Nexus)
- Human Resources Rep Frank Appleyard, an Ontario Regional Director (The Fulcrum)
- Meghan Lawson, an Ontario Region Director (The Strand)
- Ben Ngai, the Quebec Regional Director (The Concordian)
- Camila Juarez, National Francophone Director (La Rotonde)
- Sheena Goodyear, the Continuity Representative(Former National Bureau Chief)

CUP 71 Board

- Chair Ricardo Bortolon, Ricardo Bortolon, the Western Region Director (The Ubyssey)
- Vice Chair Matt Skube, the Atlantic Region Director (The Xavarian Weekly)
- Treasurer Jared Book, the Quebec Region Director (The Concordian)
- Human Resources Rep Justin Bell, the Prairies and Northern Region Director (Intercamp)
- Campus Plus Board Rep Matt Skube, the Atlantic Region Director (The Xavarian Weekly)
- Erin Cauchi, an Ontario Region Director (The Strand)
- Frank Appleyard, an Ontario Regional Director (The Fulcrum)
- Rachelle McDuff, National Francophone Director (Quartier Libre)
- Amanda McCuaig, the Continuity Representative Director (The Peak)

CUP 70 Board

- Chair Tessa Vanderhart, the Prairies and Northern Region Director (The Manitoban)
- Vice Chair Ricardo Bortolon, the Western Region Director (The Peak/The Ubyssey)
- Treasurer Erin Millar, the Continuity Representative Director (The Capilano Courier)
- Human Resources Rep Vanessa Larkey, an Ontario Region Director (The Underground)
- Campus Plus Board Rep Jason Chiu, an Ontario Region Director (The Fulcrum and La Rotonde)
- Angie Barrington, the Atlantic Region Director (The Muse)
- Tracey Lindeman Jarvis, the Quebec Region Director (The Link)

CUP 69 Board

- Chair Ross Prusakowski the Prairies and Northern Region Director (The Gateway)
- Vice Chair Tracey Lindeman-Jarvis the Quebec Region Director (The Link)
- Treasurer Fraser McCracken an Ontario Region Director (The Cord Weekly)
- Human Resources Rep Mark Cluett the Atlantic Region Director (The Muse)
- Meaghan McBride the Western Region Director (The Cascade)
- Vanessa Larkey an Ontario Region Director (The Underground)

CUP 68 Board

- Chair Mike Barker an Ontario Region Director (The Dialog),
- Vice Chair Ashley Martin the Prairies and Northern Region Director (The Carillon),
- Treasurer Erin Millar the Western Region Director (The Cap Courier),
- Human Resources Rep Johnathan Fleming the Atlantic Region Director (The Athenaeum),
- Misha Warbanski the Quebec Region Director (The Link) and
- Adrian Ma an Ontario Region Director (The Cord Weekly).

CUP 67 Board

- Chair Anna Sarkissian the Quebec Region Director (The Link),
- Vice Chair Jen White the Atlantic Region Director (The Muse),
- Treasurer Andrew Krupowicz an Ontario Region Director (The Mike),
- Human Resources Rep Zoe Bake-Paterson the Western Region Director (The Martlet),
- Michelle Kuly the Prairies Region Director (The Uniter) and
- Emma Sadowski an Ontario Region Director (Excalibur).

CUP 66 Board

- Chair Dave Shipley the Atlantic Region Director (The Baron),
- Vice Chair Steve Faguy the Quebec Region Director (The Link),
- Treasurer Tara Lynn Price an Ontario Region Director (Excalibur),
- Human Resources Rep Kevin Groves the Western Region Director (The Martlet/Ubyssey),
- Anya Spethmann an Ontario Region Director (The Brock Press) and
- Joel Trenaman the Prairies Region Director (The Manitoban).

CUP 65 Board

- Chair Laura Blue the Western Region Director (The Ubyssey),
- Vice Chair Dave "Skip" Zeibin the Prairies Region Director (The Gateway),
- Treasurer Tanya Mustachi an Ontario Region Director (Excalibur),
- Human Resources Rep Kathe Lemon an Ontario Region Director (The Arthur),
- Ben Conoley the Atlantic Region Director (The Brunswickan) and
- Sean Currie the Quebec Region Director (The McGill Daily).

CUP 64 Board

- Chair Dan Lazin the Prairies Region Director (The Gateway),
- Treasurer Laura Blue the Western Region Director (The Ubyssey),
- Human Resources Rep Dave Darling an Ontario Region Director (The Argus),
- Andrey Caric an Ontario Region Director (The Ontarion)
- Jonathan "Kip" Keen the Atlantic Region Director (The Dalhousie Gazette) and
- Joshua Cuppage the Quebec Region Director (The Link).

== See also ==
- Student newspaper
- News agency
- List of student newspapers in Canada
- Agents of social change
- National Student Press Week
