= Agents of social change =

Agents of social change is a phrase once widely used by Canadian student newspapers to describe a doctrine of activist civic journalism.

== Early usages ==
In 1861 an article by Thomas Adolphus Trollope referred to "a far more powerful agent of social change—the Mail".

The phrase was used in 1965 at the annual conference of Canadian University Press in Calgary, when a delegation led by the McGill Daily proposed and passed an amendment to CUP's statement of principles that said "one of the major roles of the student press is to act as an agent of social change." The motion's authors argued that university students, including student journalists, had a special role to play in the social and civil-rights revolutions of the time, and objective reporting could not achieve this. Instead, student journalists had to take sides on social issues, and guide campus opinion accordingly.

CUP's leadership soon realized that being "agents of social change" meant that distanced, objective reporting was impossible. In 1967 CUP removed all prohibitions against "unbiased" reporting from its charter, replacing the word "unbiased" with "fair."

In 1968, CUP fleshed out the 1965 "agents of social change" clause into a longer list of resolutions, reading as follows:

- that the major role of the student press is to act as an agent of social change, striving to emphasize the rights and responsibilities of the student citizen;
- that the student press must in fulfilling this role perform both an educative and an active function as agents of social change;
- that the student press must present local, national and international news fairly, and interpret ideas and events to the best of its ability;
- that the student press must use its freedom from commercial and other controls to ensure that all it does is consistent with its major role and to examine what other media avoid.

== Criticism and decline: 1968-1991 ==
"Agents of social change" and the struggle to interpret it led to frequent clashes between the radical and moderate CUP member papers. To the moderates, the phrase not only excused but encouraged biased reporting, as long as the bias was in favour of so-called progressive causes — causes that sometimes supported violence or illegal activity.

For instance, during the 1975 October Crisis, the CUP national bureau encouraged member papers to publish the FLQ manifesto and write pro-French, anti-War Measures Act articles, because they felt these perspectives were being lost in the mainstream press. In 1985, CUP wrote a list of "liberation organizations" that its national bureau was authorized to support, including the IRA and the PLO. Although member papers were not obligated to print these stories, the move alarmed and disillusioned the moderate papers, some of whom would leave CUP in the years that followed.

After several inconclusive debates on the subject, CUP voted to delete the "agents of social change" clause in 1991, prompting the temporary resignation of the McGill Daily and the Simon Fraser University Peak.

Even though it is no longer official CUP policy, "agents of social change" survives in the constitutions of some CUP member papers, including the Martlet at the University of Victoria, and continues to be debated at CUP conferences.

== See also ==
- Canadian University Press
- Civic journalism
- Student newspaper
- The Charlatan
