= L'Orignal déchaîné =

Student newspaper in Ontario, Canada

L'Orignal déchaîné (The Unchained Moose) is the French language student newspaper at Laurentian University in Sudbury, Ontario, Canada. Its English counterpart is Lambda. Its name is a takeoff on the French satirical publication Le Canard enchaîné.

== History ==
L'Orignal Déchaîné was launched in 1987. The paper ceased publishing in 2022 due to staffing and funding difficulties amid the 2021 Laurentian University financial crisis, but was revived two years later.

== See also ==
- List of student newspapers in Canada
- List of newspapers in Canada
