= The Link (newspaper) =

College newspaper

- Type: Student newspaper
- Format: Tabloid, 27.5 mm x 21mm
- Owner: The Link Publication Society
- Publisher: Hebdo-Litho
- Editor-in-chief: Geneviève Sylvestre
- Founded: August 22, 1980; 45 years ago
- Language: English
- Headquarters: Concordia University, 1455 de Maisonneuve O., Montreal, Quebec; Canada
- Circulation: 5,000
- Website: thelinknewspaper.ca

The Link is an independent, student-run, not-for-profit multi-media publication at Concordia University. The Link publishes a bi-weekly newspaper every other Tuesday during the fall and winter semesters, and publishes online daily through its website.

From 1999 until 2017, The Link published weekly on each Tuesday. In the spring of 2017, The Link and its members voted to transition to a monthly magazine format, and the first issue was published on September 5, 2017. This later changed back in September 2022, The Link reverting to a tabloid format—albeit biweekly.

The Link's mandate is to publish stories not usually covered by mainstream media, and the publication specializes in advocacy journalism. Contributors cover stories about student life, as well as local, national and international issues of interest to the Concordia and Montreal communities.

Its revenue comes from a student fee-levy and both print and online advertising.

== History ==
The Link was founded in 1980 as a merger between The Georgian, representing Sir George Williams University, and The Loyola News, representing Loyola College, when the two schools merged to form Concordia University. The Link was called so because it was meant to link both campuses, and it produced its first by-weekly issue on August 22, 1980. The Link became financially independent from the student council in 1983.

Before becoming The Link, Georgian editor David A. Bowman handed over editorial control of the newspaper to the Black Students' Association in the midst of the 1969 Computer Centre Incident. They produced an issue outlining their grievances with the administration and the content was highly libelous and inflammatory. The RCMP seized most copies of the paper, which would later become known as the Black Georgian because of its black cover. The student council later fired Bowman for "financial and journalistic incompetence."

In 1985, The Link interviewed Hunter S. Thompson, who was scheduled to speak at Concordia. Twenty-eight years later its author, Dwayne Perrault, recounted how he wrote the story in an interview to The Link from his home in Amsterdam.

The Link frequently prints special issues that look in-depth at a particular topic. In 1982, The Link printed its first ever queer special issue, which some students found to be controversial. 5,000 copies of the paper were removed from newsstands by students and destroyed. An issue on gender and sexuality is still printed every year.

On September 14, 1999, prior to G20 summit in Montreal, the newspaper printed a cartoon field guide explaining "how to spot activists" on campus that went along with the message "Everything You Need to Know to be a Dissident in Montreal".

After massive protests greeted a visit by Israeli Prime Minister Benjamin Netanyahu, The Link's production came to a halt in September 2002 as the RCMP evacuated the Hall building and the talk was cancelled. As a result, The Link published its coverage of the events a day late.

In 2011, The Link was the first Canadian university newspaper to become a daily online publication, with a print and online team. Since then The Link has experimented with new digital formats including special issue micro-sites for the 2012 Quebec provincial election, for a special issue on science and technology, for the 2013 Space issue, and for the 2015 International issue.

In 2012, following the death of its first Editor-In-Chief, Doug Leslie, The Link created a bursary in his name to help young student journalists in financial need. The bursary consists of two $500 or one $1,000 grant for deserving staff members of The Link. In the same year, The Link left the Canadian University Press, but later rejoined in 2017 when CUP lowered its membership fees.

In 2015, MTL Blog writer Irina Tee was criticized for allegedly supporting misogyny in her articles and an open-letter demanding the suspension from her writing position at MTL Blog was published on The Link.

In 2025, The Link and fellow Concordia student newspaper, The Concordian, accused the Concordia Student Union (CSU) of abuse of power after they rejected the two newspapers' fee levy increase applications. In an opinion piece co-authored by the two newspapers, speculation of mistreatment "derived from political motive" was tabled as a possible cause.

== Achievements ==
Former photo editor Barbara Davidson and colleagues won the Pulitzer Prize for photographs taken in New Orleans in the aftermath of Hurricane Katrina. In 2011, Davidson won another Pulitzer and an Emmy for her work in the LA Times about people caught in the crossfire of Los Angeles gang violence.

In 2012, The Link won a John H. McDonald Award at the Canadian University Press' annual conference for photos taken from the Occupy Montreal protests in October 2011. In the same year, The Link broke a story about the substandard living conditions of international students at Concordia, which later gained national attention.

The Link was nominated for eight JHM award in 2013, ultimately bringing home four awards: Riley Sparks' Taken for a Ride uncovering poor living conditions of Chinese students at Concordia University, Oliver Leon's column That Transexxual Guy, tackling the issues and everyday life of transition and trans* rights, Sam Slotnick's Tipping Point photo showing masked demonstrators attacking a bystander during the 2012 Montreal anti-police brutality march and Colin Harris' profile of Canadian band King Khan.

In 2016, The Link won a JHM award for best website. The following year, four staff members won the JHM award for best cover, for their work on the "First Nations, Last Pipeline." Former fringe editor Marie Brière de la Hosseraye also won in the arts category for her piece "The Final Chapter," which told the tragic disappearance of a local bookstore owner.

In 2018, The Link won two more JHM awards. Former video editor Brian Lapuz won the photo award for photos taken at a 2017 anti-police brutality march, and former managing editor Jon Milton won for best opinion writing for his article "After Quebec City, Make Racists Afraid Again," published in February 2017.

== See also ==
- List of student newspapers in Canada
- List of newspapers in Canada
