= The Martlet =

Canadian student newspaper

- Type: Bi-monthly student newspaper
- Format: Tabloid
- Editor: Ethan Barkley (Volume 78)
- Founded: 1948
- Language: English
- Circulation: 5,000 (per issue)
- Website: www.martlet.ca

The Martlet is a student newspaper published online every two weeks at the University of Victoria (UVic) in Victoria, British Columbia, Canada.

The first edition of the Martlet was printed on December 3, 1948. For much of its history, it was published twice weekly. It cut back its print edition to monthly with the COVID-19 pandemic.

== Publication ==
The Martlet is the only general-interest campus newspaper at the University of Victoria. It regularly reports on UVic Board of Governors and Senate meetings, as well as University of Victoria Students' Society Board meetings and elections. The free printed monthly newspaper is distributed around the UVic campus and various locations around greater Victoria. It produces an online edition every two weeks during the school year, and occasionally produces breaking news. The Martlet has a wide circulation and can be found in coffee shops, theatres, grocery stores, offices, and street corners throughout Victoria, British Columbia. The newspaper maintains its strong editorial line and commitment to politics and activism.

The Martlet is slowly converting to web-only content, as are news media worldwide. 5,000 printed copies are circulated around the UVic campus and the local community, and the Martlet has over 3,600 followers on X (Twitter) and 1,900 on Facebook. www.martlet.ca receives an annual average of 30,000 audience members via organic web search, and 17,000 audience members via social media channels. Martlet stories are regularly picked up by larger publications including the CBC, CTV News, the Times Colonist, and Chek News.

== History ==
In 1938, the Martlet was originally founded at Victoria College as the Microscope, a student newsletter from 1938–1940. The Microscope was published as a four-page printed newspaper format from 1946–1948.

On 3 December 1948, the newspaper was renamed to the Martlet. The paper takes its name from a heraldic bird with no feet. Three martlet birds appear on the crest of McGill University, and the University of Victoria grew out of the McGill University College of British Columbia. The name was proposed by second-year student Donn Carmichael. Member's of the Students' Council and the editorial board of the paper voted 8-5 in favour of the new name. The final vote was between "The Martlet" and "The Viking". The Martlet continued through the transition of the College into the University of Victoria in 1963.

In the 1960s, George Manning began his newspaper career as the Martlet's publication director. He would later become a major figure in Vancouver Island journalism, co-founding the Goldstream Gazette as well as the Lake Cowichan Gazette, community newspapers now owned by Black Press.

For a brief period in the early 1970s, the Martlet was renamed the 'Cougar City Gazette' after an armed takeover by a loose coalition of disgruntled former students and at least one former(?) professor who were dissatisfied with the perceived blandness of the newspaper - perusal of the content of the Cougar City Gazette clearly reflects the change of editorial direction. The Cougar City Gazette was often quite controversial, and it closed suddenly after it published a captioned photograph that caused Playboy magazine to threaten the paper with legal action.

In 1971, the Martlet was partly responsible for bringing about the resignation of the university's president, Bruce J. Partridge, when it erroneously reported that he had obtained his law degree from a correspondence school under investigation as a "degree mill." In 2001, the Martlet Publishing Society issued an apology to Partridge for publishing articles that made reference to these events in an anniversary book. A 2003 Martlet article by Patrick White stated that, though Partridge legitimately acquired his degree by correspondence, rumours about Partridge's qualifications spread throughout the university. Partially due to the Martlet's reporting, Partridge resigned in November 1971.

In 1994, the Martlet gained financial autonomy from the student union and began managing its own finances.

Until 2004, the Martlet had an "advertising boycott list", which has been dropped to allow each individual advertisement to be assessed. The Martlet has received criticism for running advertisements that some readers have interpreted as sexist, notably in fall 2004 when they ran ads for "Canada's Search for the Coors Light Maxim Girl."

In 2013, the Martlet Publishing Society voted to leave the Canadian University Press. It subsequently became a member of the former National University Wire, which consisted of other student publications including Ubyssey (University of British Columbia), McGill Daily, the Gazette (Western University), Dalhousie Gazette, and the Varsity (University of Toronto).

In 2017, the Martlet briefly crossposted its articles on the online publishing platform Medium.

== Organization ==
As of 2023, each full-time student pays C$3.75 per semester to the Martlet through student union dues. The student-run publication is primarily funded by student fees, advertisements, and grants.

The Martlet Publishing Society is a non-profit society governed by a volunteer-run, five-position board of directors. All staff, paid or otherwise, must answer to the board, and all students may attend board meetings. There are about 10 employees on the payroll, with significant work, including copy-editing, photography, and writing, done by student volunteers. The Editor-in-Chief and Operations Manager are full-time employees.

Its sponsoring bodies have been the Victoria College Alma Mater Society and its successors, the University of Victoria Alma Mater Society, and currently the University of Victoria Students' Society.

== Notable alumni ==
Many national journalists and columnists in Canada have gotten their start at the Martlet, and it continues to produce opportunities for student writers to become professionals. Martleteers have gone on to become journalists and editors at the National Post, Toronto Star, The Globe and Mail, Edmonton Journal, Times Colonist, and other Canadian news outlets. Notable alumni include novelist W.P. Kinsella, former Victoria Mayor Lisa Helps, and former leader of the B.C. Green Party Andrew Weaver. Pierre Berton was an assistant editor and principle cartoonist for the Microscope.

== See also ==
- List of student newspapers in Canada
- List of newspapers in Canada
- The Ring - UVic's community newspaper, published by UVic Communications
- Nexus - A student newspaper from neighbouring Camosun College

== References and works cited ==
- Article on Newspaper
- Apology to Bruce Partridge
- Martlet article on UVic scandals
- Ubyssey article from 1971(includes article on page 3 about Bruce Partridge)
- Op-ed on Coors Maxim sexism debate and some letters on the issue
