= The Runner (newspaper) =

Independent student newspaper of Kwantlen Polytechnic University

- Type: Semi-weekly newspaper (monthly in summer)
- Owner(s): Polytechnic Ink; Publishing Society
- Editor: Sukhmani Sandhu
- Associate editor: Cypher Neri
- Founded: 2008
- Headquarters: Kwantlen Polytechnic University, Metro Vancouver, British Columbia, Canada; Arbutus 3710; 12666 72 Ave. Surrey, B.C. V3W 2M8
- ISSN: 1916-8241
- Website: runnermag.ca

The Runner is the independent student newspaper of Kwantlen Polytechnic University's 17,500-plus students, faculty and staff across Surrey, Richmond, and Langley. It publishes 18 issues each year, on a bi-weekly schedule from September to April, and every three weeks from May through August.

== Background ==
The Runner first published in early 2009 after a successful February 2008 Kwantlen Student Association referendum for "a freely distributed, year-round, multi-campus, student-owned, student-run news and campus culture publication", which approved a $0.75 per credit levy that is refundable to students who may "opt out". Other funds supplement The Runner through advertisement sales.

It has formal, exclusive financial and editorial autonomy from the Kwantlen Student Association. Such autonomy avoids press freedom hindrance, where student unions or post-secondary institutions attempt to exert control over the content or funding of a student newspaper that commits journalism in the public interest.

The Runner has covered stories about the Kwantlen Student Association, including the infamous RAF (Reduce All Fees) scandal.

== Organization ==
A board of directors maintains the general direction of The Runner. It is the independent oversight for both editorial and business divisions. It functions under the umbrella of British Columbia's Society Act as a registered non-profit society named Polytechnic Ink Publishing Society (abbreviated as PIPS). Kwantlen students are the voting members of the society, and they may opt out from it and receive a refund of their fee payment.

Runner editors are elected each June by the paper's "Contributors". Collectively, Contributors make up the society's editorial division and vote on all aspects of editorial policies, content and views. Contributors are student writers, photographers and illustrators who have had three of their submissions published within The Runner or other PIPS publications over the course of a calendar year.

The Runner also employs an operations manager who coordinates society human resources, day-to-day functions, and is in charge of the society's Business Division. The operations manager is not a board member, but attends meetings, and generally serves the society with its institutional memory.

== See also ==
- Canadian University Press
- List of student newspapers in Canada
- List of newspapers in Canada
- Kwantlen Polytechnic University
