= Nathan White (journalist) =

Canadian journalist

Nathan White is a journalist and communications professional known primarily for his work in sports. He currently serves as Senior Manager, Communications for Swimming Canada and was previously Marketing/Communications Manager for the Saint John Sea Dogs of the Quebec Major Junior Hockey League during their championship seasons of 2011 and 2012.

As a journalist, his work has been featured by The Hockey News, Yahoo! Sports, The Globe and Mail, National Post, The Sporting News, and several other Canadian newspapers, magazines and websites. White covered sports, business, provincial news, technology and arts for the New Brunswick Telegraph-Journal from 2005 to 2009. He was the QMJHL beat reporter from 2008 to 2009. He served as the color commentator on the official CKNI-FM radio broadcast of the QMJHL's Moncton Wildcats from 2006 to 2008. White was president of the Canadian Association of Journalists chapter in New Brunswick from 2007 to 2009.

White's management of Sea Dogs TV was recognized with the Hottest YouTube Award at the 2012 Saint John Saltys social media awards. His writing earned him an honorable mention in the Creative Non-Fiction category of the 2012 New Brunswick Writers' Federation contest. In 2008, White was named one of New Brunswick's 21 Leaders for the 21st century by the organization 21 Inc. In 2007, he received the 2006 Jim MacNeill Best New Journalist Award at the 26th Annual Atlantic Journalism Awards.

The founding editor of Fred, an alternative newspaper in Fredericton, White also served as managing editor of The Brunswickan, the University of New Brunswick's student newspaper and the oldest official student publication in Canada. He was a recipient of a John H. MacDonald Award for Excellence in Student Journalism awarded by the Canadian University Press in 2004.
