= The Muse (student paper) =

Student newspaper in Newfoundland and Labrador

The Muse is the student publication of the Memorial University of Newfoundland. The successor to the Memorial Times, it began publishing in 1950 in St. John's, Newfoundland and Labrador, Canada, as an unnamed paper. That paper held a contest to choose a new name, the winner being a professor who named the paper after all of the following:

- a bastardization of the Greek letters Μ and υ, for Memorial University;
- a reference to the Greek goddesses of the arts;
- a joke, saying this was MU's (Memorial University's) paper;
- and the role of a paper as a place where students could muse.
- an acronym, standing for "Memorial University Student Editorial"

Beginning with a small editorial staff controlled by the student union, The Muse grew into an autonomous student-run paper. In the early years of publication, it was a campus gossip tabloid; in the late 1960s it developed an activist flair which attracted the attention of the provincial government and the Royal Canadian Mounted Police (RCMP), with the latter including The Muse in their investigations of supposedly Marxist organizations. In the late eighties, the paper was enlivened by the women's movement, and followed a more activist agenda, including special coverage of gay, lesbian and bisexual issues not discussed in the mainstream media, and a boycotted list of advertisers. The Muse incorporated in 2002 as The Muse Publications Inc, and became fully autonomous from the Memorial University students' union in January 2003.

The Muse focuses on campus life, Newfoundland and Labrador, university research, campus, municipal, provincial and federal politics, local music and sports, and periodically reports on world politics and social justice.

Before The Muse went online, during the fall and winter semesters The Muse distributed 12,000 copies a week to various parts of multiple campuses, and throughout St. John's. Circulation ceased during the summer months.

The Muse was a member of Canadian University Press (CUP), a non-profit co-operative and newswire service owned by about 70 student newspapers at post-secondary schools in Canada.

In January 2004, the Muse hosted the Canadian University Press national conference (CUP 66) for the first time in the paper's history. The conference was awarded to The Muse over The Gateway of the University of Alberta at the Montreal CUP conference in 2003 (CUP 65). The conference was held at the Fairmont Newfoundland Hotel.

Many writers with The Muse have gone on to successful careers - not only in journalism, but in arts, business, music, law and politics.

At CUP 71, held in Saskatoon during January 2009, the Muse officially became the sister paper of the Fulcrum at the University of Ottawa. The two papers are no longer in contact. In fall of 2017, after 7-8 years of cutting the size of the print paper, due to budgetary constraints, the chief editor announced plans to stop print production of The Muse. Since then, The Muse has only been available online. However, archives of the printed paper from 1950 to 2017 can be found on their website.

In September 2026, the Muse has started releasing print copies again, as of the "Sex Drugs and Rock n' Roll" issue, that can be found around the campus.

== Well-known Muse contributors ==
- Steve Bartlett: Reporter with St. John's Telegram
- Donna Butt: Newfoundland actress and co-founder of Rising Tide Theatre
- Michael Connors: NTV evening news reporter and occasional anchor
- Ron Crocker: former regional director of CBC in Atlantic Canada
- Gwynne Dyer: journalist and author
- Fred Gamberg: late promoter of local music acts
- Bill Gillespie: CBC international correspondent
- John Gushue: CBC writer, broadcaster and Telegram columnist
- Bob Hallett: Great Big Sea multi-instrumentalist
- Peter Jackson: editorial page editor with the St. John's daily newspaper The Telegram
- Wayne Johnston: author of The Divine Ryans and The Colony of Unrequited Dreams
- Doug Letto: CBC: Here and Now senior producer
- Art May: Former president of Memorial University
- Earle McCurdy: president of the Fish, Food and Allied Workers Union (FFAW/CAW)
- Michael Rossiter: CBC Radio political reporter, producer
- Wallace Ryan: Newfoundland artist and ardent nationalist
- Greg Thomey: co-creator and former co-host of CBC's This Hour Has 22 Minutes
- Brian Tobin: former Newfoundland and Labrador premier,
- Clyde Wells: former Newfoundland and Labrador premier and Court of Appeal Chief Justice

== See also ==
- List of student newspapers in Canada
- List of newspapers in Canada
