= National Student Press Week =

Annual event in Canada

National Student Press Week is a week-long observance celebrating the achievements, diversity and freedom of the student press in Canada. It also provides an opportunity to educate students and the public about the important role the student press plays on Canadian university and college campuses, and in building the future of Canadian journalism. It takes places on the last full week of every January.

It was established on January 24, 2005, by members of the Canadian University Press—a co-operative and newswire service composed of about 70 student newspapers—during its 67th national conference in Edmonton, Alberta.

== History ==
It was established on January 24, 2005, by members of the Canadian University Press—a co-operative and newswire service composed of about 70 student newspapers—during its 67th national conference in Edmonton, Alberta, when they unanimously declared the last full week of every January, Sunday to Saturday, to be National Student Press Week.

The first annual National Student Press Week was observed in 2005 from 23 January to 29 January. The city of Prince George, British Columbia, became the first jurisdiction to formally recognize National Student Press Week in February 2005. The Cape Breton Regional Municipality, Nova Scotia, followed with a proclamation in March. Other governments across Canada also proclaimed National Student Press Week that year.

== See also ==
- Student newspaper
- Canadian University Press
- List of student newspapers in Canada
