= Nathan White =

Nathan White may refer to:

- Nathan White (journalist), Canadian sportswriter
- Nathan White (rugby union) (born 1981), New Zealand-born rugby union player
- Nate White (1910–1984), journalist for the Christian Science Monitor
