= Journalism Education Association =

American nonprofit organization

- Formation: 1924
- Headquarters: Manhattan, Kansas, United States
- Members: 2,559
- President: Valerie Kibler, MJE
- Vice President: Justin Daigle, MJE
- Executive Director: Veronica Holmes Purvis, CAE
- Website: www.jea.org

The US Journalism Education Association (JEA) is a US-based national organization for teachers and advisers of journalism. National organizations of the same name exist in Australia and New Zealand.

== History ==
JEA is a 501(c)3 organization that in 2015 reported income of $1.7 million and assets of $1.5 million. It was founded in 1924, becoming incorporated in the state of Minnesota in 1967. It reincorporated in the state of Kansas in 2014.

== About ==
JEA's mission statement is to support "free and responsible scholastic journalism by providing resources and educational opportunities, by promoting professionalism, by encouraging and rewarding student excellence and teacher achievement, and by fostering an atmosphere which encompasses diversity yet builds unity." It outlines its "core values" as

- Pedagogy
- Advocacy
- Innovation
- Community
- Excellence

== Sponsored publications ==
=== Communication: Journalism Education Today ===
JEA publishes the quarterly magazine, Communication: Journalism Education Today (C:JET), which is available to members of the association. C:JET focuses on subjects pertinent to journalism in schools, and provides a variety of resources to teachers and advisers.

The C:JET staff includes Publications Editor Bradley Wilson, Copy Editor Beth Butler, and Advertising Coordinator Lindsay Porter. JEA accepts electronic submissions to C:JET.

=== JEA.org ===
JEA.org was established April 19, 1996.

=== JEADigitalmedia.org ===
This website is a source of information, tips and teaching insights for online, multimedia and broadcast journalism. It is a branch of the Digital Media committee that was formed to address the growing need to support "convergence" of multiple forms of journalism, particularly the move toward online publications.

== Study ==
In 1987, the Journalism Education Association's "Committee on the Role of Journalism in Secondary Education" published "High School Journalism Confronts Critical Deadline," a 138-page journalism research report. The research indicated that recipients of secondary journalism education are more academically successful. The article cites high school grades, college grades, and American College Testing scores as evidence.

== First Amendment advocacy ==
The Journalism Education Association released an official statement regarding the practice of prior review of a school publication on April 16, 2009. The statement says: "Prior review by administrators undermines critical thinking, encourages students to dismiss the role of a free press in society and provides no greater likelihood of increased quality of student media."

== See also ==
- Student Press Law Center
- Association for Education in Journalism and Mass Communication
- National Student Press Week
