= The Cord =

Student newspaper at the Wilfrid Laurier University

- The tie that binds Wilfrid Laurier University
- The Cord's website as of September 26, 2014
- Type: Weekly student newspaper
- Format: Tabloid
- School: Wilfrid Laurier University
- Owner: Wilfrid Laurier University Student Publications
- Editor-in-chief: Bronte Behling
- Founded: September 23, 1926
- City: Waterloo, Ontario
- Country: Canada
- Circulation: 6,000
- Readership: + 10,000
- Website: www.thecord.ca

The Cord is a student newspaper at Wilfrid Laurier University. Founded in 1926, it features stories about current events on campus and the community as well as student life, sports, arts and opinion. The paper's website compiles all the content from the print edition as well as web-exclusive content. The Cord publishes every Wednesday of the fall and winter semester and monthly over the summer.

The Cord is a member of the Canadian University Press. It is one of several publications produced by Wilfrid Laurier University Student Publications.

== Content ==
The Cord currently features the following sections in print: News (Campus and Local), Sports, Arts & Life, Features, Opinion, classifieds, and letters to the editor. The paper's local content has expanded in recent years to cover regional news including elections and other events in the Waterloo community.

The Cord also publishes online videos and multimedia sequences for the student community. Additionally, the website is updated on a frequent basis with news happening between the weekly print issue.

In 2011, The Cord made the decision to remove its World section from print due to a lack of student reader interest. In 2014, The Cord began removing the National section from print, only writing about national stories when relevant. In 2015, In-Depth was merged with Features to get rid of the stigma associated with "light-hearted" feature pieces.

Changes continued as The Cord was forced to compete with other papers. Campus and Local merged to create one strong news section and the online content grew two-fold while the print product decreased to a maximum of 16 pages.

== Awards and recognition ==
The Cord has been applauded by many in the news industry for its commitment to professionalism as well as its clean and modern design. In 2010 and 2011, The Cord received second place honours by the Canadian Community News Association awards for Best Campus Newspaper. The Cord also won the award for Best Campus Photography (Nicholas Lachance).

At the 2011 Canadian University Press national conference, sports editor Justin Fauteux received a John H. MacDonald (Johnny) award for excellence in sports writing for his piece, "The psychology of sport injury." The win marked The Cord's first Johnny win in over five years.

In 2012, The Cord received third place honours by the Canadian Community News Association awards for Best Campus News Story (Justin Smirlies). The Cord also won the award for Best Campus Photography (Nicholas Lachance).

At the 2013 Canadian University Press national conference, The Cord won two awards. Kevin Campbell won the Johnny Award for Best Sports Writing, and Taylor Gayowsky won the Johnny Award for Best Graphic. That year, The Cord also received recognition in three categories by the Canadian Community News Association awards. They received second place honours for Best Campus Newspaper, and third place honours for Best Campus Photography (Nick Lachance) and Best Campus Feature Story (Justin Smirlies).

In 2014, The Cord won the award for Best Campus Photography (Heather Davidson) from the Canadian Community News Association awards.

At the 2015 Canadian University Press national conference, campus news editor Shelby Blackley won the Johnny award for Best Sports Writing.

At the 2016 Canadian University Press national conference, photo editor Will Huang won the Johnny for Student Photojournalist of the Year. He and Lena Yang, the Creative Director of The Cord, also won Flash File 2, a three-hour design competition where they were required to make a compelling cover with a story written in Flash File 1.

In 2016, The Cord won Outstanding Campus Newspaper and Best Website from the Canadian Community News Association awards. Alanna Fairey, former features editor, also came third for Best Campus Feature.

In 2017, senior news editor Kaitlyn Severin won the Johnny Award for Student Journalist of the Year.

In 2019, sports editor Pranav Desai won the JHM Sports Reporting Award at NASH.

== Wilfrid Laurier University Student Publications ==
Wilfrid Laurier University Student Publications (or WLUSP) is a volunteer-based organization that collects fees from undergraduate students and publishes various media. It became a non-profit corporation in 1970; until then, its functions had been fulfilled under the direction of the Wilfrid Laurier University Students' Union. WLUSP is governed by an elected president and board of directors along with a hired long-term executive director. Volunteers for management-level positions are all hired, but only a few positions, such as The Cord Editor-in-Chief, "Radio Laurier" Station Manager, "The Community Edition" Editor-in-Chief and the WLUSP President, are salaried.

The organization publishes The Cord, the university's newspaper. It also produces: "The Community Edition," Waterloo Region's community monthly; Blueprint Magazine, Wilfrid Laurier's student arts magazine; "Keystone" and "Carnegie," Wilfrid Laurier University's yearbooks for the Waterloo and Brantford campuses; The WLU'er, a student planner, The Sputnik, Laurier Brantford's official student newspaper, RadioLaurier.com Laurier's campus radio station and "Laurier Student Poll," Laurier's market research group.

== Important events ==
- 1926 - The Cord Weekly is founded as Laurier's official student newspaper.
- 1991 - The Cord Weekly gains national media attention after the Wilfrid Laurier University Students' Union locks WLUSP's office doors because of an article discussing the details of homosexual sex. As a result, WLUSP successfully campaigns to gain administrative control over its student fees.
- 2009 - The Cord Weekly changes its name to The Cord to better represent its publication.
- 2014- The Cord went through another print design to be more modern and accessible to students
- 2015- The Cord lowered its overall print distribution to put more resources toward thecord.ca

== See also ==
- List of student newspapers in Canada
- List of newspapers in Canada
