= List of student newspapers in Canada =

Student newspapers in Canada

This is a list of post secondary Canadian student newspapers, listed by province.

== Alberta ==
Institution	Paper	Founded
Athabasca University	The Voice Magazine	1992
MacEwan University	The Griff	2011
Mount Royal University	The Reflector	
Northern Alberta Institute of Technology	The Nugget	1964
Southern Alberta Institute of Technology	The Weal	
The King's University	The Chronicle	
University of Alberta	The Gateway	1910
University of Calgary	The Gauntlet	1960
University of Lethbridge	The Meliorist	1966

== British Columbia ==
Institution	Paper	Founded
British Columbia Institute of Technology	LINK Magazine	1965
Camosun College	The Nexus	
Capilano University	The Capilano Courier	
College of New Caledonia	CNC Ion	
Douglas College	The Other Press	1976
Eric Hamber Secondary School	The Griffins' Nest	2012
Kwantlen Polytechnic University	The Kwantlen Chronicle	
Kwantlen Polytechnic University	The Runner	
Langara College	The Voice	
Royal Roads University	Hatley Herald	
Selkirk College	The Sentinel	
Selkirk College	The Confluence	
Simon Fraser University	The Peak	1965
Thompson Rivers University	The Omega	1991
Trinity Western University	Mars' Hill	1995
University of British Columbia	The Phoenix (Okanagan)	
University of British Columbia	The Ubyssey (Vancouver)	1918
University of the Fraser Valley	The Cascade	1993
University of Northern British Columbia	Over the Edge	
University of Victoria	The Martlet	1948
Vancouver Island University	The Navigator	

== Manitoba ==
Institution	Paper	Founded
Brandon University	The Quill	1910
Collège Universitaire de Saint-Boniface	Le Réveil	
Red River College	The Projector	
St. Paul's College	The Paulinian	
University of Manitoba	The Manitoban	1914
University of Winnipeg	The Uniter	

== New Brunswick ==
Institution	Paper	Founded
Mount Allison University	The Argosy	1872
St. Thomas University	The Aquinian	1935
Université de Moncton	Le Front	
University of New Brunswick	The Baron (Saint John)	1993
University of New Brunswick	The Brunswickan (Fredericton)	1867

== Newfoundland and Labrador ==
Institution	Paper	Founded
Memorial University	The Muse	1950

== Nova Scotia ==
Institution	Paper	Founded
Acadia University	The Athenaeum	1874
Cape Breton University	The Caper Times	1979
Dalhousie University	The Dalhousie Gazette	1868
Dalhousie University	Golden Ram (Faculty of Agriculture)	
Dalhousie University	The Sextant (Sexton Campus)	
St. Francis Xavier University	The Xaverian Weekly	
Saint Mary's University	The Journal	
University of King's College	The Watch	

== Ontario ==
Institution	Paper	Founded
Algonquin College	Algonquin Times	
Brock University	The Brock Press	1964
Canadore College	The Quest	
Carleton University	The Charlatan	1949
Carleton University	The Leveller	
Centennial College	The Toronto Observer	
Conestoga College	The Spoke	
Fanshawe College	The Interrobang	
George Brown College	The Dialog	
Humber College	Et Cetera	
Lakehead University	Argus	
Laurentian University	Lambda	
Laurentian University	L'Orignal déchaîné	
Loyalist College	Photojournalism Pioneer	
Fleming College	The Frost Leader	
Fleming College	The Woodland Times	
McMaster University	The Silhouette	
Niagara College	Niagara News	
Queen's University at Kingston	Golden Words (engineering/humour)	1967
Queen's University at Kingston	The Observer (International Affairs Association)	2003
Queen's University at Kingston	The Queen's Journal	1873
Seneca College	The Buzz	
Sheridan College	The Sheridan Sun	
Toronto Metropolitan University	The Continuist	2005
Toronto Metropolitan University	The Eyeopener	1967
Toronto Metropolitan University	On the Record	1948
Trent University	Absynthe Magazine	
Trent University	Arthur	
University of Guelph	The Ontarion	1951
University of Guelph-Humber	The Avro Post	2017
University of Ottawa	Fulcrum	1942
University of Ottawa	The Iron Otis (STEM)	2012
University of Ottawa	La Rotonde	1932
University of Toronto	The Gargoyle (University College)	1954
University of Toronto	The Medium (Mississauga)	1974
University of Toronto	The Mike (St. Michael's College)	1947
University of Toronto	The Strand (Victoria University)	1953
University of Toronto	Trinity Times (Trinity College)	2020
University of Toronto	The Innis Herald (Innis College)	1965
University of Toronto	The Underground (Scarborough)	1982
University of Toronto	The Varsity	1880
University of Waterloo	Imprint	1978
University of Waterloo	The Iron Warrior (Waterloo Engineering Society)	1980
University of Waterloo	mathNEWS (MathSoc)	1973
University of Western Ontario	Gazette	
University of Windsor	The Lance	1959
Wilfrid Laurier University	The Cord	
Wilfrid Laurier University	The Sputnik	
York University	Excalibur	
York University	Pro Tem (Glendon College)	

== Prince Edward Island ==
Institution	Paper
Holland College	The Surveyor
University of Prince Edward Island	The Cadre

== Quebec ==
Institution	Paper
Bishop's University	The Campus
Cégep Régional de Lanaudière à Joliette	Le Détour
Collège Jean-de-Brébeuf	Le Graffiti
Concordia University	The Concordian, The Link, L'Organe
Dawson College	The Plant
École polytechnique de Montréal	Le Polyscope
HEC Montréal	L'Intérêt
John Abbott College	Bandersnatch
Marianopolis College	The Papercut and The Marianopolis World Review
McGill University	Le Délit, The McGill Daily, McGill Tribune, The McGill International Review and The Bull & Bear
Université de Montréal	Quartier Libre, Le Pigeon Dissident
Université de Sherbrooke	Le Collectif
Université du Québec à Chicoutimi	Le Griffonnier
Université du Québec à Montréal	Montréal Campus, Horizons Économiques and La Chemise Magazine
Université Laval	Impact Campus and La Marmite sociale

== Saskatchewan ==
Institution	Paper
University of Regina	The Carillon
University of Saskatchewan	The Sheaf

== See also ==
- List of student newspapers
- Canadian University Press
