= The Carillon (Regina) =

University of Regina student newspaper

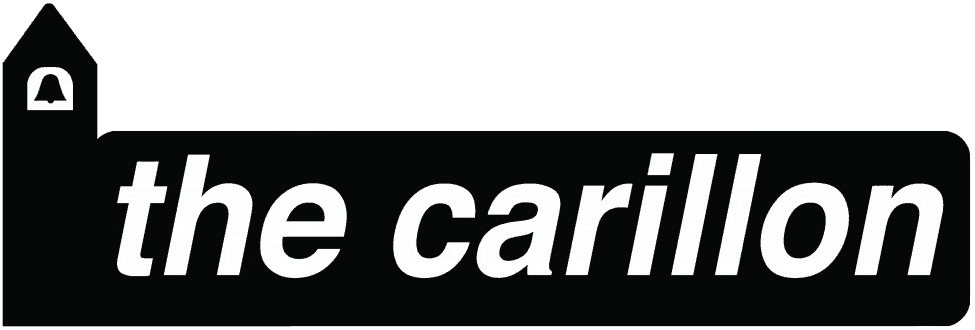
- Type: Student newspaper
- Format: Broadsheet
- Owner: University of Regina
- Founded: 1962
- Headquarters: Regina, Saskatchewan
- OCLC number: 17513456
- Website: www.carillonregina.com

The Carillon is the student published newspaper at the University of Regina in Regina, Saskatchewan, Canada. It began publication in 1962 and has a reputation for producing notable journalists. Like many university newspapers, it has had a colourful, precarious existence. Among its many alumni are Canadian broadcaster Norm Bolen and novelist Ken Mitchell.

== History ==
The Carillon as a student organization has grown and evolved over the years. Before 1962 there existed a variety of campus news outlets in the form of single page letters or smaller broadsheet publications. The names of these papers include The Cricket, The Sparrow and The Forum. The name Carillon (French in origin) was selected in 1962 by a vote of the student body. It moved to change its status from a conventional "top-down" administrative structure in 1975, a shift that was formalized about 15 years later.

During the period of the 1960s The Carillon enjoyed great infamy, labeled as a "red paper" for its strong left wing editorial content. Archives reveal a paper filled with political activism and left wing rhetoric. The Carillon reflected the anti-war sentiment of many American intellectuals who left the U.S. to teach in Canada. The paper also enjoyed seemingly much more lax editorial restrictions, publishing scandalous (at the time) articles and using challenging imagery to provoke students and faculty. One (in)famous cover has the dean of education standing at a lectern before a Nazi procession, with the University coat of arms replacing the swastika symbol.

A book has been written, by Prof. James Pitsula of the University of Regina, exploring the political attitudes and activism of the University's students and faculty during the 1960s through extensive research of the pages of The Carillon. He is in possession of many interesting historical documents including photos, archives and slides. The book is titled New World Dawning: The Sixties At Regina Campus.

The early 70s saw a prominent period for Carillon editors; featuring individuals such as Keith Reynolds, Tim Naumetz, and Brian Kowalchuk. Not only were they writers and editorial leaders, they also participated every year in fielding a drinking team for the annual Bacchus festival; which featured the Carillon Hotel Inspection Tour, or CHIT. Often covered by the national media, CHIT was a drinking competition requiring entrants, singles and doubles, to consume individual glasses of draft beer at downtown Regina hotel bars, running from one to another for a total of 24 beers; all without the regurgitation. Many contestants were primed and trained for CHIT success during the weekly Pub Nights held every Thursday in the venerable Student Union building, at which Sandy Monteith reigned supreme. Monteith dominated CHIT for years.

During the 1990s, The Carillon was maintained by a dedicated group of writers and editors who believed in the newspaper's founding socialist principle of governance by a collective of contributors, and the importance of freedom of the press. Throughout this period, contributors felt undue pressure to be the mouthpiece of the University of Regina Students' Union. The Students' Union's increasingly heavy-handed direction of "The Carillon", coupled with financial mismanagement by previous Carillon editorial staff, caused conflict at weekly meetings, and threats to shut the paper down. In the summer of 1998, "The Carillon" decided to finally get out from under the yoke of URSU (University of Regina Students' Union) and sought autonomy under the Saskatchewan Non-Profit Corporations Act, assisted in these efforts with help from its sister paper, the University of Manitoba's "The Manitoban" (who had recently undergone the same process), both under the umbrella of the Canadian University Press. The effort was successful, allowing the paper to operate independently, without editorial interference from URSU, and under its own financial operations. Notable "Carillon" alumni from the '90s include Tanya Birkbeck, Merelda Fiddler, Bonnie Allen, and Jen Quesnel, all journalists on air with CBC Radio.

Up until 2002 the collective had the power to hire staff members of The Carillon. During the 2002/03 school year a series of events led to a reorganization of the paper at various levels of operation from the board of directors to the line editors. In the wake of a controversial article that was intended to be satirical (some found sexist and offensive) a small, vocal group of student activists protested against the Carillon and attempted to put forward a series of motions at the annual general meeting that directed editorial content and dismiss staff members. The motions were ruled out of order (to the frustration of protestors) but the efforts of the protesters changed the organization significantly. Calls for further accountability of the paper and checks and balances on the authority of the Editor in Chief led to a reorganization of the Carillon board of directors and a redrafting of the constitution to meet the demands of the activists.

By 2003/04, The Carillon staff would no longer be hired by the collective but by the reformed board of directors. Although this wasn't the intention of protesters, Carilloners involved directly in the operation of the paper foresaw the danger of having a collective body make hiring decisions for specialized roles at the paper (editor, production manager, photographers, financial officers, etc.). The new constitution dictated that the collective would only be allowed to elect members to the board of directors. The new board of directors were endowed with a series of fiduciary and hiring powers to act as a check on the editor in chief. Registered students from any faculty or background can run for a seat on the board of directors. As a result, the Carillon hiring process is no longer "a goddamn popularity contest" but a streamlined event that judges candidates based on experience and previous involvement at the paper.

Despite the aforementioned electoral changes, The Carillon again became embroiled in controversy in 2006 when an article was published that was deemed by some to encourage sexual harassment. After being pressured to acknowledge that members of its readership had been offended, The Carillon issued a formal apology and retraction of the article.

== Funding ==
The Carillon derives a portion of its budget from a student levy each semester. The student levee makes up approximately half of The Carillon operating budget which goes towards the actual cost of printing the paper.

The Carillon also derives a significant portion of its budget from local advertisers seeking to capture the university demographic. An aggressive data mining campaign by the Carillon and its advertising partner Campus Plus has created a strong base of knowledge about university student consumer habits. Many businesses are attracted to the newspaper for its loyal readership, low advertising rates, and the fact that university students tend to be well-educated, affluent consumers of luxury goods like cars, clothing and alcohol.

== Operations ==
=== Board of directors ===
While the board has no actual say over editorial content in the newspaper they can still have a strong influence by the people they hire. The board reviews the financial statements, approves spending, mandates duties of staff, enforces the constitution and acts as a communication conduit between URSU and other university bodies. Currently, the board consists of the Executive Director, and five students at large. Each student at large is elected by the collective in the spring of each year. Empty seats are filled by byelection in the fall.

=== Staff ===
The staff consists of the following positions:

- Executive Director
- Editor-in-chief
- News editor
- Community editor
- Ep-ED editor
- Web Tech
- Graphic Designer
- News writer
- Community writer
- EP-ED writer
- Staff writer

== Publication ==
The Carillon is published 24 times a year, twice in the summer and 22 during the regular school year. It comes out every Thursday night and can be found on campus or at one of 40 off-campus locations.

== See also ==
- List of student newspapers in Canada
- List of newspapers in Canada
