= The Peak (newspaper) =

Newspaper in British Columbia, Canada

- Type: Weekly student newspaper
- Format: Tabloid
- School: Simon Fraser University
- Owner: The Peak Publications Society
- Editor-in-chief: Michelle Young and C Icart
- Founded: 1965
- Headquarters: MBC 2901, 8888 University Dr., Burnaby, BC
- Circulation: 10,000
- Website: the-peak.ca
- Free online archives: https://digital.lib.sfu.ca/newspapers/peak

The Peak is the independent student newspaper of Simon Fraser University in Burnaby, British Columbia, Canada. It is split into six major sections: news, opinions, features, arts, sports, and humour.

== History ==
The Peak was founded on October 6, 1965 through the merger of SFU's two original student newspapers, The Tartan and The SF View. The Tartan had published six issues under the editorship of Lorne Mallin, while the SF View had published one, edited by Rick McGrath. Because no name had yet been decided, the first printed issue was unnamed; the October 20, 1965 issue was the first to carry the banner of The Peak.

The Peak achieved full financial and editorial autonomy from the Student Society in a 1995 decision, bringing The Peak in line with the majority of Canadian student newspapers. Student newspapers seek autonomy mostly to avoid conflicts of interest, in which the Student Society, or the university, attempts to exert control over the content of the paper.

== Staff and structures ==
There are 15 editors who comprise The Peak's editorial board: editor-in-chief, copy, production and design, assistant production and design (2), news, assistant news, opinions, features, arts, sports, humour, photo, multimedia, and assistant multimedia. They also have three possible staff writer positions available, as well as a volunteer proofreader position. All editorial roles, with the exception of editor-in-chief and volunteer proofreader are hired on a semesterly basis. Editors may, and very often do, seek multiple terms, sometimes ultimately spanning several years. There is no sports editor position in the summer semester. Until December 2016 there was a paid proofreader position, but it was discontinued as a paid position.

There are several non-editorial roles, hired at an hourly/salary rate, which are not rehired each semester, including social media and promotions coordinator, business manager, web manager, and distribution manager (2). The business manager has historically been the most long-lived position at the paper, and is thus the repository for much of the newspaper's institutional memory. The Peak also maintains a board of directors under the larger Peak Publications Society, which makes certain other decisions, mostly financial in nature. This board is made up partly of editorial staff, partly of "at large" representatives, and of The Peak's business manager.

From 1980 to September 2012, The Peak functioned as an editorial collective, without a managing editor or editor-in-chief position. Each editor maintained general control of their section or process, while broader decisions were made by consensus by the editorial collective as a whole. Peak editors were elected by the paper's voting "collective," which formally consisted of all editors and recent writers, for a period of one "semester" (what SFU calls its trimesters).

As of September 2014, The Peak once again operates under the management of an editor-in-chief, with a hiring process used to employ section editors. The editor-in-chief is still an elected role as of February 2019.

In July 2022, The Peak added the position of fact-checker, to aid the copy editor and section editors in their fact-checking duties.

Like many student newspapers in British Columbia, The Peak is formally run as a registered non-profit society under the BC Societies Act, known as the Peak Publications Society. Technically all SFU students are members of the Peak Society, and refundable membership dues are imposed on all students at SFU as part of the university's student activity fee, which are used to partially fund the paper's operations.

A number of Peak staffers have also held prominent roles in Canadian University Press, the national student newspaper cooperative and wire service, of which The Peak was a long-standing member.

== Printing ==
The Peak publishes weekly during SFU's regular semesters, which totals 13 issues per semester and 39 per year. Currently, The Peak is one of very few student newspapers that continues to run weekly issues during the summer. Like most of Canada's major student newspapers, The Peak is a member of the Canadian University Press.

== In popular culture ==
Edmonton Journal columnist Michael Hingston published a fictionalized account of his time at The Peak, titled The Dilettantes (Freehand Books). It was named one of CBC Books' must-read books of Fall 2013.

== Notable staff ==
Many Peak staffers have gone on to careers as journalists and authors. Notable Peak alumni include journalist and author Allen Garr; Vancouver Province copy editor Lorne Mallin; author and interviewer John Sawatsky, award-winning Calgary Herald journalist Michelle Lang; comedian Mark Little from CBC's Mr. D; Charles Demers, a comedian and author of Vancouver Special; journalist Stephen Hui, author of 105 Hikes In and Around Southwestern British Columbia and other guidebooks; journalist Tara Henley, author of Lean Out: A Meditation on the Madness of Modern Life; and professor Ian Rocksborough-Smith, author of Black Public History in Chicago.

== See also ==
- Simon Fraser University
- Canadian University Press
- Student newspaper
- List of student newspapers in Canada
- List of newspapers in Canada
