= The Ontarion =

Student newspaper of the University of Guelph

- Type: Monthly student newspaper
- Format: Tabloid
- Owner: The Ontarion Inc.
- Editor-in-chief: Carlota Sousa
- Founded: March 29, 1951
- Headquarters: Guelph, Ontario
- Website: theontarion.com

The Ontarion is an independent student newspaper published at the University of Guelph in Guelph, Ontario. It publishes monthly during the fall and winter semesters, with copies distributed on and off campus.

== History ==
The newspaper's first edition was published on March 29, 1951.

The newspaper was intended to serve students at all three founding colleges (Ontario Agricultural College, Macdonald Institute, and Ontario Veterinary College).

One early editor reported that the paper's name came from the idea that the three schools might one day become the University of Ontario.

Over the years the newspaper has changed reflecting the growth on campus and changes in society, as well as the individuality of each new editor and various staff.

The social club atmosphere of the 1950s lead to Ontarion editors in the 1960s to 'stir up controversy' with articles about communism and boarding houses that advertised "whites preferred." One issue in fall 1970 was confiscated by the Royal Canadian Mounted Police at the printing plant because it contained a bulletin with the FLQ manifesto which was illegal under the War Measures Act.

In the 1980s to present day, editors have varied the focus from news and intellectual discussion to letters and opinion pieces in an effort to hear all voices on campus. One of the editors in the 1990s told students: "If you don't like what we're doing with the paper, you can volunteer to help change it...It's your paper."

The newspaper celebrated 50 years of publishing in 2001 and is still one of the few completely autonomous student newspapers in Canada.

Until the summer of 2017, The Ontarion published bi-weekly during the summer semester. It has since ceased summer publication and continues regular publications throughout the traditional school year.

While The Ontarion published weekly in print for most of its history, the newspaper went to a monthly print publication schedule in 2019 so that it could increase its online coverage.

The newspaper published articles online until September 2022. A new article appeared on a temporary site in May 2024. A notice on the homepage read:

The Ontarion is currently rebuilding our website, which we can’t wait to show you when its ready. But major news stories don’t wait for website rebuilds, so this very basic web page will have to do for now. Here we will cover major stories that just can’t wait.

As of February 2026, the most recent article on this temporary site was from October 2024. The notice was replaced in mid-March 2026 with a timer counting down to a website launch on March 27, 2026. A new website went live in mid-April of 2026.

One notable alum of the newspaper is David Akin.

== Structure ==
The Ontarion is a non-profit corporation governed by a Board of Directors, with paid editorial, production, and office staff.

== See also ==
- List of student newspapers in Canada
- List of newspapers in Canada
