= The Concordian (Montreal) =

Newspaper in Montreal, Canada

- "Get the facts."
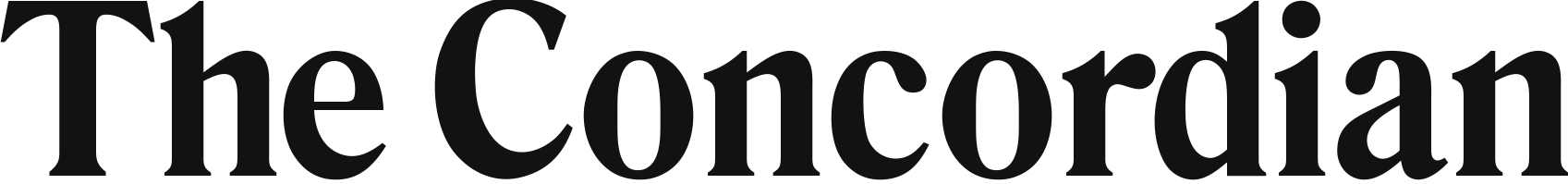
- Type: Student newspaper
- Format: Tabloid (16-20 pages)
- School: Concordia University
- Owner: Le journal étudiant Concordian Inc.
- Publisher: Self-published
- Editor-in-chief: Félix-Antoine Beauchemin
- Associate editor: Tamara Galinato
- Managing editor: Anthony Maruca
- Founded: May 17, 1973 (Formerly "The Paper" from 1968-1973)
- Ceased publication: Nov. 21, 1974
- Relaunched: Jan. 4, 1984
- Language: English, French
- Headquarters: Montreal, Quebec
- Circulation: 2,000 (biweekly)
- Website: theconcordian.com

The Concordian is an independent, entirely student-run newspaper published weekly for the students of Concordia University; its offices and hard-copy distribution centres are located in Montreal, Quebec, Canada.

The Concordian provides the Concordia University community with regular information on university, local and national events, with the goal of reporting fairly and ethically on topics of importance to Concordia's diverse student community.

The Concordian is a member of the Canadian University Press (CUP), and was the host of NASH84 in 2022, Canada's annual university press conference and awards sponsored by CUP. NASH84 featured over 70 prominent journalists from across North America including Brian Stelter of CNN, Jesse Brown of CANADALAND, Anita Li of The Green Line, Jason Chiu of The New York Times, and many others. The theme for NASH84 was "Evolve," and featured many multimedia and independent journalists to discuss the evolving modern landscape of journalism.

== History ==
The history of The Concordian is complex due to its formation being related to the merger of Sir George Williams' University and Loyola College which progressed from 1968 to 1973, when Concordia University was officially founded.

The Concordian was first published in 1973 as a continuation of The Paper, an independent student newspaper which existed on Loyola College's campus from 1968 to 1973. In 1969, The Paper was restructured to hire editors from both SGW and Loyola campuses, becoming the first student newspaper to serve both campuses.

The two other student newspapers, The Georgian and Loyola News, were still being published concurrently. Throughout its five-year existence, The Paper primarily rivalled The Georgian, often accusing The Georgian of publishing false information and unethical coverage. All three papers were in existence when nationwide coverage of the Computer Centre Incident occurred, and it was reported on extensively by each in distinct ethical manners.

The Paper was in conflict with the student association many times throughout the period it was published. In 1971, The Paper reported that the student association and the Dean's Office at Loyola were attempting to ban the paper from circulating without giving written notice. In the same article, it was reported that The Paper had approached the Loyola News and the student association proposing "reciprocal distribution" in order to "enable Sir George students to become acquainted with the west end campus," to which both organizations refused. This was following complaints published by the Loyola News Editor at the time that The Paper was predominating the local advertising market, and that the Loyola News "couldn't stand the competition." Nonetheless, The Paper would continue to circulate for 2 more years.

In late 1973, The Paper reported in its final issue that the student association had decided to cease funding the publication.

The name, Concordia University, was announced several months later in the spring of 1973. In May 1973 The Concordian published its first issue with an announcement stating The Paper had been renamed to reflect the school's merger. During volumes 1 and 2, The Concordian was staffed by many former members of The Paper and was still funded by the same student association. The Concordian published over 40 issues distributed to both Loyola and SGW campuses, but was folded the following year, having not received enough advertising revenue or additional funding from the student association. The Georgian then became the only remaining independent student newspaper on SGW's campus.

Six years later, in 1980, The Link published its first issue, stating that it was the result of a merger between The Georgian and Loyola News.

The Concordian is often credited with being founded three years later in 1983 when several staff members of The Link left to revive The Concordian, formerly known as The Paper. The students successfully formed a competing newspaper which would strictly cover campus-related news and follow editorial policies focused on unbiased, factual reporting. They published the first issue of The Concordian on Jan. 4, 1984, nearly 10 years after it folded. Since that time, The Concordian has been published weekly during the fall and winter semesters.

In 1986, a referendum was passed in which The Concordian became a fee-levy group, and would be funded directly by students rather than receive funds allocated by the student association.

The Concordian later launched a news site, theconcordian.com, eventually switching to only biweekly print editions. In the past 10 years, The Concordian has developed various channels of multimedia content, available in audio and video format.

In the fall of 2022, The Concordian published its 40th volume both online and in print.

== Funding ==
The Concordian is a fee-levy group at Concordia University. The publication is funded directly by students through the fee-levy program set up by Concordia's Student Union. Additional revenue comes from advertisers.

== Notable alumni ==
- Campbell Clark of The Globe and Mail (News Editor in 1992)
- Mike De Souza of The Narwhal, formerly Global News, the National Observer, and the Toronto Star (News Editor in 1997–98)
- Ricky Leong of the Calgary Sun (Editor, mid-1990's)

== Awards ==
=== 2022 ===
- John H. McDonald Awards (CUP), Photojournalist of the Year, Catherine Reynolds, Photo Editor 2021-22
- John H. McDonald Awards (CUP), Best Public Health Coverage, Bogdan Lytvynenko, Co-News Editor 2021-2022

== See also ==
- List of student newspapers in Canada
- List of newspapers in Canada
