= McGill International Review =

McGill University undergraduate daily publication

The McGill International Review
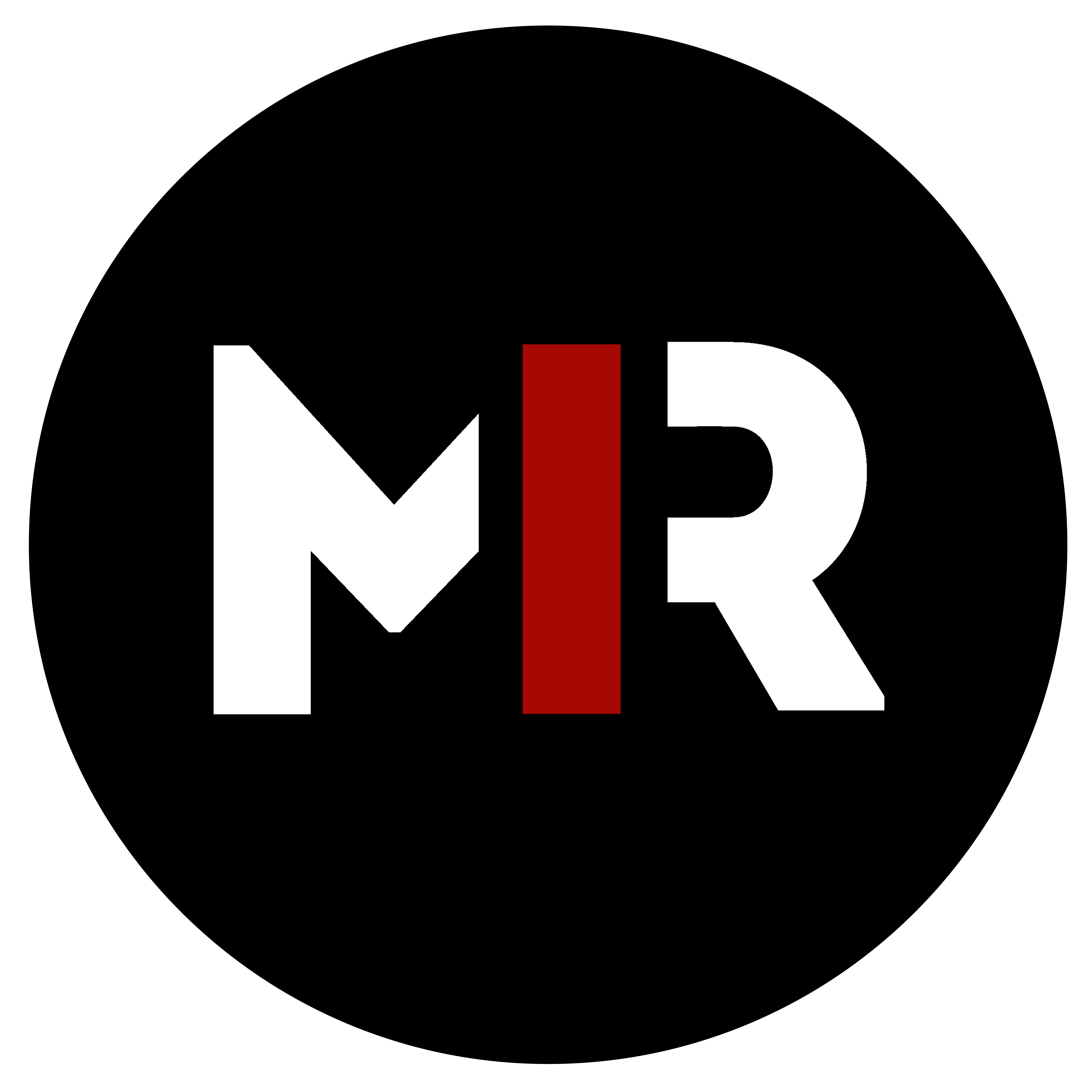
- Editor-in-Chief: Rafay Ahmed
- Managing Editor: Dahlia Harrison-Irwin
- Categories: International affairs, Politics, Student newspaper, Journalism
- Frequency: Daily Publication
- Publisher: International Relations Students' Association of McGill
- Founded: 2000
- Country: Canada
- Language: English, French
- Website: www.mironline.ca

The McGill International Review (MIR) is an international relations publication at McGill University, located in Montreal, Quebec, Canada. It is considered one of Canada's leading undergraduate journals of international affairs. In publication since 2000, MIR operates as a digital publication featuring articles on global political, economic, and social issues. It also produces a podcast series featuring interviews with prominent politicians, diplomats, and journalists.

Since 2024, MIR has featured, among many others, interviews with Bob Rae, Canada's Ambassador to the United Nations; Clarissa Ward, CNN’s Chief International Correspondent; Declan Walsh, Chief Africa Correspondent for The New York Times; Francesca Albanese, the United Nations Special Rapporteur on the occupied Palestinian territories; Gerald Butts, former Principal Secretary to Prime Minister Justin Trudeau; Ujjal Dosanjh, former federal Health Minister and Premier of British Columbia; and Vincent Rigby, former National Security and Intelligence Advisor to the Prime Minister.

MIR has been recognized with four Publication of the Year awards from the Students’ Society of McGill University since 2019. With an annual staff of over 100 students, MIR is one of the largest publications on campus. The current Editor-in-Chief is Rafay Ahmed, and the Managing Editor is Dahlia Harrison-Irwin.

== History ==
=== 2000–2010 ===
MIR was founded in 2000 as a print magazine under the International Relations Students’ Association of McGill (IRSAM). Its inaugural issue, Canada in the World, brought together writing from students, professors, and external contributors, aiming to provide a neutral, student-led platform for dialogue on international affairs. Among the early contributors were prominent Canadian figures such as Louise Arbour, former Supreme Court justice and United Nations High Commissioner for Human Rights, and Desmond Morton, who was leading historian of Canadian political and military history.

Throughout the 2000s, MIR operated primarily as a print publication, publishing themed editions that reflected the global political climate of the time. In 2010, a structural reorganization of IRSAM granted MIR greater editorial independence. This marked a turning point in the publication's identity, as it gradually shifted from academic essays to a more accessible model of research-driven journalism written by and for undergraduates.

=== 2010–present ===
In 2013, MIR launched a digital platform to broaden its reach and facilitate continuous, year-round publication. This initiative was undertaken during the tenure of Ameya Pendse, then Vice President of Internal Affairs for IRSAM. Esther Lee was appointed as the first Editor-in-Chief of the new MIR, while Alex Langer led the development and implementation of the digital platform. The addition of blog-style commentary in 2014 helped diversify its content and brought in new voices from across McGill's student body. Over the following years, the publication experienced rapid growth in both readership and submissions, establishing itself as a leading forum for undergraduate commentary on global affairs.

MIR also expanded into multimedia journalism. Its team launched a podcast and began producing video interviews and short documentaries, reflecting a broader shift toward professionalized media production. In 2017, the publication's growing stature was formally recognized when both the Editor-in-Chief Online and Editor-in-Chief Print were granted independent seats on the IRSAM Board of Directors, a milestone in its institutional development.

The following year, the print edition was rebranded as Flux: International Relations Review, and MIR became an exclusively online publication. A French-language section was also introduced in 2018 to engage a wider readership.

In 2019, MIR was awarded the Students’ Society of McGill University's Publication of the Year award for the first time. It has since received the honour multiple times, most recently in 2024.

== Structure and Organization ==
Since the early 2020s, MIR's editorial structure has largely remained the same. The publication is led by the Editor-in-Chief and the Managing Editor, who together form the senior executive team and oversee all aspects of the publication's operations. Both are selected each year at the end of the academic calendar by members of the outgoing executive team.

MIR operates with a staff of approximately 100 students each year. The executive team includes the Editor-in-Chief, Managing Editor, several Senior Editors, and a group of Directors. Director roles may vary by year, but commonly include a Director of Contributions, responsible for managing non-staff submissions, and a Director of Media, responsible for podcast and multimedia content. The executive team is hired by the Editor-in-Chief and Managing Editor prior to the start of the academic year.

Each Senior Editor oversees a team of 10 to 20 Staff Writers and Editors, who are hired at the start of the Fall and Winter semesters, in September and January respectively. By a long-standing tradition, Senior Editors name their teams after journalists or public intellectuals they admire. At the beginning of each month, pitch meetings are held within each team, where Staff Writers present article ideas. Approved pitches are assigned by Senior Editors to an Editor, who supports the writer throughout the writing and revision process. Articles typically go through several rounds of edits, beginning with the assigned Editor, followed by the Senior Editor, and concluding with final review by the Managing Editor before being published on MIR's website.

=== Editors-in-Chief and Managing Editors ===
Year	Editor-in-Chief	Graduation Year	Managing Editor	Graduation Year
2017–2018	Ben Aloi	BA ’18	position established 2019	NA
2018–2019	Sarie Khalid	BA ’19	NA	NA
2019–2020	Alec Regino	BA ’20	Shirley Wang	BSc ’20
2020–2021	Charles Lepage	BA ’19, MD '23	Christopher Ciafro	BA ’19, BCL/JD '22
2021–2022	Emma Frattasio	BA ’22	Naomi Shi	BA ’22
2022–2023	Emily Jones	BA ’23	Savannah Sguigna	BA ’23
2023–2024	Alison Lee	BA ’24	Teodor Gaspar	BA ’24
2024–2025	Clare Rowbotham	BA ’25	Lillian Molesky	BA ’25
2025–2026	Stellar Zhang	BA ’26	Rafay Ahmed	BA ’27
2026–2027	Rafay Ahmed	BA ’27	Dahlia Harrison-Irwin	BA ’27
