= David Akin =

Canadian reporter

- Occupation: Journalist
- Website: davidakin.com

David Akin is a Canadian reporter, currently the chief political correspondent for Global News.

== Early life and career ==
Akin studied history at the University of Guelph in Guelph, Ontario, Canada, graduating in 1991. During his time in Guelph, Akin served as a student Editor-in-Chief of The Ontarion.

Akin's career began in 1993 with The Packet and Times in Orillia, Ontario, as the paper's city hall reporter. In 1995, he moved to The Chronicle Journal in Thunder Bay, where he worked as a senior reporter and joined The Hamilton Spectator and then the National Post, followed by The Globe and Mail.

From 2001 to 2008, Akin was a parliamentary correspondent for CTV News before joining Canwest News Service (now known as Postmedia) as a national affairs correspondent. At CTV, Akin won a Gemini Award for his reporting. The Globe and Mail reported that he resigned from Canwest on June 10, 2010, to become the first reporter for Sun Media's new all news cable service. From 2011 to 2015, he was the national bureau chief for Sun Media and the Sun News Network and hosted The Daily Brief and later, the hour-long show Battleground. He was briefly a freelance reporter after the demise of the channel before returning to the Sun chain, following its acquisition by Postmedia, as parliamentary bureau chief and sole member of the chain's Parliamentary bureau.

In February 2010, Akin reported that Gordon Lightfoot had died, which turned out to be a hoax. According to The New York Times, someone claiming to be Lightfoot's grandson called "the management company representing Lightfoot’s close friend and fellow musical legend Ronnie Hawkins." The Times continued:

Hawkins then started calling people to let them know, who in turn alerted Canwest News Service, which called Hawkins to confirm the news and then published a brief news item that got picked up by a number of the chain’s newspapers. That report was then spread by reporters on Twitter, including Canwest political reporter David Akin...

On September 13, 2022, Akin heckled newly-elected leader of the Official Opposition, Pierre Poilievre as he attempted to hold his first press conference. Akin stopped interrupting Poilievre once he agreed to take questions from reporters.
