= The Memorial Times =

Student newspaper in Newfoundland and Labrador

- Publisher: Memorial University College
- Language: English

The Memorial Times was a publication of Memorial University College prior to its successor, The Muse.

The Times, the first student newspaper of Memorial University, was started at least as early as November 28, 1936, in a bimonthly format. The periodical continued (with a gap from March 1937-November 30, 1945) until December 19, 1947, by which it had moved to a monthly edition.

== Editors ==
- Michael Harrington, Nov. 28, 1936.
- I. Newell, May 4, 1937.
- Al Taylor, Nov. 30-Dec. 18, 1945.
- Bill Summers, Mar. 20, 1946.
- F. W. Rowe, Aug. 14, 1946.
- Edison J. Lowe and John A. Ryan, Nov. 14-Dec. 19, 1947.
