= The Capilano Courier =

Students newspaper in British Columbia, Canada

The Capilano Courier is the student newspaper at Capilano University, a public university in the District of North Vancouver, British Columbia, Canada. First published in 1968, the Capilano Courier is staffed by students and alumni operating independently of the university's administration and the Capilano Students' Union. It is published weekly by the Capilano Courier Publishing Society. The Capilano Courier is a member of Canadian University Press. The Capilano Courier reports on news, sports, campus life, arts and a variety of national and international topics in their opinions and features. The Capilano Courier also publishes a weekly calendar, editorial, reviews and horoscopes.

Incoming Editors-in-Chief are voted in by the prior year's editorial staff and contributors, who must be members of the Capilano Courier Publishing Society.

== Reformatting ==
In the summer of 2019, the Courier announced that it would be changing to a monthly magazine format.

In the summer of 2021, the Courier revamped their website.

During the 2021-22 publication year, the Courier added an Indigenous News section along with a Communities section to their magazine.

== See also ==
- List of newspapers in Canada
- List of student newspapers in Canada
