= Gauntlet (newspaper) =

Campus newspaper in Calgary, Canada

The Gauntlet
- Rage provides arms
- Type: Bi-weekly student newspaper
- Owner: Gauntlet Publication Society
- Publisher: Gauntlet Publication Society
- Editor-in-chief: Matthew R. Johnson
- Founded: 1960
- Headquarters: Calgary, Alberta
- Website: The Gauntlet

The Gauntlet is a campus publication published by the Gauntlet Publications Society at the University of Calgary. Though commonly referred to as the "University of Calgary's newspaper", it is independent from the University administration and from the Student Union. It has a circulation of 4,000 as well as approximately 50,000 monthly online hits. In 2017, it transitioned from a weekly newspaper to a monthly magazine, but returned to the newspaper format (biweekly) in 2019.

== Notable alumni ==
- Susanne Craig
- Zsuzsi Gartner
- John Edward Macfarlane

== See also ==
- List of student newspapers in Canada
- List of newspapers in Canada
