= The Argus (Thunder Bay) =

Student newspaper in Ontario, Canada

- Type: Student Press
- Format: Tabloid
- Owner: Lakehead University Student Union
- Editor: Fisher Monahan
- Staff writers: 5-6
- Founded: 1966
- Headquarters: Lakehead University; 955 Oliver Road; Thunder Bay, Ontario
- Country: Canada
- Price: Free
- Readership: 6,000-7,000
- Website: theargus.ca

The Argus is a student funded media outlet, produced and distributed for the students of Lakehead University, in Thunder Bay, Ontario, Canada. Issues are available for free throughout the University, and at various locations throughout the city. Every week The Argus strives to cover stories that pertain to students, both on the local and international level.

== History ==
The Argus's first issue was printed on October 3, 1966 and was published by the Alma Mater Society of Lakehead University (which later became the Lakehead University Student Union). Its first Editor-in-Chief was William Inglis and covered both university and international affairs.

== Operation ==
The paper is controlled by an executive committee consisting of five paid staff members: three of which are voted in by a special committee at the end of the academic year (editor-in-chief, business manager, and production manager), as well as two other selected from the rest of the newspaper staff. Eleven paid staff members make up the editorial body of the paper.

Any Lakehead University student may apply for membership to the Argus after having contributed printed works to the paper throughout the year and successfully petitioning the executive committee for admission. Membership entitles a student to an honorarium for each article published, as well as other rights within the newspaper. Articles are accepted for publication from any student, despite his or her membership in the newspaper, so long as they meet the content and quality requirements laid out by the editors.

Advertising sales are coordinated through the business manager on a weekly basis and are published within the newspaper as well as online.

The Argus is a member of the Canadian University Press (CUP), and CUP's national advertising agency, Campus Plus.

== See also ==
- List of student newspapers in Canada
- List of newspapers in Canada
