= The Brunswickan =

Canadian student newspaper

Coordinates: 45°56′42.78″N 66°38′29.43″W

- Canada's Oldest Official Student Publication
- "Sharkie" the Brunswickan's mascot
- Type: Monthly Student Newspaper
- Format: Magazine
- Publisher: Brunswickan Publishing Inc.
- President: Joel Rumson
- Editor: Emmanuel Joseph
- Founded: 1867; 159 years ago
- Headquarters: Student Union Building, Fredericton, New Brunswick
- Circulation: 200 monthly
- Readership: 7000 Monthly
- Sister newspapers: The Barron
- Website: thebruns.ca
- Free online archives: https://sve.canadiana.ca/view/carl.NBFUseries

The Brunswickan is the official student newspaper of the Fredericton campus of the University of New Brunswick, New Brunswick, Canada. Founded in 1867, it has a circulation of 4,000 and issues are published on the first Wednesday each month, traditionally running 8 issues annually.

== Overview ==
A founding member of the Canadian University Press, The Brunswickan remains one of the largest community newspapers in Atlantic Canada, and among the largest in Canada, well out-of-proportion to the size of its home campus. In January 2009, the paper switched from broadsheet to tabloid format in response to financial pressures, and in an effort to reduce its impact on the environment. The Brunswickan subsequently dropped its circulation from 10,000 to 6,000 issues per week later that month, and again to 5,000 in 2012. Circulation dropped again to 4,000 in September 2013. By the 2024-25 publishing term, print runs dropped to 200 copies per issue, underscoring both the shift toward digital content and the continued financial pressures on The Brunswickan.

The Brunswickan was founded in 1867 and is the oldest Canadian student publisher. At the time of its foundation, the University of New Brunswick had still been known as King's College.

Regional rival, The Dalhousie Gazette at Dalhousie University in Halifax, Nova Scotia, claims the title of "oldest student newspaper in Canada." The Gazette has published consecutively since 1868, whereas there are significant gaps in the publishing history of The Brunswickan.

During the Strax affair of 1968-69 two students were charged with contempt of court over an article published in the Brunswickan that questioned the objectivity of the New Brunswick courts. Both were found guilty. The editor, John Oliver, was fined $50 and required to print a retraction. The author, Tom Murphy, was sentenced to ten days in jail.

The Brunswickan Office on University of New Brunswick Fredericton Campus

In the past, members of the paper have been referred to as "brunsies," a term of pride and affection for some.

Among its notable alumni are Colin B. Mackay, Bliss Carman, Charles G. D. Roberts, Dalton Camp, Fredrik Eaton, Nathan White, Donald Pringle and Kwame Dawes.

The Brunswickan has a sister-publication, The Baron, at the other UNB campus, UNB Saint John.

The Brunswickan has a good-natured rivalry with The Aquinian, the campus newspaper for St. Thomas University which is also located on Fredericton's college hill.

== Editors in Chief ==
2025-26	Emmanuel Joseph
2024-25	Joel Rumson
2023-24	Sofia Erickson
2022-23	Taylor Lynn Chalker
2021-22	Michael Harlan
2020-21	Ally Buchanan
2019-20	Brad Ackerson
2018-19	Book Sadprasid*
2017-18	Emma McPhee
2016-17	Adam Travis
2015-16	Emma McPhee
2014-15	Tess Allen
2013-14	Nick Murray
2012-13	Sandy Chase
2011-12	Christopher Cameron
2010-11	Colin McPhail
2009-10	Sarah Ratchford
2008-09	Josh O’Kane
2007-08	Jennifer McKenzie
2006-07	Tony von Richter (interim) / Michele Legendre / Tony von Richter (interim) / David Arthurs
2005-06	Brendan Doyle
2004-05	Patrick Reinartz
2003-04	Sean Patrick Sullivan
2002-03	Sean Patrick Sullivan
2001-02	Cindy Brown
2000-01	Cindy Brown
1999-00	Joseph Wilfred John FitzPatrick III
1998-99	Joseph Wilfred John FitzPatrick III
1997-98	Joseph Wilfred John FitzPatrick III
1996-97	Mary Rogal-Black / Joseph W. J. FitzPatrick III
1995-96	Mark Morgan
1994-95	Al Johnstone
1993-94	Karen Burgess
1992-93	Allan Carter
1991-92	Kwame Dawes
1990-91	Kwame Dawes
1989-90	Kwame Dawes
1988-89	Stéphane Comeau
1987-88	Mark Stevens / Ernest Dunphy
1986-87	Ken Quigley
1985-86	Richard Hutchins
1984-85	Dave Mazerolle
1983-84	Mike MacKinnon
1982-83	Christie Walker
1981-82	Susan Reed
1980-81	Bob MacMillan
1979-80	Joey Kilfoil
1978-79	Kathy Wakeling
1977-78	Sheenagh Murphy
1976-77	Sarah Ingersoll
1975-76	Ed Werthman (one-half term) / Tom Benjamin
1974-75	Susan Manzer
1973-74	Edison Stewart (resigned)
1972-73	Chris J. Allen
1971-72	Edison Stewart
1970-71	Peter Collum
1969-70	Dave Jonah
1968-69	Ian Ferguson
1967-68	Allan B. Pressman
1966-67	Sharon Wyman
1965-66	Gary Davis
1964-65	Roger Mills
1963-64	Russell Irvine
1962-63	Edward Bell
1961-62	Jack Oliver
1960-61	Gordan Howse
1959-60	Dave Folster
1958-59	James O’Sullivan
1957-58	J. Barry Toole
1956-57	J. Barry Toole
1955-56	Fred Drummie
1954-55	Dave MacDonald
1953-54	Neil Marsh Oakley
1952-53	Betty Lou Vincent
1951-52	Neil Oakley
1950-51	Eric Godwin
1949-50	Ralph Hay
1948-49	Murray Jones
1947-48	Vernon Mullin
1946-47	Dalton Camp
1945-46	Henry B. Durost
1944-45	John H. Lawrence
1943-44	Ralph F. Crowther
1942-43	Fred W. Davidson
1941-42	Colin B. MacKay
1940-41	Manzer Bunker
1939-40	Mary T. McMenamon
1938-39	Lester G. Hoar
1937-38	J. Harrison Thurrot
1936-37	Lester G. Hoar
1935-36	Horace Block
1934-35	Bill Morrissy
1933-34	Gerald Waring
1932-33	Fred W. Fenety
1931-32	J. Dudley Kingsley
1930-31	Jack Limerick
1929-30	A. W. Slipp
1928-29	D. H. Smith
1927-28	Burton Kierstead
1926-27	R. R. Henderson
1925-26	Thomas Foulkes
1924-25	Randolph B. Lutz
1923-24	John D. Harrison
1922-23	C. M. Burpee
1921-22	A. C. Holman
1920-21	K. B. Seely
1919-20	N. D. Cass
1918-19	Joseph Sears
1917-18	J. G. Bruce
1916-17	A. D. Foster
1915-16	C. R. Townsend
1914-15	J. A. Hanebry
1913-14	G. T. Christie
1912-13	G. T. Mitton
1911-12	J. F. McIntosh
1910-11	G. F. G. Bridges
1909-10	M. B. Dunn
1908-09	D. G. Willet
1907-08	W. A. Haines
1906-07	C. H. Turner
1905-06	J. P. Mooney
1904-05	F. C. Cronkite
1903-04	M. MacC. Baird
1902-03	Don Jamer / Fred W. Fenety / J. Dudley Kingsley / Jack Limerick
1901-02	A. W. Slipp / D. H. Smith
1900-01	Burton Kierstead / R. R. Henderson
1899-1900	Thomas Foulkes / Randolph B. Lutz
1898-99	John D. Harrison / C. M. Burpee
1897-98	A. C. Holman / K. B. Seely
1896-97	N. D. Cass / Joseph Sears
1895-96	J. G. Bruce / A. D. Foster
1894-95	C. R. Townsend
1893-94	J. A. Hanebry
1892-93	G. T. Christie
1891-92	G. T. Mitton
1890-91	J. F. McIntosh
1889-90	G. F. G. Bridges
1888-89	M. B. Dunn
1887-88	D. G. Willet
1886-87	W. A. Haines
1885-86	C. H. Turner
1884-85	J. P. Mooney
1883-84	F. C. Cronkite
1882-83	M. MacC. Baird
April 1882	Lester G. Hoar
1867	Sir George Foster

In 2018, two senior staff (Brad Ackerson and Maria Araujo) oversaw the publication but no official replacement was hired for the duration of the year.

== Sections ==
- News: Campus and off-campus coverage of student issues and noteworthy happenings, as well as breaking stories.
- Opinion: Editorials, regular columns, and letters to the editor, usually focusing on student and social issues, as well as activism.
- Arts & Culture: Covers community, social issues, culture, arts, and events.
- Sports: Covers University sports in collaboration with Atlantic University Sports (AUS).
- Occasional features are also published that vary in relevant subject matter and tie into different sections.

== See also ==
- List of student newspapers in Canada
- List of newspapers in Canada
