= The Chevron =

- Format: Compact
- Political alignment: Student
- Website: UWChevron.com

The Chevron was the official newspaper published by the Federation of Students at the University of Waterloo (in the city of Waterloo in Ontario, Canada) for approximately two decades. Originally the official newspaper of the Federation of Students was The Coryphaeus. The paper was renamed The Chevron in 1966. The paper was distributed on campus free of charge.

== Loses status as the students' official paper ==
By 1976 friction had developed between the Federation of Students and the staff of The Chevron. In 1976 the Federation locked the paper's staff out of its offices. In response, staff members who had asked to be admitted to retrieve personal possessions refused to leave, and occupied the offices for several months.

On August 22, 1977, Frank Epp, the President of Conrad Grebel College chaired the first meeting of an investigation committee into the difficulties between the Federation and the paper.

By 1978 the Federation took a different approach to the ongoing feud, presenting the student body with a series of referendums: first a referendum to establish a separate, refundable fee to finance the Federation's official paper; and second, a referendum which allowed students to pick either The Chevron, or a new newspaper, The Imprint, as the official paper.

A rump group of dedicated former staffers from The Chevron continued to publish and distribute a smaller, unofficial paper on campus for several years, called The Free Chevron.

== 2010 revival ==
On the 21 May 2010, a group of students anonymously distributed a single page publication branded as The Chevron across various campus buildings. Much of the content of this publication expressed a growing dissatisfaction with the lack of quality and journalistic integrity shown by The Imprint as well as that publication's inadequate coverage, analysis and criticism of the Federation of Students. The last issue of this revived Chevron was during February 2011.

== 2013 revival ==
Another publication, again called The Chevron, appeared on campus in September 2013. Its editors consider it a continuation of both previous Chevron newspapers. However, unlike the critical nature of the 2010 Chevron, this revival often praises the Federation of Students and its regular writers do not operate under pseudonyms. The last issue was published in 2014, and the newspaper seems to be inactive since then.
