= Excalibur (newspaper) =

Canadian community newspaper of York University

- Type: Weekly newspaper
- Format: Tabloid
- Owner: Excalibur Publications Inc.
- Editor: Mahdis Habibinia
- Founded: 1964; 62 years ago
- Language: English
- Headquarters: 420 Student Centre, York University, 4700 Keele Street, Toronto, ON, M3J 1P3, Canada
- Circulation: 16,000
- Website: excal.on.ca

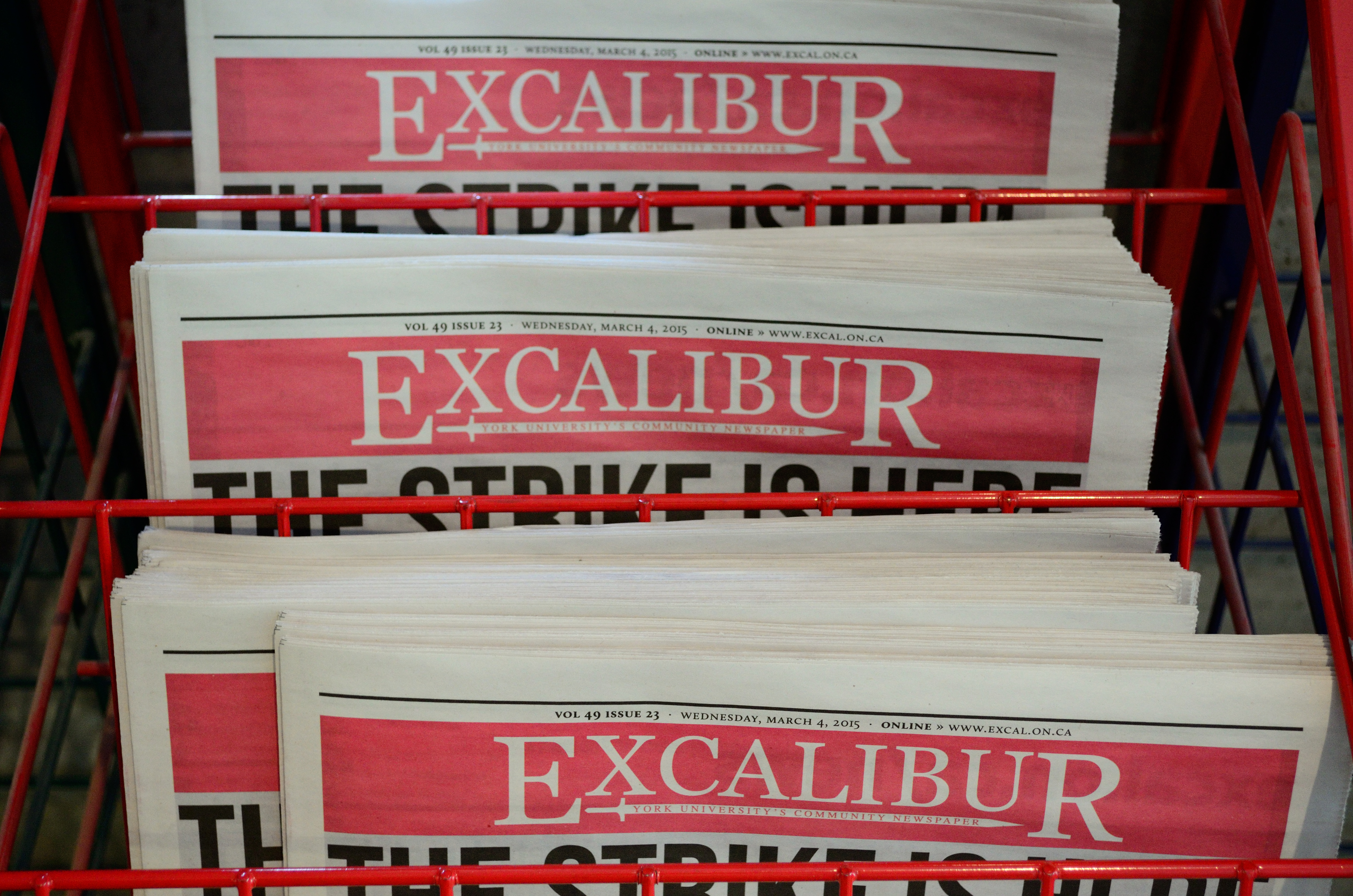
Copies of Excalibur on a newsrack

Excalibur Publications, doing business as Excalibur and sometimes referred to as Excal is the community newspaper of York University, in Toronto, Canada.

Having served the York University community since 1964, it is an autonomous newspaper that publishes campus-related affairs within York University and its community. Its main focus is to serve the student population at York. Distributed on newsracks across the university, the newspaper sources its content from student volunteers. Additionally, the paper comprises a sports editor, a health editor, and an arts editor.

The tabloid paper prints September through April of the academic school year at York University, and takes breaks through the summer. Excalibur features both online and printed versions of their weekly-issued news releases.

== Recognitions ==
Excalibur was awarded in 2010 with Newspaper Pacemaker Award by the Associated Collegiate Press.

In 2010, Excalibur was also awarded by the Associated Collegiate Press with the Best of Show Award at a rank of fifth place.

== See also ==
- List of student newspapers in Canada
- List of newspapers in Canada
