= The Athenaeum (Acadia University) =

Student newspaper in Nova Scotia, Canada

The Athenaeum is the official student newspaper at Acadia University in Wolfville, Nova Scotia. It was founded in 1874, initially as a student literary magazine. The Athenaeum continued in its original format until the 1940s, at which point it became a more traditional newspaper.

The Acadia University Athenaeum Society, preceding the paper, was established in 1860 by a group of students. By 1895, the Society had added debating to their objective, and was thereafter alternatively known as the Athenaeum Debating Society. The 1935 Calendar states that the Athenaeum Society sponsored all inter-class, intercollegiate and other debates.

In 1874 the Athenaeum Society issued the first issue of the student publication, the Acadia Athenaeum.

The Athenaeum was predeceased by the Lyceum Society which was established in 1858 and dissolved in 1860.

It has a circulation of 600 per issue to the Acadia campus and the community of Wolfville. It is available free of charge and is distributed to local businesses and many on-campus buildings.

== Notable alumni ==
- Brooke Earle Sheldon
- J.L. Ilsley
- Charles Aubrey Eaton

== Funding Struggles ==
Since 2016 The Athenaeum has struggled under budget cuts and a lack of support from Acadia's Student Union (ASU). In 2018–19, Editor-in-Chief Colin Mitchell began the groundwork needed to make The Athenaeum an independent paper that does not rely on funding from the ASU. Although, independence was not pursued in the years following Mitchell's term.

In 2021, the ASU's current executive team proposed defunding The Athenaeum to help with their current deficit. This proposal was met with backlash from staff, alumni, students and faculty. Many concerns were brought forth by passionate supporters of The Athenaeum to the ASU. However, comments made towards The Athenaeum's performance resulted in a further uproar from the community.

Following the comments, alumni and students banded together underneath 2020-21 Editor-in-Chief Rylie Moscato to make a Guerilla print issue of The Athenaeum. The issue included articles of support for The Athenaeum and critiques towards the ASU.

As a result of the issue, Moscato was involved in meetings with VP Student Life Robbie Holmes to strategize a path forward for The Athenaeum. Eventually, both parties agreed upon a referendum question detailing a levy collected from students to fund the paper which will be voted on by the student body in 2022.

== The Athenaeum Scholarship ==
In 2020, Colin Mitchell created The Athenaeum Journalism Award for one student journalist to be awarded yearly. Inspired by the misinformation circulated surrounding the COVID-19 pandemic, generations of The Athenaeum alumni are coming together to establish The Athenaeum Journalism Award to support aspiring journalists on Acadia's campus. This will provide those with an interest in this vital field with the funding they need to continue their studies.

The Athenaeum has been absolutely necessary in holding Acadia University to account and asking questions that deserve answers.

But today, the very bedrock of journalism is under threat. The COVID-19 pandemic has demonstrated the power of misinformation and the need for a truly independent press. A strong fourth estate is needed now more than ever.

This award will allow for reporting that is steadfast, unbiased, and accurate to continue at Acadia University.

By November 2024 – the 150th anniversary of the first edition of The Athenaeum – the goal is to have raised $25,000 necessary for an endowment in perpetuity. This will ensure that there will always be a free press at Acadia University.

== See also ==
- List of student newspapers in Canada
- List of newspapers in Canada
