= Lambda (newspaper) =

Student newspaper in Ontario, Canada

Coordinates: 46°27′57.75″N 80°58′13.77″W

- Type: Student newspaper
- Format: Tabloid
- School: Laurentian University
- Founded: 1961
- Language: English
- Headquarters: Sudbury, Ontario, Canada
- Website: thelambda.ca

Lambda is the official English student newspaper at Laurentian University in Sudbury, Ontario, Canada. It is directly funded from the student fees paid to the Student General Association (SGA), Laurentian University's full-time student union, although the newspaper's charter explicitly prevents the SGA from exerting editorial control of any kind over it.

Lambda is distributed bi-weekly on Tuesdays and is available around the Laurentian University campus, as well as partner distributors throughout the city.

The Lambda offices resides on the third floor of the Parker building.

== History ==
Lambda began publication in 1961 at Laurentian University. The newspaper then consisted of 6 staff members, which included the editor-in-chief, financial director, assistant editor, arts and entertainment editor, sports editor, and science and technology editor.

For the 2010/11 school year, Lambda's masthead and layout were completely redesigned with a fresh, slightly grungy aesthetic.

In 2019, the provincial government announced it would allow college and university students to opt-out of paying fees that fund campus groups, student newspapers and clubs. Lambda's only source of funding was the $10 per student it received from a student fee. Following the change, most students at Laurentian University opted out paying the student fee, causing the paper to consider going online-only or finding other sources of financing.

== Operations and distribution ==
Although Lambda maintains an editorial staff on payroll, it continues to accept unsolicited submissions from students and faculty at Laurentian University, and members of the Greater Sudbury community. Lambda also maintains a policy of publishing all letters to the editor not deemed inappropriate or offensive.

== See also ==
- List of student newspapers in Canada
- List of newspapers in Canada
