= The Ubyssey =

University of British Columbia's student-run paper

- Type: Bi-Weekly student newspaper
- Format: Tabloid
- Owner: The Ubyssey Publications Society
- Editor-in-chief: Elena Massing
- Managing editor: Spencer Izen
- Founded: October 17, 1918; 108 years ago
- Language: English
- Headquarters: 6133 Student Union Blvd, Room 2208; Vancouver, British Columbia, Canada
- Circulation: 2–5,000 (per issue)
- Website: ubyssey.ca

The Ubyssey is the University of British Columbia's official, independent student-run paper and is published bi-weekly on Tuesday. Founded on October 18, 1918, The Ubyssey is an independent publication funded by a $7.09 annual fee, from which certain students can opt out. The staff functions as a collective; current UBC students who have contributed to the paper and attend staff meetings are eligible to become staff members. The staff elects the full- and part-time editors on an annual basis. The Ubyssey Publications Society board and president, who deal chiefly with management of the business affairs and strategies of the paper and do not play any editorial role, are elected by the general student body annually at the AMS elections.

== Publication ==
The Ubyssey is primarily web-based, but regular issues of the print edition appear once every two weeks from September to April (except during exams or the Christmas break). Publishing during the summer term varies, but typically occurs once a month. In 2016 one print issue was produced per month, as well as two in August, but summer editions were not published in some years. The Ubyssey also maintains a web site with web-only news and video content.

The paper runs several recurring special issues, including a guide for incoming students to on-campus life, an annual magazine, a sex issue, and one satire issue.

The frequency of publication has varied historically. The paper was published four times a week in 1947, but this only lasted one year. Until the 1980s, there were three issues per week, with Monday and Thursday issues being a standard, university news-oriented edition while The Ubyssey Magazine or "Page Friday" was published on Fridays.

== History ==
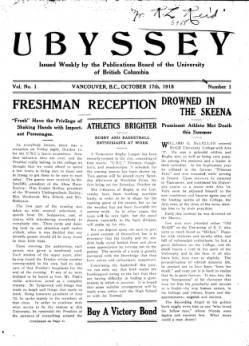
The Ubyssey, October 17, 1918

The first issue of The Ubyssey was printed on October 17, 1918. Over the years the paper took stances supporting the demands for the building of UBC campus at Point Grey and the right of Japanese-Canadians to continue their studies after the bombing of Pearl Harbor. It also spoke out against fraternity hazing, which was banned on campus in 1924, and racist policies at some fraternities were exposed in the paper by Allan Fotheringham in the 1950s.

In 1955 The Ubyssey was ranked the student publication with the most freedom and least faculty control in Canada. Rev. E. C. Pappert was then the faculty advisor with direct editorial control over the student newspaper at Assumption College in Windsor, which had been ranked bottom in that survey. Pappert's response was that "The Ubyssey is the vilest rag you can imagine and is the best argument for censorship that could be produced." The Ubyssey embraced Pappert's remarks and adopted "the vilest rag west of Blanca" as its unofficial slogan.

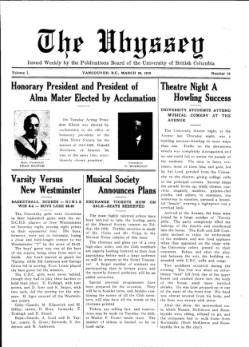
The Ubyssey, March 20, 1919

Irreverence and controversy have indeed been part of The Ubyssey's history. In 1959 the entire staff was fired by the Alma Mater Society (AMS) when a photo was published during the Easter period showing a UBC student crucified on a totem pole. The last issue of the fall term satirizes campus issues and news stories. The spoof issue, published closest to April 1 spoofs another publication. Recent examples included The Grope and Flail, The Georgian Taint, Sports Inundated, Breitbarf, NICE Magazine, and a nude calendar spoofing a fundraising effort by the UBC men's rugby team. In 1974, a report, quoting the Pope, that Patty Hearst had given a speech to students in the Totem Park cafeteria prompted the arrival on campus of a KOMO-TV news team from Seattle which had taken it seriously.

=== Shutdown by the AMS ===
Although The Ubyssey was at arm's length from the Alma Mater Society (AMS), it was still part of and published by the student union while one of its main roles was to report on the AMS's activities. At the same time, the AMS was forced to spend money to fight lawsuits on behalf of a media outlet from which it was continually fending off criticism. This tension emerged in the early 1990s when disputes over editorial control led to the suspension of publication in the summer of 1993, when the AMS created a new "Publications Board" with power over the previously autonomous Ubyssey staff collective. The paper's staff eventually decided to work with the new board and resumed publication for the 1993–1994 school year, but its relationship with the AMS executive only deteriorated during this time with the paper vociferously criticizing the student union on a regular basis and attracting accusations of leftist bias.

The controversies came to a head when the annual spoof issue was published on March 30, 1994. The Ufeces was a self-parody pushing the newspaper staff's own positions to extremes and satirizing their own conflicts with the union. It featured a satirical full-page ad suggesting that the AMS was self-serving, played favourites with clubs and did not care about students, and contained photographs of a female AMS executive in suggestive poses. This proved the final straw, and the AMS council passed a motion to give itself the sole power to choose the paper's editor-in-chief, who would then select all other editors. The AMS's hired editors, however, were unable to produce a paper as staff refused to cooperate. The AMS then changed the locks to the offices, shutting down The Ubyssey.

The fired editors, along with some UBC students, mobilized in response, campaigning to revive the paper. They formed the nonprofit Ubyssey Publications Society and placed a referendum question on the AMS elections ballot on reviving the paper as an independent entity, funded by a $5 fee from which students could opt out. Although there was concern about having enough votes cast to reach the quorum requirement, the referendum to revive The Ubyssey passed on January 24, 1995, with 67 per cent in favour. The first issue of the newly independent Ubyssey was published on July 13, 1995. The Ubyssey also agreed to relocate its offices from the top floor to the basement of the Student Union Building once space became available, a move which was completed in 2001.

=== APEC to the 21st century ===
The Ubyssey played an important role in coverage of the protests which accompanied the holding of the 1997 APEC summit on UBC campus. Photo editor Richard Lam's photograph of RCMP officer Hugh Stewart pepper spraying protesters became iconic with Stewart becoming known as "Sergeant Pepper" and later being summoned to testify at a public inquiry into the police handling of the protests.

Another major issue tackled by the paper in the 1990s was the ten-year exclusivity deal reached in 1995 between Coca-Cola, UBC, and the AMS allowing only Coca-Cola soft drinks to be sold on campus. The Ubyssey fought to force details of the confidential deal to be made public through a freedom of information request which was denied on the basis that it would harm the university's financial interests. The Ubyssey filed a lawsuit and the case eventually reached the Supreme Court of British Columbia which overturned the initial decision, with the deal finally being made public in May 2001. In 2011, the student fee funding The Ubyssey was increased by referendum to $6 per student with an annual increase tied to inflation. The paper's reporting on a chant condoning non-consensual sex during Commerce Undergraduate Society (CUS) orientation activities in September 2013 led to the resignation of CUS executives, an investigation by UBC, and helped publicize similar incidents at other universities.

With the completion of the AMS Nest in 2015, The Ubyssey offices moved into the new student union building. This agreement allows the Ubyssey to maintain an office in the AMS Nest in return for the AMS being allowed to run print ads throughout the school year.

== Notable writers ==
The Ubyssey is the most read student-run paper in Canada. Notable writers throughout its history include Pierre Berton, John Turner, Allan Fotheringham, Michael Valpy, Joe Schlesinger, Stephen Scobie, Bruce Arthur, Justin McElroy and Earle Birney. Other notable alumni include cartoonist Katherine Collins, and photographer Jeff Wall.

== See also ==
- List of student newspapers in Canada
- List of newspapers in Canada
