= The Dalhousie Gazette =

Student newspaper in Nova Scotia, Canada

- Type: Bi-weekly student newspaper
- Format: Tabloid
- Publisher: The Dalhousie Gazette Publishing Society
- Editor-in-chief: Jonas May
- Managing Editor: Hannah Hartley
- Founded: 1868
- Language: English
- Headquarters: 6136 University Ave., Halifax, Nova Scotia B3H 4J2
- Circulation: 1,200
- ISSN: 0011-5819
- OCLC number: 1080355152
- Website: dalgazette.com

The Dalhousie Gazette (more commonly referred to as the Gazette) is the main student publication at Dalhousie University in Halifax, Nova Scotia, Canada. The paper first began publishing in 1868, making it the oldest continually operating student newspaper in North America followed by The Harvard Crimson (1873) and The Columbia Daily Spectator (1877). (The Brunswickan, printed out of the University of New Brunswick, actually predates The Gazette by a year, but began printing in magazine format). The founding editors were J.J. Cameron (who went on to found the Queen's Journal), A.P.Seeton, and W.E. Roscoe.

The Gazette's weekly circulation is 2,000, making it Halifax's third-largest free print publication. The Gazette is run, financed and published by the Dalhousie Gazette Publishing Society, a group of students made up from the Gazette's editors and contributors. The society operates independently of the Dalhousie Student Union, though the paper does charge an annual student levy through the DSU (approx $5.00 per student each academic year) as a means of complementing its advertising income.

The Gazette's primary mandate is to scrutinize and report on the financial, social and administrative powers of the Dalhousie Student Union, its student societies, and the Dalhousie University administration. Within this mandate, the Gazette also covers events and news related to the Dalhousie community, student body and alumni.

As one of Halifax's major independent publications, the Gazette's Dalhousie-centric mandate has often been expanded to include issues outside of the university community proper. Recent publication years of the Gazette gave seen a large emphasis on international events, local artists and regional politics. Reflecting this independent disposition, the Gazette's layout has dispensed with front-page story copy, printing instead a full-cover graphic (usually a photograph) and large teasers with page numbers under the fold.

Along with their Dalhousie counterparts, University of King's College students have made significant contributions to the paper despite being outside of the Gazette's levy umbrella. Aside from providing the paper with many staff reporters and photographers, King's students and alumni have recently filled some of the Gazette's top editorial positions. The editors-in-chief for much of the last decade were King's alumni, and significant portions of the newspaper's editorial staff over the years have come from King's.

A typical issue of the Gazette in 2013/2014 was 24 11x10 pages, with approximately 800 words appearing per page. As of 2022, the Gazette has 10 paid positions: editor-in-chief, managing editor, news editor, opinions editor, arts & culture editor, sports editor, copyeditor, outreach and engagement officer, director of finance and operations, and director of marketing and growth.

== Notable alumni ==
- Ernest Buckler, OC, novelist
- Rt.Hon. Joe Clark, 16th Prime Minister of Canada
- George Elliott Clarke, Canada's parliamentary poet laureate
- Jan Crull, Jr., attorney, investment banker, filmmaker and Native American rights advocate
- Darrell Dexter, Premier of Nova Scotia (2009–2013)
- Duncan Cameron Fraser, 8th Lieutenant Governor of Nova Scotia
- Joseph Howe, journalist, politician and Canadian statesman who contributed a few articles to the Dalhousie Gazette during the Hants County byelection of 1869 (he was already sixty-five years of age). It was also in 1869 that Howe joined the Canadian Cabinet only to resign his position in 1873 to become Lieutenant Governor of Nova Scotia (he died the same year)
- Kenneth Leslie, Canadian poet
- Robert McNeil, television reporter, e.g. "McNeil-Lehrer Report" (American PBS)
- Hugh MacLennan, CC, author, five-time Governor General's award winner
- Lucy Maude Montgomery, CBE. author of Anne of Green Gables
- James Macdonald Oxley, author, lawyer

== See also ==
- List of student newspapers in Canada
- List of newspapers in Canada
