= Newswire =

Distribution service for news and press releases

A newswire is a service used to distribute news reports, press releases, and other information to media organizations and subscribers. The term is associated with the distribution networks of news agencies, including the Associated Press and Reuters. It is also used in public relations to describe services that distribute announcements submitted by businesses and other organizations.

== History ==
The term wire service originated during the nineteenth century, when the electrical telegraph became an important means of transmitting news between cities. Telegraph networks enabled news agencies to deliver reports to newspapers without transporting physical copies.

Early news agencies included Agence Havas, established in 1835, the Associated Press, established in the nineteenth century, and Reuters, founded in 1851. These organizations developed networks for supplying news to subscribing publications.

News transmission later moved to teleprinter systems, satellite communications, and computer networks. The terminology remained in use as electronic distribution replaced earlier transmission methods.

== News agency services ==
News agencies gather and produce reports for distribution to media organizations. Their journalists and editors prepare material that subscribing newspapers, broadcasters, and digital publications may use in their coverage.

International agencies operating news distribution services include Reuters, the Associated Press, and Agence France-Presse. Their reporting allows subscribing outlets to obtain coverage from locations where they may not maintain their own correspondents.

Agency reports may be published by subscribers, edited for local audiences, or used as source material for additional reporting.

== Press release distribution services ==
In public relations, newswires distribute announcements supplied by companies, nonprofit organizations, public institutions, and other entities. These announcements are generally prepared by the issuing organizations and distributed to journalists, media outlets, or online publishing platforms.

Press releases distributed through commercial services commonly concern corporate developments, product announcements, financial results, personnel appointments, and other organizational activities.

Commercial press release distribution services include PR Newswire, Business Wire, GlobeNewswire, and EZ Newswire.

Distribution may involve delivery to editorial contacts, placement on press release websites, and syndication through participating online publications. The channels and recipients vary among providers.

== Editorial practices ==
News agency wire services distribute material produced through their editorial operations. Journalists gather information, prepare reports, and work under the editorial procedures of their organizations.

Commercial press release distribution services generally handle material submitted by their customers. Providers may review submissions before distribution, although the content remains attributable to the issuing organization.

Publication of a press release through a distribution network does not necessarily constitute independent reporting by the receiving publication. Journalists may subsequently investigate or report on the announcement as part of their own coverage.

== Distribution and syndication ==
Electronic distribution allows material to reach multiple recipients through a single service. News agency subscribers receive editorial content through arrangements with the agency, while commercial press release distribution services deliver announcements according to the distribution options selected by their customers.

Some press release services also arrange for announcements to appear on participating websites. Such republication is a form of content syndication and may occur without the receiving outlet producing a separate news report.

== Terminology ==
Newswire and wire service have long been associated with news agencies. In journalism, both expressions are commonly used when referring to agency reporting and its distribution.

In public relations, newswire is also used for commercial press release distribution. The term therefore appears in descriptions of services with different editorial practices and methods of obtaining content.

== See also ==
- News agency
- Press release
- Public relations
- Media relations
- Content syndication
