= Student publication =

Media outlet run by students

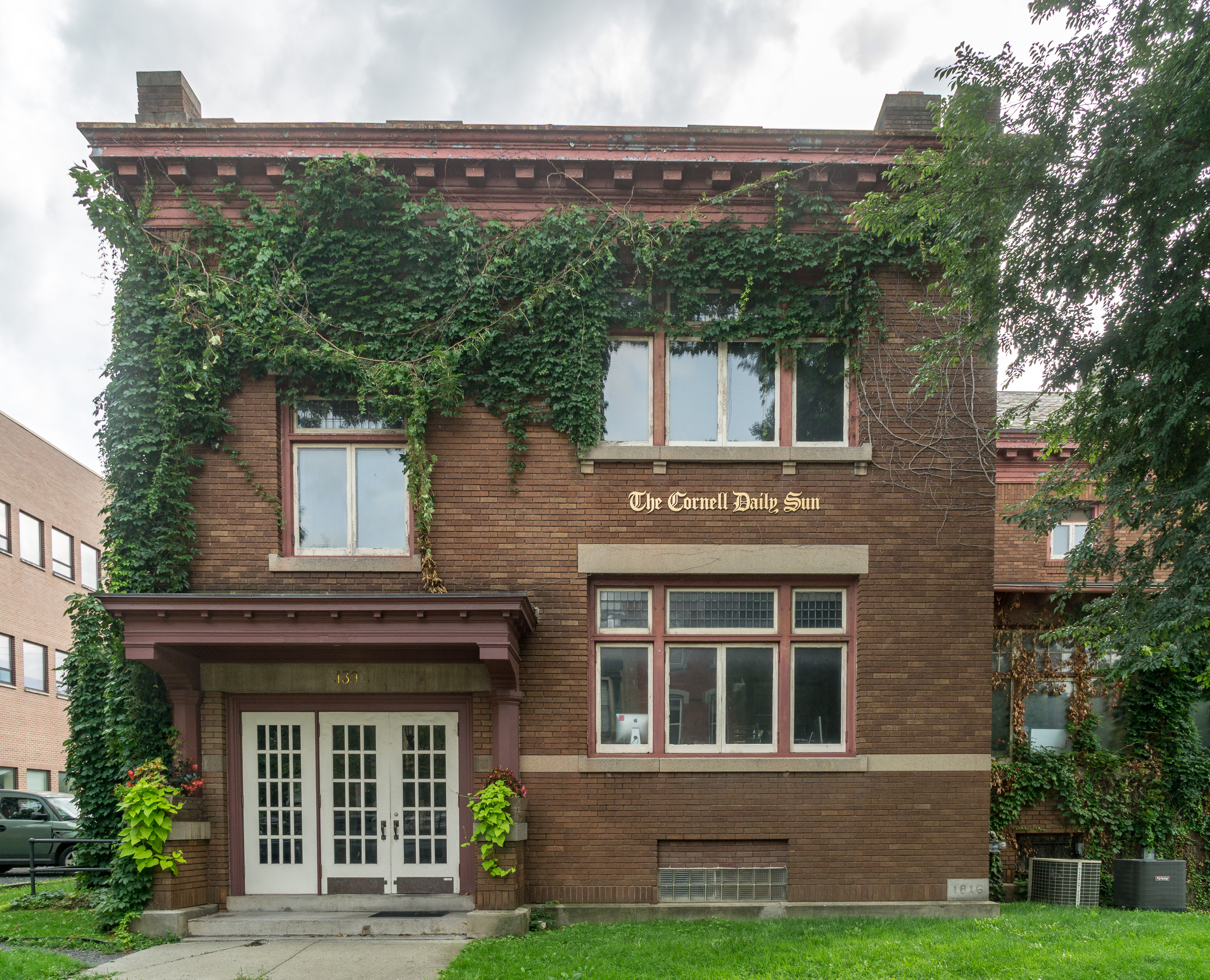
The headquarters of The Cornell Daily Sun, founded in 1880 at Cornell University, the oldest continuously published college student newspaper in the United States

A student publication is a media outlet such as a newspaper, magazine, television show, or radio station produced by students at an educational institution. These publications typically cover local and school-related news, but they may also report on national or international news as well. Most student publications are either part of a curricular class or run as an extracurricular activity.

Student publications serve as both a platform for community discussion and a place for those interested in journalism to develop their skills. These publications report news, publish opinions of students and faculty, and may run advertisements catered to the student body. Besides these purposes, student publications also serve as a watchdog to uncover problems at the respective institution. The majority of student publications are funded through their educational institution. Some funds may be generated through sales and advertisements, but the majority usually comes from the school itself. Because of this, educational institutions have specific ways in which they can influence the publications through funding.

Many high schools and colleges offer online editions of their publications in addition to printed copies. Online content is typically more accessible to the student body, and production of the content is easier and cheaper.

== Australia ==
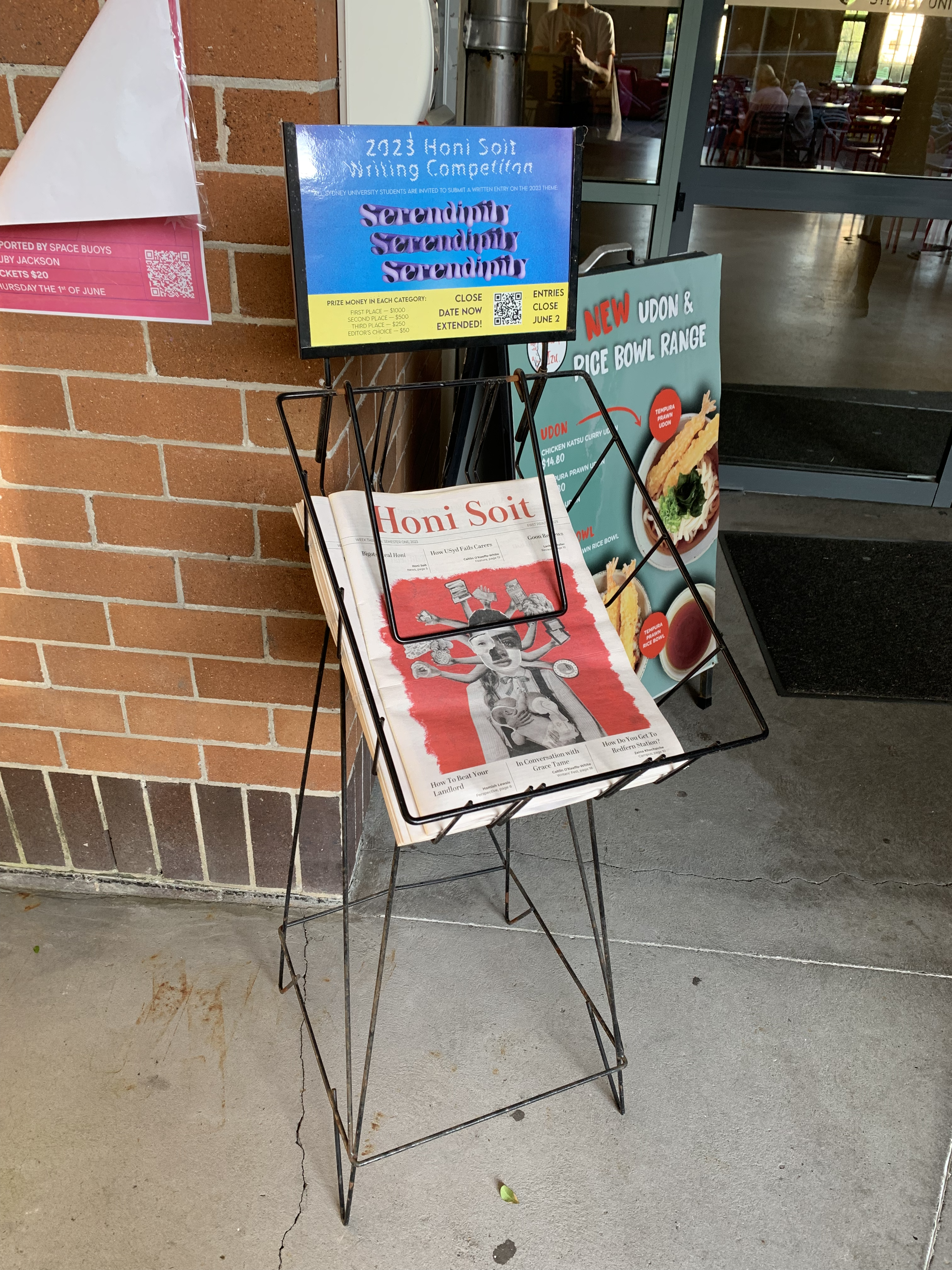
An Honi Soit stand at the University of Sydney

University student newspapers in Australia are usually independent of university administration yet are connected with or run by the student representative organisation operating at the campus. Editors tend to be elected by the student body on a separate ticket to other student representatives and are paid an honorarium, although some student organisations have been known to employ unelected staff to coordinate the production of the newspaper (an example of this is the national Student View newspaper).

=== Controversy ===
Australian student newspapers have courted controversy since their inception. One of the more notorious of these controversies involved the publication of an article which allegedly incited readers to shoplift. The July edition of the magazine was banned by the Office of Film and Literature Classification following a campaign by conservative talkback radio hosts and other media to have the material banned. The four editors of the July 1995 edition of La Trobe University student magazine Rabelais were subsequently charged with publishing, distributing and depositing an objectionable publication. An objectional publication was defined in this case, as one that incites criminal activity. The editors lodged an appeal, which led to a protracted four-year court case. The appeal was eventually defeated by the full bench of the Federal Court, who refused the editors' application to appeal to the High Court of Australia. The charges were eventually dropped in March 1999.

== Canada ==
Many student newspapers in Canada are independent from their universities and student unions. Such autonomous papers are funded by student fees won by referendums, as well as advertising, and are run by their staffs, with no faculty input.

About 55 of Canada's student newspapers belong to a co-operative and newswire service called the Canadian University Press, which holds conferences, has correspondents across the country, is run democratically by its member papers, and fosters a sense of community among Canadian student journalists.

The oldest continually published student newspapers in Canada are The Varsity (1880), The Queen's Journal (1873), and The Dalhousie Gazette (1868). The oldest student publication in Canada is The Brunswickan, which was founded in 1867 as a monthly but then switched to a weekly newspaper.

The only Canadian student newspaper that continues to print on a daily schedule is The Gazette at the University of Western Ontario.

== Ireland ==
Student publications are produced at Ireland's universities and Institutes of Technology as well as to a lesser extent at Colleges of Further Education. These publications include The College Tribune and The University Observer at University College Dublin, Trinity News and The University Times at Trinity College Dublin, The College View based at Dublin City University and Sin Newspaper at NUI Galway. Other publications include The Edition (stylised as the eDITion), at Dublin Institute of Technology and the UCC Express and Motley Magazine at University College Cork.

Each publication reports on affairs at its host university and on local, national and international news of relevance to students and many student journalists have gone on to work in Ireland's national press. All student publications in Ireland are funded by or linked to their host university or its students' union, with the exception of UCD's College Tribune which operates independently. Irish student publications are invited each year to enter the national Student Media Awards, run by a Dublin-based marketing firm Oxygen.ie under various categories.

== South Korea ==
Almost every university in South Korea runs a student based press. Although many of these press are funded by the school, the students press has a significant amount of say amongst the student body.

== United Kingdom ==
Student newspapers in the United Kingdom are often given a constitutionally guaranteed editorial independence from the universities and students' unions whose students they represent, although the majority are financially dependent on their students' union. Notable British student newspapers that are financially as well as editorially independent from their respective student unions are Cherwell (Oxford Student Publications Ltd), Varsity (Varsity Publications Ltd; Cambridge), The Tab (Tab Media Ltd; national) and The Gown (Queen's University Belfast).

In 2003, The National Student, the UK's first independent national student newspaper, was launched (closed 2019). Scotcampus a similar publication based in Scotland was founded in 2001 (closed 2016). In 2009, The Student Journals was founded as an independent online magazine for students, but started allowing international writers one year after launch (closed 2014).

== United States ==
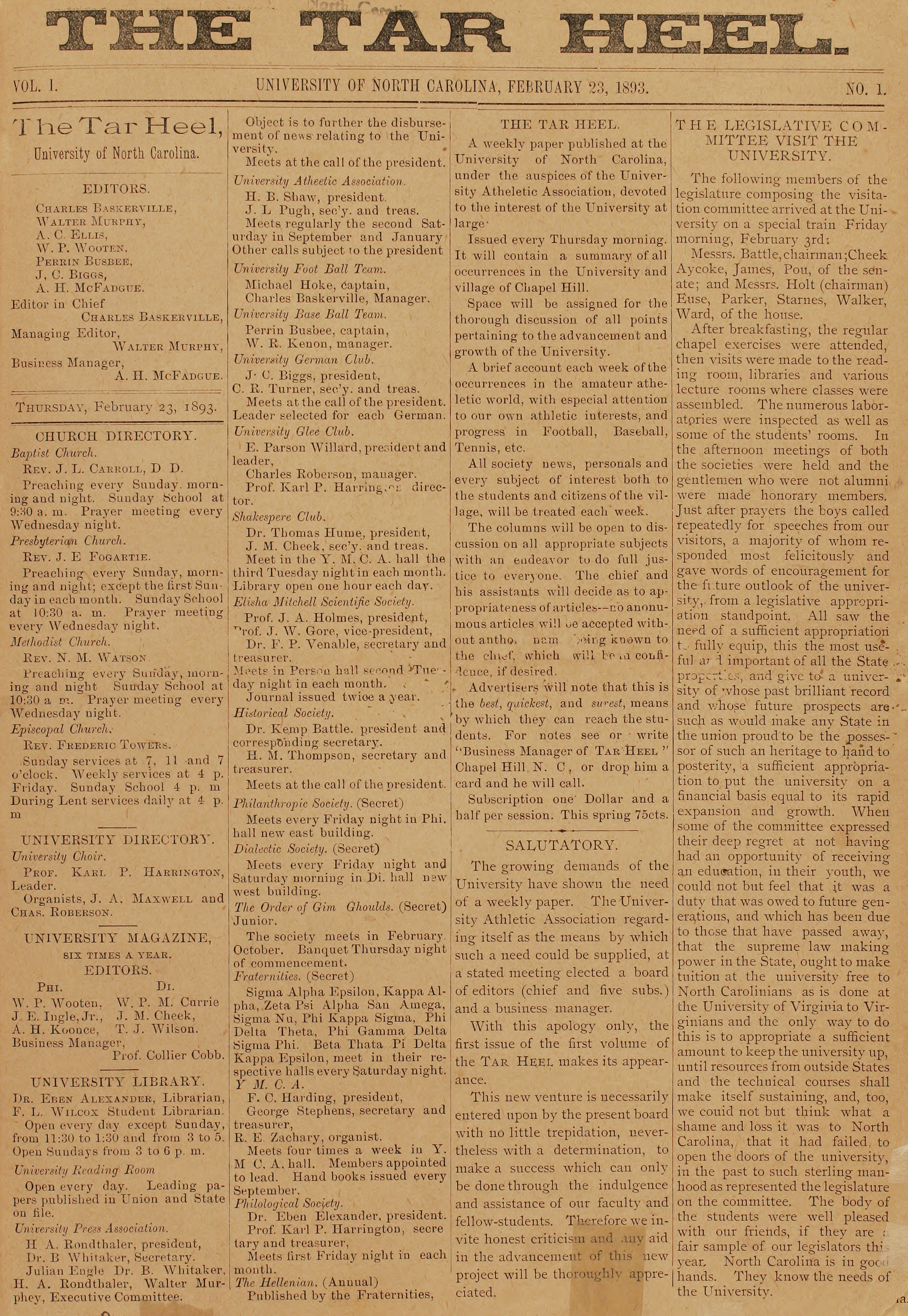
Front page of the first edition of The Daily Tar Heel, a student newspaper of the University of North Carolina, from 1892

Student publications in the United States include high school newspapers, such as Tattler, Berkeley High Jacket, The Spectator (Stuyvesant High School), The Exonian, and The Classic.

=== Case law ===
==== Tinker v. Des Moines Independent Community School District ====
Tinker v. Des Moines concerns a group of students who wanted to wear black armbands to school in 1965 to protest United States involvement in Vietnam. After school officials heard about the planned silent protest, they suspended the students involved. A few of the students involved sued and the Supreme Court sided with the students, saying that provided that these speech acts did not distract themselves or others from academic work, the real purpose of the school, then students were free to wear and say want they liked in school. This is considered the benchmark case in issues of student free speech and contains the famous phrase "students do not shed their constitutional rights at the schoolhouse gate."

==== Hazelwood School District v. Kuhlmeier ====
Hazelwood School District v. Kuhlmeier, heard by the United States Supreme Court in 1987 concerned a public school newspaper that attempted to print two controversial stories about issues of teen pregnancy and divorced families. It was the custom of the principal to look over the proposed paper before publication. With little time left before the publication deadline, the principal decided that the two stories, though names had been changed to protect the stories' subjects, were inappropriate for the paper's younger readers; under direction of the principal, the paper was printed without the offending stories. The students filed suit, but the Supreme Court stood by the principal's ruling, that, because of time constraints, the only proper course of action was to not print the stories. It was decided that the students' First Amendment rights had not been infringed. This case is often cited by high schools and universities to support the custom of prior review.

==== Interaction of court rulings ====
Hazelwood and Tinker offer conflicting versions of student free expression. Student-directed publications may indeed be considered open or limited public forums for student expression, offering students freedom of expression under both Hazelwood and Tinker.

Hazelwood, for example, does not say administrators must review or censor their papers before publication. In fact, journalism education organizations, like the Journalism Education Association, argue that prior review has no legitimate educational merit and is only a tool leading to censorship.

Under certain limited conditions and situations presented by Hazelwood, school administrators may be permitted prior review of (mostly high school) student publications.

Until June 2005, the Hazelwood standard was not considered to apply to public college and university newspapers, a decision most recently affirmed in the 2001 appeals court decision in Kincaid v. Gibson. However, in June 2005, the 7th Circuit Court of Appeals ruled, in Hosty v. Carter, that the Hazelwood standard could apply to student publications that were not "designated public forums," and in February 2006 the Supreme Court declined to hear the students' appeal. At this time, the Hosty decision applies only in the states of Illinois, Indiana and Wisconsin.

In response to the Kincaid decision, the California State Legislature passed AB 2581, which extended existing state-level statutory protection of high school student journalists to college and university students. The bill was signed into law by Governor Arnold Schwarzenegger and took effect on January 1, 2007.

Controversy over alleged censorship actions has led some student newspapers to become independent organizations, such as The Exponent of Purdue University in 1969, The Daily Californian of the University of California, Berkeley in 1971, The Daily Orange of Syracuse University in 1971, The Independent Florida Alligator of the University of Florida in 1973, The Cavalier Daily of the University of Virginia in 1979, The Paisano of the University of Texas at San Antonio in 1981, and The Mountaineer Jeffersonian of West Virginia University in 2008.

Some states have laws which enhance the U.S. Constitution in protecting student expression documented by the Student Press Law Center.

==== John Silber and university newspapers ====
University administrations have learned to get around constitutional protections and effectively diminish critical student newspapers by following the example of former Boston University President John Silber, who on the advice of Harvard Law School Professor Alan Dershowitz, eliminated all funding for student newspapers in the 1970s in an attempt to suppress on-campus criticism. Silber's policy went so far as to ban student organizations funded by the university from placing advertisements in the student press. With his hands-off policy, Silber was able to eliminate the independence of The Daily News and financially crippled the more-radical b.u. exposure. The exposure sued Silber and the university for infringement of their First Amendment rights, but the courts of the Commonwealth of Massachusetts eventually dismissed their case.

=== Issues of diversity in student newspapers ===
Studies by the Journal of Blacks in Higher Education (JBHE) focusing on African American students have found that as few as 2.6% of editors of all student newspapers are of African-American descent, with other minorities showing similar trending. These numbers are not much higher at schools with credited journalism schools. In these institutions, only 4.4% of editors are of African American descent. Both of these percentages are significantly below the percentage of population African-Americans make up in the total United States. Such skewed demographics in these publications could result in newspapers that only reflect the outlooks and values of a particular segment of the student population. The JBHE did not suggest any type of affirmative action program for student publications at the study's release in 2004.

== In popular culture ==
- TV series Beverly Hills, 90210: Andrea Zuckerman (Gabrielle Carteris) is the school newspaper editor.
- Argentinean TV series Rebelde Way: Pilar Dunoff (Micaela Vázquez) writes a newspaper anonymously, filled with gossip about her classmates.
- TV series Smallville: Chloe Sullivan (Allison Mack) is the editor of the school newspaper The Torch.
- Beware the Gonzo is about a geek at his high school who decides to establish an underground paper of his own.
- TV series Riverdale: Betty Cooper (Lili Reinhart) and Jughead Jones (Cole Sprouse) are editors of Riverdale High's previously dormant school newspaper, The Blue & Gold.

== See also ==
- Canadian University Press
- Censorship of student media in the United States
- Journalism
- Journalism Education Association
- List of student newspapers
- National Student Press Week
- Society of Collegiate Journalists
- Student Press Law Center
