= List of television series canceled after one episode =

Some television series are canceled after one episode, quickly removed from a broadcast schedule, or had production halted after their premieres. Such immediate cancellations are rare, and usually attributed to a combination of negative reviews, poor ratings, radical or controversial content, and circumstances beyond the network's control.

Purposely excluded from this list are pilots, premiere episodes produced primarily to be reviewed by network executives as proposed series, "backdoor pilots", pilot episodes shot in such a way that they can be aired as a regular episode of another series, and feature-length television movies produced to be broadcast as either an extended premiere episode, if picked up as a series, or as a distinct television movie. In any of those cases, the pilot was aired but its proposed series was not subsequently added to the programming, or the pilot was aired as a television movie after a decision not to produce a series.

== Canceled after one episode ==
The Dennis James Carnival (October 31, 1948)
A variety show presented by CBS, The Dennis James Carnival showcased various vaudeville-style acts under the premise that host Dennis James was trying to keep afloat a carnival that he had inherited from his uncle. The reaction to the program was mostly negative, and its sponsor, General Electric, was dissatisfied with the carnival setting. A Variety article at the time noted that "this marked the quickest on-and-off commercial fade in young tele's history."
Who's Whose (June 25, 1951)
A panel quiz show hosted by Phil Baker that aired on CBS in which four celebrity panelists (Robin Chandler, Basil Davenport, Art Ford, and Emily Kimbrough) tried to determine which of three contestants was married to a fourth contestant. This show replaced The Goldbergs, which was dropped when its creator Gertrude Berg refused to fire the blacklisted actor Philip Loeb. While one source has classified this show as a television pilot, contemporary news accounts confirm that this was a series that was dropped by its sponsor (General Foods) after one airing.
Turn-On (February 5, 1969)
An ABC variety comedy series; a racier derivative of Rowan & Martin's Laugh-In, the show alarmed broadcast officials and sponsors who immediately perceived it as offensive because of its strong sexual and political humor. At least one station (WEWS-TV in Cleveland, Ohio) made known their cancellation of Turn-On as the program aired (and inspiring an urban legend that WEWS pulled the program after the first commercial break), and others on west coast delay refused to air it at all. ABC canceled the show before airing another episode.
The Melting Pot (June 11, 1975)
A BBC sitcom written by Spike Milligan, who also starred as Mr. Van Gogh, a Pakistani illegal immigrant in London, whom Milligan portrayed in brownface alongside John Bird. Aired as a one-off pilot on BBC1, a further series of five episodes was commissioned and produced in 1976, but these remaining five episodes have never been seen.
Co-Ed Fever (February 4, 1979)
A CBS sitcom that attempted to imitate the then-successful National Lampoon's Animal House. The pilot was aired as a "special preview" of the upcoming season, but the series was canceled shortly thereafter. The other five completed episodes remain unaired in the United States, but were shown in Vancouver, British Columbia, Canada on BCTV in a late-afternoon weekend timeslot.
Heil Honey I'm Home! (September 30, 1990)
A comedy on British satellite channel Galaxy that spoofed American sitcoms of the 1950s and 1960s by featuring caricatures of Adolf Hitler and Eva Braun who live in matrimonial bliss until they become neighbours to a Jewish couple. The series was canceled not only due to controversy but also due to British Satellite Broadcasting's merger with Sky; seven other episodes were filmed but not aired.
Australia's Naughtiest Home Videos (September 3, 1992)
A spin-off of Australia's Funniest Home Videos hosted by Doug Mulray that depicted videos of sexual situations and other sexually explicit content (such as animal privates, people playing with condoms, and various wardrobe malfunctions.) Kerry Packer, the owner of Nine Network at the time, ordered the program to be taken down partway through its first and only episode while watching it, as he was so offended by its content, he phoned the network's master control and angrily demanded "Get this shit off the air!" Most stations pulled the sole episode at varying points, airing an episode of Cheers for the remainder of the timeslot.
Public Morals (October 30, 1996)
A Steven Bochco-produced CBS sitcom about a vice squad unit of the New York City Police Department. The cast included Bill Brochtrup, reprising the role of John Irvin, a recurring character on another Bochco series, NYPD Blue. Thirteen episodes were produced, and the pilot was originally scheduled to air first, but several affiliates refused to show it. CBS then decided to air a different episode from the thirteen produced, which was the only one aired. Brochtrup and his character returned to NYPD Blue, becoming a regular member of the cast.
Lawless (March 22, 1997)
A Fox action series starring former American football star Brian Bosworth as a private investigator.
Dot Comedy (December 8, 2000)
An ABC series featuring an early attempt to translate humorous material from the internet to a mass television audience.
Comedians Unleashed (October 8, 2002)
An attempt by Animal Planet to mimic Comedy Central's stand-up comedy shows, but with animal-themed jokes. The episode was rerun a few times before being removed from the programming lineup. This is not to be confused with the 2006 syndicated series Comics Unleashed, hosted by Byron Allen.
The Will (January 8, 2005)
A CBS reality show in which family members and friends competed to be named the beneficiary of a will. The series eventually aired in its entirety on Fox Reality Channel, and aired in New Zealand as well.
Emily's Reasons Why Not (January 9, 2006)
An ABC sitcom starring Heather Graham as a single career woman, unlucky in love, who employs a list-making system to help her determine when it is time to give up and move on. The series was canceled on January 10 by ABC programming chief Steve McPherson when he decided that it was "not going to get better and we needed a quick change". It was reported that ABC executives had committed to the show without seeing its pilot.
El invento del siglo (June 18, 2006)
A talent show produced for Antena 3, which sought to reward a great invention that "changed and improved people's living quality". Initially planned to run for three episodes, only the first was aired due to poor ratings.
The Rich List (November 1, 2006)
A game show by the British producers of The Weakest Link and Dog Eat Dog, adapted for the US from an ITV pilot that was not picked up. Despite being heavily promoted on Fox during the World Series, the show was axed on November 3 following low ratings. GSN revived the show in 2009 as The Money List, hosted by Fred Roggin; this iteration, the first GSN original to employ a returning-champion aspect, lasted nine episodes. The remaining episodes from the original series remain unaired. After the US version's failure, the format was produced for broadcast in the UK, where it aired as Who Dares Wins for 12 years, from 2007 to 2019.
The Debbie King Show (March 5–6, 2007)
Aired in the UK on the controversial channel ITV Play with no publicity, the show (like all the others on the channel) was a live premium rate phone-in quiz presented by Debbie King who had previously hosted the popular Quizmania. As well as being a quiz, viewers were invited to phone/text in views towards current events. However, earlier the same day ITV announced that transmission of the ITV Play channel was being suspended after that evening's programmes as a result of an investigation into its premium-rate phone services. Despite this, ITV still decided to push ahead with the launch of the series. The following week, it was decided that the ITV Play channel would permanently cease transmission due to the numerous irregularities involving call-in/SMS quiz shows in the UK. Although ITV Play did continue as a limited service on ITV1 The Debbie King Show ended after only 2 1/2 hours on the air.
Quarterlife (February 26, 2008)
An NBC broadcast version of the popular MySpace series, with an intent to air on Sunday nights following its debut as a stopgap solution to present some 'new' form of programming during that season's writers' strike. Following the dismal reception of the premiere episode, the other five episodes were aired in a marathon on NBC Universal sibling channel Bravo on March 9.
Secret Talents of the Stars (April 8, 2008)
A CBS reality talent show where celebrities competed by participating in talents that differed from their profession. Although the show was to follow a seven-week tournament-style structure with home-viewer voting (which would have taken the show through May 13 with a May 22 "grand finale"), the series was pulled after its debut because of extremely low ratings.
Osbournes Reloaded (March 31, 2009)
A Fox variety show hosted by The Osbournes – Ozzy, Sharon, Jack, and Kelly. The remaining five episodes were immediately shelved because of a combination of bad reviews and several Fox affiliates (including the entire Raycom and Local TV LLC station chains) either airing the program in an early-morning timeslot or not at all because of content concerns.
1000 Ways to Lie (March 3, 2010)
Spike's spin-off to the show 1000 Ways to Die was immediately canceled after its first episode due to very negative reviews and poor ratings. The original show ran for 74 episodes between May 2008 and July 2012, though the final four episodes were burned off by the network, with the show being canceled not long afterwards.
GosDep (State Department) with Ksenia Sobchak (September 7, 2012)
A political talk show aired on MTV Russia; only one episode titled "Where is Putin leading us?" aired, the show having been cancelled thereafter.
Kookyville (November 25, 2012)
An unscripted comedy sketch show that aired on Channel 4 in the UK. The tag line for the show was "These people are not actors or comedians, and there's no script ... they're just real funny people." The show was met with negative reviews and was canceled after a single episode had aired.
Ford Nation (November 18, 2013)
A talk show hosted by Mayor Rob Ford of Toronto and his brother, city councillor and future Premier of Ontario Doug Ford, on Sun News Network in Canada, initially indicated as being a weekly program airing Monday nights. The Ford brothers had been in the news because of an ongoing scandal involving a video showing the mayor smoking crack cocaine. Despite garnering record ratings for the fledgling news/opinion channel, the show was nonetheless canceled after a single episode, reportedly because of unexpectedly high production costs (the one-hour program was reported to have taken five hours to record and an additional eight hours to edit) and advertiser concerns about being associated with the controversial politicians. Network executives, as well as Doug Ford, would later claim that the program only had a one-episode commitment and was not necessarily intended as a long-term series.
Breaking Boston (March 13, 2014)
A reality show produced by Mark Wahlberg for A&E about four young women working to change their lives in the eponymous city. Seven episodes were subsequently made available on the Hulu website; by June 1, 2015, the seven episodes were switched to the A&E website, and later on became available for purchase on other commercial websites.
Mesmerised (October 15, 2015)
An Australian hypnosis show helmed by British hypnotist Peter Powers broadcast on the Seven Network. It was dropped after one episode, which featured a man marrying an alpaca as its centerpiece, following dismal ratings. Five produced episodes remain unaired.
Host the Week (June 22, 2017)
Channel 4 in the UK commissioned a topical unscripted comedy series in which a different guest host each week, joined by a troupe of improvisational comedy performers, would introduce comedy and entertainment features, without having had access to a script or rehearsals. Episodes were produced during the week of transmission to remain topical. Scarlett Moffatt was the host of the first edition of three billed; the underperformance of this programme, down more than 60% on the average audience of the slot, saw production of the billed second edition – to be hosted by Jack Whitehall – scrapped, and a third show – the host of which was not confirmed ahead of time – also did not air.
Barstool Van Talk (October 17, 2017)
ESPN2 canceled the sports humor and commentary show, a collaboration with the sports website Barstool Sports and hosted by Pardon My Take podcasters, Dan Katz and PFT Commenter, after one episode had aired, following internal and social media protests from ESPN employees over the perceived misogynistic nature of Barstool's content.
Back with the Ex (April 18, 2018)
An Australian reality series in which four sets of ex-partners attempted to give their broken relationships a second chance. The underperformance of this episode resulted in the remaining episodes being moved to Channel Seven's streaming service.
Ahora, la Mundial (June 20, 2018)
A football talk show that Telecinco planned to air after Spain's matches in the 2018 FIFA World Cup. It was heavily criticized for relying on panelists not linked to sports journalism but to the network's gossip shows such as Kiko Matamoros or Alessandro Lecquio. Telecinco commentator and former Spain coach José Antonio Camacho refused to appear on the show via satellite from Russia after hearing about the program's format. After the criticism and the poor ratings of its premiere, Telecinco scrapped the show altogether.
Herman Cain's America (June 27, 2020)
A conservative talk show hosted by businessman, media personality and presidential candidate Herman Cain on Newsmax TV. One episode was produced before Cain fell ill with COVID-19; he died on July 30, 2020.
The Chop: Britain's Top Woodworker (October 15, 2020)
A Sky History reality series in which woodworkers were to participate in competitions to determine the best woodworker in the United Kingdom. The series was suspended on October 20, 2020, as one of the contestants had an "88" face tattoo that was questioned by viewers for having neo-Nazi and white supremacist symbolism, though the contestant claimed it was an innocent tribute to his father's 1988 death. The entire series was canceled 10 days later on October 30, 2020, after it was found out the contestant's father (who was estranged from him) was alive and well, and his other head tattoos suggested further white supremacist symbols and numbers.
La Campos móvil (March 10, 2021)
A Telecinco talk show hosted by María Teresa Campos, which was filmed inside a transparent box in the back of a moving truck, where Campos would interview her guests. The pilot episode was aired as part of Telecinco's daily afternoon show Sálvame, featuring President of the Community of Madrid Isabel Díaz Ayuso as guest, and had a poor ratings performance in its allocated timeslot. Days after the premiere, it was reported that Telecinco had put the show on hiatus while they considered possible tweaks to the format or outright cancellation. The show never returned to air and Campos died in 2023.
Let's Make a Love Scene (May 13, 2022)
A reality dating show for Channel 4, hosted by Ellie Taylor, in which single contestants are paired up and tasked with recreating sensual scenes from popular films, with the assistance of intimacy coordinator Rufai Ajala and acting coach Emma Crompton. Two episodes were ordered, and billed for broadcast on May 13 and 20 in a 10 p.m. slot; after the first edition was negatively received, the second episode was pulled from the May 20 schedule, replaced with an episode of 8 Out of 10 Cats Does Countdown. Unlike some shows pulled from the schedule, the second episode was never put out via its streaming service, with the format shelved in 2023. In 2024 it emerged that the episode screened was in fact the intended second episode, with the first having been dropped from the schedules after a former partner of one of the participants raised concerns around his past behaviour with producers.
Storms from Space (May 2, 2025)
5 had scheduled the second episode for 9 May 2025 at 8 p.m., but pulled the programme in favor of a repeat of Electric Cars: Which One Should You Buy?, a consumer advice show with Alexis Conran.

== Canceled after a two-episode premiere night ==
The following series were canceled after their first two episodes had aired back-to-back on one evening:

Beware of Dog (August 13, 2002)
An Animal Planet sitcom; two episodes presented back-to-back for the only appearance of the series on US television. The show featured Look Who's Talking-style observations (voiced by Park Bench) by a stray dog named Jack who was adopted by a suburban family.
Anchorwoman (August 22, 2007)
A Fox comedy/reality series about Lauren Jones, a model who became a television news anchor. The show was canceled on August 23 because of a disappointing 2.0 Fast National rating; however, its premiere was one hour, consisting of two 30-minute episodes.
The Bussey Bunch (January 22, 2008)
A TLC reality show about the Busseys, a family that promotes a local professional wrestling federation in Texas. The series was pulled following its premiere showing, with a scheduled showing on January 29 also pulled.
The Xtacles (November 9, 2008)
An Adult Swim spin-off of Frisky Dingo. The only two episodes aired back-to-back on November 9, 2008. In early 2009, Adult Swim declined to fund the production of any episodes beyond the first two. Around the same time, 70/30 Productions—‌which produced the show—‌closed down.
The Hasselhoffs (December 5, 2010)
An A&E reality series starring David Hasselhoff and his two daughters was canceled after only two episodes aired. The first two episodes aired back-to-back on the same night leaving eight episodes unaired. A&E stated that it planned on airing the other eight completed half-hour episodes at a later date; however, that never took place. The full series aired in the United Kingdom on May 30, 2011, on The Biography Channel.
Videos After Dark (March 12, 2019)
An ABC spin-off of America's Funniest Home Videos with more mature tones, hosted by original AFV host Bob Saget. Two episodes of the series premiered on March 12, 2019, promoted as an hour-long "special first-look"; ABC stated that the series would return later in the year, but this did not come to fruition.

== Special cases ==
Because of more complex situations, such as shows canceled independently in separate countries, the following programs can be said to have been canceled after one episode under a special set of circumstances only.

You're in the Picture (January 20, 1961)
A CBS panel show starring Jackie Gleason, where celebrities placed their faces into photo stand-ins and attempted to guess the scene they were in. The premiere received such negative reviews that Gleason used the same timeslot on January 27 to air a self-deprecating "apology" for the previous week's show, agreeing that it was "without a doubt, the biggest bomb in history", and "would make the H-bomb look like a two-inch salute". Gleason used the timeslot to revive The Jackie Gleason Show as a talk show to fulfill the remainder of his contract.
Who's Your Daddy? (January 3, 2005)
A Fox reality series that involved an adopted woman trying to identify her biological father amongst a group of impostors. The show attracted protest from adoptive families and adoption rights groups before airing. This episode aired as a "special", not a "series premiere", and as such the series can be said to have been canceled before airing an episode. The rest of the series would later air on Fox Reality Channel in late 2005, including two episodes of Who's Your Mommy?
Korgoth of Barbaria (June 3, 2006)
An Adult Swim animated show parodying the post-apocalyptic and sword and sorcery genres, focusing on the titular barbarian hero Korgoth. Aired as an uncommitted pilot, the show was announced as having been picked up as a series on June 18 of the same year. However, no further episodes were actually produced, and a 2010 "bump" on the network listed Korgoth in its list of canceled programming (for being "too expensive"). Though only one episode was ever produced, the show was formally picked up and later formally canceled, making its distinction between pilot episode and canceled series unclear.
Viva Laughlin (October 22, 2007)
A CBS musical comedy-drama that takes place at a casino in Laughlin, Nevada, based on the BBC series Blackpool. While CBS canceled the Hugh Jackman-produced series after two episodes had aired, Australia's Nine Network aired the first episode on October 22 and then canceled it the following day.
Soul Quest Overdrive (May 24, 2011)
An Adult Swim spin-off of Aqua Teen Hunger Force, featuring the voices of David Cross, Kristen Schaal, H. Jon Benjamin, and Gavin McInnes. After losing a 2010 online pilot contest to Cheyenne Cinnamon and the Fantabulous Unicorn of Sugar Town Candy Fudge, six episodes of the show were ordered by the network regardless. Four of them aired back-to-back at 4 AM on May 24, 2011, during Adult Swim's "DVR Theater" block, leaving at least one unaired. No further episodes of the show were made. Cast member Gavin McInnes confirmed that Soul Quest Overdrive was canceled, and incorrectly blamed its cancellation on the other cast members not being "as funny" as him.
Taskmaster (August 2, 2020)
A British comedy game show, which had been imported by The CW to air over the summer in the United States. After underperforming in comparison to other series it had imported (to cover for delayed programs due to the COVID-19 pandemic), The CW pulled the series on August 5 and replaced it with reruns of Supernatural. The series has been a critical success in its home country of the United Kingdom, where it has run for over 20 seasons and won a British Academy Television Award for Best Comedy. The series has also been successfully adapted in other countries including Australia, New Zealand and Sweden. The CW later placed the episodes it had acquired on its video on demand platform. Comedy Central (owned by The CW's then co-parent company ViacomCBS) had previously attempted an American version of the series in 2018, but it was canceled after one season.
The Big Posh Holiday Swap (January 28, 2024)
This was to be a six-part series on Channel 5 about the ThirdHome home exchange service, whose members swap their holiday homes with other clients of ThirdHome, with most of the properties costing more than £1 million. After debuting at 10pm on January 28, 2024, the second episode was pulled from its 10.30pm timeslot on February 4, 2024 and replaced with a repeat of Nicola Bulley: The Disappearance That Gripped Britain, the investigative documentary which had been first broadcast on Channel 5 on February 2, with episode 3 being replaced by the 2008 Jason Statham film The Bank Job the week after. Even though The Big Posh Holiday Swap was a new for 2024 Channel 5 series, the majority of the show's footage was taken from the American television series Millionaire Holiday Home Swap with changes added for the British market, though as Millionaire Holiday Home Swap was added to various streaming services as a box set all at once, it is likely that the January 28, 2024, broadcast was the only time any episodes of either named series was shown on a terrestrial television service.

== Placed on hiatus after one episode ==
The following series are sometimes included on lists of shows canceled after one episode, but strictly speaking do not belong there. The following series were stopped after a single episode aired, but were later brought back by the originating networks, and aired their remaining episodes on the originating networks some months later (usually during a non-ratings period).

Melba (January 28, 1986)
A CBS sitcom starring Melba Moore as a single mother who runs a New York information bureau; the series premiered on the day of the Space Shuttle Challenger disaster. The five remaining episodes aired during the summer.
South of Sunset (October 27, 1993)
A CBS private-detective show starring Glenn Frey of rock band The Eagles. Despite being heavily promoted during the World Series, the show was canned not only because of bad ratings but because news coverage of wildfires in Malibu had pre-empted it on much of the West Coast (although KCBS in Los Angeles showed the pilot on October 30 at 11:30 PM). The remaining five episodes aired on VH1 a year later.
The Great Defender (March 5, 1995)
A Fox legal drama starring Michael Rispoli as a My Cousin Vinny-type lawyer. The premiere aired opposite 60 Minutes and received dismal ratings. Fox removed the series from the air after its first episode, later airing the remaining episodes during the summer.
Antique Inspectors (April 25, 1999)
The BBC filmed a series of the antiques programme hosted by Jill Dando, who was killed the day after the first episode was broadcast. The BBC halted the broadcast of further episodes until later on in the year.
Family Forensics UK (2005)
A LivingTV reality show, it was canceled in November 2005 after one episode had been broadcast when the producers discovered that private investigator Michael Brown had been convicted that October of six child sex offences. Brown was in breach of his contract for not telling the producers about this, and Living TV apologized for broadcasting the one episode. Pulling the show cost Living £600,000.
It's Now or Never (July 22, 2006)
A British light entertainment ITV1 programme presented by Phillip Schofield; two episodes were produced to be aired in a Saturday night timeslot during the summer of 2006, but only the first was aired owing to ratings of 1.7 million viewers, or 10% of the available audience. The second episode was eventually aired later in the year, on December 30, 2006.
The Master (August 16, 2006)
An Australian quiz show hosted by Mark Beretta on the Seven Network, which was axed after the premiere received low ratings (744,000 viewers). The following six episodes were eventually broadcast on the network, albeit in non-ratings periods. Ironically, the second and third episodes (December 12 and 19) showed an increase in ratings by approximately 95,000 viewers.
Proving Ground (June 14, 2011)
A G4 popular science reality show hosted by Ryan Dunn and Jessica Chobot in which stunts from video games, films and comic books are tested in the real world. The series was pulled from G4's schedule after Dunn was killed in an unrelated car accident shortly after the airing of the first episode. G4 began airing the remaining eight episodes in July 2011 and it was discontinued after, with Chobot instead becoming a correspondent with X-Play to fulfill her contract with G4 for its last year of existence with original programming.
Aquí mando yo (April 15, 2016)
A Spanish adaptation of Gogglebox for Antena 3 hosted by Miki Nadal in voiceover form. This program filmed different groups of friends or families watching and critiquing television shows aired during the week. Antena 3 announced the series would go on hiatus three days after the premiere episode underperformed in ratings.
The Week We Went Wild (January 9, 2017)
A Channel 5 (UK) reality documentary series in which members of troubled and dysfunctional families were sent out to the jungles of Panama in order to work through their grievances in the context of a survival scenario. Four editions were commissioned and produced, but after the first underperformed in ratings, the remaining editions were abruptly withdrawn from the intended 9pm Monday timeslot and replaced by other content: the unshown episodes did ultimately appear before the month was out, however, airing in a 3 am slot on January 17, 24 and 31, 2017.
Dale Winton's Florida Fly-Drive (February 8, 2018)
A Channel 5 travelogue series featuring presenter Dale Winton touring Florida. The first episode aired as planned, with further editions scheduled to follow on subsequent Thursdays, but the series was pulled from the February 15 schedule following the Stoneman Douglas High School shooting the previous day. After Winton's death in April 2018, Channel 5 confirmed that it would air the remaining episodes at "an appropriate time". The unaired editions ultimately appeared on Channel 5 and 5Select in June 2018.
Maxxx (April 2, 2020)
A Channel 4 sitcom/boyband satire with O-T Fagbenle. The series was launched on E4 in April 2020, after being heavily advertised on the youth TV channel, but was pulled from the schedule after one episode had been shown (with the slot used for reruns of Brooklyn Nine-Nine). The series, which could be found as a box-set on All4, was relaunched on Channel 4 during Black History Month, with the first episode being repeated on October 29, 2020, and the missing second episode due a week later.
Sex & Power (August 31, 2021)
This was a three-part documentary series about celebrity and newspaper tabloid culture made for Channel 5 and due to be shown over three nights. The first episode was called Celebrity Wars and featured interviews with Kerry Katona, Ulrika Johnson and Danniella Westbrook. It was listed in the schedules with back-to-back repeats of 1990s series Red Shoe Diaries, with both timeslots replaced by shows about emergency services on September 1, 2021, though the three episodes of Sex & Power were put on streaming service My5 with the episodes available until June 2026. Sex & Power was scheduled against Channel 4's fly-on-the-wall school documentary Sixteen: Class of 2021, another show which lost its 9pm slot after one episode, though Channel 4 moved the next episode to a late night slot a week later and continued to broadcast the remainder of the four-part series at this time. The first episode of Sex & Power was repeated on Channel 5 under the name Celeb Wars: Sex and Scandal on August 5, 2023 a couple of weeks after the repeat of this programme was dropped from the schedule at short notice. The channel decided against continuing the series, which would have seen the second episode being broadcast on Channel 5 for the first time on August 12, 2023, with their 2022 documentary Top of the Pops: Secrets & Scandals being repeated in the same late night timeslot a week later, with Radio Times also having this show listed under a revised title, which was Top of the Pops: Most Shocking Moments.
Wondrous Wales (February 12, 2022)
This is a Channel 4 series produced in the style of its More4 documentaries The Pennines: Backbone of Britain, The Yorkshire Dales and The Lakes and Devon and Cornwall. After moving the Devon and Cornwall series to their main channel with a new voiceover from John Nettles, the channel decided to commission a series about Wales under the title Epic Wales: Valleys, Mountains and Coast. This series was initially broadcast in a prime Friday night slot at 8pm, in the hour before their comedy shows, but was dumped by the channel before the series was completed and replaced by reruns. In February 2022, the channel scheduled a new version of the show under the title Wondrous Wales with a Saturday night slot at 8pm. After one episode, it was removed from the schedule.
Halo (June 22, 2022)
This Paramount+ streaming series was launched as a new series on Channel 5 on June 22, with no intention of the channel broadcasting the subsequent episodes. This kind of marketing (where a series looks like a new free-to-air series, but really is a one-off teaser for a subscription service) was the subject of a Feedback letter in the Radio Times of July 9–15, 2022 with an unnamed viewer complaining that this was just a 'puff piece' to get people to subscribe to a paid service, an act which could be against the channel's PSB commitments. In addition to Channel 5, this broadcasting arrangement has also historically been used by Channel 4, with foreign-language series presented under the Walter Presents strand receiving a one-off premiere on the channel and then the rest of the episodes appearing on the All 4 platform (though unlike Paramount+, this is an ad-funded free streaming service). ITV has also utilised this tactic with their acquisitions; in February 2026, ITV1 broadcast two episodes of Yellowjackets back-to-back in a late slot, as a means to promote its availability on the network's on-demand platform ITVX, and in April 2026 previewed sitcom DMV in primetime (the series' remaining episodes did receive a linear broadcast, but in a signed form in an overnight, graveyard slot).
Naughty Tories (November 19, 2022)
This was a three part series, made by Rex/Zinc Media for Channel 5, examining political scandals of the past, with the first episode about The Major-Currie Affair. The programme was dropped from its slot after one episode, though the second programme about Jeffrey Archer was broadcast in 2023 as part of a night devoted to sleaze. On Saturday August 26, 2023, the second episode was repeated under the new prefix of Scandal, with the first re-run a week later, yet was not followed the week after by the planned episode covering Neil and Christine Hamilton. In addition to these political documentaries, the commission also included Frank Bough: National Treasure, National Disgrace as part of the order from Zinc Media. This programme was broadcast by Channel 5 on February 11, 2023, but as part of the channel's ongoing bouquet of nostalgic 1970s and '80s programming (with other documentaries including Noel Edmonds: The Rise and Fall of Mr Saturday Night and Hughie Green: Mr Entertainment) rather than as part of this series rebranded under the Scandal title.
Vamos a llevarnos bien (February 7, 2023)
A comedy show from Televisión Española that was halted after its first episode due to underperforming in the ratings. Host Ana Morgade announced that the format was to be reworked in the following months, and she would not be taking part in its future relaunch. In late April, it was reported that Lorena Castell would be taking over hosting duties from Morgade. Eventually the show returned to air on July 20, 2023, as a weekly late-night show, staying on air until August 31.

== See also ==
- Lost television broadcast
- List of television series canceled before airing an episode
- List of television shows notable for negative reception
- List of longest-running United States television series
- List of longest-running British television programmes
- List of longest-running Indian television series
