= Edmonton Sun =

Canadian daily newspaper

- The Edmonton Sun cover from June 26, 2010, on the Edmonton Oilers pick of Taylor Hall.
- Type: Daily newspaper
- Format: Tabloid
- Owner: Postmedia Network
- Editor-in-chief: Dave Breakenridge
- Founded: 1978
- Language: English
- Headquarters: 350-4990 92 Avenue; Edmonton, Alberta; T6B 3A1
- Circulation: 36,566 weekdays 35,359 Saturdays; 45,353 Sundays (as of 2015)
- ISSN: 0839-4776
- Website: edmontonsun.com

The Edmonton Sun is a daily newspaper and news website published in Edmonton, Alberta, Canada. It is owned by Postmedia following its 2015 acquisition of Sun Media from Quebecor.

It began publishing Sunday April 2, 1978 and shares many characteristics with Sun Media's other tabloids, including an emphasis on local news stories, its conservative editorial stance, extensive sports coverage, and a daily Sunshine Girl.

In 2014, Postmedia Network, the owner of the Edmonton Journal, purchased several newspapers and websites from Quebecor. This made it that both the Edmonton Sun and its main competitor, the Edmonton Journal were both owned by Postmedia. In 2016, it was announced that the Journal and Sun's newsrooms and operations would be merged while both newspapers would continue to be published. This also led to the cuts of many staff between the two papers.

== Circulation ==
The circulation of Edmonton Sun has declined. Its total circulation dropped by 34 percent to 37,649 copies daily from 2009 to 2015.

As of 2023, Edmonton Sun has a daily circulation of approximately 50,000 copies, and its readership includes a diverse mix of ages and demographics. The newspaper is available for purchase at newsstands and convenience stores throughout the city, as well as through home delivery.

Daily average

== See also ==
- Ottawa Sun
- Calgary Sun
- Toronto Sun
- Winnipeg Sun
- List of newspapers in Canada
