= Stanway =

Stanway may refer to:

== Places in England ==
- Stanway, Essex
- Stanway, Gloucestershire

== People ==
- Georgia Stanway (born 1999), English association football player
- Mark Stanway (born 1954), British musician
- Peter Powers (real name Peter Stanway), British television personality who purports to be a hypnotist

== Other ==
- Stanway House, a Jacobean manor house near Stanway, Gloucestershire
- Stanway Rovers F.C., a football club based in Stanway, Essex
