= Zapaday =

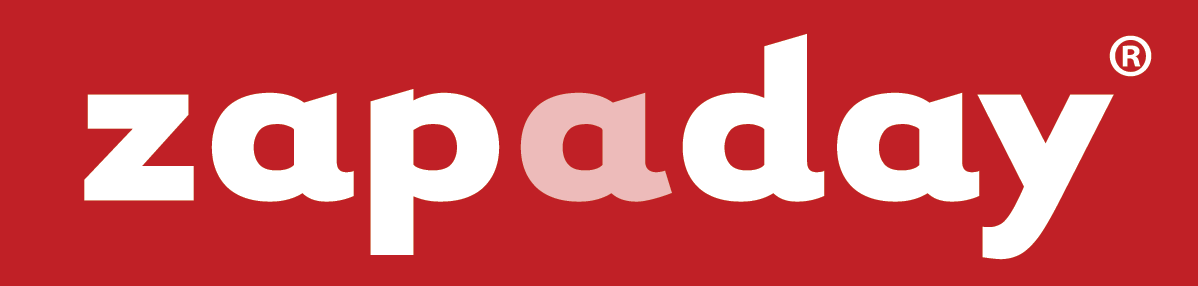
- Company type: Private
- Website type: Future News & Events
- Available in: English
- Founded: May 2011
- Headquarters: Amsterdam, {{{location_country}}}
- Founder: Stefan Hoevenaar
- Key people: Piet Hein van Dam, Chief Executive Officer; Maja Micudova, Managing Editor
- Employees: 20
- Website: zapaday.com
- Current status: Active

Zapaday is a global news calendar. The website publishes upcoming news headlines per day and per topic as a resource for journalists, bloggers, political analysts, marketers, event organisers, public relation professionals, scientists and travellers. Zapaday uses both bots and human editors to monitor over 4,000 news sites and calendars for future news stories, publishing its findings as news events on categorized calendars.

Users can create and publish their own events and calendars, re-using events and calendars of others for personal use. On March 6, 2014, Zapaday launched a new subscription service with paid premium news calendars. The company also announced a new marketplace where journalists can syndicate curated news calendars as premium content. The new model invites journalists and content creators to publish premium calendars and receive 50 per cent of earnings, while Zapaday will receive 20 per cent for hosting and handling. The remaining 30 per cent go to the seller, who can be either the content creator themselves, Zapaday, or one of the news agencies or other resellers that offer a white-label version of Zapaday to their clients.

Calendar events from Zapaday can be exported to a user's Outlook, Google Calendar, or a mobile phone at any time.

Zapaday won an award as most promising start-up company across Europe at Tech Media Europe 2011 and was a 2012 Accenture Innovation Awards finalist.

In December 2013, Zapaday, together with UK's GRNlive, the Foreign Correspondents Network, launched a new global reporting service where each future news event on Zapaday is accompanied with GRNlive journalists available in the region to cover the story on the ground.

On 23 January 2013, Zapaday, together with Dutch press agency Algemeen Nederlands Persbureau (ANP), launched the renewed ‘ANP Agenda’ based on the Zapaday platform. The ANP Agenda includes planned domestic and sports news events, curated by ANP editors, and foreign and economic events curated by both ANP and Zapaday editors. Nearly 1.000 users from ANP, including journalists, broadcasters and communication professionals, now use the platform to spot upcoming news events and plan ahead.

== See also ==
- Reuters
- Algemeen Nederlands Persbureau
- Agence France-Presse
- Associated Press
- Recorded Future
