= Calgary Sun =

Canadian newspaper

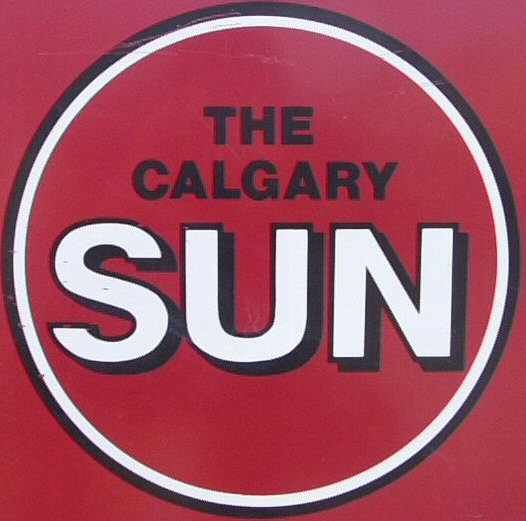

- Type: Daily newspaper (Tuesdays to Sundays)
- Format: Tabloid, digital
- Owner: Postmedia
- Editor-in-chief: Lorne Motley
- Managing editor: Martin Hudson
- Founded: 1980
- Headquarters: Calgary, Alberta
- Circulation: 41,675 weekdays 42,744 Saturdays; 51,819 Sundays (as of 2015)
- ISSN: 0832-2422
- Website: calgarysun.com

The Calgary Sun is a daily newspaper published in Calgary, Alberta, Canada. It is currently owned by Postmedia Network. First published in 1980, the tabloid-format daily newspaper replaced the long-running tabloid-size The Albertan soon after it was acquired by the publishers of the Toronto Sun. The newspaper, like most of those in the Canadian Sun chain, is known for short, snappy news stories aimed primarily at working-class readers. The layout of the Calgary Sun is partially based on that of British tabloids.

== History ==
The newspaper that would become the Calgary Sun was first published in 1886 as the Calgary Tribune. Prior to its 1980 acquisition by Sun Media, the newspaper was published under the following titles:

- 1886-1895: Calgary Tribune
- 1895-1899: Alberta Tribune
- 1899: Albertan
- 1899-1902: Albertan and Alberta Tribune
- 1902-1920: Morning Albertan and Weekly Albertan
- 1920-1924: Morning Albertan and Western Farmer and Weekly Albertan
- 1924-1927: Calgary Albertan and Western Farmer and Weekly Albertan
- 1927-1936: Calgary Albertan
- 1936-1980: Albertan
- 1980: Calgary Albertan

== Sunshine Girl ==
A signature feature of Sun-branded newspapers including the Calgary Sun is the "Sunshine Girl," a daily glamour photograph of a female model. The feature uses locally photographed models (both amateur and professional) as well as photographs shot for the national chain. Originally situated on page 3 (similar to the British tabloids the Sun chain originally set out to emulate, which also featured glamour photos on their third page), in the 1990s the feature was relocated to the Sports section. A "Sunshine Boy" feature appeared sporadically in the 1980s and 1990s.

== Local weeklies ==
For many years, the Calgary Sun also published a local weekly, The Calgary Mirror, which covered community news. Sun Media purchased the newspaper in the early 1990s. This publication, which originated in the 1950s and was known at one time as North Hill News, was discontinued in 2001. It was succeeded by FYI Calgary In-Print, a free weekly newspaper intended to be the print equivalent of the Sun's much-publicized FYI Calgary news website (there was also an FYI Toronto newspaper published to tie in with the Toronto Sun's website). The new publication was rejected by readers and advertisers and was discontinued in May 2001 during a downsizing of Sun Media. The website abandoned the FYI concept about a year later and rebranded itself as calgarysun.com.

== Format ==
On October 2, 2006, the Calgary Sun underwent a major redesign, adopting the logo already being used by other Sun newspapers and revamping the typeface for its body text and headlines. In February 2007, Sun Media launched a Calgary edition of its free daily, 24 Hours, which shares editors and editorial staff with the Calgary Sun. Sun Media ceased publishing the Calgary edition of 24 Hours in 2013.

== Distribution ==
The Calgary Herald was produced on a daily basis until 2012, when it ceased printing a Sunday edition. Distribution is by subscription, direct sale (such as at newsstands), or newspaper box. The latter was the target of public debate by the City Council in early 2008, when at least one alderman claimed that newspaper boxes were responsible for increased levels of litter on public transit.

== Circulation ==
The Calgary Sun, like most Canadian daily newspapers, has seen a decline in circulation. Its total circulation dropped by 16 percent to 43,277 copies daily from 2009 to 2015.

Daily average

== Notable staff ==
- Hal Sigurdson, sports editor of The Albertan (1964 to 1966)

== See also ==
- Ottawa Sun
- Toronto Sun
- Edmonton Sun
- Winnipeg Sun
- List of newspapers in Canada
