= Reallocation (media) =

Reallocation is a term in the media industry used to describe the practice of relocating an unsuccessful series that was originally developed for a broadcast network onto a cable network in hopes of gaining the attention and interest of a niche audience as well as growing a larger audience.

Reasons for reallocation are not always due to cancellation. Reallocation is also used to regain expenses lost due to production fees on under performing content. In some cases reallocation is used in order to promote an unsuccessful series.

Although not a common practice,
