= Charles Adler (broadcaster) =

Canadian senator and broadcaster

The Honourable Charles Adler
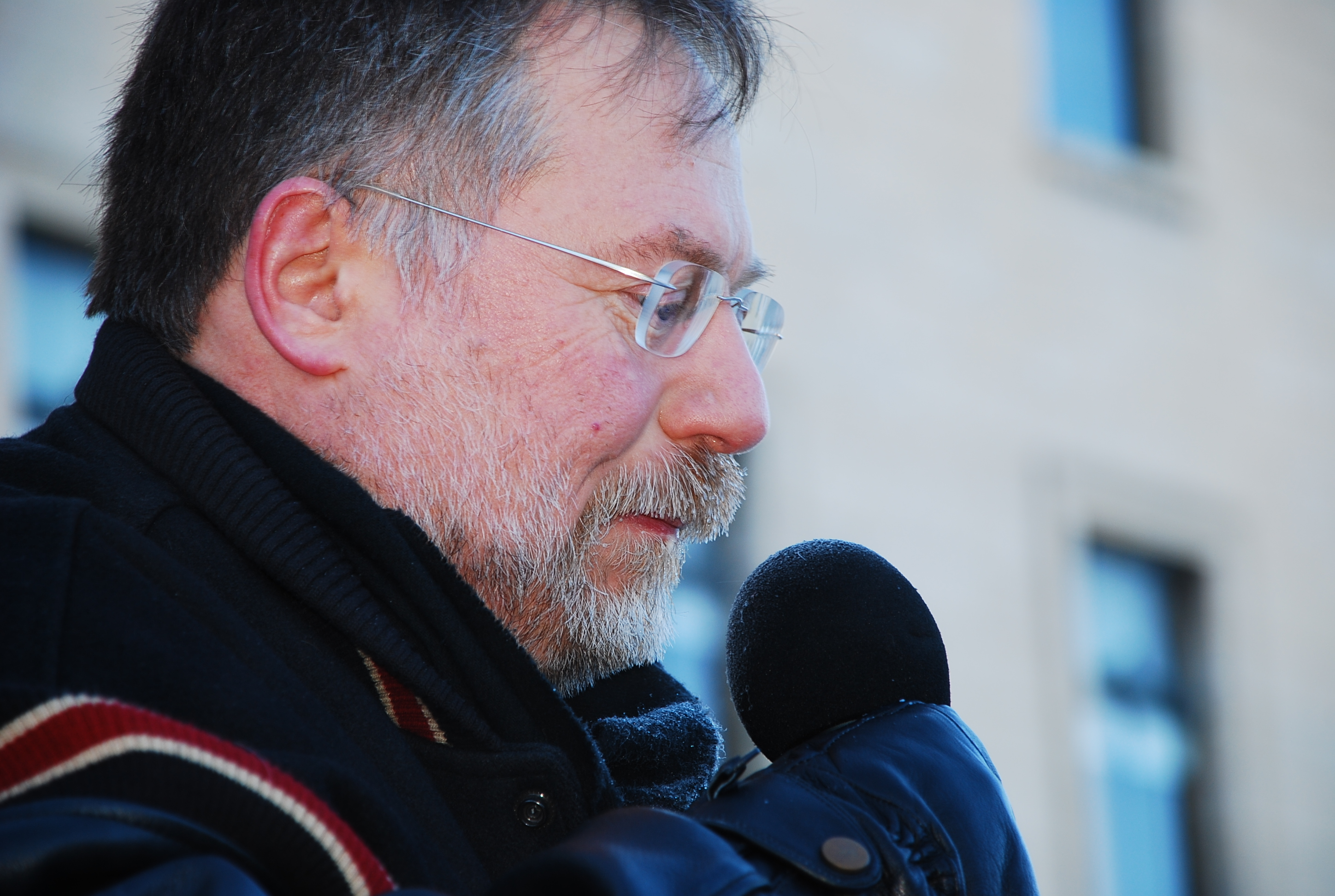
- Adler in 2008

Canadian Senator from Manitoba
- Incumbent
- Assumed office 17 August 2024
- Nominated by: Justin Trudeau
- Appointed by: Mary Simon

Personal details
- Born: 25 August 1954 (age 72) Budapest, Hungary
- Party: Canadian Senators Group
- Education: McGill University
- Occupation: Broadcaster; columnist
- Website: https://charlesadler.com/

Charles Adler (born 25 August 1954) is a Canadian politician and broadcaster, and columnist. On the recommendation of Prime Minister Justin Trudeau, Adler was appointed to the Senate of Canada by Governor General Mary Simon on 17 August 2024.

== Early life ==
Adler was born in Budapest, Hungary, to Jewish parents who were survivors of the Holocaust. After the 1956 Hungarian Revolution, his family fled the country – carrying infant Charles in a backpack across the border to Austria – and were accepted as refugees in Canada in 1957. They settled in Montreal, Quebec, where Adler grew up and learned English. He attended McGill University and began his broadcasting career as a student at the campus radio station in the early 1970s.

== Career ==
Adler's professional radio career started in Montreal and Calgary. In 1973, he joined Montreal station CKGM as a producer, and the next year he landed his first on-air job hosting a weeknight rock music show on CKXL in Calgary. Over the subsequent years, he worked at several Canadian stations – including CJAD in Montreal and stations in Hamilton, London, and Toronto – developing a reputation as a talk radio personality. In 1989, Adler returned to Calgary to launch a new talk-radio program called Hot Talk.

In the 1990s, Adler spent several years working in the United States. He hosted a nationally syndicated radio show based in Tampa, Florida, that aired on over 120 stations. In 1994, he debuted a nightly television talk show, Adler on Line, on a Boston station; the next year, he won a regional Emmy Award for Best TV Host in New England for that program. Adler returned to Canada in 1996 to host The Charles Adler Show on CFRB in Toronto. Two years later, in 1998, he moved to Winnipeg, Manitoba, where he began hosting a daily talk show, Adler On Line, on CJOB 680 AM. Adler became a fixture on CJOB and would remain associated with that station for many years. In 2001, he also became the inaugural host of Global Sunday, a national Sunday-morning current affairs television program on the Global Television Network. Throughout this period, Adler made frequent guest appearances as a pundit on Canadian TV programs, including on CTV and occasionally guest-hosting on the U.S. show Hannity & Colmes.

In 2004, Corus Radio launched Adler as a nationally syndicated host. His show, variously known as Adler Online or The Charles Adler Show, aired across the Corus talk network. In April 2011, Adler began hosting a nightly TV show on Sun News Network. The program ran until the channel's closure in 2013, after which Adler returned to CJOB.

In October 2015, Adler launched a new talk show on SiriusXM Canada radio. That program ended after one year, and in late 2016, Adler joined Global News Radio as host of a new nightly show, Charles Adler Tonight, based at CKNW Vancouver. That program aired until September 2021, when Adler announced his retirement from daily broadcasting.

In 2023, Adler began writing a weekly opinion column for the Winnipeg Free Press and launched an independent podcast, also titled The Charles Adler Show.

=== Honours and recognition ===
In 1998, Adler was presented with the Key to the City of Toronto. He received the Queen Elizabeth II Diamond Jubilee Medal in 2012. In May 2017, he was awarded the Lifetime Achievement Award from the Radio Television Digital News Association of Canada.

== Senate of Canada ==
On 17 August 2024, Prime Minister Justin Trudeau announced the appointment of Charles Adler to the Senate of Canada. Adler was named to represent the province of Manitoba and sits as a non-affiliated member. His appointment was made by Governor General Mary Simon through the merit-based selection process introduced in 2016.

Adler's appointment was met with both praise and criticism. Minister of Northern Affairs Dan Vandal questioned the choice, suggesting other Manitobans were better suited. The opposition Conservative Party also criticized the appointment, calling Adler a "Liberal friend."

The Assembly of Manitoba Chiefs (AMC) strongly opposed the appointment, citing a 1999 CJOB broadcast in which Adler referred to Indigenous leaders as "uncivilized boneheads." The AMC described these remarks as racist and called on the prime minister to rescind the appointment. Adler issued a statement acknowledging responsibility and offered to meet with First Nations leaders.

The Canadian Broadcast Standards Council reviewed the incident in 2000 and ruled that the comments, while abrasive, fell within fair comment.

On 26 May 2025, Adler joined the Canadian Senators Group.

== Political views ==
For much of his broadcasting career, Adler was viewed as a prominent conservative voice in Canadian media. In a 2021 analysis, columnist Shannon Sampert referred to Adler as "Canada's Rush Limbaugh" but noted his break with the Conservative Party in 2015. Adler has explained that while his values did not change, the party took a "hard right" turn that no longer aligned with his principles.

Since then, Adler has described himself as a centrist. He has publicly opposed Islamophobia and authoritarian populism and has endorsed candidates from multiple parties as a stand against extremism.
