= Ford Nation =

2013 Canadian political-opinion television programme

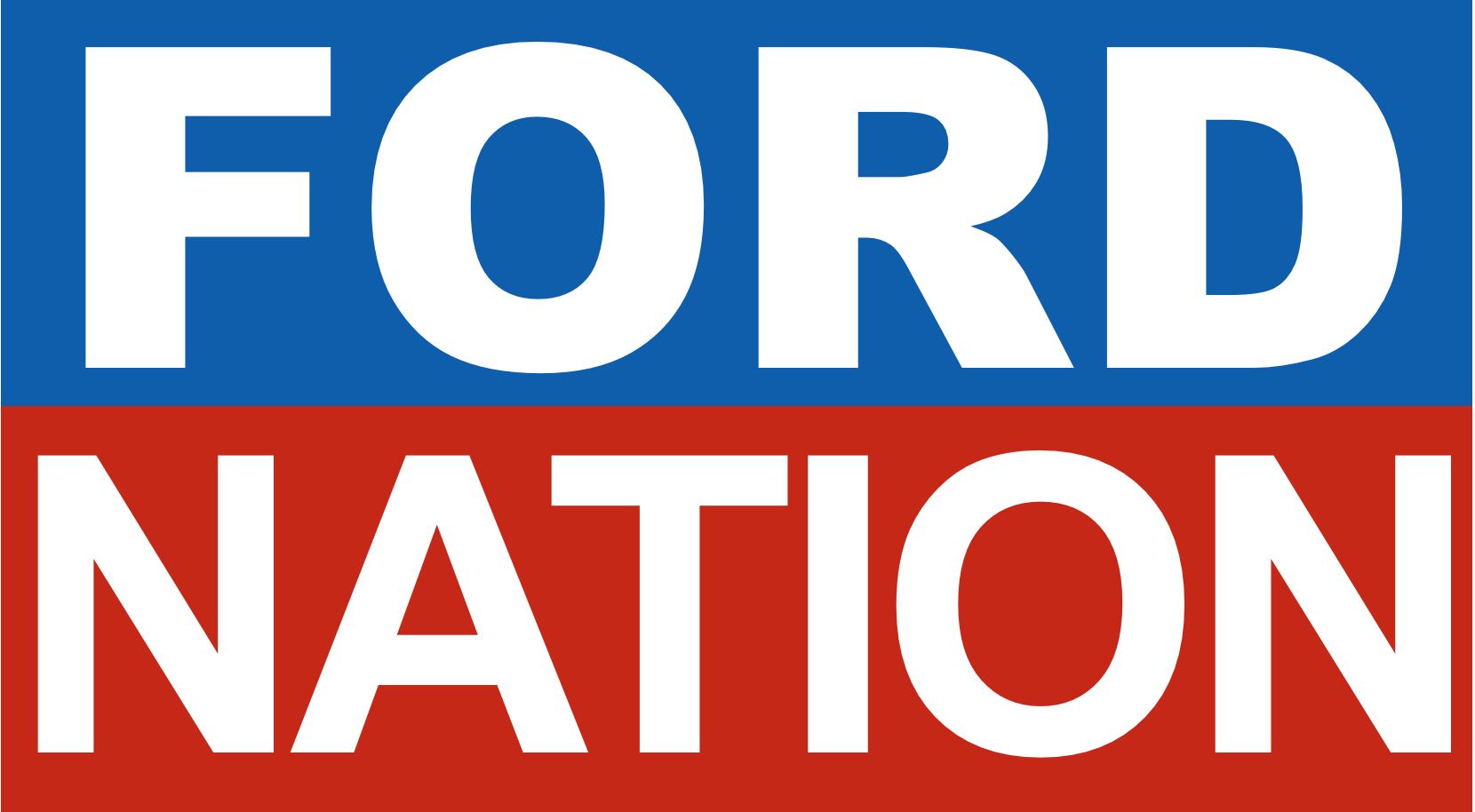
- Genre: Talk show web series (revival)
- Presented by: Rob Ford; Doug Ford Jr.
- Country of origin: Canada
- Original language: English
- No. of seasons: 1
- No. of episodes: 1 (TV series); 5 (YouTube)

Production
- Production locations: Toronto, Ontario
- Running time: 1 hour (TV), 1-5 minutes (YouTube)

Original release
- Network: Sun News Network
- Release: November 18, 2013
- Network: YouTube
- Release: February 10 – April 3, 2014

Related
- The City with Mayor Rob Ford (CFRB radio)

Ford Nation is an opinion and discussion programme that aired on the Canadian news channel Sun News Network. The show featured two sitting Toronto politicians, mayor Rob Ford and his brother, city councillor Doug Ford Jr., and was pulled from the network after only one airing on November 18, 2013. An online version of the show aired on YouTube for five episodes between February and April 2014. The title is a reference to the ardent, mainly suburban supporters of the Fords and their positive conservative goal.

== Background ==
From February 2012 to November 3, 2013, the Fords hosted The City, a weekly two-hour Sunday afternoon show on CFRB radio which Rob Ford described as "an unfiltered take on the work we do every day at Toronto City Hall." After months of controversy involving the mayor, criticism of the station for letting the Fords use the show as a "bully pulpit" where their political allies were promoted and opponents cut down, and complaints to the Canadian Broadcast Standards Council alleging the show breached its code of ethics, CFRB announced in November 2013 that it and the Fords had "mutually determined" to end The City.

On November 14, the brothers were tapped by Sun News Network to host a weekly pre-taped one-hour program on the TV network, to be titled Ford Nation.

== Content ==
The lone airing of Ford Nation was broadcast on Monday, November 18, 2013, taking the 8PM (ET) slot normally occupied by Sun News Network's The Source with Ezra Levant. The format included a back-and-forth dialogue between Rob Ford and Doug Ford, with the former readmitting the personal mistakes he has made as mayor ("It is what it is. I've admitted to my mistakes."). Segments included discussions with Levant and Toronto Sun columnist Joe Warmington. Levant's appearance included a commentary critical of the Toronto Star's investigations into Rob Ford, with Levant likening the media's treatment of the mayor over his recent controversies to the paparazzi's hounding of Princess Diana.

== Cancellation and revival as web series ==
On November 19, 2013, less than 24 hours after Ford Nation's debut, Sun News Network announced it was cancelling the program after just one episode. Sun News cited high production costs involved with the premiere episode; the show, taped one day before its airing, reportedly took five hours to record and an additional eight hours to edit. Additionally, the show met with advertiser resistance to being associated with the controversial politicians. Doug Ford, in a later conversation with the National Post, insisted that the brothers entered into the project with Sun with the understanding that Ford Nation was a "one-off" project, one that was not intended to evolve into prolonged status.

Despite the show's expense and its immediate cancellation, Ford Nation's sole episode attracted an audience of 155,000 viewers for the original broadcast, plus an additional 45,000 for its replay on prime time in Western Canada and 65,000 downloads of the program online. The audience was, according to Sun News vice-president Kory Teneycke, "by far the most successful thing, from an audience perspective, the network has ever done," topping a 2012 charity boxing match between Liberal MP Justin Trudeau and Conservative Senator Patrick Brazeau.

Rob Ford's celebrity status had, according to Doug Ford, caught the eye of several reality television producers in both Canada and the United States. Councillor Ford stated that the brothers passed on those offers, but took an interest in suggestions by videographers for an online program that would retain the Ford Nation title and be posted weekly on YouTube. The program employed a format similar to what the Fords enjoyed on CFRB's The City, with the Fords "[getting] the message out" on various topics in a "professional, yet simple" presentation, with occasional interactions with guests and audiences.

Councillor Ford announced the new show would be released on YouTube "before Christmas" 2013. A series of short videos of under 5 minutes in length was launched on YouTube on February 10, 2014. In one segment, Mayor Ford admitted lying about his drug use. Others were lighter in tone and included predictions for the Stanley Cup playoffs and other remarks. In the second video, Ford named 18 councillors he wanted defeated, offering his support to any campaign opposing them. Each weekly "episode" consisted of 3 to 5 short videos of 1 to 5 minutes in length. Comments were disabled; however, the brothers occasionally answered viewer emails in the segments. The National Post described the program as "a bizarro world version of Wayne's World".

Five episodes of the web series aired, with some episodes broken up into several parts. No new episodes were filmed after April 2014 when Rob Ford entered rehab following the emergence of a second video of him smoking crack cocaine.

== See also ==
- 2014 Toronto mayoral election

== Notes ==
- Video of announcement
- Loewen, Peter (August 16, 2013). "'Ford Nation' is bigger than you think". Ottawa Citizen. Archived from the original on March 25, 2018.
- "It's time for Ford Nation to say 'enough'". The Province. Postmedia Network. November 4, 2013. Archived from the original on January 11, 2014.
