= Andrea Slobodian =

Canadian television reporter

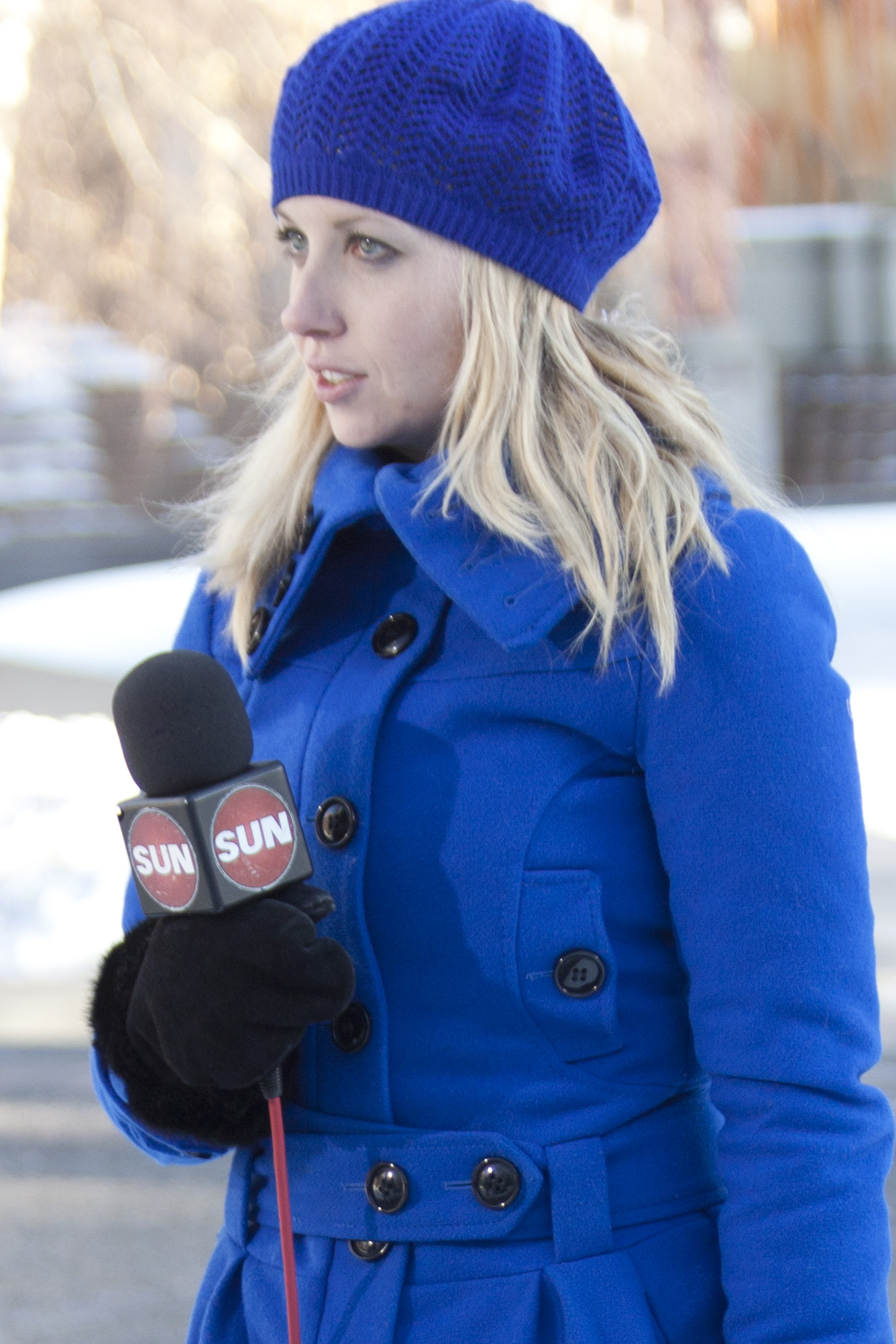
- Slobodian reporting for Sun News from Olympic Plaza (Calgary) on December 9, 2011
- Occupations: Communications and Stakeholder Relations at the Manitoba Legislature
- Employer: Government of Manitoba
- Website: @AndreaSlobodian on Twitter

Andrea Slobodian is a Canadian former television reporter. In October 2012, she became the late night anchor for CTV News in Winnipeg. Previously she was a reporter and commentator for The Roundtable on Sun News Network. She currently works for the Manitoba Legislature in the Communications and Stakeholder Relations department.

== Early life ==
Slobodian is in the third generation of her family to live in Canada. They came from Ukraine and settled in Manitoba, where she was raised. She graduated from Collège Jeanne-Sauvé in Winnipeg, then took Red River College's Creative Communications program, majoring in journalism. She received her Bachelor of Arts in Communications from the University of Winnipeg.

== Career in media ==
Slobodian worked as a television news reporter, producer, and anchor for Citytv Winnipeg, before and after its acquisition by Bell Media in 2006. Later, Slobodian was hired by Global Winnipeg, first in a term position in 2007, and then as a full-time weather anchor. She stayed with Global until being hired in 2009 to become Shaw TV Calgary's first weather anchor. She worked briefly for CBC Calgary until 2011, when she was hired by Sun News Network to co-host a new morning show, from Calgary. Called The Roundtable, the show was also co-hosted by Alex Pierson and Pat Bolland, both in Toronto. She moved on to CTV Winnipeg in October 2012 to be their Late Night Anchor.
