= Sun News Network =

Defunct Canadian cable news TV channel

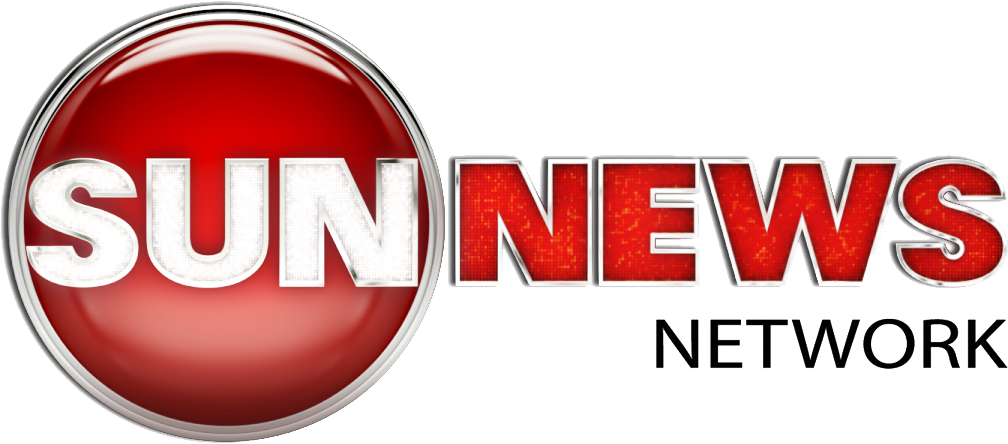
- Country: Canada
- Broadcast area: Nationwide
- Headquarters: Toronto, Ontario

Programming
- Language: English
- Picture format: 1080i (HDTV); 480i (SDTV/4:3 letterbox)

Ownership
- Owner: Québecor Média; TVA Group (51%); Sun Media (49%)

History
- Launched: April 18, 2011
- Replaced: "Sun TV" (CKXT-DT)
- Closed: February 13, 2015

Sun News Network (commonly shortened to Sun News) was a Canadian English language Category C news channel owned by Québecor Média through a partnership between two of its subsidiaries, TVA Group (which maintained 51% majority ownership of the company) and Sun Media Corporation (which held the remaining 49% interest). The channel was launched on April 18, 2011 in standard and high definition and shut down February 13, 2015. It operated under a Category 2 (later classified as Category C) licence granted by the Canadian Radio-Television and Telecommunications Commission (CRTC) in November 2010, after the network aborted a highly publicized attempt for a Category 1 licence (later classified as Category A) that would have given it mandatory access on digital cable and satellite providers across Canada.

Sun News was distributed by most major cable and satellite providers across Canada but was included in channel tiers subscribed by only 40% of all Canadian households (5.1 million homes with a pay television subscription). Quebecor had sought wider distribution for Sun News since its launch, most notably making an unsuccessful request for mandatory carriage on basic cable and satellite tiers in 2013. Sun News was simulcast on CKXT-DT (channel 51), a general entertainment independent television station based in Toronto (with repeaters in Southern and Eastern Ontario) that was branded as "Sun TV" before it began simulcasting Sun News from the network's launch until Quebecor surrendered the CKXT licence in the fall of 2011. The existence of Sun TV prior to Sun News (and the fact a similar on-screen logo was used for the CKXT venture) has resulted in Sun News sometimes being erroneously referred to as "Sun TV".

The network, known for its politicized editorial stance, was plagued with poor viewership: the network reported an average of 8,000 viewers, which was significantly lower than its competitors, CBC News Network and CTV News Channel. This lack of viewership has been attributed in part to failing to gain mandatory carriage, which their competitors enjoyed, by the CRTC. Following failed attempts to sell the network to ZoomerMedia (a company owned by Canadian television executive Moses Znaimer) and Leonard Asper, Sun News Network abruptly signed off on February 13, 2015 at 5:00 a.m. ET.

== History ==
=== Licensing ===
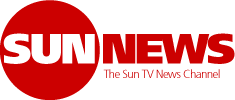
Original pre-launch logo for the channel while under its tentative name, Sun TV News Channel. The logo was used in 2010 during its licensing campaign and was never employed on-air.

From the start of its licensing attempts for Sun News, Quebecor intended for the network to replace the company's existing licence for general entertainment independent station CKXT-TV (branded as "Sun TV"), which was available at the time over-the-air in Toronto and through relayed through rebroadcasters in Hamilton, London and Ottawa. In its initial submission to the Canadian Radio-Television and Telecommunications Commission (CRTC) in the spring of 2010, Quebecor requested that Sun News be awarded a Category 1 digital specialty channel licence that would have reverted to Category 2 status after three years. The Category 1 status, if the CRTC had approved it, would have given Sun News the same status as CTV News Channel and CBC News Network, in that it would have required all Canadian digital television providers (both cable and direct broadcast satellite) to carry and offer Sun News to their customers should those carriers have the capability to do so. However, unlike CTV News Channel and CBC News Network, carriers would not have had the ability to distribute Sun News via analogue cable, only through their digital service (a Category 1 status would not have made the channel a compulsory part of every customer's basic digital package; however, it could be placed in digital basic packages subject to negotiations between Sun News and individual television providers).

Quebecor initially requested Category 1 status for Sun News on the basis that the channel's combination of news, analysis and opinion programming would create "a completely new [TV] genre" different from the other all-news channels in Canada. The CRTC disagreed, however, and turned down the application in a July 5, 2010 letter to Quebecor. In its letter, the CRTC noted that Sun News was being promoted in part as a news channel, and suggested that "news and analysis are sub-categories of the information programming category," which therefore would not, in the CRTC's eyes, make Sun News unique. Additionally, the CRTC had stated earlier in 2010 that it was not planning to entertain any new applications for Category 1 licences until at least October 2011. International activist organization Avaaz.org and other organizations filed petitions containing over 21,000 signatures to the CRTC to have the channel denied its Category 1 status application and its abolition under "breach of trust allegations" and "diminished news information integrity".

After the CRTC declined the Category 1 application, an online petition titled "Stop Fox News North" was established. The petition claimed that Prime Minister Stephen Harper sought to "push American-style hate media onto [Canadian] airwaves" with Sun News, and that the network would be "funded with money from our cable TV fees" (in contradiction to the "mandatory access" request in Quebecor's second CRTC application); the petition also cited Martin's column as evidence that CRTC chairman Konrad von Finckenstein was the "one man" standing in the way of Sun News getting a preferential licence. Author Margaret Atwood was among the petition signatories, revealing she signed it not as a criticism of Sun News' possible right-wing agenda but as a criticism of Harper's style of government, particularly perceived attempts by his government to expedite Sun News' licence approval.

Quebecor resubmitted its Sun News application under Category 2 status. Though Category 2 is not mandatory (cable and satellite carriers are not compelled to carry such channels), Quebecor included in its resubmission a request for a Category 1-style "mandatory access" period of no more than three years, insisting that the network would need that period of time "to effectively expose and promote its programming to viewers across Canada" without obliging cable and satellite customers to add it to their package; without mandatory access, Quebecor added, cable and satellite carriers could choose not to offer Sun News to their customers, which could lead to Quebecor pulling the plug on the project.

On October 5, 2010, Quebecor announced that it was withdrawing its mandatory access request and applied for a normal Category 2 status without any special exceptions or carriage conditions. The move was widely considered an easier avenue for Sun News' licence approval (Category 2 licences are routinely granted by the CRTC unless it is for a format considered a protected genre, of which national news channels are not included). The CRTC granted Quebecor a five-year Category 2 licence for Sun News on November 26, 2010; the network's status was changed to a Category C service on September 1, 2011, as part of an overall restructuring of broadcasting regulations during Canada's transition to digital television broadcasting.

=== Launch ===
After a planned launch on January 1, 2011, was pushed back because of start-up and staffing challenges, Sun News launched on April 18, 2011, with a ten-hour countdown clock that ended when regular programming began at 4:30 p.m. Eastern Time. O Canada was played before a half-hour launch preview special hosted by Canada Live journalist and host Krista Erickson (who served as the Sun newspapers' "Sunshine Girl" for the day). The special was followed by the premiere of The Source with Ezra Levant, and the remainder of the network's prime-time talk programming. Daytime news programs debuted the following day on April 19. Sun News was based in studios in Toronto, with additional studios located in Ottawa, Winnipeg, Vancouver and Calgary. Sun News also maintained news bureaus in Edmonton (shared with Sun Media), Montreal (shared with QMI Agency) and Washington, D.C., the only bureau it maintained outside of Canada.

=== Closure ===
Sun News Network struggled financially, losing $46.7 million over a three-year period, with a loss of $14.8 million in 2013 alone.

The channel was generally regarded as being symbiotic with Sun Media's newspapers through its shared editorial viewpoints and the network's use of Sun Media staff for some of its on-air content and reporting as well as through various Sun News Network hosts writing columns for the Sun chain. This relationship was expected to change as a result of Quebecor's proposed sale of Sun Media's English-language print properties and their related websites to Postmedia Network, a deal announced in October 2014 and awaiting regulatory approval and consummation. Though Sun News was not part of the deal, Postmedia said that it would license the Sun name and branding back to the network for one year, after which the network would have to adopt a new brand. Quebecor's divestment of Sun Media raised questions about Sun News Network's viability as a standalone operation under the Quebecor umbrella, as most of the company's remaining properties are entirely francophone, which could limit any synergy potential.

Further clouding Sun News' future was a December 2014 Globe and Mail report that ZoomerMedia was in talks to acquire the network. Some reports on the possible acquisition cite sources as saying that should the deal have taken place, the channel could have become a reboot of the unconventional news-and-lifestyle CityNews model utilized by CITY/Toronto and CP24 which were both founded by ZoomerMedia CEO, Moses Znaimer. The Canadaland website reported on January 26, 2015 that the negotiations with ZoomerMedia had stalled over the issue of severance packages for executives and that the channel faced imminent closure, "within as little as two months", if a deal with Znaimer was not reached. Reportedly, Quebecor Media made a final offer to Zoomer in February with a deadline of February 13, 2015 and Zoomer was "unwilling or unable to meet" its offer. An eleventh hour bid to buy Sun News was reportedly made by Leonard Asper, President/CEO of specialty channel operator Anthem Media Group and former CEO of Canwest; Quebecor, however, turned down an offer from Asper, who was unwilling to take on employment contracts and severance packages of Sun News' employees and executives.

Sun News Network ceased operations on February 13 at 5:00 a.m. EST, with news of the closure being broken hours before. There was neither an advance announcement by management, nor any on-air announcement by the channel. After its last program, a repeat of Byline with Brian Lilley, and following a promo for Pat Bolland's program, the channel aired a silent static card of the channel's logo for 30 seconds, then went to a black screen leaving cable operators to announce the closure themselves. A segment from Michael Coren's The Arena with Sun News contributor Rachael Segal was the last segment ever recorded (it aired a few hours later) while David Akin's Battleground was the last live broadcast on the Sun News Network. The closure meant the loss of 150 full-time jobs and affected an additional 50 freelancers and contributors. Management released a statement following the closure: "This is an unfortunate outcome; shutting down Sun News was certainly not our goal", according to Julie Tremblay, President and CEO of Quebecor's Media Group division and Sun Media Corporation. "Over the past four years, we tried everything we could to achieve sufficient market penetration to generate the profits needed to operate a national news channel. Sadly, the numerous obstacles to carriage that we encountered spelled the end of this venture ... We thank all employees for their daily efforts and the talent they have contributed to the channel. We wish them all the best in their future endeavours," she concluded.

The operating licence for Sun News Network was surrendered to the CRTC on March 4, 2015.

== Carriage ==
As of November 2013, Sun News Network was available in approximately 40% of Canadian homes. Since obtaining the Sun News licence in late 2010, Quebecor negotiated carriage deals with cable and satellite providers on an individual basis. Quebecor-owned Vidéotron carried the network, as did systems run by Access Communications, Bell Canada, Rogers Cable, Eastlink, Sasktel, Shaw Communications and Cogeco (the initial deal with Shaw was for a free, six-month trial period on Shaw Cable systems in Ontario and Western Canada; Cogeco's clearance of Sun News is limited to the provider's Ontario systems).

Sun News was also initially available over-the-air on Quebecor's Toronto-based CKXT-TV, which served Southern and Eastern Ontario, which had maintained a general entertainment format under the "Sun TV" brand until began simulcasting Sun News upon the network's launch. This simulcast allowed Sun News to reach audiences in the Toronto, Ottawa, Hamilton and London areas (the latter three cities through repeaters), either through the CKXT broadcast signal or cable and satellite services that were compelled to carry CKXT's signal. Some carriers outside those areas also carried CKXT at their own discretion. Though Quebecor had intended to return the CKXT licence in exchange for Sun News, it made a February 2011 filing to the CRTC requesting to continue CKXT's operations past the August 2011 digital conversion. The arrangement led to complaints by other broadcasters, and cable and satellite providers that Sun was trying to "have it both ways" by having both guaranteed over-the-air coverage while asking for the subscriber fees to which a specialty channel is entitled. On July 5, 2011, the CRTC told Quebecor it would have to justify its practice of using an over-the-air signal to rebroadcast a specialty channel; Quebecor responded on July 15 that it would agree to surrender the CKXT licence to the CRTC. As a result, Sun News' CKXT simulcast ended on November 1, 2011, when the main Toronto signal was turned off along with the Hamilton and London repeaters (the Ottawa repeater was shut off on August 31).

Bell Satellite TV carried Sun News from its launch until the morning of May 3, 2011, when the channel was removed from the service at Quebecor's request because no carriage fee agreement had been reached with Bell TV. Bell countered that Quebecor's asking price for carriage of Sun News was in line with more popular channels and deemed too high for such a "new and relatively untested" channel; additionally, Bell wanted to treat Sun News as a terrestrial channel (in other words, making it available without carriage fees), citing its then-simulcast on CKXT. (The outage did not affect Bell Fibe TV in the Toronto area, which was compelled to carry CKXT's signal). Quebecor filed a complaint with the CRTC over the incident, alleging that Bell was discriminating against Sun News and thereby favouring Bell Media's own news networks, namely CTV News Channel and CP24. On November 22, 2011, Quebecor and Bell announced a deal that would add Sun News to Bell TV's basic satellite and IPTV packages outside of Quebec (a deal for subscribers in that province was expected to be announced later). The Bell deal also included carriage of three other Quebecor-owned networks, Mlle, Yoopa and TVA Sports.

=== 2013 mandatory carriage attempt ===
In January 2013, Quebecor again filed a request with the CRTC for mandatory carriage for Sun News Network, requesting that the channel become a compulsory part of the basic channel tiers (analogue and digital) of cable and satellite providers. In a response to interventions submitted to the CRTC in March 2013, and in CRTC public hearings conducted one month later, executives of Quebecor claimed that Sun News (one of several new and existing channels making carriage proposals during those hearings) was not receiving fair treatment from cable and satellite providers who were giving their own news channels preferential treatment ahead of Sun. As a remedy, Quebecor requested that Sun News receive a mandatory placement on basic channel tiers through the end of 2017, with a per-subscriber fee of $0.18/month ($0.09/month in primarily French-speaking markets). Quebecor claimed that the proposal was similar to what CBC News Network and CTV News Channel previously enjoyed, and if approved, would help Sun News build viewership levels and audience and advertiser awareness, as well as help alleviate the financial losses the channel accrued (Sun News posted a pre-tax loss of $18.5 million for 2012). Quebecor went all in on the carriage attempt, drumming up viewer support through a social media campaign ("Canadian TV First"), and stating to the CRTC that anything short of mandatory carriage would be the equivalent of a "death sentence" for Sun News, including a suggested "must carry" status (where providers had to offer the channel to subscribers, who could decide on their own whether to add the channel to their package).

Sun News and eleven other applicants saw their mandatory carriage requests denied in a decision released by the CRTC on August 8, 2013 (several other channels saw their mandatory requests either granted or renewed in that same decision). In specifically denying Sun News' request, the CRTC stated that Sun did not clearly demonstrate that it met the high bar for mandatory carriage, noting that Sun did not show its unique status among Category C news channels, nor did it effectively demonstrate exceptional commitments to first-run programming expenditures; additionally, the Commission believed that Sun knew and accepted the financial risks of originally launching without guaranteed carriage and subsidies.

The CRTC's decision came at a time when it showed concern about the affordability of cable and satellite services, worrying that while a mandatory basic tier presence would help Sun and its fellow applicants fulfill their respective mandates, the added rates the channels would have received would unduly inconvenience customers.

Though Sun News expressed disappointment at the denial of its mandatory carriage request, the network believed their campaign served as a "catalyst" for what the CRTC included in its decision: addressing the broader issue of rules governing distribution of Category C national news channels, the Commission acknowledged that those rules may serve as "barriers" that would prevent the channels from having a "pride of place" on the broadcast system and reduce their "exchange of ideas on matters of public concern." With that, the CRTC launched a rules review process, proposing new guidelines that would require distributors to offer all national news channels to their customers, as well as how the channels should be packaged and priced, their proximity on channel lineups, and how carriage disputes should be handled by the CRTC. The review resulted in new rules issued by the CRTC on December 19, 2013: by March 19, 2014, Canadian television providers were required to offer all Category C national news channels to their subscribers (but not necessarily on the lowest tier of service); by May 18, 2014, all Category C news channels that were not already offered on the lowest level of service had to be included in "the best available discretionary package consistent with their genre and programming", or offered to subscribers on a standalone basis. CRTC chairman Jean-Pierre Blais stated that the changes were to ensure that Canadians "have access to the news services that are of interest to them and will therefore have an opportunity to be exposed to a variety of opinions on matters of public concern." Though the ruling did not assure Sun News the favourable channel placement or the per-subscriber fee it had previously sought, the new rules were seen by network executives as "good news" and by one financial analyst as "incrementally positive" for the struggling network.

== Programming and content ==
At the outset, Sun News featured a daily schedule modelled after Quebecor's French language news channel, Le Canal Nouvelles, with content that its executives promoted as "hard news by day, straight talk by night". During the daytime hours (from 6:00 a.m. to 5:00 p.m. Eastern Time), its programming placed an emphasis on news reporting and breaking news coverage; during the evening hours (from 5:00 p.m. onwards Eastern Time), the emphasis shifted to personality-driven analysis and commentary programmes. In November 2013, Sun began revamping its programming, expanding the amount of its analysis and opinion content and seeking to reduce repetitive straight news coverage in order to further differentiate it from its well-established rivals CBC News Network and CTV News Channel.

Sun News' general on-air attitude, its founding executives claimed, was lively, "unapologetically patriotic", and "less politically correct" in comparison to CTV News Channel and CBC News Network, which Quebecor management claimed were "uninspiring" and leading Canadian television viewers to turn to U.S. networks for news. Sun News also took a conservative-leaning approach that mirrored the namesake Sun chain of Quebecor-owned English-language tabloid newspapers. Sun News' rightward lean and its employment of conservative commentators and operatives in key on-air and off-air positions, led to comparisons to the United States-based Fox News Channel ("Fox News North" was an early colloquial term applied to the network in media reports, punditry, and criticisms). Sun News management openly bristled at the comparisons to Fox News, saying that they only intended Sun News to mimic the Sun chain's "irreverent" and "provocative" approach, and that though some conservative voices would be prominent, a "range of [political] opinion" would be offered.

== Controversy and criticism ==
=== Criticism by former staff ===
Writing several years after leaving Sun News, former senior anchor Theo Caldwell wrote of the station's output that "the finished product was lousy television, even by Canadian standards." He also complained that he was not being paid, despite his contract, and finally quit as a result. Caldwell described management's view on mandatory carriage as "hypocritical". "At first, when they imagined the station would be a blockbuster success, they mocked the very idea of mandatory carriage. When it became clear, however, that no amount of Suzuki-bashing and Justin Trudeau prizefights could save the enterprise, they insisted it was unfair not to grant Sun a guaranteed income stream, on the risible basis that CBC and CTV had received similar treatment decades before. It wasn't honest, and it is astounding that Peladeau and Sun management could undertake such a blatant reversal without a trace of irony."

On the reason for the channel's failure, Caldwell wrote: "Simply put, if Sun were good, people would have watched it. The channel was available in 5 million homes, yet garnered only a few thousand viewers... The simple truth is that Sun News was mind-bendingly bad television, and only a dysfunctional crew led by the likes of Peladeau could have thought it would catch on."

Former anchor Krista Erickson wrote an article for National Newswatch in 2015 that singled out former Quebecor vice-president Kory Teneycke, who was in charge of the channel, for criticism calling him a "controlling authoritarian" whose pro-Conservative Party "partisanship often went into overdrive" at the channel's expense. Erickson blamed Teneycke for the channel reporting during the 2011 federal election of a 16-year-old incident involving Jack Layton being allegedly found in a massage parlour by police. "There was no arrest, no criminal charge, therefore no criminal behaviour. On these facts, the justification of public interest was arguably thin," according to Erickson, who claimed Sun News Network management nevertheless coached its on-air staff to treat the story as if it was "a major sex scandal involving the NDP leader." Erickson also claimed that during the 2012 Alberta provincial election campaign, Teneycke "instructed me to stop reporting on the homophobic gaffes of [conservative] Wildrose candidates" and that Teneycke "also demanded a segment discussing the Wildrose leader's record on abortion be removed from my program lineup".

Erickson also claimed that, had the CRTC approved the channel's application for a mandatory carriage license, Teneycke planned to fire up to 50% of Sun News Network staff, whom he suspected of being Liberal sympathizers or otherwise politically out of step with Teneycke's views, and replace them with former Conservative Party staffers. Erickson also claimed that Sun News contributor Michael Taube stopped being asked to appear on the channel after he expressed disagreement with the Harper government's proposals to allow income splitting.

=== 2010 licensing campaign ===
In his August 19, 2010 column in The Globe and Mail, Lawrence Martin claimed, citing "insiders", that CRTC chair Konrad von Finckenstein was under pressure from Prime Minister Stephen Harper to resign from the commission and take another government position, such as an ambassadorship, in order to facilitate Sun News getting its desired licence. In a letter to The Globe and Mail, von Finckenstein "categorically" denied any government interference regarding Sun News or his tenure as CRTC chair.

=== Early content and programming ===
Before Quebecor withdrew its mandatory access request for Sun News (see above), the public interest group Friends of Canadian Broadcasting issued a briefing to the CRTC recommending that Sun News' application be rejected, believing that Sun's mandatory access request was "highly unfair" to other licence applicants. However, Friends recommended that if Sun News did win licence approval, Quebecor should be required to commit revenue to Canadian programming (equal to that of CTV News Channel and CBC News Network) as well as adhere to the Canadian Association of Broadcasters Code of Ethics for balanced news coverage and programming. The CRTC's November 26 approval specifically included requirements that Sun News would adhere to the RTNDA Code of Journalistic Ethics and the Journalistic Independence Code as a member of the Canadian Broadcast Standards Council. Sun News was regarded to be a possible benefactor of a proposal by the CRTC to give licensed broadcast stations more leeway to broadcast false and misleading news (the CRTC dropped the proposal in February 2011).

The content of Sun News' early hours and days received some criticism and generated some controversy, with critics and columnists remarking about the network's heavy self-promotion and choice of opening night topics, including several critiques against the CBC (see also below) and little talk about the ongoing political campaign (by coincidence, Sun News' debut occurred two weeks before a federal election). Ezra Levant was panned as well for relying on "old news" during the first edition of The Source, including showing a controversial 2005 cartoon depicting Muhammad. Less kind criticisms came from The Globe and Mail TV critic John Doyle, who branded Sun News as "fantastically inept broadcasting", and from Winnipeg Free Press columnist Brad Oswald, who remarked that the network "lacked the ideological zeal and the financial wherewithal to achieve its self-stated goal of changing TV history."

Sun News' perceived sex appeal received attention early on, with both Rick Mercer and Ottawa Citizen columnist Dave Dutton among those tweeting about the "babe shots" during Sun's first day. Later in the week, columnist Tasha Kheiriddin of the National Post slammed Sun News over the "low cut, sleeveless" attire of the network's female anchors; Maclean's Washington bureau chief Luiza Ch. Savage, in agreement with Kheiriddin, billed the network as "Skank TV" on her Twitter feed (a comment she would later delete). Sun News management defended their anchors' "right to bare arms," as did New Democratic Party (NDP) Member of Parliament Olivia Chow – who unveiled a sleeveless look during an April 21 appearance on The Roundtable, stating that "It's not what [women in politics] wear that matters, it's the ideas they bring forward."

=== 2011 federal election reportage ===
Sun Media, and Sun News in particular, was involved in two separate news stories during the final week of the 2011 federal election that centred on two of the federal party leaders. The first centred on a photo that appeared to show Liberal Party leader Michael Ignatieff posing with U.S. military forces in Kuwait in late 2002, months before the 2003 invasion of Iraq. The source of the photo was Conservative Party operative Patrick Muttart, who had been providing pro bono advice to Sun News regarding its on-air presentation and offered the photo to Sun Media, which ran a story alleging Ignatieff's involvement with the U.S. plans to invade Iraq. Sun Media did not run the photo, however, as the image was illegible and did not conclusively prove of Ignatieff's presence with the U.S. troops. Sun Media head Pierre Karl Péladeau, in an editorial for the Sun papers, claimed the photo was an attempt to not only damage the Ignatieff campaign but the integrity of Sun Media and Sun News as well. The incident led to Muttart's removal from the campaign of Conservative leader and incumbent Prime Minister Stephen Harper.

On April 29, 2011, Sun News ran a report contending that NDP leader Jack Layton was in attendance at a Toronto massage clinic when police visited it in 1996 on suspicion of it being a brothel. Layton, who was never charged with any wrongdoing, called Sun News's report a "smear campaign," while Layton's lawyer, Brian Iler, said in a statement that Layton "had no knowledge whatsoever that the therapist's location may have been used for illicit purposes." Layton's wife and fellow NDP Member of Parliament Olivia Chow confirmed the 1996 appointment and decried "any insinuation of wrongdoing" on her husband's part. Ontario Provincial Police launched a probe into how police notes about the incident were leaked to Sun News, whose report cited an anonymous Toronto vice-squad officer.

=== Conflict with, and criticism toward, the CBC ===
Sun News Network (and, historically in print, Sun Media) carried frequent and ongoing criticism of the Canadian Broadcasting Corporation, and accused the Crown-owned public broadcaster (which Sun Media pejoratively termed "The State Broadcaster") of having a left-wing bias and misusing taxpayer funds. The channel and Quebecor's newspaper chain filed hundreds of Access to Information requests seeking details of how CBC was spending its $1.1 billion budget. CBC's refusal to fill many of those Access to Information requests led to a court case filed against it by Canada's Information Commissioner. Sun News frequently aired news pieces and published articles alleging misspending of taxpayer dollars. CBC president Hubert Lacroix called the attacks a "smear campaign." Sun Media CEO Pierre-Karl Péladeau accused the CBC of advertising with almost all media companies but his.

During the 2014 Winter Olympics, Byline host Brian Lilley aired a segment which criticized CBC personalities for pronouncing the names of Olympic competitors from Quebec in the French manner rather than anglicizing them. Canadian English does not have a single standard for handling non-English names; some speakers anglicize them while others try to follow the native pronunciation as closely as possible, but neither practice is considered to be objectively incorrect, and many international news organizations throughout the world follow the latter practice as a matter of respect to the personalities they cover. Lilley apologized for the segment the following day.

=== CBSC rulings ===
Sun News Network, as a compulsory condition of its broadcast licence, held membership in the Canadian Broadcast Standards Council (CBSC), and had to adhere to the CBSC's member-written Code of Ethics. A violation of the Code occurred on December 22, 2011, when Ezra Levant, in a commentary on The Source, blasted Chiquita Brands International and its ethical record after the company stated it would discontinue using oil produced from the Alberta oil sands. Speaking in Spanish, Levant told a Hispanic Chiquita executive to go have sexual relations with his mother. The CBSC received 22 complaints about Levant's use of the slur, a few noting that it is one of the nastiest insults in the Spanish language. Though Sun News and Levant went on to argue that the phrase can have several meanings, Levant later admitted he intended to use the term in its literal, most vulgar sense. With that, the CBSC determined in June 2012 that, though Levant had his right to criticize Chiquita and its management, his use of the Spanish vulgarity violated Clause 6 of the Code of Ethics, which requires "full, fair and proper presentation of news, opinion, comment and editorial" content; as a result, Sun News was required to issue an on-air announcement of the CBSC decision.

An earlier incident that gained much more attention and complaints, but which had a different outcome, occurred during a June 1, 2011 broadcast of Canada Live, when Krista Erickson discussed public funding for arts programmes with interpretive dancer Margie Gillis. During the discussion, Erickson took an aggressive verbal tone towards a soft-spoken Gillis, shouting over Gillis's responses and challenging her comments about lack of compassion amongst Canadians when, to quote Erickson, "We have lost more than 150 soldiers who have served in Afghanistan!" Though Sun News stood by Erickson and her conduct in the Gillis interview, the CBSC would receive 6,676 complaints from viewers over the incident, considerably more than twice the annual average number of complaints the Council received. After reviewing the complaints, the CBSC determined in February 2012 that no violation of Clause 6 of the Code of Ethics occurred, stating that Erickson's line of questioning, though forceful, did not cross into personal attacks.

Another incident that occurred on The Source (separate from the Chiquita incident mentioned above) involved the July 4, 2011 broadcast, when Ezra Levant and journalist/blogger Kathryn Marshall discussed a municipal- and provincial-government-funded program in Edmonton that would provide housing and studio space for Edmonton artists; during the discussion, Levant frequently (and Marshall occasionally) called the program "free housing" for artists. On the July 6 Source, Levant retracted the "free housing" comments after reading a viewer comment that faulted him for not verifying his claims (residents of the project did pay rent), though he stood by his objections to government funding for the project. The CBSC, after receiving 40 complaints on the incident, sided with Levant and Sun News in determining that no violation of Code of Ethics Clauses 6 and 7 (the latter clause concerned fair treatment on controversial issues) had occurred.

==== "Gypsy" comments ====
On September 5, 2012, Sun News Network host Ezra Levant broadcast a commentary "The Jew vs. the Gypsies" on The Source, in which he accused the Romani people as a group of being criminals and said: "These are gypsies, a culture synonymous with swindlers. The phrase gypsy and cheater have been so interchangeable historically that the word has entered the English language as a verb: he gypped me. Gypsies are not a race. They're a shiftless group of hobos. They rob people blind. Their chief economy is theft and begging. For centuries these roving highway gangs have mocked the law and robbed their way across Europe."

Following complaints, the Sun News Network removed the video from its website and issued an apology: "Two weeks ago on the Sun News program "The Source" we looked at the issue of Canadian refugee claims by the Roma people. Following the broadcast we received a number of complaints from viewers who felt the broadcast reinforced negative stereotypes about the Roma people. We have completed a review of the material and we agree that this content was inappropriate and should not have gone to air. It was not the intent of Sun News, or anyone employed by Sun News, to promote negative stereotypes about the Roma people. We regret our error in these broadcasts, and we apologize unreservedly to the Roma people and to you, our viewers."

Bernie Farber, former CEO of the Canadian Jewish Congress, Holocaust survivor Nate Leipciger and Avrum Rosensweig of Ve’ahavta: The Canadian Jewish Humanitarian and Relief Committee published an op-ed in the National Post which condemned Levant's commentary as a "contemptible screed" and argued that "[t]he time has come for all of us to reject hate and bigotry – against any group".

Gina Csanyi-Robah, executive director of the Roma Community Centre in Toronto, described the broadcast as "nearly nine minutes of on-air racist hate-speech targeting our community", "one of the longest and most sustained on-air broadcasts of hate-speech against any community in Canada that we've witnessed since our organization was established in 1997" and as "overtly racist, prejudicial, and demeaning." The centre filed complaints against Sun News with the Canadian Radio-television and Telecommunications Commission and the Canadian Broadcast Standards Council, and against Levant with the Alberta Law Society as well as with the Toronto Police Service.

In March 2013, Levant apologized for his remarks stating his rant "will serve as an example of what not to do when commenting on social issues". It was subsequently reported that the police and crown attorney had recommended hate charges be laid against Levant but the Attorney-General of Ontario's office declined to lay charges because of fears that the trial would become a "bit of a [media] circus".

The Canadian Broadcast Standards Council subsequently ruled, in September 2013, that Levant's broadcast was "in violation of the Canadian Association of Broadcasters' Code of Ethics and Equitable Portrayal Code," and that his comments about the Roma were "abusive and unduly discriminatory against an ethnic group, and violated other provisions of the [code] regarding negative portrayal, stereotyping, stigmatization and degradation."

On January 23, 2013, Levant showed video of a protest that had occurred in front of the Sun News office in Toronto in which protesters objected to the Sun's coverage of the Idle No More movement. Levant replayed the clip on a subsequent broadcast and proceeded to identify one couple by name claiming that they were "professional protesters." The couple subsequently contacted Sun to complain that it was not them in the clip, that they had not attended the protest nor even been in Toronto at the time. "The CBSC's National Specialty Services Panel concluded that Sun News Network breached Clause 6 of the CAB Code of Ethics for including inaccurate information in the talk show. Levant had acknowledged his error on the February 8 episode of The Source."

=== 2011 Citizenship Week incident ===
On October 18, 2011, The Roundtable held a ceremony at Sun News' Toronto studios to commemorate Canada's celebration of Citizenship Week. Sun News producers, rather than sending a crew to one of several citizenship ceremonies in the Toronto area (as Citizenship and Immigration Canada (CIC) officials had initially recommended), offered instead to have 10 new Canadian citizens take the Oath of Citizenship at its studios (suggesting that the network only wanted to cover the oath, rather than a full ceremony, on-air). The CIC Toronto office scrambled to arrange for 10 recently sworn citizens to reaffirm the oath on Sun News at the network's request, and the oath ceremony went ahead as planned on October 18, with Roundtable anchors Alex Pierson and Pat Bolland presenting the group as if to suggest that they were taking the oath for the first time (though the presiding judge made it clear during the broadcast that this was only a reaffirmation of the oath). However, in a February 2, 2012 Canadian Press report, which relied on documents and e-mails released under the Access to Information Act, about six of the 10 who reaffirmed the oath were in fact CIC employees, who were there to fill in for those new citizens who had to back out due to other commitments and to ensure "the right numbers" for the Sun News broadcast. (The names of CIC and Sun News employees on the e-mails, which were redacted in the CP report, were revealed in later reports by other outlets).

CIC was criticised for its role in the incident, while opposition members in the House of Commons of Canada laid blame on Immigration Minister Jason Kenney for the "deceptive" reaffirmation ceremony (an e-mail revealed in the CP report as coming from a SunMedia.ca address appeared to suggest that Sun News offered to "fake the oath" on-air). Kenney and his office, after the CP's February 2 report, insisted they were not made aware of CIC Toronto's actions in the event until the day before the CP report was released, blaming CIC Toronto officials for their "poor [handling]" and "logistical problems". Kenney's press secretary, Candice Malcolm, went so far as to offer a mea culpa to Sun News in a February 3 appearance on The Roundtable.

Pat Bolland, in his February 3 interview with Candice Malcolm, acknowledged that both Sun News and the government "had a little bit of egg on our face [sic]," but both he and fellow Roundtable host Alex Pierson asserted they were personally not privy to CIC's actions or the actual citizenship status of the participants when they presented the event to viewers. Sun News management would claim no advance knowledge as well, with spokesperson Luc Lavoie stating that "our viewers were deceived by a well-meaning [CIC] bureaucrat who made a poor decision", and cited, by name, a Sun News producer (who left the network a month after the event) for her role in the incident. However, the explanations of both Kenney's office and Sun News were called into question in June 2012, when a new Canadian Press report revealed that they both were in fact privy to the presence of the civil servants on the Roundtable broadcast, and that Sun was "given the choice" to use them on-air. Kenney, in response to the new CP report, backtracked on his earlier blame of CIC bureaucrats, claiming in the House of Commons that "at every citizenship ceremony Canadians are invited to reaffirm, including public servants", and that the Sun News incident "was perfectly normal and legitimate".

Sun News was criticised for the incident: Toronto Star columnist Heather Mallick, after the original CP report, called the broadcast a "charade" that "mocked our democracy [and] journalism", while a Star editorial stated that Sun failed its viewers for "misrepresenting a reaffirmation ceremony as a citizenship one". Sun News had its defenders, however: Sun host Krista Erickson defended her colleagues' role, branding the original CP story as "extremely misleading" and a "completely unfair attack". CTV News Channel host Don Martin also said that Sun was not to blame, other than "not having the resources to attend a real ceremony". The February 2 CP report noted that CIC Toronto officials had lingering doubts about the broadcast, and one official recommended afterwards that Sun News, should the network desire to do so, present a full citizenship ceremony (not a reaffirmation) in the future, either in its studios or at a scheduled CIC ceremony.

=== Justin Trudeau photo ===
During a September 15, 2014 edition of The Source, Ezra Levant featured a photo of then-Liberal leader Justin Trudeau, taken and tweeted by Trudeau's official photographer, posing with a bridal party and giving the bride a kiss on the cheek. In comments criticising Trudeau and the media's general coverage of him, Levant used the photo to claim that Trudeau "pushed himself into the picture in an intimate way" on an occasion where, Levant contended, the bride should be kissed by only her father and the groom. Levant went further, drawing a line from Trudeau's actions to the promiscuity of Trudeau's parents, former Prime Minister Pierre Trudeau (whom Levant termed "a slut") and Margaret Trudeau. Levant's comments drew criticism from Trudeau's office on September 23, stating Sun Media "crossed the line... of editorial integrity" in airing a "personal attack on the Trudeau family." (The bride in the photo and her father-in-law would publicly state that Trudeau was given permission to pose in the photo and to kiss the bride.) In a show of displeasure towards Sun Media, Trudeau's office announced that he would "continue to not engage" with Sun's print, broadcast, and online outlets until Quebecor "resolves the matter." Sun Media would offer an apology before the September 29 broadcast of The Source, with an announcer stating that the segment was in poor taste and expressing apologies to Trudeau, his family, and viewers, although Levant did not apologize personally. Trudeau's office, in turn, offered an acceptance of the apology.

== Ratings and viewership ==
Ratings for Sun News were consistently poor, especially amongst the 25-54 year-old market most desirable to advertisers; at least one prime-time Sun News show once drew a zero rating in the 25-54 demographic.

On Sun News's first night of programming on April 18, 2011, 37,000 viewers nationwide tuned into the half-hour preview show, with 31,000 viewers staying to watch the first regular program, The Source with Ezra Levant; other first-day viewership levels included 31,000 for Charles Adler and 17,000 for Byline with Brian Lilley. After that first night, however, first-week viewership fell considerably, with the network attracting 12,000 viewers on April 20, only 1,000 of them within the advertiser-desired 25-54 age demographic. Viewership numbers did not improve going forward that week; on April 22 at 7:00 p.m. Eastern Time, 11,000 viewers watched Sun News, well behind CBC News Network's number for that hour (263,000) and even behind U.S. import CNN (38,000).

By June 2011, Sun News reached an average of 12,900 viewers, which ranked it ahead of all-business specialty channel BNN but well behind both CBC News Network and CTV News Channel.

In August 2011, Quebecor Media Inc. stated that on August 12, Sun News had higher viewership than CTV News Channel during the period from 3:00 to 10:00 p.m. Eastern Time and higher than CBC News Network in the 3:00 to 5:00 p.m. period. The channel also had its highest ever viewership of 89,000 for the 9:00 p.m. Eastern Time telecast of Byline. The following Thursday August 18, Sun News Network had higher viewership than CTV News Channel from 1:00 p.m.–10:00 p.m. with Charles Adler receiving 62,000 viewers and Byline garnering 80,000 viewers. However, on the next day, the numbers dropped to 30,000 for Adler and 19,000 for Byline. On December 28, the highest rated show was The Source with Ezra Levant, garnering an audience of 38,000 viewers. Byline with Brian Lilley pulled 35,000 viewers. However, only 5,000 and 6,000 of those viewers respectively were from the coveted 25-54 age demographic. Charles Adler only drew 8,000 viewers at 8:00 p.m. with zero in the 25-54 age bracket.

On April 18, 2012, one year after Sun News' launch, a BBM Canada ratings report revealed that during a 24-hour period from 2:00 a.m. the current day to 2:00 a.m. Eastern Time the next day between August 31, 2011 and March 31, 2012, Sun News came in fourth place among English language news channels in Canada, bringing in only 0.1% of viewers, a fraction of the rating for CBC News Network (1.4%), CNN (0.9%) and the CTV News Channel (0.8%). Requests for Sun News to comment or elaborate on the ratings were declined.

According to documents filed by Sun News Network with the CRTC in January 2013, the channel had a viewership of 16,400 in an average minute. Other sources reported that number as being far lower, with the CBC reporting that in 2013 Sun News was only attracting, on average, 8,000 viewers at any given time.

== Staff ==
An image of Sun News Network's Krista Erickson appeared on the 4/18/2011 front page of the Toronto Sun to herald that day's launch of Sun News Network. The Sun newspapers served as both a promotional tool and content source for the network.

Sun News was headed by Kory Teneycke, vice president of development for Quebecor and a former director of communications and chief spokesperson for Prime Minister Stephen Harper. Teneycke briefly left Sun News after a firestorm erupted over his criticism of Sun News' critics (see 2010 licensing campaign above); during that interim (September 2010 to January 2011), Sun News was headed by Luc Lavoie, a long-time Quebecor executive and, like Teneycke, a former Prime Minister's spokesperson (he served under Brian Mulroney).

At its June 2010 launch announcement, Sun News respectively named David Akin and Brian Lilley as national bureau chief and senior correspondent; both men served as on-air hosts. Sun News's first significant on-air hire was nationally syndicated talk show host Charles Adler; the Winnipeg-based Adler was named in September 2010 to host a nightly analysis/opinion show on the network (Adler's titular show was cancelled in September 2013, following the host's on-air chat with Kory Teneycke). Two more significant hires took place in October 2010, when Sun News hired longtime CBC News reporter Krista Erickson to serve as host and reporter, while also hiring author, columnist and Western Standard founder Ezra Levant to host a late-afternoon analysis show. During the summer of 2010, Sun News made an overture to comedian Rick Mercer (who declined), while also denying rumours of an offer to Kevin Newman, who left his anchor position at Global National that August and is currently a host for CTV News Channel. Theo Caldwell was also tapped to host a business-oriented afternoon show, but was quickly dropped in the summer of 2011 and replaced by Michael Coren.

Sun News hired Toronto mayor Rob Ford and his brother, Toronto city councillor Doug Ford, to host a weekly opinion show on the network, Ford Nation in November 2013. The Ford brothers previously hosted a Sunday afternoon call-in show on Toronto radio station CFRB, and their hire by Sun came at a period of turmoil for Rob Ford, who had been facing allegations concerning his conduct in office. Ford Nation, despite garnering respectable viewership for the network, was cancelled after only one airing, on November 18, reportedly due to the cost of taping and editing the programme as well as the Fords' inexperience with the television medium.

=== Use of Sun Media print staff ===
In addition to the on-air staff listed below, as well as an international content agreement with CNN, Sun News relied in part on staff and resources from the Sun chain and other Quebecor-owned newspapers; a number of Quebecor's print journalists were trained on the TV newsgathering tasks they perform in addition to their regular newspaper and website duties (the Sun News logo, in fact, was patterned after the Toronto Sun's long-time circular insignia, which was re-applied to all Sun tabloids and websites a day after Sun News' debut).

=== On-air staff (at shutdown) ===
==== Anchors and hosts ====
- Jerry Agar – host of Straight Talk (3:00 to 5:00 p.m. Eastern Time); also radio host for CFRB (1010 AM) in Toronto
- David Akin – national bureau chief for Sun Media and host of Battleground
- Adrienne Batra – host of Straight Talk (1:00 to 3:00 p.m. Eastern Time); former "Comment" editor for the Toronto Sun
- Michael Coren – host of The Arena; also Sun Media columnist
- Ezra Levant – host of The Source; also Sun Media columnist
- Brian Lilley – host of Byline and senior correspondent; also Sun Media columnist
- Alex Pierson – Toronto-based anchor of the first edition of Straight Talk (formerly co-host of AM Agenda and The Roundtable)

Reporters

- Alex Mihailovich - foreign affairs expert and news anchor
- Faith Goldy

==== Commentators, pundits, and contributors ====
- Eric Allen Bell – critic of Islam
- Andrew G. Bostom – author and editor, critic of Islam; pundit for The Arena
- Ann Coulter – American conservative lawyer, author, columnist and commentator
- Steven Crowder – Montreal-born Texas-based American conservative commentator and activist, critic of Islam, Fox News contributor; pundit for The Arena
- Éric Duhaime – QMI Agency columnist; pundit on Quebec politics
- Steven Emerson – critic of Islam, commentator on Islamic terrorism, creator of the documentary Jihad in America; pundit for The Arena
- Nadeem Esmail – health policy researcher at the Fraser Institute; analyst and contributor on the Canadian health care system
- Tarek Fatah – Pakistan-born founder of the Muslim Canadian Congress; author, QMI Agency columnist, CFRB radio host, commentator and critic of Islamism, Deobandi movements, Wahhabism, Salafism, the Muslim Brotherhood, and Islamic terrorism; pundit for The Arena and The Source
- Humberto Fontova – Cuban-born American anti-communist author, blogger, commentator and critic of Ché Guevara, the Castro brothers and their supporters; pundit for Byline and The Source
- Glen Foster – comedian, ThatCanadianGuy.com moderator; pundit for Byline
- Brigitte Gabriel – Christian Lebanese American political commentator on the Middle East, opponent of Islam; pundit for The Arena
- Pamela Geller – lawyer, pro-Israel activist, blogger, and commentator; opponent of Islam, critic of liberalism in the United States, the U.S. Democratic Party & President Barack Obama; pundit for The Arena and The Source
- Adam Giambrone – former Toronto city councilor, current federal and Ontario New Democrat party activist; pundit on Canadian, Ontarian and Toronto civic politics
- David Harris – lawyer, former officer in the Canadian Security Intelligence Service, commentator and expert on Islamic terrorism; pundit for The Source and Byline
- Ray Heard – former VP for News & Current Affairs at Global Television Network, former communications director for then Liberal leader John Turner. Pundit for Battleground
- David Horowitz – former New Left activist, current American conservative activist, blogger, author and commentator; opponent of Islam; critic of socialism and liberalism in the United States, the U.S. Democratic Party, and the American academe; pundit for The Arena and The Source
- Raymond Ibrahim – American of Egyptian Coptic descent; researcher of Arab history, translator, writer, and commentator; critic of Islam
- Warren Kinsella – former Ontario and federal Liberal Party activist, former aide to Jean Chrétien and campaign advisor to Dalton McGuinty; author, political consultant and QMI Agency columnist
- Andrew Lawton – blogger, commentator and activist; pundit for The Arena and The Source
- Patrick Moore – early member of Greenpeace, former Canadian Left & New Left environmental activist; current critic of the global environmental movement; pundit for The Source
- Daniel Pipes – academic historian, writer, and editor of Middle East Quarterly, critic of Wahhabism, Salafism and the Muslim Brotherhood; pundit for The Arena
- Raheel Raza – Pakistan-born Canadian journalist, author, interfaith discussion leader, and founding member of the Muslim Canadian Congress; critic of Islamism, Deobandi movements, Wahhabism, Salafism, & Islamic terrorism; pundit for The Arena and The Source
- Kathy Shaidle – Canadian conservative activist, blogger, writer and commentator; opponent of Islam; critic of the Canadian Human Rights Commission and multiculturalism in Canada; pundit for The Source and The Arena
- Ben Shapiro – American conservative lawyer, author, commentator, and activist; editor-at-large at Breitbart; critic of socialism and liberalism in the United States, American popular culture, the American academe, the U.S. Democratic Party, Presidents Bill Clinton and Barack Obama
- Debbie Schlussel – lawyer, author, blogger; critic of Islam, the U.S. Democratic Party and President Barack Obama
- Walid Shoebat – Arab American convert to Evangelical Christianity; commentator on Islamic terrorism, critic of Islam
- Monte Solberg – former Reform, Canadian Alliance, and Conservative Member of Parliament and Cabinet minister; current Sun Media columnist and pundit on Canadian and American politics
- Mark Steyn - author and columnist for Maclean's
- David Yerushalmi – critic of Islam, founder of anti-sharia draft bills on several American states
- J.J. McCullough - Commentator on current events from across Canadian politics

==== Previous on-air staff ====
- Charles Adler – Adler host (left September 13, 2013 after the show's cancellation); now host of a radio show on Sirius XM satellite radio
- Mark Bonokoski – Sun Media columnist; former substitute host for The Source and Charles Adler
- Theo Caldwell – The Caldwell Account host (left June 27, 2011)
- Joan Crockatt – former consultant and Sun News pundit (former MP for Calgary Centre)
- Krista Erickson – Canada Live host and Evening News Update anchor (left January 2013; was a UK-based correspondent for CBS News, currently attending law school)
- Rob Ford and Doug Ford Toronto mayor and city councillor, respectively – hosts of Ford Nation (cancelled after one episode that aired on November 18, 2013)
- Andrea Slobodian – reporter and Calgary-based co-anchor of AM Agenda (now at CKY-DT in Winnipeg)
- Mercedes Stephenson – military analyst (formerly with the Centre for Military and Strategic Studies at the University of Calgary) and Daily Brief co-host (left Sun News one week before its launch; currently with CTV News Channel)
- Neelam Verma – former host of the early morning show First Look

== See also ==
- Rebel News - online political news channel, featuring several former Sun News Network personalities, created by Ezra Levant following the demise of the Sun News Network
- The News Forum - Canadian news commentary channel launched in 2020
- Le Canal Nouvelles - Quebecor/TVA's French news channel
- Fox News - American news channel
