= Winnipeg Sun =

Daily newspaper in Winnipeg, Canada

- Front page, June 16, 2010
- Type: Daily newspaper
- Format: Tabloid
- Owner: The Klein Group
- Editor-in-chief: Heather Klein
- Founded: November 5, 1980; 45 years ago (first edition)
- Headquarters: 1700 Church Avenue; Winnipeg, Manitoba; R2X 3A2
- Circulation: 44,424 weekdays (2016 Q2); 36,905 Saturdays (2016 Q2); 38,079 Sundays (2016 Q2)
- ISSN: 0711-3773
- Website: winnipegsun.com

The Winnipeg Sun is a daily newspaper in Winnipeg, Manitoba, Canada.

It is owned by The Klein Group circa 2024. Following its acquisition of Sun Media, opinion plus an emphasis on local news stories, and extensive sports coverage.

The newspaper is distributed throughout the Winnipeg metro region through retail sales, vending machines and home delivery. According to Canadian Newspaper Association figures, the newspaper's average weekday circulation for the second quarter of 2016 (April–June) is 44,424. This figure was 36,905 on Saturdays, and 38,079 on Sundays.

== History ==
On August 27, 1980, Southam Newspapers closed the Winnipeg Tribune after 90 years in publication, leaving Winnipeg with only one daily newspaper, the Winnipeg Free Press.

While planning for the Winnipeg Sun was taking place, another group that was publishing The Downtowner and The Suburban, had publicly stated in their editorial they were strongly considering transforming their weeklies into Winnipeg's next major daily newspaper; this, however, did not happen.

In response to demand for a new newspaper voice in the city, the Winnipeg Sun was announced at a press conference in October 1980, and first published on November 5, 1980. Its founders were Al Davies, Frank Goldberg, William (Bill) A. Everitt and Tom Denton, with Denton being the first publisher. It initially published Monday, Wednesday and Friday editions. Afternoon home delivery began on December 19, 1980. Carriers collected $1.50 every two weeks from subscribers.

It extended its publication cycle to include Tuesday and Thursday editions on April 27, 1981. The paper added a Sunday edition on September 12, 1982. The Sun moved to seven-day publication in 1992.

Because the newspaper did not normally publish a Tuesday edition, a special edition reporting on assassination attempt of U.S. President Ronald Reagan was printed on March 31, 1981.

Starting August 4, 1981, the Sun moved to a morning home-delivery schedule. The newspapers were expected to be done by 6:30 a.m.

On March 10, 1982, the Sun reduced the size of the paper to more closely resemble that of the other tabloid-size newspapers.

The newspaper started publishing Sunday through Friday beginning September 12, 1982, with its largest paper to date at 120 pages.

Winnipeg is one of the few cities in Canada or the United States where a new daily newspaper emerged after the death of the No. 2 underdog. Aside from the free Metro daily publications, outside of Toronto, Winnipeg is the only other city in English Canada with two separately owned competing metropolitan daily newspapers.

In its early days, the newspaper's offices were located at 290 Garry Street in downtown Winnipeg, around the corner from the offices that had housed the defunct Winnipeg Tribune. In 1983, the newspaper moved to a building in suburban Inkster Industrial Park, presaging a similar move by the Winnipeg Free Press some years later.

In February 1983, Quebecor invested in the newspaper, at a time when circulation of the Sun had grown to 34,000 daily. Lack of advertisers and not owning its own printing press caused the paper's debts to grow. The new owners reviewed continuing Winnipeg magazine, but by June 1984 the last edition was published.

Winnipeg Sun logo used from 1999 until 2004.

On January 5, 1999, Quebecor acquired the Sun Media chain of newspapers. On May 10, 1999, the newspaper was relaunched, taking on an appearance consistent with the Toronto Sun, the Edmonton Sun, the Calgary Sun and the Ottawa Sun.

On June 22, 2020, the Sun discontinued its print edition on Mondays.

On May 27, 2024, Postmedia announced that it would sell the Winnipeg Sun, the Portage la Prairie Graphic Leader, Kenora Miner and News, and Postmedia's Winnipeg printing operations to conservative politician, Cabinet Minister, and former Sun publisher Kevin Klein. Following the takeover, Klein became a regular opinion writer for the Sun, with those he campaigned against in his political career at the city and provincial level skeptical of his ability to be unbiased.

Currently the paper is called the Winnipeg Sun-Tribune in its print edition recalling the older history newspapers in Winnipeg.

=== Comic strips ===
The Sun carries a comics page. Some of the initial comics published in the Sun were Ziggy, Frank and Ernest, Dallas, Ben Swift, John Darling, Graves, Inc., Barbara Cartland's Romances, Heathcliff, The Neighborhood, and Winthrop.

== See also ==
- Ottawa Sun
- Calgary Sun
- Edmonton Sun
- Toronto Sun
- List of newspapers in Canada
