= Alex Pierson =

Canadian broadcaster (born 1971)

Alex Pierson (born October 17, 1971 in Hamilton, Ontario) is a Canadian broadcaster.

== Biography ==
She began working in television in 1995 at CHCH-TV in Hamilton, and later became an employee of CKAL-TV in Calgary. A few years later she returned and began working at CKVR-TV in Barrie, followed by her joining CITY-TV in Toronto.

For a few years she was the co-anchor of Toronto's 11 p.m. CityNews with Mark Dailey, as well as a reporter for CityNews at Six and cp24. She left Citytv in September 2006. After a hiatus from television news, she returned and joined CIII-TV as a reporter. After 4 years reporting on courts and crime and anchoring the weekend news, Pierson left to take an anchor position with Sun News Network.

In 2011, the Sun News Network announced Pierson would be co-host of The Roundtable, the network's morning show, along with Pat Bolland and Andrea Slobodian. and subsequently hosted AM Agenda and was host of Straight Talk until Sun News Network closed in early 2015.

By 2017, Pierson was working as a radio personality at 640 Toronto. She hosted an evening talk radio show, ON Point with Alex Pierson which was also syndicated for broadcast on Global News Radio 980 CFPL in London, Ontario and Global News Radio 900 CHML in Hamilton, Ontario. In 2024, she moved to afternoons. She has been on an unexplained hiatus from her show since late March 2026, with fill-in hosts substituting (although it is still branded and promoted as the Alex Pierson Show).
