= Mark Bonokoski =

Canadian journalist and political consultant (1947–2025)

Mark Bonokoski (June 30, 1947 – July 17, 2025) was a Canadian conservative newspaper columnist and commentator. In November 2017, he was inducted into the Canadian News Hall of Fame. He covered topics ranging from civil wars in Africa to federal Canadian politics. Former Toronto Mayor John Tory once stated "He's a tough columnist but always a fair columnist."

Before returning to newspapers, he was a senior communications advisor and speechwriter for former federal Transport Minister Lisa Raitt. Previously, he was a newspaper editor and broadcaster primarily associated, until 2013, with Sun Media/QMI.

== Life and career ==
Bonokoski grew up in Lyn, Ontario. He was the son of Matt and Shirlee Bonokoski and had three sisters, Eris, Nayda and Cara, and one brother, Kurt (1952–2002). His father was originally from rural Saskatchewan and served in the Royal Canadian Air Force during World War II.

Bonokoski was a graduate of Ryerson Polytechnical Institute's journalism programme. He worked as a general assignment reporter with the Calgary Herald and then the Windsor Star before joining the Toronto Sun in 1974. He was promoted to columnist in 1977 and served in various capacities with the Sun and its parent companies in the ensuing decades. He was Sun Media's European Bureau Chief from 1988 to 1991, based in London, England. In 1991, he was appointed editor of the Ottawa Sun and then became the paper's publisher and CEO in 1997. In 2000, he returned to writing as national affairs columnist for Sun Media and then returned to the Toronto Sun as a columnist in 2002. In 2010 he was appointed National Editorial Writer for the Sun chain of newspapers. In 2011, he also became a regular contributor on the chain's all-news channel, the Sun News Network, appearing regularly as a commentator or substitute host on various programmes. In a round of layoffs at Sun Media, Bonokoski's contract was terminated and his final column appeared July 20, 2013. Following his forays as a senior political staffer provincially and later federally, Bonokoski subsequently returned to the newspaper business in 2015 as a contract columnist for the Postmedia Network (Sun Media division), largely on national political affairs, writing upwards of four columns a week.

His freelance work appeared in Maclean's and Reader's Digest among others.

Bonokoski was also a fishing and outdoor enthusiast who contributed commentaries to Outdoor Journal Radio. He also provided weekly commentaries to the Haliburton Broadcasting Group network of Moose-FM radio stations in Ontario's cottage country under their sale to a Western Canadian chain. He was also an instructor to fourth-year graduating students at Ryerson University's School of Journalism. Bonokoski won the National Newspaper Award for column writing in 2004.

=== Political activity ===
Bonokoski attempted to enter politics in the 2000 federal election when he sought the nomination of the Canadian Alliance party in Ottawa West—Nepean but was defeated as some party members felt he was too moderate. In 2013, he was appointed Director of Communications for Tim Hudak, who was Leader of the Opposition Progressive Conservatives in Ontario until the party's defeat in the 2014 provincial election. He then became senior communications advisor and speechwriter for then federal Transport Minister Lisa Raitt up to the federal election in 2015.

=== Personal life and death ===
Bonokoski married Karen Ann Foley in 1984. They had one child, Erin.

Bonokoski officially retired in June 2023, at the age of 74. He died from lung cancer on July 17, 2025, at the age of 76.
