= Andrew Lawton =

Andrew Lawton may refer to:

- Andrew Lawton (actor) (born 1978), Australian actor and director
- Andrew Lawton (politician) (born 1989), Canadian politician, author, and journalist
