= Krista Erickson =

Canadian journalist

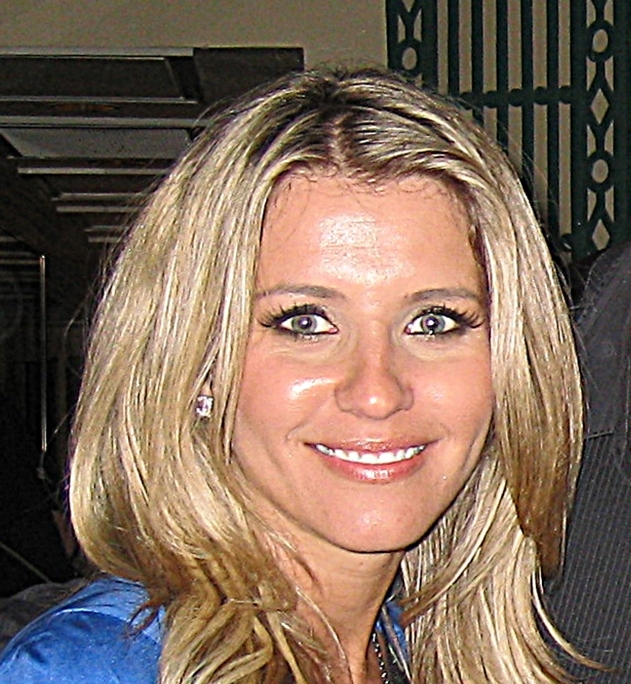
- Krista Erickson
- Education: Red River College; BPP Law School (LL.B.) (LL.M.)
- Occupations: Television news anchor; journalist
- Years active: 1999-2013
- Employers: CBC News; Sun News Network
- Known for: CBC News: The National

Krista Erickson is a Canadian former broadcast journalist.

From April 2011 until January 2013, she served as the principal daytime anchor for the Sun News Network hosting the program, Canada Live from the channel's Toronto studios. Prior to joining Sun News, Erickson worked for Canadian Broadcasting Corporation for 11 years, latterly as a member of the network's parliamentary bureau.

== Early life ==
Krista Erickson graduated from Red River College program in Creative Communications in 1999.

== Biography ==
Erickson started her career in 1999 in her hometown of Winnipeg, Manitoba with the Canadian Broadcasting Corporation, Canada's national public television and radio broadcaster. She joined CBC Manitoba as a researcher with a focus on investigative journalism carrying out investigative research for network programs such as It's a Living and CBC News: Disclosure Country Canada and the CBC's local investigative unit: The ITEAM.

In the fall of 2003, she hosted CBC News: Canada Now while Jennifer Rattray was on maternity leave. Erickson rose through the ranks of CBC Manitoba first as an associate producer, local reporter and in 2004, she was appointed lead news anchor for CBC Manitoba's supper hour newscast, CBC News at Six. She remained a frequent contributor to network programs during this time, including CBC's newscast, The National and the network consumer affairs program, Marketplace.

In 2004, Erickson was nominated by the Academy of Canadian Cinema and Television for a Gemini Award in the category of Best Lifestyle/Practical information segment for a reality TV style documentary she hosted and co-produced for Marketplace called, "Love and Little White Lies".

In 2006, she joined CBC's parliamentary bureau in Ottawa where she remained until leaving CBC for Sun News in 2010.

In 2008, she was accused of bias while covering the Mulroney-Schreiber hearings when she was accused of feeding questions to former Liberal Member of Parliament Pablo Rodriguez. An investigation by the CBC ombudsman cleared her of any charge of bias. However, Norman Spector wrote that "Ms. Erickson and Mr. Richardson (a Conservative MP) were being seen together in Ottawa as early as the summer of 2008, but the relationship was not reported. Had Canadians known this in December of 2008, more of us may have questioned the story that Ms. Erickson had conspired with a Liberal MP against a former Conservative prime minister." It is suggested that she was rewarded for having derailed the public conversation, winning employment opportunities in return.

Erickson promoted the launch of Sun News by appearing as a Sunshine Girl on the day of the channel's premiere.

In June 2011, an interview by Erickson of interpretive dancer Margie Gillis generated 6,676 complaints to the Canadian Broadcast Standards Council due to what some viewed as Erickson's aggressive tone when she challenged Gllis to explain why artists like herself deserved public funding. The Canadian Broadcast Standards Council ruled that the interview did not violate the country's broadcast standards.

In January 2013, Erickson left Sun News Network and began working as a freelance foreign correspondent based in London and filed reports for CBS News. By the end of the year, she had left journalism for law school. She graduated with a Bachelor of Laws degree in 2015 and a Master of Laws in 2017 from BPP Law School in London, England.

== Awards and nominations ==
Year	Association	Category	Production	Result
2004	Gemini Awards	Best Lifestyle / Practical Information	Marketplace "Love and Little White Lies"	Nominated
