= Alex Mihailovich =

Canadian broadcaster

Alex Mihailovich is a veteran television journalist and foreign affairs expert. His reporting has focused on Ukraine, Russia, the Balkans, China, US and the Middle East. Born and raised in Toronto, Alex has also extensively covered Canadian politics through his decades long career. Since 2015, Alex Mihailovich has been an independent journalist with frequent appearances on RT and radio programs, as well as guesting on the CBC and a number of podcasts. He was a reporter and news anchor at Sun News Network in Canada from 2011 until the television station closed its doors in 2015. Prior to that, Alex was a reporter for Global News Toronto and a correspondent for 16:9 – The Bigger Picture, a Canadian investigative news magazine television series which aired nationally on Global TV. At the beginning of his career, Alex was with CTV Television Network for 5 years, which included a role as news anchor at CTV Northern Ontario and as a reporter at CTV Toronto. He attended Carleton University, where he was a founding member of the Sigma Pi fraternity chapter. He graduated from Seneca College with a radio-television broadcast diploma and has a BA Honours degree in political science from the University of Western Ontario. Before becoming a journalist, he worked for a United Nations agency in the former Yugoslavia from 1995 to 1999, where attained an MBA.
