= Mesmerised (TV series) =

Australian comedy/hypnotism television series

- Genre: Comedy/Hypnotism
- Presented by: Peter Powers
- Country of origin: Australia
- Original language: English
- No. of seasons: 1
- No. of episodes: 6 (5 unaired)

Production
- Executive producer: Paul Melville
- Running time: 30 minutes (inc. adverts)
- Production company: Endemol Australia

Original release
- Network: Seven Network
- Release: 15 October 2015

Related
- The Power of One

Mesmerised is an Australian television series involving hypnotist Peter Powers traveling around Australia with actors and volunteers willing to be hypnotised by Powers and made to perform amusing and often embarrassing acts. The series was produced for the Seven Network by Endemol Australia.

The series premiered in Australia on 15 October 2015 on the Seven Network. Although six episodes were produced, the program was pulled from the broadcast schedule after low ratings for its debut episode. The Seven Network planned to air the remaining episodes weekly on 7flix on Sunday afternoons at 5:00pm.

== Episodes ==
=== Season 1 (2015) ===
No.	Title	Original release date	Australian viewers
1	"Episode 1"	15 October 2015	411,000
Hypnotist Peter Powers is unleashed on the unsuspecting Australian public, using his hypnosis skills to make a man marry an alpaca and cause mayhem during a speed dating event.
2	"Episode 2"	24 November 2019	N/A
3	"Episode 3"	1 December 2019	N/A
Peter convinces two heterosexual female friends, Louise and Kat, that they're long-term lesbian lovers and the pair legally marry, before they are awoken in their honeymoon bed.
4	"Episode 4"	8 December 2019	N/A
5	"Episode 5"	N/A	TBD
6	"Episode 6"	N/A	TBD
