= Cancellation (broadcasting) =

Abrupt ending of a radio or television program by the network or syndicator

In broadcasting, cancellation refers to when a radio or television program is abruptly ended by orders of the network or syndicator that distributes the show, usually against the intentions of the show's creators or producers.

Programs are typically canceled for financial reasons; low viewership or listenership will lead to lower advertising or subscription revenue, prompting networks to replace it with another show with the potential to turn a larger profit. In unusual cases, a series may be cancelled if extenuating circumstances make continuing it to its conclusion untenable.

== Overview ==
Commercial television and radio is supported by advertising. Subscription outlets, including cable and satellite television and satellite radio, have the additional revenue stream of subscriber fees (broadcast stations in some areas may also have retransmission consent privileges, but this is not universal; Canada, for instance, does not allow it); television and radio networks can also collect affiliate fees from the stations in their network for the privilege of carrying network programs. Viewing figures are collected by audience measurement ratings agencies (such as Nielsen in the United States), and the programs with the highest viewing figures command a higher advertising fee for the network. As such, shows with a low viewership are generally not as profitable. For most United States networks, the number of viewers within the 18–49 age range is more important than the total number of viewers. According to Advertising Age, during the 2007–08 season, Grey's Anatomy was able to charge $419,000 per television commercial, compared to only $248,000 for a commercial during CSI, despite CSI having almost five million more viewers on average. Due to its strength in young demographics, Friends was able to charge almost three times as much for a commercial as Murder, She Wrote, even though the two television series had similar total viewer numbers during the seasons they were on the air together.

Whether the show is produced by the network or an outside company can also factor into a show's future; networks, especially in the 21st century, tend to prefer shows that are produced in-house, as they can take advantage of vertical integration and, in addition to making money from the first run of the show on the network, continue to profit from syndicating the reruns. A television series that attempts to tell a long, overarching story can be canceled even before it resolves all story arcs and broadcasts all of its planned episodes.

== Saved from cancellation ==
A successful letter-writing campaign helped revive Cagney & Lacey. In 2007, Jericho was given an additional seven-episode order after fans mailed thousands of pounds of nuts to network executives (a reference to a pivotal line in the season finale).

Strong home video sales and viewership on cable have also helped revive a series. Firefly and Police Squad! were revived in the form of theatrical films (an uncommon occurrence, since failed television series are usually not considered bankable movie material), Family Guy was returned to Fox, and Futurama (the volume 5 DVD cover touts the tag line "back by popular harassment!") returned in the form of straight to video films and a subsequent series of new television episodes for Comedy Central (although Comedy Central would later cancel the show itself in 2013 before it was revived again for Hulu in 2023). Arrested Development was revived for a fourth season in 2013 (seven years after being canceled by Fox) as a Netflix Original Series, after episodes of its initial run proved popular on the streaming service.

In 2018, Fox canceled the police procedural sitcom Brooklyn Nine-Nine, and police procedural urban fantasy Lucifer. Brooklyn Nine-Nine was picked up by NBC the following day, while Lucifer was picked up by Netflix the following month.

A show can instead be retooled if the network thinks that changes can be made to a struggling program that will make the show more profitable and/or higher-rated. In a retooling, characters may be replaced or recast, plots may be abandoned, and in some cases, continuity can be erased and the name of the show changed, depending on how extensive of a retool is undertaken. In more extreme cases, a retooling can resemble a full reboot of the storyline. One example of such a scenario was Lovers and Friends, which was placed on hiatus in May 1977 and was retitled as For Richer, For Poorer when it returned in December; the program would end in September 1978.

== See also ==
- List of television series canceled before airing an episode
- List of television series canceled after one episode
