= Andrew Lawton (actor) =

Australian actor and director

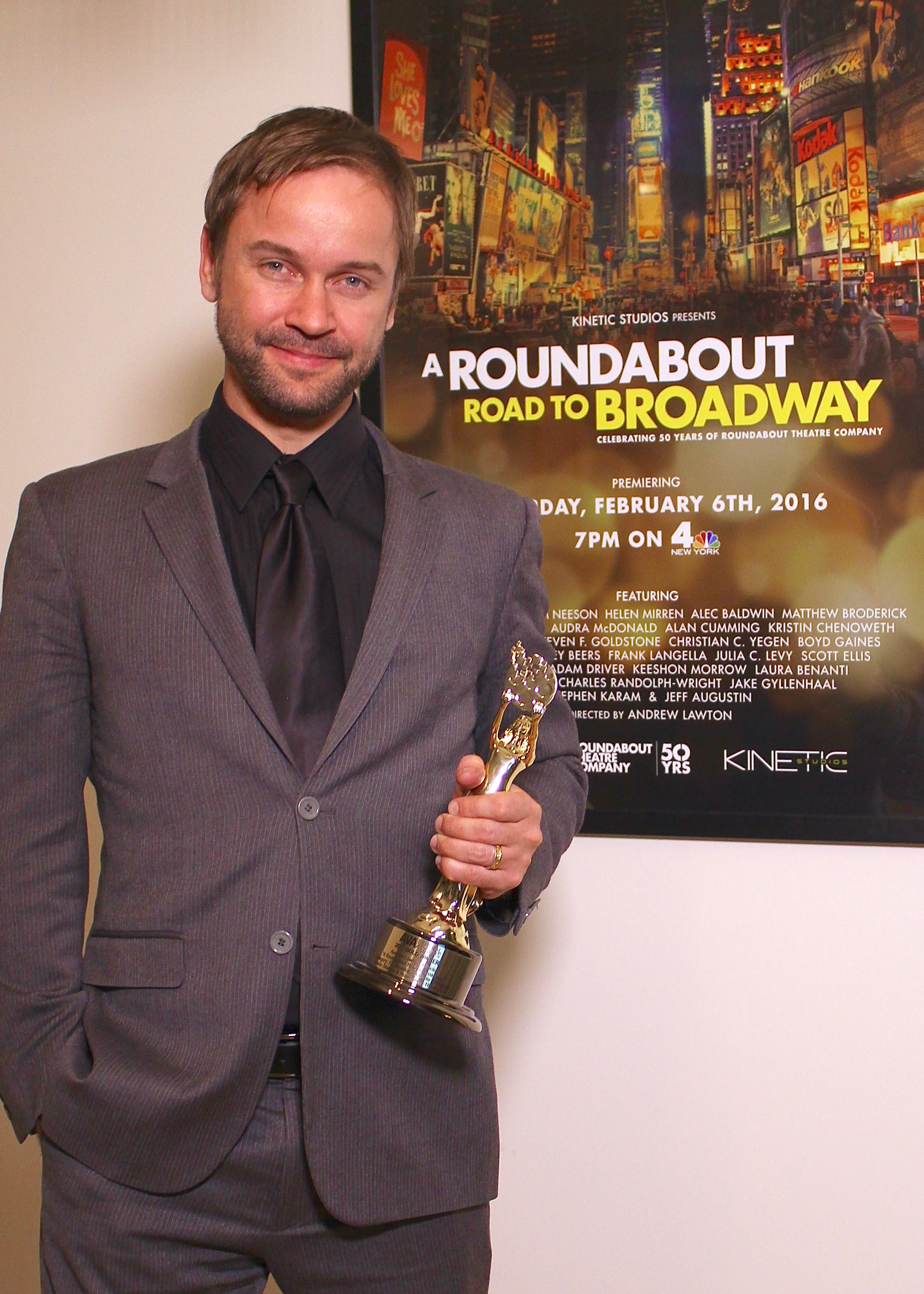
- Born: 14 January 1978 (age 48); Melbourne, Australia
- Occupations: Film Director, Screenwriter & Actor
- Spouse: Darcy Lawton
- Website: http://andrew-lawton.com

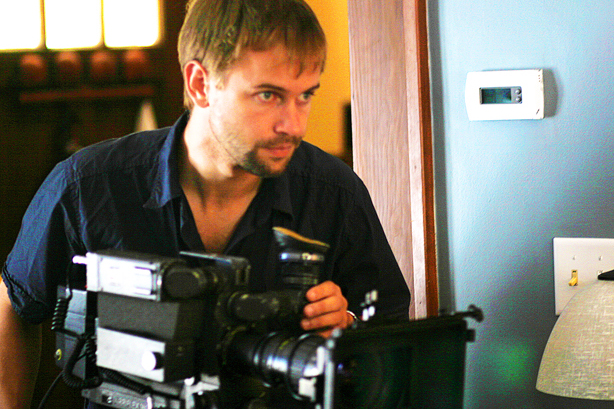
Andrew Lawton on the set of 'Wake'

Andrew Lawton (born 14 January 1978) is an Australian film director, television director, screenwriter, and actor. He was born in Melbourne, Australia, and is a graduate of The University of Melbourne and Sarah Lawrence College in New York.

As an actor, Lawton is known for roles on the television series Neighbours, State Coroner and One Life to Live. He is the owner and creative director of Kinetic Studios, a production company in New York City, and most recently directed Neil Patrick Harris in A Roundabout Road to Broadway for NBC. As a filmmaker, Lawton's credits include writing and directing the films Rain, Wake, Couch Surfer and Have You Seen Calvin?.

== Early life ==
Andrew Lawton is the youngest of four boys raised in the suburbs of Melbourne, Australia. As a child, he was a professional boy soprano and toured regularly as a member of The Victorian Boys Choir. On a 1989 tour of the United Kingdom, Lawton and the choir performed in famed Westminster Abbey. He was named deputy leader of the choir in 1991 and choir leader in 1992. This early choral career led Lawton to musical theatre, where he performed in over a dozen musicals as a teen. His acting breakthrough came with being cast in the role of Jake Black on soap opera Neighbours in 2000.

== Personal life ==
Lawton resides in Battery Park City in Lower Manhattan with his wife, Darcy Lawton and two children. The films that have most inspired his career include Back to the Future, Aliens, The Terminator, Terminator 2: Judgment Day, Ghostbusters, When Harry Met Sally and Dead Poets Society.

== Awards ==
Year	Award	Result	Project
2017	Telly Awards	Winner	"A Roundabout Road to Broadway" [Director]
2017	Hermes Creative Awards - Gold Award	Winner	"A Roundabout Road to Broadway" [Director]
2017	AVA Digital Awards - Gold Award	Winner	"A Roundabout Road to Broadway" [Director]
2017	Creativity International Awards - Gold Award	Winner	"A Roundabout Road to Broadway" [Director]
2016	Chicago Comedy Film Festival - Best Film	Winner	"Have You Seen Calvin?" [Writer/Director]
2016	Burbank International Film Festival - Best Short	Nominated	"Have You Seen Calvin?" [Writer/Director]
2010	Atlanta International Film Festival - Best Narrative Short	Nominated	"Wake" [Writer/Director]
2009	Indie Memphis Film Festival - Best Short Film [Narrative/Drama]	Nominated	"Wake" [Writer/Director]

== Film and television credits ==
- Actor:
  - State Coroner - Marcus Tessler (1998)
  - Neighbours - Jake Black (2000)
  - Rain - Tim Harrison (2000)
  - One Life to Live - Logan (2005)
  - The Protector - Officer Rick (2005)
  - Couch Surfer - Stevo (2016)
- Writer/director:
  - Rain (2000)
  - Some Guy Called Toby (2003)
  - Wake (2009)
  - A Roundabout Road to Broadway - NBC (2016)
  - Have You Seen Calvin? (2016)
  - Couch Surfer (2016)
