= Sunshine Girl =

Pin-up girls in Canadian newspapers

Pin-up girls depicted in most of the daily newspapers of the Sun chain in Canada are known as Sunshine Girls.

== History ==
The Sunshine Girls feature started with the Toronto Sun, on November 1, 1971. The practice was adapted from British tabloids with similar featured women. While the British tabloids started publishing photos of topless models in 1970, a Sunshine Girl is usually a clothed or swim-suited female model, actress, or athlete.

The feature was printed in black and white from the 1970s to the early 1980s, alternated between color and black and white until the 1990s, then usually in color.

The Sun chain was owned by Sun Media until acquired by Postmedia Network in 2014.

Typically on page 3 of the Sun in the 1990s, the Sunshine Girl moved to the back page of the sports section in the early 2000s. In 2011, the Sunshine Girl was restored to page 3 in some, not all, Sun newspapers, and two different photos of the same Sunshine Girl are run each day. Famous former SUNshine girls include: Amanda Coetzer, Ann Rohmer, Trish Stratus, Stacy Keibler, and Krista Erickson (Sun News Network anchor, who appeared on the date of that network's 2011 launch).

Additional images of the day's Sunshine Girl are posted each day to the Sun newspapers' websites, along with behind-the-scenes videos of select models.

At least twice a year, the Sun Group produces and sells a calendar featuring a selection of Sunshine Girls. Typically, the Girls who are selected for the calendar are chosen by the public online and by a mail-in vote.

The studio for Sunshine Girls closed in early 2020 during the COVID-19 pandemic in Canada and remained closed as of May 2025. In the meantime, the publications re-ran old Sunshine Girl spots, mostly form 2017-2019 repeatedly, including up to 10 times for some models. The reruns were publicly disclosed in the feature and resulted in some upset comments from online readers of the feature. The reruns were also criticized by some past models who did not expect the frequent re-runs many years afterwards and without any rights renegotiation. Canadian media critic Jan Wong noted the repetition of models as a cost-cutting measure that marked the decline of the Canadian journalism industry.

After the sale of the Winnipeg Sun to Kevin Klein in 2024, the new ownership ended the feature as part of a modernizing revamp, citing the repetition and the clash with the new leadership's values. It was planned to be replaced by a new feature recognizing Manitobans who volunteered.

== Spinoffs and knockoffs ==
- There was a Sunshine Boy feature in the Sun as well, further on in each daily paper. This feature lasted until the early 2000s and was discontinued in 2006.
- Sunshine Girl Magazine is a men's magazine published from Miami, Florida, US, derived from the Sun's annual Sunshine Girl calendar.

== Criticism ==
The Sunshine Girl series has been criticized by some readers and media commentators for objectifying women. Critics have also condemned the series as degrading and inappropriate for a newspaper as a medium that purports to publish credible journalism. On November 14, 1985, the Ontario Press Council upheld at least one reader complaint, saying the feature "portrays women as sex objects", although there were no penalties attached to this ruling. Margaret Coulter of Toronto made the complaint, saying a newspaper was not an appropriate medium for the suggestive photos, which made her feel "embarrassed and offended." Coulter said she had the same feelings about the Sunshine Boy feature.

== See also ==
- Page 3
