= The Power of One (TV series) =

Australian TV series about hypnosis

'The Power of One' was an Australian television series which ran for two seasons between 2006 and 2008 and featured hypnotist Peter Powers hypnotising "subjects" and forcing them to perform amusing and often embarrassing acts.

== Content ==
The hypnotism in the show usually aims for comedy rather than exhibiting the hypnotist's skill. Examples of the acts performed on the show include:

- hypnotising someone to think they are driving an expensive car, when in fact they are driving a cheap one, or a bumper car at a fair.
- exploiting a personal weakness, such as arachnophobia or shyness.
- sexually centered acts, such as convincing a man that each of the holes in a pool table is a woman that he has to satisfy.
- making a person do something embarrassing, such as achieving instant orgasm, in response to a pre-set trigger.

== Broadcast ==
The show aired on The Comedy Channel on Australian subscription television service Foxtel.
