= Ottawa Sun =

Canadian daily newspaper in Ontario

- Type: Daily newspaper
- Format: Tabloid
- Owner: Postmedia
- Editor-in-chief: Michelle Richardson
- Deputy editor: Keith Bonnell
- Founded: 1983 as Sunday Herald, 1988 as the Sun
- Headquarters: 1101 Baxter Road; Ottawa, Ontario; K2C 3M4
- Circulation: 45,442 weekdays 36,297 Saturdays; 38,456 Sundays (as of 2011)
- ISSN: 0843-2570
- OCLC number: 19898585
- Website: www.ottawasun.com

The Ottawa Sun is a daily newspaper in Ottawa, Ontario, Canada. It is published by Sun Media. It began publication in 1983 as the Ottawa Sunday Herald, until it was acquired by (then) Toronto Sun Publishing Corporation in 1988. In April 2015, Sun Media papers were acquired by Postmedia.

A Sunday edition of the newly named Ottawa Sun began publication on September 4, 1988 and a daily publication started on November 7, 1988. As with its sister papers, it has a "Sunshine Girl" feature, although in the past it also contained a "Sunshine Boy" feature.

Past editors include Peter Worthington and Mark Bonokoski. The current editor-in-chief since 2016 is former managing editor of the Montreal Gazette, Michelle Richardson. Its editorials are often considered conservative-leaning.

== Notable journalists ==
- Scott Burnside, journalist and sportswriter
- Earl McRae, journalist and sportswriter

== See also ==
- List of newspapers in Canada
