= GRNlive =

Journalism organization

Global Radio News Limited
- Trade name: GRNlive
- Industry: Journalism
- Founded: London, United Kingdom (2000)
- Founder: Henry Peirse
- Headquarters: London, United Kingdom
- Area served: Worldwide
- Key people: Henry Peirse (CEO)
- Number of employees: 3 (2013)
- Website: grnlive.com

GRNlive represents over 1000 journalists who report on-demand for major news organisations, including CBC News, France 24, RTÉ News, CBS News, BBC News, Al Jazeera and Fox News. It was created in the 1990s under the name Global Radio News and was an early adopter of the internet for audio productions.

GRNlive correspondents are available for live radio or ‘in-vision’ interviews and reports. GRNlive has provided coverage for every major news event in the past decade, including the wars in Iraq and Afghanistan, the tsunamis in East-Asia (2004 & 2011), the post-elections protest in Iran, the red-shirt revolt in Thailand, the Chilean Mine crisis, the floods in Australia, the Arab Spring and the death of Osama bin Laden. GRNlive also represents photographers, artists, commentators, videographers and fixers for bespoke assignments. GRNlive also provides the link between news and information gathering in the field with risk analysis and corporate clients worldwide.
