= Peter Powers =

British hypnotist

Peter Powers is a British television personality and hypnotist from Bolton, Lancashire. In Australia he appears on the Rugby League television Footy Show.

== Career ==
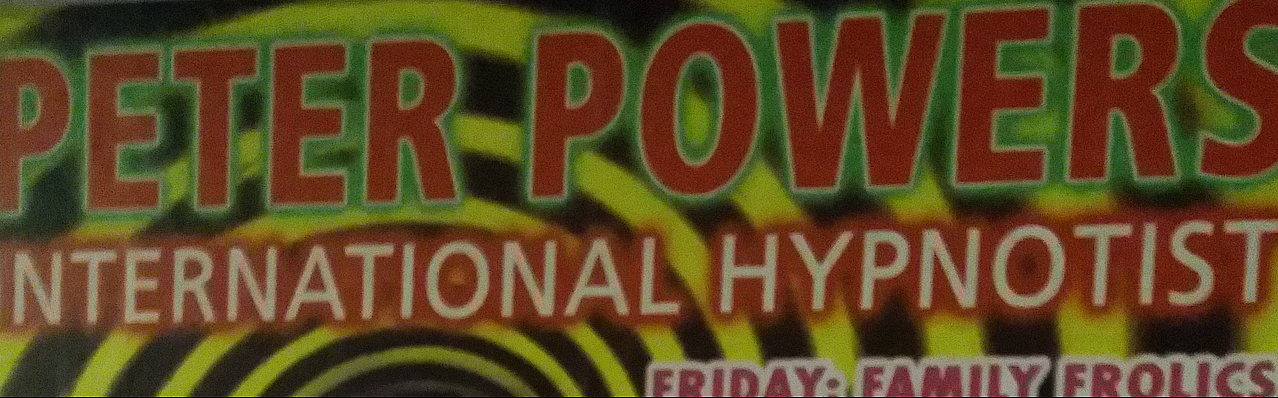
Detail of a poster about Peter Powers' show in Glasgow, 2019

Powers has made several TV shows; The Power of One, which is filmed in Australia, and Street Hypnosis which was filmed in the UK.

He made five one-hour TV specials for UK's Channel 5, entitled The Naughty, Naughty Hypnoshow and recorded two one-hour TV specials for Network 9 in Australia in which celebrities were hypnotised.

In 2008, he appeared in a one-hour special ("Housemates Hypnotized") on Big Brother Australia 2008, where he hypnotized many of the willing housemates.

His TV show in the Netherlands, Peter Powers' Payback, a 10-part series, was broadcast in early 2009.

On 2 June 2012, he appeared on an episode of "Australia's Funniest Home Videos" (themed "Everything's Cool"), where he hypnotised three audience members, first convincing them their dancing was "cool", then that their pants were down around their ankles.

In October 2015, the six-part series Mesmerised, fronted by Powers, began airing on Channel Seven in Australia.
