= Newspaper endorsements in the 2011 Canadian federal election =

This is a tally of newspaper and magazine endorsements in the 2011 Canadian federal election.

== Endorsing the Conservative Party ==
- The Brampton Guardian
- The Recorder and Times (Brockville)
- Burlington Post
- Calgary Herald
- Calgary Sun
- The Economist
- Edmonton Journal
- Edmonton Sun
- Etobicoke Guardian
- The Globe and Mail
- The Mississauga News
- The Gazette (Montreal)
- The Hamilton Spectator
- Inside Toronto
- Maclean's
- National Post
- Oakville Beaver
- Ottawa Citizen—Endorsed a Conservative majority government, but also endorsed individual candidates at a riding level: Bernadette Clément in Stormont-Dundas-South, Steve MacKinnon in Gatineau, David Bertschi in Ottawa-Orléans, David McGuinty in Ottawa South, Gordon O’Connor in Carleton-Mississippi Mills, John Baird in Ottawa West-Nepean, Pierre Lemieux in Glengarry-Prescott-Russell, Scott Reid in Lanark-Frontenac-Lennox and Addington, Lawrence Cannon in Pontiac, Rem Westland in Ottawa-Vanier, Pierre Poilievre in Nepean-Carleton, Gordon Brown in Leeds-Grenville, Nycole Turmel in Hull-Aylmer, Paul Dewar in Ottawa-Centre, and Hector Clouthier in Renfrew-Nipissing-Pembroke
- Ottawa Sun
- The Province (Vancouver)
- The Suburban (Quebec)
- Sudbury Star
- Toronto Sun
- The Vancouver Sun
- Waterloo Region Record
- Windsor Star
- Winnipeg Free Press
- Winnipeg Sun

== Endorsing the New Democratic Party ==
- Now (Toronto)
- Toronto Star—Endorsed the Liberals in close Liberal/Conservative ridings. Also were clear that Harper should not get another mandate.

== Endorsing the Liberal Party ==
- The Toronto Observer—Endorsement was more of a local one for the ridings of: Scarborough-Rouge River, Scarborough-Agincourt, Pickering-Scarborough East, Scarborough Centre, Scarborough-Guildwood, and Scarborough Southwest, than a national one.
- The Vancouver Observer

== Endorsing the Bloc Québécois ==
- Le Devoir

== Endorsing multiple parties ==
- The Georgia Straight—Recommended strategic voting for specific candidates to prevent the election of Conservatives, except for in Port Moody—Westwood—Port Coquitlam
- La Presse (Montreal)—Recommended the Liberals in Outremont, Westmount-Ville-Marie and Papineau, NDP in Rosemont-La-Petite-Patrie, Abitibi-Baie-James-Nunavik-Eeyou and Hull-Aylmer, and Conservatives in Mégantic-L'Érable, Pontiac and Lac-Saint-Louis.

== Explicitly endorsing no party ==
- Le Soleil (Quebec City)—Recommended voting for the best local candidate.

== See also ==
- Newspaper endorsements in the Canadian federal election, 2015
- Newspaper endorsements in the Canadian federal election, 2008
- Newspaper endorsements in the Canadian federal election, 2006
