= Newspaper endorsements in the 2015 Canadian federal election =

This is a tally of newspaper and magazine endorsements in the 2015 Canadian federal election. Endorsements are organized by ownership and/or publisher, as the owner sometimes sets the endorsement policy of the paper, occasionally overriding the editorial board.

== Endorsing the Conservative Party ==
=== Postmedia ===
Management at Postmedia Network, the largest newspaper chain in Canada, ordered its individual assets to endorse the Conservatives, as traditionally is the owner's prerogative. Andrew Coyne resigned as editor of editorials and comment for the National Post after being denied permission by Postmedia executives to publish a column dissenting from the paper's endorsement of the Conservatives.

- Calgary Sun, Edmonton Sun, Ottawa Sun, Toronto Sun, Winnipeg Sun all republished an endorsement credited to Postmedia.
- Calgary Herald, Edmonton Journal, London Free Press, Montreal Gazette, National Post, Ottawa Citizen, The Province, Regina Leader Post, The StarPhoenix, Vancouver Sun, The Windsor Star

=== Woodbridge ===
- The Globe and Mail, but with a desire for Harper's resignation. The mixed endorsement sparked viral online parody and derision.

=== Sochaczevski ===
- The Suburban

== Endorsing the NDP ==
- Prince Arthur Herald

== Endorsing the Liberal Party ==
=== Torstar ===
While the majority of Torstar papers endorsed the Liberals, as a matter of policy, the company does not impose endorsements on its newspapers.

- Burlington Post, Guelph Mercury, Hamilton Spectator, Oakville Beaver, Toronto Star, Waterloo Region Record

=== TC Transcontinental ===
- Charlottetown Guardian

=== Northwest ===
- Gastown Gazette

=== Gesca ===
- La Presse

=== Laurentian ===
- Northern Life

== Endorsing the Bloc Québécois ==
- Le Devoir

== Endorsing multiple parties ==
- Maclean's, indicating readers should vote Liberal or Conservative.
- Now – Co-owner Michael Hollett endorsed the NDP, while fellow co-owner Alice Klein called for strategic voting for "as many Liberals, NDPers and Greens as possible".
- The Ubyssey, arguing readers should vote strategically to defeat the Conservatives
- The Varsity, calling for strategic voting towards the Liberal, NDP, or Green, candidate in each riding with the best chance of defeating the conservative candidate

== Explicitly endorsing no party ==
- Gauntlet, endorses and satirizes all the three major parties.
- The Runner, arguing that young people need to vote to be better represented.
- Le Soleil
- Winnipeg Free Press

== See also ==
- Endorsements from individuals and organizations in the 2015 Canadian federal election
- Newspaper endorsements in the Canadian federal election, 2019
- Newspaper endorsements in the Canadian federal election, 2011
- Newspaper endorsements in the Canadian federal election, 2008
- Newspaper endorsements in the Canadian federal election, 2006
