= Media in the Regional Municipality of Peel =

This is a list of media based in the Regional Municipality of Peel, Ontario, part of the Greater Toronto Area.

== Radio ==
Frequency	Call sign	Branding	Format	Owner	City of license	Notes
AM 960	CKNT	Sauga 960 AM	News/talk	8159203 Canada Ltd.	Mississauga	
AM 1650	CINA	CINA	Community radio	Neeti Prakash Ray	Mississauga	Multicultural station primarily targeted to Indian and Pakistani immigrant audiences
FM 91.9	CKC455	CFRE	Campus radio	University of Toronto Mississauga Students' Union	Mississauga	Campus radio station of the University of Toronto Mississauga

== Online Radio & Radio Programs ==
Frequency / Website	Branding	Owner	Notes
CMR FM 101.3 (Monday-Friday | 7:00 - 9:00 PM) Online 24/7 Radio - www.radiopakistan.fm	Radio Pakistan Toronto	Arshad Bhatti	Radio Pakistan Toronto, can be heard 24/7 via online radio and between 7:00 - 9:00 PM from Monday - Friday on CMR 101.3 FM

== Television ==
The region is not home to any local television stations of its own beyond community stations operated by television service providers.

- Rogers TV (only available to Rogers Cable subscribers)
- TV1 (only available to Bell Fibe TV subscribers)

Over-the-air television service is entirely received from the neighbouring city of Toronto.

However, several nationally distributed cable television services maintain their base of operations in the Peel region.

- The Shopping Channel, broadcasts nationally from Mississauga
- The Weather Network, formerly broadcast nationally from Mississauga (1988-2005)
- Makeful, Canada's first interactive television station.

Digital TV Channels:

- Toronto 360 TV, broadcasting from Mississauga to global viewers. Catering to the South Asian community living in Canada.

== Periodicals ==
- Languages: EN = English, FR = French, GU = Gujarati, HI = Hindi, LT = Lithuanian, PA = Punjabi, PT = Portuguese UR = Urdu
- Locations: BL = Bolton, BR = Brampton, CA = Caledon, MS = Mississauga, OK = Oakville, TT = Toronto Township

=== Newspapers ===
Sortable table
Name	City	Lang.	Ownership	First issue	Last issue	Frequency	Notes
Aar-Paar	MS					Monthly	
Ajitweekly	MS	PA	Ajit Publications			Weekly	
Akhbaar-e-Pakistan	MS	UR					
Al-Mughtarib	MS					Monthly	
Ambition, The	MS	EN	The Ambition	1987		Bi-monthly	For young Muslims. Independent non-profit.
Arabglobe	MS		Magic Media Inc.			Bi-weekly.	
Ask Me Biz	BR						Indian/South Asian themed to catering.
Asian Connections	MS						Online only. Also radio and TV.
Asianstar News	BR						Indian/South Asian.
Weekly AWAM Toronto	MS	UR	Urdu Times Group of Publications	1987		Weekly	Name means "public".
Banner and Times, The	BR	EN					
Bolton Enterprise, The	BL	EN					
Bramalea Guardian, The	BR	EN					
Brampton Bulletin, The	BR	EN	Unknown	2005	2006-11	Weekly	
Brampton Business Times	BR	EN					
Brampton Guardian, The	BR	EN	North Peel Media Group (Metroland)	1964-08-13		Twice a week	Founded as the Bramalea Guardian.
Brampton Guardian Booster, The	BR	EN	North Peel Media Group (Metroland)				
The Bramptonian	BR	EN					
Brampton Progress, The	BR	EN					
The Brampton Times	BR	EN					
Brampton Weekly Standard	BR	EN	W. J. Squire	1800s	Unknown	Weekly	
British Standard, The	BL	EN					
Caledon Citizen	CA	EN	Caledon Publishing Ltd.				
Caledon Enterprise	CA	EN	North Peel Media Group (Metroland)				
Canadian Punjabi Post	BR	PA	Jagdish Grewal	c. 2002	-	Daily Indian/ South Asian	
CanIndia News	MS	EN	World Media Corp.	c. 1991		Weekly	Audited by BPA - Indian/South Asian.
Cardwell Observer, The	BL	EN					
Christian Herald, The	BR	EN					
City Parent	OK	EN				Monthly	Has a Peel Edition, published from Oakville.
Clarkson's Corners	MS	EN					
Confidence Bound	MS	EN					
Conservator, The	BR	EN					
Daily South Asian Free Press							Indian/South Asian.
Eastern News	MS	UR	Urdu Promotion Board of Canada	1979-06		Bi-weekly	
El Expreso: National Spanish Newspaper	MS	ES	El Expreso Production			Weekly	
El Mundo Latino News	MS	ES	Anasaria Romero			Weekly	
GEO Pakistan	MS	UR					
Goodlife	MS	EN	Mississauga Media Group (Metroland)				
Growler, The	BR	EN					
Gujarat Abroad							
Hamdard Weekly	MS						
Harness Edge, The	BR	EN					
Hello Pages	BR						
Hindi Abroad	BR	HI					
India Journal	MS	EN	Sakal Information Systems Inc.	c. 1991		Weekly	Indian/South Asian.
Indian Express Canada	MS	EN					Canadian edition of New York-based paper.
Indo-Canadian Samay	MS	HI	Indo Canadian Samay Inc.	c. 2008		Weekly	
Inside Mississauga	MS						
Kanadske Listy	MS	CS/SK	Mike Janecek	1973			
Kanadsky Slovak	MS	SK	Canadian Slovak League	1942		Weekly	
Khabarnama Punjabi Weekly	BR	PA	Khabarnama Punjabi Weekly			Weekly	
L'Express	TT	FR	L'Express	1976		Weekly	
Magic Carpet, Bissat-Erreeh	MS						
Manor	MS	EN	Mississauga Media Group (Metroland)				
Marquee Magazine	MS						
Medium, The	MS	EN	Medium II Publications	1974		Weekly	Student newspaper of the University of Toronto Mississauga
Mercury, The	BR	EN					
MidWeek News Weekly	MS	EN					Indian/South Asian.
Mississauga Booster	MS	EN	Mississauga Media Group (Metroland)				
Mississauga Business Times	MS	EN	Mississauga Media Group (Metroland)				
Mississauga News, The	MS	EN	Mississauga Media Group (Metroland)				
Namaste Canada	BR	GU				Bi-weekly.	
Pakistan Post	MS			2000			
Panj Pani Plus	MS	PA	Panj Pani Communications				
Parvasi	MS	PA					
Peel Banner, The	BR	EN		1868			
Peel Banner and General Advertiser, The	BR	EN					
Peel Gazette, The	BR	EN					
Pinoy Showbiz	MS						
Port Credit Harbour Lights	MS	EN					
Port Credit News, The	TT	EN					
Portugal Illustrado	MS	PT	Manuel Neto			Bi-weekly	
Portuguese Post, The	MS	EN					
Project Times	MS	EN					
Punjabi Daily	MS	PA		c. 2008		Weekly	
Punjabi Star	MS		Punjab Star Inc.			Weekly	
Quamantry Pardesi	BR	PA				Monthly	
Ranjit Weekly	MS	HI					Online only, related to Ajit Weekly.
Sanjh Savera	BR		Hansra Enterprises Inc.			Weekly	
Scientific Wonders							
Shama	MS					Monthly	
SNAP Brampton	BR	EN	SNAP Newspaper Group Inc.	2009-07	-	Monthly	Franchised paper, focusing on event photos.
SNAP Caledon	CA	EN	SNAP Newspaper Group Inc.	2009-04	-	Monthly	Franchised paper, focusing on event photos.
SNAP North Mississauga	MS	EN	SNAP Newspaper Group Inc.	2009-04	-	Monthly	Franchised paper, focusing on event photos.
SNAP South Mississauga	MS	EN	SNAP Newspaper Group Inc.	2009-04	-	Monthly	Franchised paper, focusing on event photos.
South Asian Focus	BR	EN	North Peel Media Group (Metroland)				
South Asian Herald							
South Asian Insider	MS		Canadian Media Works			Weekly	
Streetsville Review, The	TT	EN					
Subras	MS	GU	Mihir Publication			Monthly	
Sunday Times Canada	MS	UR		c. 2003		Weekly	
The Pointer	MS	EN		c. 2018		Daily, online	
Teviskes Ziburiai	MS	LT	Ziburiai (Canadian Lithuanian) R.C. Cultural Society				Lithuanian community in Canada and Lithuania.
Times of India	MS	EN		c. 2002		Weekly	
Trade Talks	BR	EN	Brampton Board of Trade				
Urdu Khabarnama	MS	UR			c. 2000		Weekly
Urdu Post	MS	UR					
Urdu Times Canada	MS	UR	Urdu Times Group of Publications				
Watan Weekly	BR	PA	Watan Weekly Inc.	2004	-	Weekly	Weekly Punjabi Newspaper, Online www.watanweekly.com Also See Radio Watan.
Weekender, The							Indian/South Asian.
Weekly Hindi News, The	MS	HI	Sandeep Sharma	c. 2005		Weekly	
Weekly Leader Canada	MS	UR		c. 2007		Weekly	
Weekly Punjabi Awaaz, The			Weekly Voice			Weekly	
Weekly Times of India							Indian/South Asian.
Weekly Voice, The	MS	EN					Indian/South Asian.

Bonjour Ontario, L'Action De London-Sarnia and Le Rempart are published from Brampton, but do not relate to Peel.

=== Magazines ===
Sortable table
Name	City	Lang.	Ownership	First issue	Last issue	Frequency	Notes
Ambassador Magazine	MS	EN	Successfully Yours Publishing Inc.			Monthly	Possibly defunct.
Anokhi Magazine	MS	EN	Anokhi Media Corporation	2002		Quarterly	Formerly Anokhi Vibe, focuses on South Asian pop culture.
Bollywood Film Fame Canada Magazine	MS	EN	2006	Quarterly (Print) Monthly (Online)			
Brampton Living	CA	EN					
Caledon Living	CA	EN					
Canadian Educators' Press	MS	EN					
Canadian Family Physician	MS	EN					
Canadian Gaming News	MS	EN					
Canadian Homes & Cottages	MS	EN					
Chronicle of Healthcare Marketing	MS	EN					
Chronicles of Urology & Sexual Medicine	MS	EN					
Classical Music Magazine	MS	EN					
Comfort Life	MS	EN					
Coverings	CA	EN	W. I. Media				Floor covering industry publication.
Crystals							
Dermatology Times of Canada	MS	EN					
Ecopreneur	MS	EN					
Electrical Supply and Distribution Annual	MS	EN					
Equipment Journal	MS	EN					
Gardening News	MS	EN					
Graphic Monthly Canada	MS	EN					
Graphic Monthly Estimators' & Buyers' Guide	MS	EN					
Graphic Monthly Paper Finder's Guide	MS	EN					
Here in Brampton Magazine	BR	EN	Incre8mode Marketing Services			Quarterly	Mailed to residences. Showcases businesses in Brampton.
Management Magazine	MS						
Marcelle Magazine	MS						
Martial Arts Free Press	MS						
Masthead	MS						
Milk Producer, The	MS						
Modern Mississauga	MS	EN	Modern Mississauga Media Ltd.	2016		Bi-Monthly	Independently owned general interest digital and print magazine.
Motor Fleet Management	BR	EN					
MuscleMag	MS	EN					
Network Cabling	MS	EN					
Ontario Restaurant News	MS						
Our Kids Go To Camp	MS						
Our Kids Go To School	MS						
Outdoor Photography Canada	BR	EN	SunLight Media Inc.			Quarterly	
POP!	MS	EN	Mississauga Media Group (Metroland)				
Power Boating Canada	MS	EN					
Prepress Times	MS	EN					
Power Boating Canada	MS	EN					
Prepress Times	MS	EN					
Special Events & Travel	BR	EN					
The Spill Magazine	MS	EN					The Spill Magazine is a Mississauga-based online publication covering the independent music scene
Sweep! Curling's Magazine	MS	EN					
Today's Technology							
Trot Magazine	MS	EN					Horse-related magazine.
Urology Times of Canada	MS	EN					
Whoa!	MS	EN	Mississauga Media Group (Metroland)				
Wood Industry	CA	EN	W. I. Media				Regards making and marketing of wood products.
WORD Magazine	BA	EN					"Toronto's Urban Culture Magazine".
