= Media in Guelph =

This is a list of media outlets in Guelph, Ontario, Canada.

== Newspapers ==
=== Weeklies ===
- Guelph Mercury Tribune - twice-weekly community newspaper
- The Wellington Advertiser - distributed throughout Wellington County, but often includes Guelph-related news

=== Monthly ===
- Snap'd Guelph - monthly photo community newspaper

=== Online ===
- CaughtinGuelph.com - Daily online news and information site.
- GuelphToday.com - Daily online news site.

=== Student ===
- The Cannon - online newspaper serving the community at the University of Guelph
- The Ontarion - The University of Guelph's student newspaper, published weekly and distributed throughout the city

=== Regional dailies ===
- The Record - Kitchener-Waterloo newspaper that also covers Guelph and the area
- Toronto Star
- Toronto Sun

=== National dailies ===
- The Globe and Mail
- National Post

=== Former Newspapers ===
- Guelph Mercury - Guelph's daily newspaper
- Guelph Tribune

== Radio ==
- AM 1460 - CJOY, oldies
- FM 93.3 - CFRU, community and campus radio station based out of the University of Guelph
- FM 106.1 - CIMJ ("Magic 106.1 FM"), hot adult contemporary
- FM 101.1 - CICW ("The Grand @ 101"), adult contemporary

Guelph is also within the broadcast range of virtually all radio stations in the Kitchener-Waterloo market, as well as some from Hamilton.

On March 13, 2008, the Canadian Radio-television and Telecommunications Commission (CRTC) called for applications for a broadcasting licence to carry on a radio programming undertaking to serve the Guelph market. See also: On January 23, 2009, all applications to carry on a radio programming to serve the Guelph market were denied.

== Television ==
- Rogers TV Channel 20
- Kitchener's CKCO (CTV) also serves Guelph.

== City weblogs ==
- The Fountain Pen - Guelph's online newspaper
- Blog Guelph - photoblog and Soft Community News
- Guelph Politico - Coverage of City Council and Local News
