= Newspaper endorsements in the 2008 Canadian federal election =

This is a tally of newspaper and magazine endorsements in the 2008 Canadian federal election:

== Endorsing the Conservatives ==
- The Brampton Guardian
- Brantford Expositor
- Calgary Herald
- Calgary Sun
- The Daily Gleaner (Fredericton)
- The Economist
- Edmonton Journal
- Edmonton Sun
- The Gazette (Montreal)
- The Globe and Mail
- National Post
- Maclean's
- Ottawa Sun
- The Province (Vancouver)
- The Recorder and Times (Brockville)
- Toronto Sun
- Waterloo Region Record
- The Vancouver Sun
- Windsor Star
- Winnipeg Free Press
- Winnipeg Sun

== Endorsing the Liberals ==
- The Mississauga News
- Toronto Star
- The Ubyssey (U of BC)

== Endorsing the Bloc Québécois ==
- Le Devoir (Montreal)

== Endorsing the New Democratic Party ==
- Now (Toronto)

== Endorsing multiple parties ==
- Le Droit (National Capital Region)—recommends the NDP in Gatineau and Ottawa Centre, the BQ in Argenteuil-Papineau-Mirabel, the Conservatives in Pontiac, and the Liberals in Glengarry-Prescott-Russell, Ottawa-Vanier, Ottawa South, and Ottawa West-Nepean
- The Georgia Straight—recommends strategic voting for specific Liberal and NDP candidates in close races against the Conservatives.
- Guelph Mercury—recommends voting for Mike Nagy (Green, Guelph), Michael Chong (Conservative, Wellington-Halton Hills).
- Ottawa Citizen
- The Tyee (British Columbia)—also recommends strategic voting to defeat Conservatives.

== Explicitly endorsing no party ==
- The Hamilton Spectator
- La Presse (Montreal)
- Times & Transcript Moncton
- Victoria Times-Colonist
