= Cambridge Reporter =

Local newspaper in Southern Ontario

- Type: Daily newspaper (until 2002); Biweekly newspaper (after 2002)
- Owner(s): Torstar Corporation
- Founder(s): Peter Jaffray
- Founded: 1846 (as the Galt Reporter)
- Ceased publication: September 19, 2003
- Country: Canada
- ISSN: 0841-6281
- Website: thecambridgereporter.com

The Cambridge Reporter, previously the Galt Reporter, was a local daily newspaper in Southern Ontario serving the community of Cambridge, Ontario, Canada.

== History ==
The newspaper was founded in 1846 as the Galt Reporter by Peter Jaffray, a Scottish settler, originally from Stirlingshire, who immigrated to Galt in 1844. Before immigrating, Jaffray had worked at the Edinburgh printing and publishing firm of Oliver and Boyd, then worked for twenty-two years at the Shrewsbury Chronicle in Shrewsbury, England.

Jaffray founded the Reporter after resigning from a predecessor newspaper named the Dumfries Courier, which was the first newspaper published in Galt. James Ainslie was an early partner in the Reporter's publication, and for some time it was published out of a building he owned, which was at the corner of Main Street and Ainslie Street in Galt. Ainslie and Jaffray had a falling out over political content in the newspaper, however, and the partnership was dissolved; Ainslie followed the Reform movement, while Jaffray was "an unyielding and sturdy Conservative." Afterward, Ainslie founded his own rival weekly newspaper, the Dumfries Reformer, which was later purchased by James Young in 1853.

In 1973, the paper changed its name to the Cambridge Reporter after the city of Galt merged with the towns of Preston and Hespeler, and parts of the townships of Waterloo and North Dumfries, to form Cambridge.

In February 2002, the publication frequency was reduced from daily to twice-weekly.

In 2003 the Cambridge Reporter was closed by parent Torstar Corporation, with a final paper published on September 19, 2003. The Cambridge Reporter at the time was Canada's oldest operating newspaper.

Metroland Media Group, owned by Torstar, operates the Waterloo Region Record and the Cambridge Times, which has expanded since the closure of the Cambridge Reporter.

== Ownership ==
- Thomson - ?? to July 1995
- Hollinger/Southam - July 1995 to July 1998
- SunMedia - July 1998 to Jan 1999
- Quebecor - Jan 1999 to March 1999
- Torstar - March 1999 to September 2003

== Websites ==
A new online-only Cambridge Reporter was launched by Colin Carmichael in June 2008. Although it has the same name, the website is not affiliated with the original newspaper.

Shortly thereafter Torstar relaunched its own news portal. News stories are not original to that publication but instead come from other newspapers such as the Record and the Cambridge Times.
