= Elsie Gibbons =

Canadian politician (1903–2003)

Elsie May Gibbons (née Thacker; May 23, 1903 – January 28, 2003) was a Canadian Liberal Party later Progressive Conservative Party politician and businessperson who was the first woman to be elected mayor of a municipality in the Canadian province of Quebec. She was elected to serve as mayor of the small village of Portage-du-Fort from 1953 to 1971 and again between 1975 and 1977. Gibbons oversaw the construction of a waterworks system, paving of all roads and sidewalks in the village, renovation of several buildings, development of leisure and sport facilities, and organisation of law and fire services. An award to honor an elected female politician in Quebec for their work in municipal politics was named for her.

== Biography ==
=== Early life and career ===
On May 23, 1903, Gibbons was born Elsie May Thacker, in Ottawa, Ontario, and she was brought up in the small majority English-speaking village of Portage-du-Fort, which is on the Ottawa River and is 100 km (62 mi) west of Ottawa. She was the granddaughter of the English-born George Thacker, who emigrated from Sheffield to Portage-du-Fort in the 1860s. She was a member of the Anglican Church of Canada, and she married Gordon Gibbons on October 25, 1920, with whom she had a son born in 1936. The family sold milk to a local cheese family to earn an income and Gibbons was a writer for the local Ontario newspapers, the Pembroke Observer and the Renfrew Mercury. She also did sowing and working as a cook and maid for a successful Portage-du-Fort merchant. Following the burning down of their uninsured home, the Gibboneses sought one reliable income source to pay off their debts, and were employed to work on the Hiram Robinson steamship. Gibbons was paid $35 a month to work as a cook for eleven men and also knitted and did crochet on the steamship's upper deck.

The two opened a small grocery store in Portage-du-Fort during 1930. Following the expiration of their governmental contract, Gibbons remained in the business world. Her business received extra attention when from 1948 to 1953 around 1200 Ontario Hydro workers were constructing the Chenaux Generating Station and Dam close to Portage-du-Fort. The Gibboneses constructed an upstairs apartment, built a restaurant and employed another four girls for assistance in late 1948. She earned extra money by levying 25 cents for a cashed cheque to be cashed in at nearby Renfrew, Ontario from workers because Portage-du-Fort did not have a bank.

=== Mayoralty and later years ===
Gibbons accepted the offer to become mayor after she initially resisted persuasion from a large number of local citizens to do so. She was elected to the position for Portage-du-Fort by acclamation (and in absentia) on May 13, 1953, replacing a former six-year mayor. Gibbons was officially sworn in a week later. This made her the first woman to be elected mayor of a municipality in the province of Quebec. Gibbons was deemed to be in the best position to persuade the provincial authorities to supply water to Portage-du-Fort because she was in retail. She discovered that the town had funds of less than $30 to pay for outstanding bills and the multiple projects she thought would modernize the town. Gibbons' administration saw her persuade villagers to vote for a water distribution system notwithstanding it would put the village in debt since the government did not frequently funding infrastructure projects of that type during this period. She was able to get a hold of $15,000 from Raymond Thomas Johnston, the local Member of the Legislative Assembly for the Union Nationale party, to begin construction.

Gibbons received support from the local residents for her work. She also oversaw the construction of a waterworks system, had every road in the village paved, renovated sidewalks under a winter works program, renovated multiple buildings, developed leisure and sport facilities, organized a voluntary fire brigade, employed a fire chief, and law enforcement to the village during the weekends. She sold her store in 1956. Before her reelection to the mayoralty by acclamation because no other candidate ran against her before the closing of nominations in May 1957, Gibbons changed her federal political party allegiance from the Liberal Party of Canada to the Progressive Conservative Party of Canada. She also served as warden of Pontiac County (today the Pontiac Regional County Municipality) between March 1959 and 1961. Gibbons was also an Anglican church organist from 1955 onwards, served on the Order of the Eastern Star, the Rebekahs and the Western Quebec Economic Council. In February 1967, she was elected the first female delegate to represent the St. George Anglican parish church at that year's Ottawa general synod. Gibbons also directed a local aged home and she was a member of the Perpetual Care committee for the local Protestant community.

In November 1971, she was voted out of the office of mayor of Portage-du-Fort by a gap of seven ballots in an 104 to 97 vote in favour of her male opponent. Gibbons was elected as councillor in 1973 and was again elected mayor of Portage-du-Fort between 1975 and before leaving office in 1977. She was referred to the masculine title "Mayor of Portage-du-Fort, Mrs. Gordon Gibbons" from 1953 until it was changed to the feminine title "Lady Mayor, Elsie M. Gibbons" in 1959. Gibbons was the author and compiler of two albums focusing on her municipal political career and they are in the Pontiac Archives in Shawville, Quebec. On January 28, 2003, she died at Pontiac Community Hospital in Shawville. Her funeral took place on the afternoon of 30 January at St. George's Anglican Church, Portage-du-Fort and was buried at Portage du Fort Community Cemetery later in the year.

== Legacy ==
Maude-Emmanuelle Lambert in Gibbons' entry in The Canadian Encyclopedia wrote that the mayor "was a true pioneer in Québec politics" even though she had a mostly local political life. Lambert noted Gibbons "is increasingly mentioned in government literature on women in politics" when the number of women mayors increased over the years.

When the 75th anniversary of the women's suffrage in Quebec being passed came about, the Quebec government paid tribute to her in September 2015 at the 2015 Fédération des municipalités du Québec. The Fédération Québécoise des Municipalités created the Elsie-Gibbons Award in order to recognize women's work in municipal politics in March 2017. The accolade is awarded to an elected female individual "elected official whose commitment has fostered maintenance or progress with regard to the place of women in Quebec society and, in particular, within the municipal political sphere."
