= ECSU =

The abbreviation ECSU can refer to:

- Eastern Connecticut State University
- Elizabeth City State University
- Emmanuel College Students' Union
- Ethiopian Civil Service University
- University of Toronto Mississauga Students' Union, formerly known as the Erindale College Student Union (ECSU)
