= Cambridge Times =

Canadian newspaper

- Front page of the June 4, 2020 edition
- Type: Weekly newspaper
- City: Cambridge, Ontario
- Country: Canada
- Website: www.cambridgetimes.ca

The Cambridge Times is a local newspaper in Southern Ontario, Canada, serving the community of Cambridge. It replaced the Cambridge Reporter as the local paper in 2003, when the latter was closed by its publisher. The Times is published by the Metroland Media Group and owned by the Torstar Corporation.

== History ==
The Cambridge Times was founded in the mid-1980s as a twice a-week-community newspaper. The paper was later merged with the former daily Cambridge Reporter and has been published three times a week since the mid-1990s. It focuses on all local news. The Times has had five owners and eight publishers since its start.

== Present ==
Torstar bought the newspaper and its sister Fairway Group publications from Southam in 2004 and is now part of the Metroland Media Group which also includes regional sister daily newspaper the Waterloo Region Record (Kitchener, Cambridge and Waterloo) and the weekly Guelph Mercury Tribune, as well as several other weekly newspapers.

The Cambridge Times and the Record are both owned and published by Metroland Media Group but maintain separate newsrooms and operations.

== See also ==
- List of newspapers in Canada
