= CFRE =

The call sign CFRE may represent:

- CFRE-DT channel 11, a television station in Regina, Saskatchewan, Canada
- CKC455 91.9 FM, a radio station in Mississauga, Ontario, Canada that unofficially uses "CFRE" as its branding
- The post-nominal letters may represent a Certified Fund Raising Executive referring to a nonprofit development officer.
