= Stouffville Sun-Tribune =

Newspaper in Stouffville, Ontario, Canada

- Masthead of the 38th issue of the Tribune, published Nov. 1888
- Type: Weekly newspaper
- Founder: A. J. Hoidge
- Founded: 1888
- City: Stouffville, Ontario
- ISSN: 0839-4156
- Website: www.yorkregion.com/whitchurchstouffville-on/

The Stouffville Sun-Tribune is a local, weekly newspaper covering Stouffville, Ontario. It has a circulation of 14,000.

== History ==
=== 1800s ===
The Stouffville Tribune was started in February 1888, the earliest known proprietors being William Malloy and R. Keffer. Prior to that it had been the Pay Advocate under Thomas Shaw and Thomas Walker, then the Alert under H. Pemberton. It was changed to the Advance until 1888, when A. J. Hoidge renamed it the Tribune. Harry Hodge published the paper until Keffer and Malloy entered the picture. Malloy was born in 1842 in Vaughan Township and married in 1868. Before entering the publishing business Malloy spent time as a teacher in Port Rowan, Beamsville and Streetsville, as well as five years at the St. Catharines Collegiate Institute. After a short stint as a Methodist missionary and nearly a decade on a fruit farm in Forest, Ontario, he arrived in Stouffville in December 1889. Malloy was connected with J. Wideman, editor of the Alert, who contracted him for instruction of writing, bookkeeping and elocution for the Stouffville Library while Malloy was heading the Tribune. Malloy would continue as editor with his son Howard until 1922, retired but still involved with the paper until his death on March 17, 1928.

Stouffville Tribune office

=== 1900s ===
In 1922, Arthur Victor Nolan took over the paper until his death in 1950. A. V. was born in Uxbridge, Ontario County in 1888. Prior to Stouffville, he owned and edited the Uxbridge Times, Uxbridge Journal and the Barrie Advance. A. V. was a Justice of the peace for 10 years, Reeve of Stouffville at the time of his death, and a member of the York County Committee for Reforestation as well as the Bruce County Publisher’s Association. Upon his death his son Charles Henry Nolan assumed control of the paper, having joined the staff in 1936. C. H. was born in Uxbridge in 1915, moved to Stouffville in 1921, and married Innis Williamson in 1941. C. H. was a member of the Lion’s Club, was heavily responsible for the establishing of the local arena, met Pope John in 1956, and was awarded a Canada Medal in 1967. During Charles Henry’s tenure he would be president of Ontario Weekly Newspaper Association in 1953, and in 1964 National President of the Canadian Community Newspaper Association. During the C. H.’s steering, the paper thrived and was so awarded, winning five provincial awards in one year, 25 over a thirty-year span, including its first in 1939, the Joseph Clark Memorial Trophy for best all-around newspaper. Charles would run the paper until retiring in 1981, passing away February 11, 1992. Before C. H.’s retirement, the paper became part of the Inland Publishing Company, after having been purchased by the Toronto Telegram, and soon after was acquired by Metrospan, forerunner of the Metroland Printing company. The newspaper's offices were moved to 6258 Main St. in 1925 until 1970s.

The paper historically served the communities of Goodwood, Victoria Square, Uxbridge, Glasgow, Ballantrae, Bethesda, Bloomington, Mongolia, Altona, Church Hill, Lemonville, Ringwood, Gormley, Elmira, Peaches, Melville, Dickson Hill, Vandorf, Audley, Greenwood, Cherrywood, Green River, and Stouffville.

=== 2000s ===
A number of publishers would follow, including Barrie Wallace, Bruce Annan, Patricia Pappas, Deborah Kelly and Ian Proudfoot. The paper continues to publish today as the Sun-Tribune, having merged with the Stouffville Sun and its first official edition published on March 20, 2003 with a twice-weekly frequency as asked for by a reader survey. Their offices were relocated to 6290 Main St. by 2016, but is now situated at 34 Civic Ave. The paper is part of the Metroland Media Group.

== Mentions of notable persons ==
World War I air ace Captain Arthur Roy Brown, first credited with shooting down Manfred von Richthofen, the "Red Baron", wrote a movie review for 1927's Wings, a war aviation film which won the first Academy Award for Best Picture.

Jane Philpott was featured in a 2005 front-page interview during her time as a physician while working with HIV/AIDS patients in Africa. Philpott represented the riding of Markham—Stouffville in the House of Commons in 2015, before she resigned from her cabinet position as President of the Treasury Board over the SNC-Lavalin affair.
