= The Georgetown Herald =

- “The Voice of Halton Hills since 1866”
- Type: Weekly newspaper
- Owners: Robert D. Warren (1886–1909); Joseph M. Moore (1909–1939); Walter Biehn (1940–1958); Thomson Corporation (1959–1992)
- Founder: Isaac Hunter
- Founded: May 3, 1866
- Ceased publication: February 19, 1992

The Georgetown Herald was a weekly newspaper published in Georgetown, Ontario, from 1866 to 1992.

== History ==
Isaac Hunter (Note: The son of John Hunter, Postmaster of nearby Ashgrove.) established the newspaper as the Halton Herald in 1866, with the financial backing of William Barber, after dissolving his 18 month partnership with Robert Matheson (the two having worked on The Canadian Champion and County of Halton Intelligencer in Milton, Ontario). This was not an amicable split, with the Herald attacking the Reform politics of the Champion in its early days, until Barber stepped in. Isaac had launched the paper as one aligned with Colonel George King Chisholm and the Conservatives. (Note: The son of William Chisholm, Oakville’s founder and its first mayor. In 1854, the Colonel had been elected to the seat for County of Halton in the 5th Parliament of the Province of Canada.)

It would become the Georgetown Herald in 1877.

It was not the first newspaper founded in Georgetown and not without its own share of troubles. During the first three decades, the paper passed through a number of different owners, including Mr. Hunter until 1869, Joseph & Richard Craig, Nelson Burns (1871), and Thomas Starret (1874).

The paper’s acquisition in 1886 by Robert D. Warren saw it move to share a building with the Georgetown branch of the Bank of Hamilton. Warren had been born near Acton in 1863, and was an active member of the Baptist denomination. Before his career as a publisher he had been a schoolteacher. During his life he served as Warden of Halton County and Reeve for Georgetown. He also operated the Herald Steam Printing House, which opened in 1888. Warren bought out the Halton Conservator, which had run from 1901 until 1906.

Joseph M. Moore, who had apprenticed under H.P. Moore of The Acton Free Press, became foreman in 1891, and became a joint owner with Warren in 1909.

In April 1918, the Herald building caught fire, which gutted the offices and destroyed its records and presses, the press itself crashing through the top floor into the basement. Thanks to their connection to the Acton Free Press and editor Henry P. Moore they did not miss an issue.

Moore was later the sole owner, until his passing in 1939. His estate sold the newspaper to Walter Biehn in March 1940. His wife Mary ran the business while Walter fought in the Second World War. Walter also found time to be a town councillor, Chairman of Georgetown Board of Education, and Lions Club member. He sold the Herald to the Thomson Corporation in December 1958, and continued to be its publisher until 1973.

In November 1973, just before the formation of the new Town of Halton Hills, the name was changed to The Herald.

The paper closed in February 1992. After 125 years of serving the Halton Hills communities, the Thomson chain cited “poor financial result and limited prospect for improvement” for closing it.

== See also ==
- List of newspapers in Canada
