= Richmond Hill Liberal =

- Type: Weekly newspaper
- Founded: 1878
- City: Richmond Hill, Ontario
- Website: https://www.therecord.com/local-richmond-hill/home.html

The Richmond Hill Liberal is a Canadian newspaper based in Richmond Hill, Ontario and servicing Richmond Hill and surrounding communities since 1878 as a weekly local newspaper. It usually gives full coverage to all local council meetings.

== History ==
The paper was founded in 1878 after the Conservative York Herald (the town's only paper) attacked the more progressive Richmond Hill council.

Thomas F. McMahon purchased the newspaper in 1884, and was the editor until his death in 1925. James H. Ormiston was a later editor.

Richmond Hill LIberal printed its last paper version on September 14, 2023 after its parent company, Metroland Media Group, entered bankruptcy protection and transitioned the paper into digital-only.
