= Northumberland News =

- Type: Weekly newspaper
- Owner: Metroland Media Group Ltd.
- Publisher: Dana Robbins
- Editor: Mike Johnston
- Founded: 1991
- Language: English
- Headquarters: Cobourg, Ontario, Canada
- Circulation: 20,000
- OCLC number: 889232053
- Website: https://www.northumberlandnews.com

The Northumberland News is a local newspaper that serves Northumberland County, Ontario. It includes the town of Cobourg, the municipality of Port Hope, and the townships of Alnwick/Haldimand, Cramahe and Hamilton. It was founded in 1991 and is owned by Metroland Media Group a subsidiary of Torstar. The headquarters are in Cobourg, Ontario. It publishes every Thursday with a circulation of 22,800. In addition to its print publication, it also maintains an online presence with a website, a Twitter account, a Youtube account and a Facebook page.

== History ==
The Northumberland News is the last surviving newspaper in Cobourg, where the newspaper industry is the oldest industry still in existence in the town. The first newspaper, the Cobourg Star, was founded by R.D. Chatterton on January 11, 1831. The Northumberland News was founded in 1991.

Until November 2017, there were multiple newspapers operating in Cobourg and Port Hope, Ontario. PostMedia owned the Northumberland Today, and Torstar owned the Northumberland News. On November 27, 2017, PostMedia and Torstar announced that they were exchanging a collection of newspapers and shutting down most of the company's newspapers. As a result of the PostMedia-Torstar newspaper exchange, the Northumberland Today was immediately shut down, making the Northumberland News the only remaining local newspaper serving the area.

== Coverage ==
The Northumberland News has several sections including local news, sports, business, community events, obituaries, opinion and real estate. Most of the news coverage focuses on events that take place in Northumberland County. In addition, there are advertisements throughout the newspaper for cars, houses, technology and local businesses. The newspaper also publishes articles from other publications owned by the same parent company, Torstar, particularly when reporting on events pertaining to other localities. For example, in the November 22 publication, the front page article was a regional article written by Saira Peesker, a journalist for Metroland Media.

There are approximately eight staff members who work for the Northumberland News. Peter Dounoukos is the sales manager; he oversees newspaper and online advertising, flyer sales, and magazines and speciality products.

== Awards ==
In 2014, Northumberland News reporters Paul J. Rellinger and Jennifer O'Meara's piece, "An ill wind blows", won second place in the "Best Environmental Writing" category of the Canadian Community Newspaper Awards (CCNAwards) for newspapers with a circulation of 10,000 and over. Photographer Karen Longwell also won second place in the "Best Spot News Photo Coverage" category for newspapers with a circulation of 12,500 and over.

In 2015, Northumberland News won third place in the category of "Best Photo Illustration" of the CCNAwards.

In 2016, Northumberland News won second place in the "Best Editorial Page" category of the CCNAwards for newspapers with a circulation between 12,500 and 24,999. Karen Longwell's photo, "Online crime", won second place in the "Best News Feature Photo" category of the CCNAwards for newspapers with a circulation above 12,500.

In 2017, Todd McEwen's July 14, 2016 article titled "Accused killer told to stay away from parents" won third place in the "Best News Story" category of the CCNAwards for newspapers with a circulation above 12,500.

== See also ==
- List of newspapers in Canada
- Metroland Media Group
- Northumberland County, Ontario
- Newspapers published in Canada
- Newspapers published in Ontario
- Weekly newspapers published in Ontario
