= The Medium (University of Toronto Mississauga) =

Campus student newspaper of the University of Toronto Mississauga

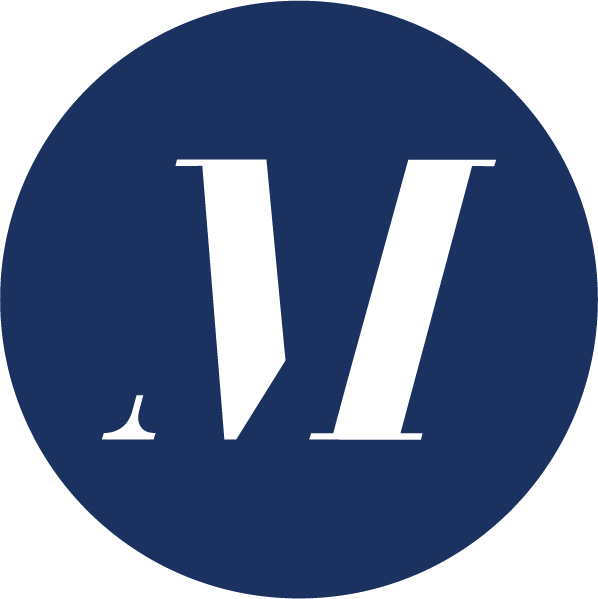

- Front page of the November 25, 2024, edition of The Medium
- Type: Weekly student newspaper
- Format: Compact
- School: University of Toronto Mississauga
- Owner: Medium II Publications
- Editor: Elizabeth Provost
- Founded: 1974
- Language: English
- Headquarters: 3359 Mississauga Rd N Student Centre rm 200; Mississauga, ON L5L 1C6
- Country: Canada
- Circulation: 3,000
- Website: themedium.ca

The Medium is the independent student newspaper of the University of Toronto Mississauga (UTM), a campus of the University of Toronto in Mississauga, Ontario, Canada. It has been in publication since 1974, when it was founded following the collapse of The Erindalian, the original campus newspaper. It primarily covers UTM news, in addition to University of Toronto tri-campus and Ontario news and opinion pieces.

The Medium is published by Medium II Publications, a non-profit Ontario corporation founded in 1986 in the wake of disagreements with the University of Toronto Mississauga Students' Union (UTMSU). It is funded partly by a student levy and partly through advertising sales. The corporation has also published Medium Magazine nearly annually since 2010, and run a blog division since 2013.

== History ==
In the spring of 1974, The Erindalian, then the student newspaper of the University of Toronto's Erindale College, which had been established less than a decade prior, collapsed due to a lack of funding . A student named Greg Troy, enrolled under the pseudonym Gregg-Michael Troy, founded what was then called medium II along with a number of friends. The first issue was published as a proposal to the student council for funding, with a cover story on the murder of Constance Dickey on Erindale Campus. They were awarded funding and proceeded to publish throughout the academic year. Towards the end of the year, Troy resigned during a successful campaign for the presidency of the student council, and Harry Vredenberg took his place.

Early editor-in-chief Bruce Dowbiggin's conflicts with ECSU, the student union by then established in place of the council, was representative of tensions that would arise for decades to follow. These tensions culminated in the 1986 incorporation that separated the publisher from the union's umbrage. A board and constitution were established, and all equipment was bought from the union for the nominal fee of $1.

In 1995, medium II changed its name to The Medium; the incorporated name is still Medium II Publications. In 2000, the first website was established. In 2010, Medium editors began to publish the annual Medium Magazine, a higher-quality print publication made up of long-form features. In 2013, the corporation created positions for blog editors with the responsibility of creating a secondary stream of informal, online-only content. In 2014, a video editor position was added, followed by a managing editor in 2015.

== Masthead ==
The Medium is published in five sections: News, Opinion, Arts, Features, and Sports. Each section has an editor in charge, with the exception of Opinion, which is managed by the editor-in-chief. A photography editor, design editor, advertising manager, distribution manager, webmaster, and copy editor make up the remaining part of the staff, along with the more recent and experimental blog, online, and video editors.

Most of the positions are elected annually, mainly those in charge of content; the rest are hired from the student population. Most of the writers are volunteers, and can earn the title of staff writer or associate editor while writing. Bookkeeping is handled externally.

== Operations ==
In keeping with its constitution and the Ontario requirements for non-profit corporations, Medium II Publications holds an annual audit and annual general meeting. It also holds the occasional writing and photography contest.

The corporation is considered a student society in the university's taxonomy for the purpose of distributing the student levy, whose conditions include financial record-keeping, an audit, and constitutionality. The content does not involve any administrative oversight, although a university liaison holds a non-voting seat on the board of directors. The board's remaining positions are made up five elected students, the elected editor-in-chief, and a non-voting appointed ex-officio seat.

== Notable past editors and staff ==
- Greg Troy, created Medium II and was first Editor-in-Chief. He is a novelist and screenplay writer.
- Harrie Vredenburg, leading scholar in the 'areas of competitive strategy, innovation, sustainable development and corporate governance in global energy and natural resource industries and is Professor of Strategy and Suncor Chair in Strategy and Sustainability at the University of Calgary's Haskayne School of Business.'
- Neil Sherman, talented writer who wrote the column Peabody.
- Larry Cooper, CPA, highly respected accountant & author of Red to Black CFO.
- Bruce Dowbiggin, Canadian sports broadcaster, journalist and writer of many best-selling books.
- Sandy Mowat, producer of many CBC Radio shows. He is also the son of Farley Mowat who was a 'Canadian writer and environmentalist.' His works were 'translated into 52 languages, and he sold more than 17 million books.'
- H.E. Robert Sabga, High Commissioner for Trinidad and Tobago
- Duncan Koerber, business communication professor at Brock University
- Robert Price, writing professor at UTM
- Richie Mehta, filmmaker
- Zaib Shaikh, Director of film and entertainment City of Toronto, actor
- Ali Taha, Analyst, Innovation & Intrapreneurship at SpyderWorks Inc.

== See also ==
- CKC455
- The Varsity (newspaper)
- The Gargoyle (newspaper)
- List of student newspapers in Canada
- Media in the Regional Municipality of Peel
