= The Canadian Champion =

Former newspaper in Milton, Ontario, Canada

- Type: Biweekly (from November 1988)
- Format: Tabloid (from December 1987)
- Owners: James A. Campbell (1861–1864); Robert Matheson and Isaac Hunter (1864–1866); Robert Matheson (1866–1869); John D. Matheson (1869–1874); George Wilson (1874–1880); William Panton and John Rixon (1880–1882); William Panton and David Watson Campbell (1882–1896); William Panton (1896–1927); John W. Blight and F. Leonard White (1927–1943); G. Arlof Dills (1943–1954); Dills Printing and Publishing Co. Ltd. (1954–1978); Inland Publishing Co. Ltd. (1978–1981); Metroland Printing and Publishing Co. Ltd. (1981–)
- Founder: James A. Campbell
- Founded: May 1860
- Ceased publication: September 14, 2023
- City: Milton, Ontario
- Website: Official website insidehalton.com

The Canadian Champion was a locally distributed community newspaper in Milton, Ontario, Canada. It was published biweekly by Metroland Media Group. Publication of the paper version ceased with the September 14, 2023 edition along with multiple other community newspapers published by Metroland Media Group, while publication of news stories on the website continues.

== History ==
It was founded as The Canadian Champion and County of Halton Intelligencer in 1861 by James A. Campbell, (Note: The earliest editions of the Champion date from 1862, and are at the Archives of Ontario) (Note: Said to have been May 1860 in the Champion centennial edition in 1960, more recent research suggests that it had actually been founded in 1854 in Georgetown, Ontario, taken over in 1856, and subsequently re-established in Milton in 1861.) and it was known for its outspoken political views. In 1862, it declared:

"Our continual aim will be to make our paper a true exponent of sound Reform principles, to cripple extravagance in all departmental affairs and sue for the initiation of a just and economical system of disbursing the public revenue and the proper disposing of the patronage of the State; we shall consequently work vigilantly for the purpose of overthrowing the present corrupt administration (Note: at that time led by the joint premiers George-Étienne Cartier and John A. Macdonald) whose every act has been at variance with these views."

Campbell sold the newspaper in 1864 to Robert Matheson and Isaac Hunter. (Note: The son of John Hunter, Postmaster of nearby Ashgrove.) Hunter would leave in 1866 to found the Halton Herald in Georgetown, Ontario. (Note: Later renamed the Georgetown Herald, Hunter established it with the financial backing of William Barber. This was not an amicable split, with the Herald attacking the Reform politics of the Champion in its early days, until Barber stepped in. Isaac had launched the paper as one aligned with Colonel George King Chisholm and the Conservatives.) From 1869 to 1882, the paper would see a succession of owners, until settling with the partnership of William Panton and David Watson Campbell. That would last until Campbell's sudden death in 1896. Panton would continue as sole publisher until he sold the Champion to John W. Blight and F. Leonard White in 1927.

After Blight's death, the Champion was sold to G. Arlof Dills, publisher of The Acton Free Press, in November 1943. Dills stated, "It will be our aim to make the two papers as distinct as the needs of the two communities."

The Champion would remain in the ownership of the Dills family until 1978, when it would be sold to Inland Publishing, (Note: a subsidiary of the Toronto Telegram, and its president, Douglas Bassett, would appear on the front page of the Champion to mark the occasion) which would later merge with Metrospan Community Newspapers (Note: a subsidiary of Torstar Corporation) in 1981 to form Metroland.

== Other Milton newspapers ==
The Champion was not the only newspaper covering Milton events. The Halton Journal had already begun in 1855, but there is no record of when it ceased publication. The Halton New Era was published in the early 1860s, and the Halton News ran for a short time from 1877. The Milton Reformer was the most successful competitor, being published from 1885 to 1932, until selling its subscription list to the Champion.
