= Brock Citizen =

- Front page of the May 28, 2020 edition
- Type: Weekly newspaper
- Format: Tabloid
- Owner: Metroland Media Group (Torstar)
- Publisher: Dana Robbins
- Editor: Marcus Tully
- Founded: 1996
- Headquarters: 3D Cameron St. East Cannington, Ontario, Canada
- Circulation: 5,600
- Price: Free
- Website: www.mykawartha.com

The Brock Citizen is a weekly community newspaper in Cannington, Ontario, Canada, that was established in 1996 combining the Beaverton Express, the Cannington Gleamer and Sunderland Sun. It is one of three newspapers in the Kawartha Division of Metroland Media Group, a subsidiary of Torstar which publishes newspapers across Ontario. It has a circulation reaching 5,600 homes.

In 2020, its online presence merged with the Uxbridge Times-Journal. Metroland folded the printed edition in September 2023.

Old issues of the Brock Citizen ranging from 1996 to 2000 are available at the Cannington Public Library. Some issues are available on microfilm as well.

== See also ==
- List of newspapers in Canada
