= The Sachem =

- Front page of the December 26, 2019 edition
- Owner(s): Metroland Media Group
- Founded: 1853
- City: Caledonia, Ontario
- Country: Canada
- Website: www.sachem.ca

The Sachem, formerly known as the Grand River Sachem, is the oldest newspaper in Haldimand and Norfolk counties, Ontario.

== History ==
The paper was started in 1853 as the Cayuga Sachem by Thomas Messenger. Messenger sold the Sachem and moved his press to Caledonia, Ontario in 1856. He started a new publication called The Caledonia Advertiser. Later that year, the Cayuga Sachem moved to Dunnville, Ontario and changed its name, so Messenger renamed his Caledonia publication to the Grand River Sachem. In 1865, after a devastating fire, the Sachem moved to a new building where it is still published today. The Sachem was a paid-circulation weekly for many years, switching to free distribution in 2004 after its purchase by Metroland Media Group from owner/publisher Neil Dring.

== See also ==
- List of newspapers in Canada
