= The Bramptonian =

The Bramptonian was a short-lived Brampton, Ontario newspaper created 1984. The husband and wife team John and Judi McLeod founded the newspaper to rival The Brampton Times.

A free weekly with initial distribution of 40,000, it first published in late March 1984. The Audit Bureau of Circulation says the paid circulation of the Times was 6000 in September 1983, down from 7700 a year before. It was staffed by three former Times employees and "a handful of journalism students."

== Pre-history of the paper ==
A reporter since age 20, the 38-year-old Judi McLeod was a municipal affairs reporter for two years, before being transferred to the family section. McLeod suggests this was due to pressure from unhappy politicians. Judi McLeod received a Western Ontario Newspaper Award for her political coverage.

Publisher Victor Mlodecki and Judi disputed the transferral; her husband backed her, as the paper's managing editor. Both were soon fired, after she continued to write political stories. John McLeod had separately raised ire by cancelling a meeting between newspaper staff and Ontario Premier William Davis, MPP for Brampton, and writing an editorial urging Davis not to become involved in municipal elections.

The McLeods sued The Brampton Times for wrongful dismissal. They wrote at The Toronto Sun the next year, for a few months before the new paper's first publishing.

The first issue of was published a year to the day after the dismal, they told the Globe this was coincidental. "We're not there out of revenge or to get back at the politicians who ran us out of town. We're there to put out a decent, independent community newspaper."
