= The Acton Free Press =

Former weekly newspaper in Ontario, Canada

- The front page of the March 13, 1958 edition of The Acton Free Press
- Format: Broadsheet
- Owners: Joseph H. Hacking (1875–1877); T. Albert Moore and S.W. Galbraith (1877–1878); T. Albert Moore and H.P. Moore (1878–1879); H.P. Moore (1879–1922); H.P. Moore and G. Arlof Dills (1922–1927); G. Arlof Dills (1927–1954); Dills Printing and Publishing Co. Ltd. (1954–1978); Inland Publishing Co. Ltd. (1978–1981); Metroland Printing and Publishing Co. Ltd. (1981–1984) (closing)
- Founder: Joseph H. Hacking
- Founded: July 2, 1875
- Ceased publication: December 26, 1984
- Sister newspapers: The Canadian Champion (Milton); The Georgetown Independent

The Acton Free Press was a weekly newspaper in Acton, Ontario, published from 1875 to 1984. The paper historically served the communities of Acton and Rockwood, and the surrounding townships of Esquesing, Nassagaweya, Eramosa and Erin.

== History ==
After having published weekly newspapers in Listowel and then in Guelph over the course of several years, Joseph H. Hacking set out to establish The Acton Free Press in July 1875. On the front page of the first edition, he declared:

"...we propose the FREE PRESS shall not be devoted to the interest of any political party or faction; that it shall at all times, and under all circumstances, be free to discuss matters of public policy on their merits..."

Hacking would later sell the Free Press to T. Albert Moore (Note: who would in time become the 5th Moderator of the United Church of Canada (1932–1934)) and S.W. Galbraith in 1878, in order to concentrate on his job printing business in Guelph. Galbraith would leave the following year to become a reporter at the Montreal Evening Post, (Note: Galbraith would leave that position shortly thereafter to become the editor of the Sunday Democrat in Flint, Michigan, and he later left to return to Ontario to purchase and run the Wingham Times.) and Moore would then enter into partnership with his brother H.P. Moore.

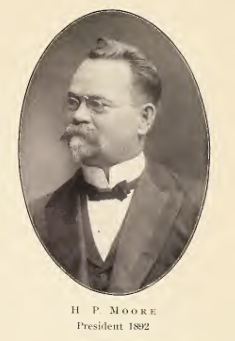
H.P. Moore, upon election as President of the Canadian Press Association (1892)

The Moore partnership would dissolve in June 1879, with H.P. Moore becoming the sole proprietor. An editorial in the following week's issue would note:

"In politics we continue neutral, and shall not be devoted to any political party or faction, but shall at all times and under all circumstances free to discuss matters of public interest on their merits. The field being so efficiently and capably filled by the metropolitan journals, wherein party politics is a specialty and wherein every faculty is afforded for fulfilling their mission, the village paper may well remain content to let them do the heavy work of the craft. It seems to us the village newspaper can devote its energies to better advantage by giving attention to matters of local import—affairs to which the community can feel an interest."

H.P. Moore would own the Free Press for many years, and became a well-respected member of the community. He was also an influential member of the Methodist Church, and was instrumental in helping to achieve the later formation of the United Church of Canada. He would enter into partnership with G. Arlof Dills in 1922, and Dills would become sole proprietor in 1927.

=== Journalistic reputation ===
Its reputation as a high-quality newspaper was well known, both in respect to reporting and technical achievement. H.P. Moore himself was selected by his peers to become President of the Canadian Press Association in 1892.

It acquired the first Linotype machine in Halton County in 1917, which was still working and used in 1966. That capability would prove useful in April 1918, when the Georgetown Herald building caught fire, gutting the offices and destroying its records and presses, with the press itself crashing through the top floor into the basement. The Free Press stepped in to take over the layout and printing, ensuring that the Herald did not miss an issue.

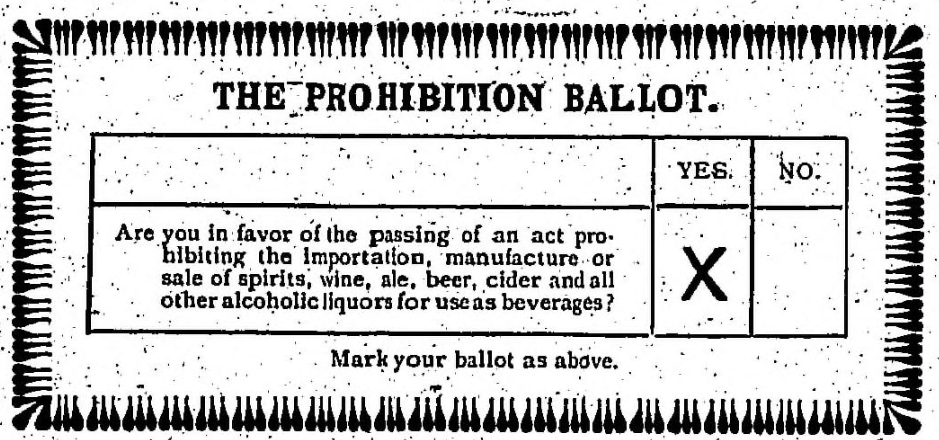
1898 prohibition ballot (September 22, 1898)

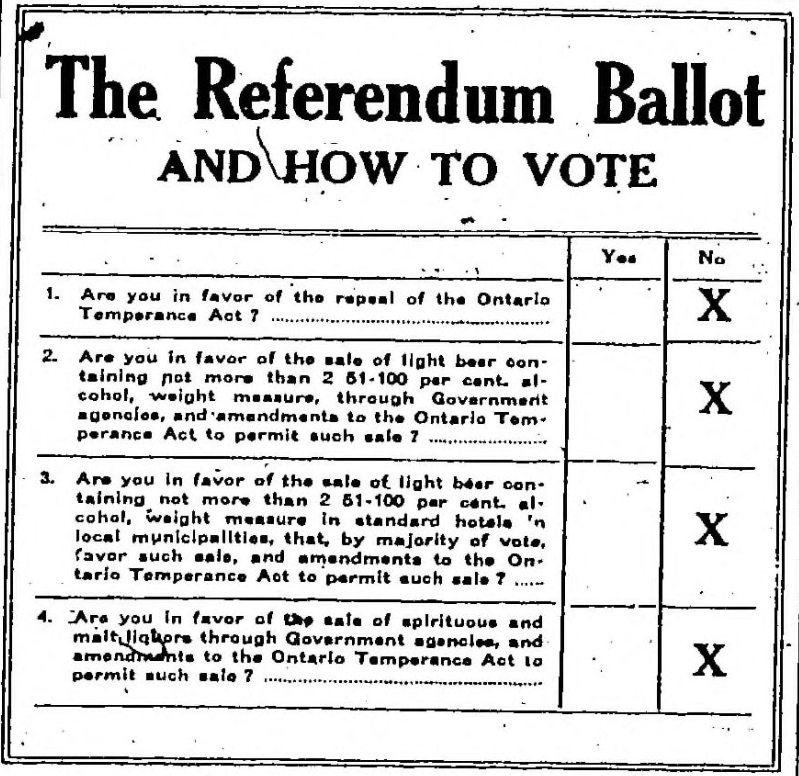
1919 Ontario referendum (October 16, 1919)

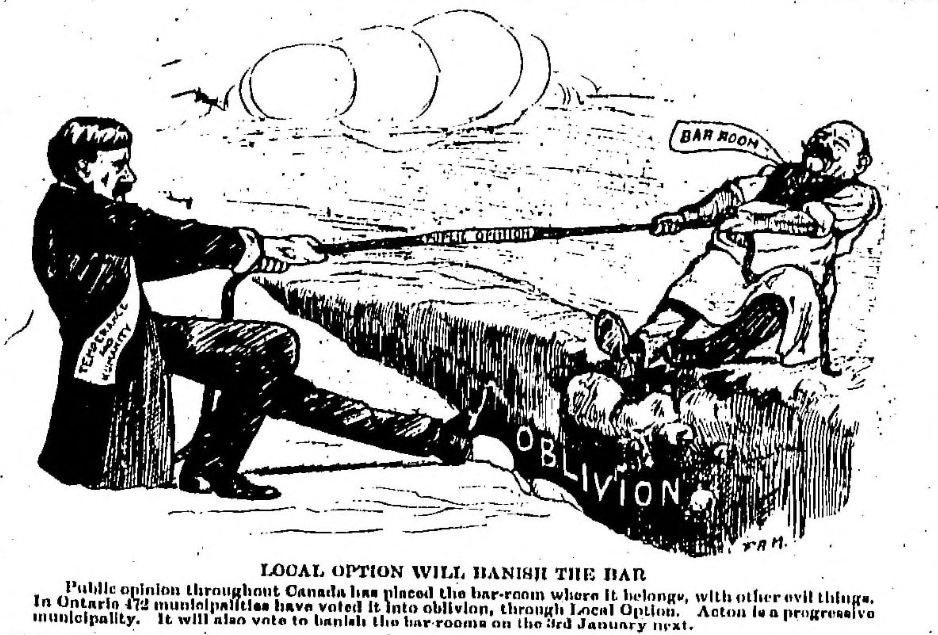
Cartoon representing struggle between prohibition and the barroom, from the prohibitionist's view (December 2, 1909)

The Free Press had a reputation for supporting the temperance movement, as shown in pre-filled ballots for the 1898 Canadian prohibition plebiscite and 1919 Ontario prohibition referendum as well as a cartoon used in an eventually successful 1910 local option campaign, that appeared on its front pages.

In later decades, it would take a more disinterested stance, saying that "we feel the electorate is knowledgeable enough about the issues to decide for themselves".

In 1931, the Toronto Globe observed:

"The Acton Free Press has entered upon its fifty-seventh year of publication. Despite its maturity, it is keen and eager, and energetic in its many duties of reflecting the life of its community. The Free Press has been an example to others in its fine typographical appearance, and in its latest issue it makes fitting protest against the growth of sensationalism in some of the current daily newspapers."

This would continue in future years. In December 1966, the printing plant was converted to offset printing with the installation of a Goss web offset press.

=== Later years ===
The Free Press would remain in the ownership of the Dills family until 1978, when it would be sold to Inland Publishing. (Note: a subsidiary of the Toronto Telegram, and its president, Douglas Bassett, would appear on the front page of the Free Press to mark the occasion) Inland would be merged with Metrospan Community Newspapers (Note: a subsidiary of Torstar Corporation) in 1981 to form Metroland. The newspaper ran until the end of 1984, and has since merged with the Georgetown Independent to form the Independent & Free Press.
