= Endorsements from individuals and organizations in the 2015 Canadian federal election =

The following is a page of endorsements from prominent individuals and organisations made during the 42nd Canadian federal election.

== Conservative Party of Canada ==
- Wayne Gretzky - Former NHL athlete, called Harper "an unreal prime minister," and meant it as a compliment. Gretzky also said Harper has been "Wonderful to all the country"
- Brian Mulroney - The former Progressive Conservative has referred to NDP leader Tom Mulcair as "the best opposition leader since Diefenbaker," and Justin Trudeau as "likeable," but has ultimately praised the economic record of Stephen Harper and predicted a Conservative victory
- Campaign Life Coalition - A socially conservative lobby group has supported the Conservatives and criticised both the NDP and Liberals for supporting abortion, same-sex marriage, and transgender rights.
- Jeb Bush - The Republican presidential candidate and former Governor of Florida announced in May 2015 that it would be "great if Canada re-elected Stephen Harper".
- Wildrose Party - Alberta's right of centre official opposition has thrown its support behind the federal Conservatives
- Rob Ford - The controversial former, right of centre Mayor of Toronto has endorsed the Conservatives. He predicted a Conservative minority, but hopes for a majority. He has also predicted that either a Liberal or NDP government will be a "disaster," or "Ontario under Bob Rae all over again".
- Doug Ford - Former Toronto city councillor and Toronto mayoral candidate, has endorsed Stephen Harper like his brother.
- Stockwell Day - The former leader of the Canadian Alliance, retired Conservative MP and former cabinet minister has campaigned on behalf of various Conservative candidates in his native British Columbia.
- Ric McIver - The former member of the Calgary City Council and current interim leader of the Progressive Conservative Association of Alberta has expressed his support for the Conservative Party and Stephen Harper.
- Tasha Kheiriddin - The conservative columnist and reporter endorsed the Conservatives in an op-ed for the National Post.
- Darrell Pasloski - The Yukon Premier endorsed Conservative candidate Ryan Leef.

== New Democratic Party ==
- College of Family Physicians of Canada - The professional association awarded the NDP "12 points," compared to 5 for the Liberals and 0 for the Conservatives, calling the NDP platform one that showcases "firm and thoughtful commitments"
- Pembina Institute - The environmental think tank stated that they "applaud the NDP’s commitment to science-based emissions reduction targets for the medium and long term. These targets are much more ambitious than Canada’s current pledge. They would help ensure that Canada does its fair share to prevent the most dangerous impacts of climate change."
- FRAPRU - The Montreal-based, housing advocacy group gave both the NDP and Bloc Quebecois top marks for their policies on subsidised housing. However, overall they stated that the campaign has been a disappointing one as the issue of housing has been marginalised.
- Canadian Arab Federation, Canadian Muslim Forum, Egyptian Canadian Coalition for Democracy, and Muslim Political Engagement Group - A group of Muslim and Arab organizations corresponded with the party leaders with a group of demands which included abolishing Bills C-24 and C-51 and changing Canada's foreign affairs to promote human rights worldwide, and based on the responses from the party leaders, as well as the track record of each party over the past years, they stated in a joint statement that "The NDP appears to be the party that will best serve Canada and the Canadian people"
- Canadian Centre for Policy Alternatives - The progressive think tank gave the NDP platform an A, the Liberals a B, the Greens a B− and the Conservatives an F.
- Joel Plaskett - The Juno Award winning Canadian singer endorsed Tom Mulcair for prime minister, listing the NDP's opposition to Bill C51 and its promise to hold an inquiry into murdered and missing Aboriginal women
- Leslie Feist - The Canadian singer has also endorsed the NDP and has canvassed for New Democrat Toronto MP Andrew Cash
- Ed Robertson - The singer from the Canadian band the Barenaked Ladies has released two videos endorsing both NDP leader Tom Mulcair and Toronto candidate Jennifer Hollett. In this video endorsing Mulcair, Robertson urges Canadians to vote with their hearts (meaning the NDP). In the video endorsing Jen Hollett, Robertson speaks of the need for a fresh perspective, youth and female energy in the House of Commons and that Hollett represents all of those things.
- Donald Sutherland - The Canadian actor and former son-in-law of the NDP founder and father of medicare, Tommy Douglas, slammed Stephen Harper's record and urged Canadians to elect the NDP.
- Sarah Silverman - The US actress praised NDP leader Tom Mulcair for standing up to Islamophobia and racism, and endorsed NDP candidate Mira Oreck
- Steve Patterson - The host of the CBC comedy talk show, The Debaters wrote an open letter explaining why he voted NDP. He cited Tom Mulcair's consistent opposition to Bill C51 and the unelected Senate, his promise to run balanced budgets, support for peacekeeping and his middle-class background. He also cited his local MP, Peggy Nash, as another reason. The comedian criticised Liberal leader Justin Trudeau for categorically refusing to work with the NDP, supporting Bill C51 and supporting a fiscal agenda that to him is reminiscent of the "fiscally irresponsible" Ontario Liberals.
- Ed Broadbent - The former NDP leader has also lent his support to the 2015 NDP campaign
- Paul Watson - The Canadian environmental activist expressed his ideological sympathy with Green Party leader Elizabeth May, but has ultimately endorsed NDP leader Tom Mulcair
- Ontario Federation of Labour - The Ontario labour group has rejected strategic voting and is actively campaigning for the NDP. The OFL has argued that only the federal NDP has a plan that will address unaffordable childcare costs, precarious retirement and the growth of precarious jobs.
- Rachel Notley - The NDP Premier of Alberta has stated that Tom Mulcair would make a great prime minister and expressed support for the NDP climate change plan
- Mike Harcourt - Despite breaking with the provincial British Columbia NDP, the former NDP premier has thrown his support behind Tom Mulcair and campaigned for the NDP leader in BC.
- Roy Romanow - The former Saskatchewan NDP premier has also announced that he supports the federal NDP
- Howard Hampton - The former leader of the Ontario NDP has been advising Tom Mulcair on policies related to mining in Northern Ontario. Hampton is the federal NDP candidate in the riding of Kenora.
- Mike Layton - The son of the late NDP leader, Jack Layton and the Toronto city councillor has thrown his support behind Mulcair.
- David Kilgour - The former Liberal cabinet minister is supporting the NDP in this election.
- Mel Hurtig - the Canadian nationalist activist, Canadian historian, author and former founding leader of the left-wing National Party of Canada has been "visceral" in his opposition to Prime Minister Harper and has said the following of the two main opposition leaders: he has little faith in Justin Trudeau, whom he finds "incredibly unimpressive," but great faith in NDP Leader Thomas Mulcair, whom he believes has outperformed all leaders in the Commons and has been "forceful, policy-oriented and articulate."
- Alexa McDonough - The former leader of the federal NDP and Nova Scotia NDP has been campaigning for the party in this election
- John Horgan - The British Columbia New Democratic Party leader has campaigned for federal NDP candidates.
- Andrea Horwath - The leader of the Ontario NDP has campaigned with NDP leader Tom Mulcair and has supported the federal party on numerous issues.
- James Orbinski - The former President of Doctors without Borders has endorsed New Democrat MP Craig Scott
- 20 artists and academics, including Daniel Marc Weinstock, Martine Delvaux, Pascal Dufour, and Charles Taylor (philosopher), endorsed the NDP in an article published in Le Devoir. They cited the NDP's ambitious childcare plan, its national carbon reduction targets, plans to increase corporate taxes and opposition to Bill C-51 as making it a more progressive option than Justin Trudeau's Liberals. They also expressed disappointment with Bloc Quebecois leader Gilles Duceppe for having joined Harper's divisive attack on the niqab.
- Maureen MacDonald - The interim leader of the Nova Scotia New Democratic Party appeared at an election rally with Mulcair.
- Stephen Lewis - The former leader of the Ontario New Democratic Party and Permanent Representative of Canada to the United Nations has lent his support to federal NDP candidates.
- Canadian Union of Public Employees - CUPE have run numerous articles in support of the NDP platform, dedicated a portion of their site to profiles on Tom Mulcair, criticism of the Liberal platform as well as the Conservative government.
- Gordon Pinsent, Leah Pinsent, and Peter Keleghan - The three actors endorsed the NDP in an official television ad released by the party. Gordon Pinsent was also present during the announcement of the NDP's arts and culture platform.
- Sarah Harmer - The singer appeared during the NDP's arts and culture platform announcement and has tweeted support for Tom Mulcair. However, she has also suggested strategic voting in some ridings. Harmer also appeared in an NDP advertisement.
- Assembly of First Nations - The AFN gave the NDP platform full marks for addressing First Nations issues. The Liberals were identified as prioritizing five of the six categories laid out by the AFN and the Green Party four. On the areas where the Liberal and Green Party platforms were not considered comprehensive, they were identified as providing a partial or incomplete response. The Conservatives were identified as providing two incomplete responses and four inadequate or missing responses. AFN clarified that the document did not constitute a personal endorsement from the organization's leader Perry Bellegarde.
- FTQ (Fédération des travailleurs et travailleuses du Québec) - Largest labour union in Quebec officially endorsed the NDP after years of supporting the Bloc. FTQ officials have advised that strategic voting should be considered where it will defeat the Conservative Party.
- British Columbia Federation of Labour - The organization endorsed the NDP and added that strategic voting should exclude the Liberals due to the party's support for a number of Conservative policies. The endorsement was also published by The Tyee and attributed to the organization's president Irene Lanzinger.
- Andrew Coyne - The former National Post editor of Editorials and Comments resigned his position over the decision from management to stop him from publishing a column with a different endorsement than the paper's. In a series of tweets, Coyne indicated he would vote for his local NDP candidate because the Conservatives did not deserve to govern and because he did not think the Liberals deserved a majority.

== Liberal Party of Canada ==
- Jean Chrétien - The former Liberal prime minister appeared at a rally early in the campaign with Liberal leader Justin Trudeau and attacked the then first place NDP
- Paul Martin - Another former Liberal prime minister appeared at another rally early in the campaign with Trudeau and attacked the then first place NDP
- John Turner - The former Prime Minister has appeared with Liberal candidates.
- Kathleen Wynne - The Liberal Premier of Ontario has also campaigned for Justin Trudeau and publicly attacked both Prime Minister Stephen Harper and NDP leader Thomas Mulcair Some non-partisan pundits were critical of the Ontario premier's overly partisan rhetoric, particularly her attacks against the NDP
- Hazel McCallion - The former Mayor of Mississauga has endorsed the Liberal plan for deficit induced infrastructure spending. McCallion also appeared in advertisements for the Liberal Party.
- Chantal Kreviazuk - The Juno Award winning Canadian singer announced in 2014 that she was "proudly supporting Justin Trudeau"
- Conrad Black - Former business magnate, convicted fraudster and member of the British House of Lords, Conrad Black slammed aspects of the NDP's platform and wrote in an editorial that Justin Trudeau "may be ready" and that he has "earned his chance."
- Brian Gallant - The Liberal Premier of New Brunswick has also thrown his support behind Liberal leader Justin Trudeau
- Dimitri Soudas - The former top advisor to Prime Minister Harper announced that he was joining the Liberals in support of his wife, former MP Eve Adams (who subsequently lost a Liberal nomination). Adams had been barred from seeking nomination as a Conservative candidate following allegations of bullying and abuse of power. Trudeau's decision to embrace the couple was not without controversy.
- Joseph Boyden - Scotiabank Giller Prize winning author endorsed Trudeau.
- Seventeen former Conservative and Progressive Conservative elected officials and members including Roy McMurtry, Dave Clark, and Rex Barnes endorsed Trudeau in a letter released by the Liberal Party.
- Stephen McNeil - Liberal Premier of Nova Scotia introduced Trudeau at an election rally in Halifax.
- Adam Van Koeverden - The Olympic medalist sprint kayaker introduced Trudeau at a rally in Brampton and has canvassed for Liberal candidates in Toronto.
- Bob Rae - The Former Ontario NDP leader, Premier of Ontario, and interim Leader of the Liberal Party of Canada stated in an interview that "I happen to think that it is important to respect the realities of economic life, and I think Mr. Trudeau, frankly, is doing that more effectively than the other leaders."
- Rana Bokhari - The leader of the Manitoba Liberal Party has campaigned for a number of federal Liberal candidates.
- Dwight Ball - The leader of the Liberal Party of Newfoundland and Labrador appeared at an election rally in St. John's with Trudeau.
- Margaret Trudeau - The mother of Liberal leader Justin Trudeau has canvassed with Notre-Dame-de-Grâce—Westmount candidate Marc Garneau.
- Sheila Copps - The former Deputy Prime Minister of Canada lent her support to federal Liberal candidates in the Hamilton area. In voicing support for Trudeau, she attacked the Conservative campaign saying, ""I’ve never seen public servants wearing a niqab. It’s all part of his (Stephen Harper's) strategy. He knows how to get his vote out. He is trying to appeal to the baser side of Canadian values which is demagoguery versus democracy."
- David Swann - The leader of the Alberta Liberal Party has canvassed with federal Liberal candidates in Calgary.
- Stephen Bronfman - Member of the famed Canadian Jewish Bronfman family endorsed Trudeau and Anthony Housefather.
- Dona Cadman - The former Conservative MP for Surrey North endorsed the Liberal candidate for Surrey Centre, Randeep Sarai. "At this point," she said, "I feel change is needed to move our country forward. To date, Justin Trudeau and the Liberal Party have stayed incredibly positive in their campaign messaging. A country is well served if the right people are given the right opportunity at the right time."
- Zach Churchill - The Nova Scotia Liberal MLA for Yarmouth has lent support to federal Liberal candidates.
- Several Ontario Liberal MPPs have lent support to federal Liberal candidates, including Michael Coteau (MPP for Don Valley East) and Mitzie Hunter (MPP for Scarborough—Guildwood).
- Phil Fontaine - The former AFN Chief endorsed Liberal Party candidate for Central Okanagan-Similkameen-Nicola Karly Scott.
- Lloyd Axworthy - The Chrétien-era minister and former MP for Winnipeg South Centre is running a Liberal campaign in the Winnipeg area. He has criticized the Conservative response to the Syrian refugee crisis.
- Anne McLellan - The former Deputy Prime Minister and MP for Edmonton Centre has canvassed for federal Liberal candidates.
- John Cleese - The British actor and member of Monty Python tweeted his support for Justin Trudeau.
- Josh Matlow - The Toronto City Councillor has endorsed Eglinton—Lawrence Liberal candidate Marco Mendicino.
- Jon Gerrard - The former leader of the Manitoba Liberal Party and current MLA for River Heights has lent support to federal Liberal candidates.
- Barbara Hall - The former Mayor of Toronto has endorsed Toronto Centre federal Liberal candidate Bill Morneau.
- Wab Kinew - The noted journalist, musician, and author endorsed Vancouver Granville federal Liberal candidate Jody Wilson-Raybould.
- Rob Baker - Guitarist and member of the Tragically Hip endorsed Trudeau and the Liberals.
- Ed the Sock - Canadian TV personality

== Bloc Québécois ==
- Pierre Karl Peladeau - After calling the party "irrelevant," Parti Québécois leader Pierre Karl Péladeau has offered what some in the media have referred to as "tepid" support
- Several PQ MNAs including Bernard Drainville, Stéphane Bergeron, Maka Kotto, Dave Turcotte and Agnès Maltais have endorsed the Bloc and campaigned for local candidates.
- Bernard Landry - Former Premier of Quebec and former leader of the Parti Québécois
- Sol Zanetti - Leader of Option Nationale
- FRAPRU - The Montreal-based, housing advocacy group gave both the NDP and Bloc Quebecois top marks for their policies on subsidised housing. However, overall they stated that the campaign has been a disappointing one as the issue of housing has been marginalised.

== Green Party of Canada ==
- Adriane Carr - The former leader of the Green Party of British Columbia, leader of the Green Party of Vancouver, and member of the Vancouver City Council has campaigned for federal Green candidates.
- Peter Bevan-Baker - The Green Party of Prince Edward Island leader and MLA for Kellys Cross-Cumberland has supported federal Green candidates and appeared with Elizabeth May.
- David Coon - The leader of the Green Party of New Brunswick and MLA for Fredericton South has campaigned with federal Green candidates.

== Refused to endorse any party ==
- Brad Wall - The Premier of Saskatchewan and leader of the centre-right Saskatchewan Party has stated he "isn't ready to throw his support behind a party yet". On the economy he is seen as being closer to Stephen Harper, but he does agree with NDP leader Tom Mulcair on the issue of Senate abolition
- Christy Clark - the Premier of British Columbia has declined to endorse any party and has vowed to work with the new government regardless of who leads it. Her BC Liberal party is a centre-right party supported roughly equally by federal Liberal and Conservative supporters. Clark stated she "would stay out of federal issues until at least the election is over."
- Philippe Couillard - the Liberal Premier of Quebec has also avoided endorsing a particular federal party. He has requested information on policies of interest to Quebec from the Harper, Mulcair, and Trudeau.
- Danny Williams - the former Progressive Conservative Premier of Newfoundland and Labrador has not endorsed either the NDP or Liberals but has been adamant that Stephen Harper cannot be trusted.
- Paul Davis - The current Progressive Conservative Premier of Newfoundland and Labrador has stated that he "cannot trust" Conservative Prime Minister Stephen Harper after alleging that the federal government backed away from a fisheries fund deal with the province. He has not expressed a particular preference for either the NDP or Liberals. He has also stated his belief that Newfoundland would benefit from having a representative from each of the three major parties in the 42nd Canadian Parliament and indicated he would not lead an anyone but Conservative campaign like his predecessor Danny Williams.
- Perry Bellegarde - The Chief of the Assembly of First Nations has urged First Nations in Canada to vote without specifically endorsing a political party. Bellegarde identified the NDP platform as comprehensive, but added that he respects all party leaders who listen to First Nation concerns.
- Joe Clark - The former Progressive Conservative Prime Minister of Canada has made positive remarks regarding both NDP leader Tom Mulcair and Liberal leader Justin Trudeau. He has been critical of Conservative Prime Minister Stephen Harper.
- Naheed Nenshi - The centre-left Mayor of Calgary has condemned what he calls the Conservative Party's scapegoating of Muslims and has praised both NDP leader Tom Mulcair and Liberal leader Justin Trudeau for rejecting it. He has met with both Mulcair and Trudeau on numerous occasions, but has not endorsed either.
- John Tory - The centrist/centre-right Mayor of Toronto has refused to endorse any of the main parties citing a need to work with whoever wins on October 19. He has met with all three leaders on different occasions.
- Patrick Brown - The leader of the Progressive Conservative Party of Ontario and a former federal Conservative MP has stated that he will not be campaigning for the federal Conservatives during the campaign. He has also criticised Liberal premier Kathleen Wynne for allegedly focusing more on the federal campaign than her job as Ontario premier. He has insinuated that she is using the campaign to shield herself from awkward questions about cuts and higher energy prices.
- Wade MacLauchlan - The Liberal Premier of Prince Edward Island endorsed his local Liberal candidate but declined to campaign for the federal party noting "I feel that the premier of Prince Edward Island and, for that matter, our province collectively, must be ready to work with whoever forms government after Oct. 19, and as we can see, there are a lot of different scenarios that could emerge."
- Don Iveson - The Mayor of Edmonton declined to endorse a specific party noting "It’s not my role to tell anyone who to vote for…but I’m going to suggest what to vote for. Vote for cities…But, above all else, make sure you vote."
- Gregor Robertson - The Mayor of Vancouver and former BC NDP MLA has voiced support for the Liberal Party's transit policy, while declining to endorse a particular party. Robertson also suggested voters who care about urban issues should not vote for the Conservative Party.
- Brian Bowman - The Mayor of Winnipeg expressed pleasure at the level of attention municipal issues were receiving in the federal campaign while observing "Ultimately, Winnipeggers will make up their own mind who deserves to serve as the next government and prime minister. We're going to be prepared to work with whomever Canadians elect."
- Denis Coderre - The former federal Liberal MP and current Mayor of Montreal presented a 'shopping list' of policies to the party leaders and asked to meet them one on one. Coderre declined to endorse a specific party while noting his approval of the Liberal and NDP position against tolls on the Champlain Bridge. Corderre later indicated Montreal voters should not vote for the Conservative Party.
- Jim Watson - The former Ontario Liberal MPP and current Mayor of Ottawa chastised area Tory candidates for skipping an upcoming debate on issues of local concern. He otherwise declined to endorse a party.
- David Suzuki - The environmental activist, scientist and documentarian had been approached by Justin Trudeau for an endorsement of his environmental platform. Suzuki reportedly argued with Trudeau over his support for pipelines, the exchange became heated and Suzuki called the Liberal leader a "twerp". However, the scientist has endorsed New Democrat candidate Linda McQuaig stating that "Parliament is in desperate need of people who speak out in a straightforward, no bullshit manner. Linda McQuaig is such a person." He also endorsed Liberal candidate Jody Wilson-Raybould suggesting "She is the kind of candidate for office who should be elected."
- Mohamed Fahmy - The recently freed Egyptian-Canadian journalist felt "betrayed and abandoned" by the Harper Government while imprisoned in Egypt. He met with Justin Trudeau and Tom Mulcair but noted "I’m a journalist; I cannot endorse anyone. One of the things I was concerned about in my own case was the magnitude of the overlap between journalism and politics and I don’t want this to be repeated."'
- Alison Redford - The former Premier of Alberta and leader of the Progressive Conservative Association of Alberta endorsed 'change' while noting this didn't mean she was opposed to the federal Conservative government observing, "You have to be open to new ideas. We’ve certainly seen some of that from the federal government in the last couple of years. We’ve seen a lot of change from the other party leaders as well."
- Régis Labeaume - The Mayor of Quebec City presented a list of local requests to all the major parties. Although he declined to endorse a party, he did note the Conservative response was the 'most complete.'
- Greg Selinger - The Leader of the Manitoba NDP and Premier of Manitoba met with federal NDP leader Tom Mulcair, but did not openly endorse the federal party thanks to the provincial government's unpopularity.
- Bob McLeod - The Nonpartisan Premier of the Northwest Territories sent a letter to the major party leaders asking for details on their policies which were of interest to the Northwest Territories. McLeod's brother Michael was subsequently elected as a Liberal MP for the Northwest Territories riding.

== Strategic voting ==
Some organisations and individuals have endorsed strategic voting, these include

- LeadNow - The group ran a campaign called Vote Together encouraging voters in "swing ridings", where the Conservative incumbent only won with a narrow margin in the 2011 election, to vote for the Liberal or NDP candidate most likely to defeat the Conservative candidate.
- Unifor - Canada's largest labour union has endorsed all NDP incumbents, but has urged progressive voters to pick the opposition candidate with the "best chance of defeating the Conservatives". Union leader Jeremy Dias added that Unifor has a "strong relationship with the federal NDP" and will actively support the "re-election of all incumbent New Democrat MPs". That could be interpreted as somewhere in between an endorsement of the NDP and an endorsement of strategic voting.
- Margaret Atwood - The renowned author endorsed strategic voting to defeat the Conservatives: "I support whoever, in their riding, can defeat a Conservative. It can be a Liberal; it can be the NDP. We have three main political parties, so we’re very conscious of vote-splitting. Last time, the incumbent [Conservative] government got voted in by 39 percent of the vote."
- Mark Jaccard - Professor of Environmental economics at Simon Fraser University endorsed strategic voting to defeat Stephen Harper.

== See also ==
- Newspaper endorsements in the Canadian federal election, 2015
