= Judi McLeod =

Canadian journalist

Judi Ann T. McLeod (born 1944) is a Canadian journalist. Formerly a reporter for a series of newspapers in Ontario, she now operates the conservative website, Canada Free Press (CFP).

== Early life and career ==
McLeod was born in Prince Edward Island and raised in St. Joseph's Orphanage in Halifax, Nova Scotia. Her first article was published in the Halifax Chronicle-Herald when she was 18.

== Career ==
McLeod met her future husband, John, when she was a young reporter for the Oshawa Times where he was the managing editor. He had spent ten years with the Ottawa Journal, and when he was hired by the Brampton Times, he suggested that the paper also hire his wife, who was then working for a Toronto public-relations firm. She became city hall reporter for the Brampton Times in 1981.

When she was removed from her beat in 1983, she alleged that the Progressive Conservatives she had accused of meddling in local politics had put pressure on the newspaper. When her husband reinstated her to the position, the newspaper fired them both. The Globe and Mail reported that Canada's multiculturalism minister, Liberal MP James Fleming, was investigating McLeod's removal. Fleming believed the reassignment amounted to intimidation of a reporter doing her job. The Ontario Federation of Labour protested on McLeod's behalf against what they called political intervention. Days after being fired, McLeod won the Edward J. Hayes Memorial Ontario award for beat-reporting. Broadcast journalist and panelist Peter Desbarats called her coverage the best of any in 22 Ontario dailies. The McLeods subsequently filed a lawsuit against The Brampton Times for wrongful dismissal, but later withdrew it. Judi McLeod also filed a complaint with the Ontario Human Rights Commission against the Brampton Times.

The work she created in her final year at the Times won the beat category, at the Western Ontario Newspaper Award.

She and her husband founded The Bramptonian, a short-lived local newspaper covering Brampton, in 1984

They were brought to the Toronto Sun in 1985, where she was the paper's education reporter and he worked for the business section. Her columns were highly critical of New Democratic Party school trustees who sat on the Toronto Board of Education at the time. McLeod also called ethnic parents who wanted heritage language instruction "as diabolical as any of the characters from the imaginative pen of Charles Dickens... a nasty lot indeed," warned people against "multiculturalism gone haywire", and opposed the board's decision to organize a conference for students on apartheid in South Africa. Described as a "journalistic pit bull" in her years at education reporter for the Toronto Sun, McLeod was described by The Globe and Mail as having "influence among the bureaucrats who run Toronto schools from The Education Centre on College Street."

After being fired from the Sun, she moved to Kingston, Ontario for three years where she worked as a reporter and columnist for the Kingston Whig-Standard.

== Our Toronto Free Press and Canada Free Press ==
In 1991, she returned to Toronto and founded, with help from then-city councillor Tony O'Donohue, Our Toronto, a free monthly newspaper that printed and distributed 100,000 copies. Our Toronto Free Press, which as a free-distribution monthly newspaper with a right-wing stance, and which originally focussed on municipal politics and local issues. It was funded by advertising and from McLeod's personal savings; it was published out of her "modest" apartment.

Reporting on the Ontario Coalition Against Poverty, in a 1999 article in Toronto Eye magazine entitled, Portrait of a Poverty Pimp, McLeod accused the leadership of the Ontario Coalition Against Poverty of exploiting the homeless for the purpose of advancing a radical Marxist agenda, and was herself accused of "Red-baiting, misrepresentations, and badmouthing."

In the 2000s, Our Toronto Free Press evolved into the Canada Free Press, which is now published online only. The Free Press has been described as "an online conservative tabloid."

== See also ==
- Steven Crowder
- Ezra Levant
- Gavin McInnes
- Mark Steyn
