= The Brampton Times =

Newspaper published in Ontario, Canada

The Brampton Times is a newspaper that was published in Brampton, Ontario, Canada until the early 1990s, when The Brampton Guardian’s free distribution eroded the Times subscription base.

Judi McLeod worked for the Times as a city-hall reporter; her 1983 firing by the paper was controversial. The Ontario Federation of Labour protested on McLeod's behalf against what they called political intervention.
