= Guelph Mercury =

Defunct Canadian daily newspaper

- Type: Daily newspaper
- Format: Broadsheet
- Owner: Metroland Media Group (Torstar Corporation)
- Founded: 1853, as Wellington Mercury
- Ceased publication: January 29, 2016
- Circulation: 12,863 weekdays 13,028 Saturdays in 2010
- Website: guelphmercury.com

The Guelph Mercury was an English language daily newspaper published in Guelph, Ontario, Canada. It published a mix of community, national and international news and is owned by the Torstar Corporation. The newspaper, in many incarnations, was a part of the community since 1854. It was one of the oldest broadsheet newspapers in Ontario. Publication was discontinued in late January 2016.

== History ==
The Wellington Mercury was founded in 1853, and published weekly by owner George Keeling.

A competing paper was started in 1854, named the Guelph Advertiser. It was published weekly as well.

In 1862, Toronto newspaperman and MP James Innes took over the editorship of the Guelph Advertiser and shortly thereafter formed a partnership with John McLagan, owner of the competing weekly newspaper the Guelph Mercury.

The two papers merged to form the Mercury and Advertiser. The Mercury was expanded into a daily newspaper in 1867. Among its editors was the future best-selling novelist Thomas B. Costain who worked there from 1908 to 1910. The Guelph Mercury has since had numerous owners. Innes sold his share in the newspaper in 1905 to J. Innes McIntosh, who also bought the Guelph Herald, a competing daily newspaper, in 1924. McIntosh then sold his share in 1929 to James Playfair, who sold the paper in the late 1940s to Thomson Newspapers. Thomson remained owner for half a century, until Hollinger Inc. purchased the paper in 1995. Sun Media purchased the paper in 1998 and then resold it to Torstar.

The Guelph Mercury was then published six days a week by Metroland Media Group, a subsidiary of Torstar Corporation. The newspaper also published a free weekly roundup for some time as well as various other special publications. A magazine, Guelph Life, was cancelled as a cost-cutting measure in 2009 but restored in 2015; it continued after the Guelph Mercury ceased publication in early 2016. The Mercury was one of few Metroland newspapers still to have their own presses since the Mercury's sister paper, the Waterloo Region Record, is printed at another Torstar site, The Hamilton Spectator in Hamilton, Ontario. In February 2009, Torstar announced layoffs across the chain, including 13 newsroom staff at the Guelph Mercury. According to the announcement, copy editing and page production of the paper will be transferred to the Waterloo Region Record, reducing the editorial staff of the paper to two managers and eight reporter–photographers. Both the Guelph Tribune and Guelph Mercury are owned and published by Metroland Media Group but keep separate newsrooms and operations. The Guelph Mercury's Goss Urbanite Press was shut down on February 7, 2014, at which time printing moved to the Hamilton Spectator.

== Publication discontinued ==
On January 25, 2016, Metroland Media Group announced that the Guelph Mercury would publish its final issue on January 29, 2016, citing a difficulty in remaining profitable because of declining circulation (9,000 subscriptions at that time) and difficulty obtaining national advertising. All of the staff were laid off. At the time of the announcement, there was an indication that some content would continue to be published on the newspaper's web site. Metroland Media Group confirmed that it would continue publishing news and "unique local content" through its twice-weekly Guelph Tribune which is distributed free of charge. As well, the Mercury's real estate section, Guelph and District Homes, would continue to be printed and distributed.

By April 2016, the Guelph Tribune had increased its coverage of local news and rebranded with a new title, Guelph Mercury Tribune. At the same time, the Guelph Mercury Tribune started using the website www.guelphmercury.com as its main location for online local news, information and advertising.

== See also ==
- List of newspapers in Canada
