= Burlington Post =

Former newspaper in Ontario, Canada

- Type: Local newspaper
- Format: Tabloid
- Owner(s): Torstar, The Halton Media Group, Metroland Media Group Ltd
- Publisher: Kelly Montague
- Editor-in-chief: Regional Managing Editor: Catherine O'Hara
- Editor: Managing Editor: Karen Miceli
- Language: English
- Headquarters: 901 Guelph Line, Burlington, Ontario, L7R 3N8
- Circulation: 50,000 homes Wednesday & Friday, 60,000 homes & apartments on Thursday (until 2023)
- Price: Free
- ISSN: 0832-2341
- Website: Official website insidehalton.com

The Burlington Post is a local newspaper in Burlington, Ontario, Canada. Owned by Metroland Media Group, it now publishes print editions and exists as a part of the digital news publication InsideHalton.com as of 2023, alongside The Canadian Champion and Oakville Beaver.

The paper covered local news and issues, as well as sports, entertainment, the arts, business, and classified sections.

The Post was distributed once a week, on Thursdays, through home delivery and is also sold in local stores and in newspaper boxes.

== See also ==
- List of newspapers in Canada
