= CKC455 =

Online radio station of the University of Toronto Mississauga

- Mississauga, Ontario; Canada
- Frequency: 91.9 MHz (formerly)
- Branding: CFRE Radio

Programming
- Format: Campus radio

Ownership
- Owner: Student-run

History
- First air date: 1970
- Call sign meaning: Canada's First Radio Erindale

Technical information
- ERP: 0.3 W

Links
- Website: cfreradio.ca

CKC455, branded on-air as CFRE, is an online radio station, formerly broadcasting at 91.9 FM in Mississauga, Ontario, Canada. It is the campus radio station of the University of Toronto Mississauga (UTM), established in 1970 by its second principal John Tuzo Wilson. The station's initials are derived from Canada's First Radio Erindale (originally Canada Free Radio Erindale) and refer to Erindale College, the original name of UTM.

CFRE's first broadcast was from Colman Place, and the station moved to the North Building. It eventually moved the Student Centre in 1999; CFRE is still based there today. For a brief period, the station was branded as VIBE Radio; however, the name reverted to CFRE Radio in 2004.

The station focuses on Canadian rock, alternative, hip hop, heavy metal, jazz, folk and world music. The station sometimes conducts interviews with bands; notable bands interviewed include Fall Out Boy, Lady Sovereign, Moneen, and Bedouin Soundclash.

CFRE is a student-run organization and levy group funded by the University of Toronto Mississauga Students' Union (UTMSU).

Notable people involved with CFRE include journalist John Roberts and musician Joel Gibb.

== See also ==
- CIUT-FM
- List of campus radio stations in Canada
- List of radio stations in Ontario
- Media in the Regional Municipality of Peel
- The Medium (University of Toronto Mississauga)
