= Renfrew Mercury =

- Cover of an issue of the Renfrew Mercury.
- Type: Weekly newspaper
- Owner(s): Ottawa Region Media Group, a division of Metroland Media Group (Torstar)
- Publisher: Dana Robbins
- Editor: Sherry Haaima
- Founded: 1871
- Language: English
- Headquarters: 35 Opeongo Rd, Renfrew ON, K7V 2T2
- Circulation: 15,330
- Sister newspapers: Multiple, through Ottawa Region Media Group
- Website: www.insideottawavalley.com

One of publisher Metroland Media's oldest newspapers, the weekly Renfrew Mercury was first published in 1871.

== History ==
Until 1919, the paper was owned by W. E. Smallfield and Sons.

According to the Ottawa Citizen, Smallfield's greatest contribution to Renfrew was his local history book. Presbyterian minister Reverend Doctor Robert Campbell and Smallfield collaborated on a series of history articles, carrying on alone after Campbell died in 1907. Campbell's work up until 1919, covering the period up to the turn of the century, was published as The Story of Renfrew. He died of ill health in 1926, his son carried on until his death in 1928; William Smallfield Jr's section ends mid-sentence.

=== Davies ownership (1919–1925) ===
Upon hearing the Mercury was for sale in May 1919, William Rupert Davies took a train to investigate. Despite considering the price for the building and business steep, he said he took it as a test of his "business ability"; he would double its value in the six years he operated it. The Davies family found the community much rougher, isolated, and divided than their previous home of Thamesville, Ontario. Young Robertson Davies, later a prominent Canadian author of fiction, said in interviews that he grew up expecting the unexpected, with a "sense of ordinary people, extraordinary lives", thanks to his father's position. At the age of nine he was paid for a contribution published in the Mercury; a review of a lecture on Shakespeare at the local Methodist Church. Davies apparently knew upon being paid that he wanted to be a professional writer. Older Davies sons Fred and Arthur were given reporter and machinery jobs for the publication. Robertson found himself "terribly oppressed" in the town, basing the childhood adversity of Francis Cornish in What's Bred in the Bone on Renfrew and its people. Davies' two older sons, Arthur and Fred, were assigned machinery and reporting jobs. Robertson's first article was at age 9, published February 16, 1923.

Soon after, W. R. Davies purchased the Renfrew Journal newspaper (established 1866) from W. D. Samson. The April 27 issue was its final, and the printing offices disposed of the offices.

=== Sayles ownership ===
Davies sold the paper and other property in Renfrew to E. Roy Sayles of Toronto, in 1925, of the Canadian Weekly Newspapers Association. Sayles took possession of the Mercury immediately, while Davies and sons Fred and Arthur took possession of the Kingston Whig, which they purchased, immediately. Sayles remained prominent in the industry, acting as a delegate to the British Empire Press Union Conference in 1930.

=== Frood ownership ===
Hilda Frood was owner, but died in March 1964. The newspaper was sold.

=== Wilson ownership ===
On Frood's death, Boyd, Norman, and Kent Wilson took over. Norman Wilson began as a printing apprentice at the paper in 1954, doing photography in 1958, moving on to reporting until the Mercury and Advance merged.

=== McQuaig ownership ===
For most of the years of the Wilson ownership a second newspaper in the town operated. The Renfrew Advance had been purchased by Donald McQuaig in 1951 and the two weeklies had a vigorous competition. Finally, in 1971 McQuaig bought out the Wilson's, offering all of them jobs at the new Renfrew Mercury-Advance. After a period of almost two years, the name reverted to Mercury. The combined newspaper started to buy up local newspapers, first the Arnprior Chronicle, then Carleton Place Canadian. For a short time weeklies were operated in Stittsville (an Ottawa suburb), West Carleton, and Perth. The newspaper was sold to Runge newspapers in 1978. The Wilson's continued to work at Runge Newspapers

=== Metroland ownership ===
Runge Newspapers was acquired by Metroland in October 2005, rebranding the papers into their chain. The group, dubbed Ottawa Region Media Group, publishes 15 community papers in 16 markets. Among them is the Perth Courier, Canada's second oldest weekly.

Births, marriages & deaths : abstracts from the Renfrew mercury, a series of finding aids by Aldene Church and Les Church, span 1871 to 1926.

Under Metroland, Friday editions have become known as the Renfrew Weekender.

== See also ==
- List of newspapers in Canada
