= Guelph Mercury Tribune =

- Front page of the March 26, 2020 edition
- Type: Weekly newspaper, online
- Format: Tabloid
- Owner: Torstar
- Founder: 1986 as Royal Tribune
- Publisher: Neil Oliver
- Managing editor: Robyn Wilkinson
- General manager: Nelson Parreira
- News editor: Ned Bekavac
- Relaunched: 2016 as Guelph Mercury Tribune
- Headquarters: Guelph, Ontario
- Website: www.guelphmercury.com

The Guelph Mercury Tribune, formerly known as the Royal Tribune and the Guelph Tribune, is a twice-weekly newspaper serving the city of Guelph, Ontario, Canada.

== History ==
The Guelph Tribune was founded on September 30, 1986 as the Royal Tribune, a once-a-week community newspaper. The paper was later renamed the Guelph Tribune and in 2016 as the Guelph Mercury Tribune after the closure of the daily Guelph Mercury in January 2016. The newspaper published twice a week until 2018, when it went down to one publication per week. It focuses on local news. The Mercury Tribune has had five owners and eight publishers since it began. It employs carriers to deliver the paper and advertisements with it.

== Present ==
Torstar bought the newspaper from Southam in 2004 and it is now part of the Metroland Media Group which includes regional sister daily newspaper the Waterloo Region Record (Kitchener, Cambridge and Waterloo), as well as a group of weekly newspapers. The paper is distributed free of charge, and is supported through donation drives and advertisements. On April 28, 2016, the Tribune was renamed the Guelph Mercury Tribune.

=== Newsrooms ===
The Guelph Tribune and Guelph Mercury were owned and published by Metroland Media Group but kept separate newsrooms and operations.

== See also ==
- List of newspapers in Canada
