= Barrie Advance =

- Front page of the April 30, 2020 edition
- Type: Weekly newspaper
- Founder: Thomas Fox Davies (modern edition founded by Metroland Media Group)
- Founded: 1847 (modern edition founded in 1987)
- ISSN: 1180-6656
- Website: www.simcoe.com/barrie-on/

The Barrie Advance is a weekly newspaper serving Barrie, Ontario.

== History ==
The first newspaper north of Toronto was published August 6, 1847, though because it was truly a time of pioneer printing, it was actually a week later due to a delay in being able to print the second side of the paper! The Northern Advance, known then as the Barrie Magnet, was launched by Thomas Fox Davies. A Toronto Globe expat, Davies was accompanied in this task by William R. Robertson, though Robertson would only stay with the paper for three months. Davies was born in Manchester, England in September 1819, where he apprenticed for the Manchester Salford Advertiser from the ages of 15 to 22. Before leaving England, a trip through the country included a stint at the Oxford University Press. In September, 1843 he arrived in New York, passing through New Orleans and Cincinnati before coming to Toronto. Globe proprietor Peter Brown was fortunate that Davies arrival coincided with the acquiring of a new press that no one else had much understanding of (a Hoe Press, that first power press in Canada). Three years later, Davies would take up the challenge that no other “typos” would, establishing a journal in the district of Simcoe. It would be a two-day journey bringing his printing equipment from Toronto to Barrie, carts that also had a stock of issues of the Globe, as the first issues of the Magnet were printed on recycled Toronto newsprint.

It should be mentioned that Davies is credited as having the first suggestion of the “web” principle of printing, in which newspapers are fed into then-modern presses from large rolls of paper instead of single sheets. Davies made this suggestion based on calico printing machines from England, with a tool that cuts the paper at a required size, to one of the visiting Hoe brothers at the Globe pressroom.

The paper vigorously advocated for a railway in Barrie, to assist in the marketing and transportation of grain. The northern terminus of this rail, the Huron & Simcoe Railway constructed in 1851, would lead to the creation of Collingwood. Davies renamed the paper as the Advance to honour of the progressive spirit of the times. Further on he would oversee The Spirit Of The Age, a prominent Orangemen focus publication, before returning to the Advance and then on to the Examiner and finally the Barrie Gazette. Davies died in November 10, 1903, leaving a widow, Elenaor Davies of Tyrone County, Ireland, and six children.

The four page paper contained the standard items found in papers of the day, editorials and readers’ letters on the second page, local news in the back. There was a great demand for foreign news, despite it being weeks old on reaching Canada, by recent settlers wanting to know of their former homelands. A long running theme in the paper was a distinct rivalry with the members of the Orillia Packet, sniping at their editors who had come around town soliciting subscriptions. The paper historically served the communities of Adjala, Bradford, Bracebridge, Collingwood, East Gwillimbury, Essa, Gravenhurst, Innisfill, Oro, Tossorontio, Ivy, Mono Road, Keenansville, Hawkestone, Stroud, Anten Mills, Thornton, Midhurst, Utopia, Holly, Craighurst, Medonte and Barrie.

In 1854 the Magnet was purchased by Richard Jose Oliver, a native of Cornwall, England. Oliver added a book bindery to the already burgeoning business. The Magnet would start off politically neutral, but by August 1848 had shifted to support the Baldwin Reformers, there already being plenty of literature in Barrie for those of a Tory or Orange Order persuasion. With Oliver the Advance shifted further left, until 1859, when he was appointed Crown Lands Agent for the district of Muskoka.

By 1862 the paper was being published by Daniel Crew, and during this time its fierce rival, the Examiner, opened shop in 1864. The two papers were located on adjoining properties, south of Mulcaster on the southeast side of Dunlop Street. Mr. Crew would publish the paper until November 5, 1874, when the new proprietors announced themselves in a “Our Bow To The Public” prospectus. Samuel Wesley and Robert King stated their continued upholding of the Liberal Conservative tack of the paper and dedication as a family journal of literature, accurate reporting of farmers’ markets, and offering of legal documents from the offices.

Wesley is mentioned in articles about local baseball, Willam Boys’ Central Committee, the Sons of Temperance, and the 1897 Canadian Sessional Papers, speaking on the sleepiness of springtime Black Bass in Lake Simcoe. Mr. King left the paper within a few years and has the distinction of being the longest-serving chief of police in Barrie, holding the post from 1888 to 1923. Wesley is listed as the main proprietor from 1880 until 1905, when he was joined by Thompson Crew.

Thompson was born in 1868, the son of previous owner Daniel, and ran the paper with Wesley until his retirement in the November 4th, 1909 issue. Thompson would run the paper until July 1, 1917, when he was appointed Postmaster of Barrie. He married Mary Wilkinson at an unknown date, and died in 1943.

The paper was next owned by James Baldwin Bryant, who also served as managing editor, starting on February 28, 1918. H. J. Cave was also a publisher during this period. Prior to his position at the Stouffville Tribune, A. V. Nolan was a publisher, and was joined by S. Stewart McKenzie, who left to publish the Bradford Witness. McKenzie was replaced by Malcolm D. Morrison (1876 -1956). After Nolan left in July 1921, Morrison assumed sole control until selling the paper in August 1938. Editors of the paper during the 20th century included Claude Sanagan, A. C. Batten, both of Toronto, and T. W. Torrance, later editor of the Chatham Planet. The new owners were Stanley R. Pitts and H. M. Davies, who would run the paper until its purchase by the Examiner, the Advance's final issue published in March 1940. The Barrie Advance reopened shop in October 1987 on Patterson Road, publishing today under Metroland Media Group with Dana Robbins as publisher.

The newspaper was founded in 1987 by Metroland Media Group. Shortly after publishing its first issue, the Advance purchased the former Barrie Banner, a community newspaper with more than 20-years history in the Barrie area. The Advance changed its name to the Banner Advance, shortly after the purchase, to incorporate the two newspapers, later evolving into the Barrie Advance as it is named today.

== Present day ==
The Barrie Advance serves as head office for the Metroland Media Group Simcoe County Division, which includes the Alliston Herald/Courier, Collingwood Connection, Midland Mirror and Orillia Today newspapers.

== See also ==
- List of newspapers in Canada
