= University of Toronto Mississauga Students' Union =

Student union at the University of Toronto

Erindale College Student Union
- Institution: University of Toronto Mississauga
- Location: 1815 Inner Circle; Student Centre room 100; Mississauga, Ontario, Canada
- Established: August 2, 1983 (43 years ago)
- President: Adam El-Falou (2026)
- Vice presidents: Campus Life: Lois Ogunnubi-Oriade; Equity: Tiffany Da Silva; External: Rajas Dhamija; Internal: Xingyi (Freya) Gao; University Affairs: Dana Al-Habash
- Members: 14,000+
- Affiliations: CFS
- Website: utmsu.ca

The Erindale College Student Union, operating as the University of Toronto Mississauga Students' Union (UTMSU), is the elected representative body for full-time undergraduates registered at the Mississauga campus of the University of Toronto. Established in 1983, it has been the official representative student committee since 2019.

Based at the Student Centre in Mississauga, Ontario, the UTMSU holds the authority to recognize student associations and clubs at the campus. It represents all full-time U of T Mississauga undergraduates, in addition to students in the Mississauga Academy of Medicine and Lawrence Bloomberg Faculty of Nursing who are registered at the Mississauga campus.

The UTMSU is one of the five primary students' unions at the University of Toronto and maintains a partnership with the other four: the University of Toronto Students' Union, Scarborough Campus Students' Union, Association of Part-time Undergraduate Students at the University of Toronto, and University of Toronto Graduate Students' Union. It is also affiliated as local 109 of the Canadian Federation of Students (CFS).

== History ==
The Erindale College Student Union was incorporated on August 2, 1983 as an informal representative organization for students at the University of Toronto's Mississauga campus, then known as Erindale College. At the time, the University of Toronto Students' Union (UTSU) was the official representative student committee (as outlined in the University of Toronto Act) for undergraduates at Erindale, as recognized by the University of Toronto Governing Council. The Erindale College Student Union entered an Associate Membership Agreement (AMA) with the UTSU in 2008, where Mississauga students would pay part of their tuition to the UTSU and part to the UTMSU. In 2018, each body voted independently to end the AMA, as the Mississauga campus had grown significantly and students sought their own representation. This separation became official that year and in 2019, the Governing Council passed a resolution to make the Erindale College Student Union, now operating as the University of Toronto Mississauga Students' Union, the campus's official representative student committee.

== Operations ==
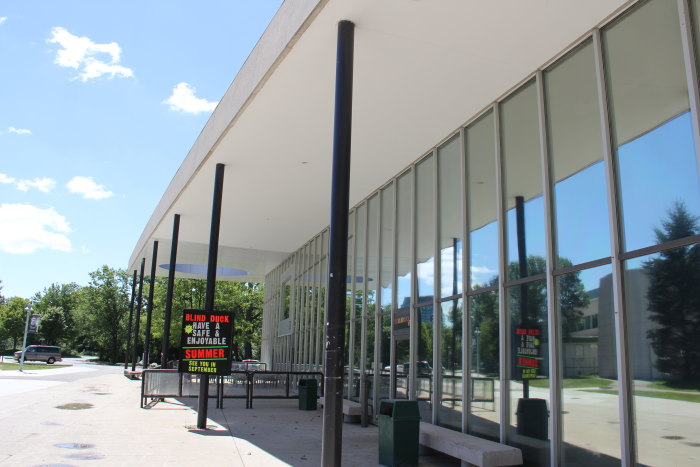
The Blind Duck patio outside the Student Centre

=== Student Centre ===
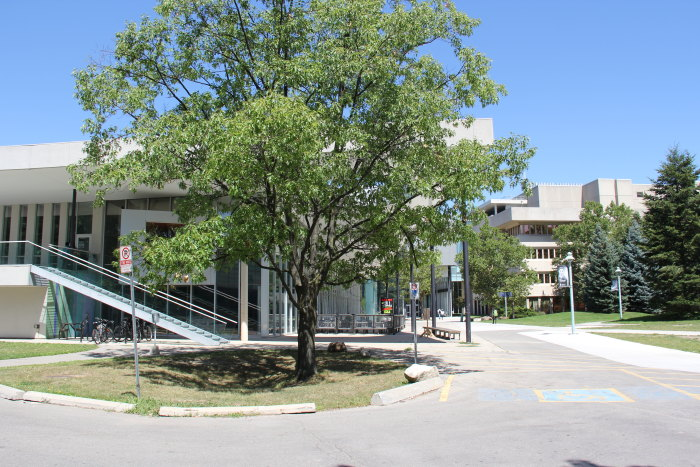
The Student Centre, opened in 1999

The UTMSU is based in the Mississauga campus Student Centre which opened in 1999. Located in the middle of campus, the centre has long been a hub for student activities and is also home to various clubs, student societies, and The Medium, the primary campus newspaper of the University of Toronto Mississauga. The Student Centre also houses The Blind Duck, the student-run campus pub established in 1999 and owned by the UTMSU. The centre also houses a Chatime location. A student-run convenience store, known as the Duck Stop, was opened in 2015.

=== Levy groups ===
The UTMSU funds select student organizations through a levy collected from student tuition. Independent groups funded by levy include the student newspaper The Medium, the radio station CFRE, and the Blue Sky Solar Racing team.

== Criticisms and controversy ==
In 2025 the UTMSU, in collaboration with a Palestinian student club, held an event on the Mississauga campus advertised as a vigil for victims of the ongoing Gaza War. This event, held on October 7 — two years following the beginning of the conflict in 2023 — garnered the attention of several headlines criticizing the students' union, with the National Post accusing it of "glorifying terrorism". Notably, the Ontario minister of energy and mines Stephen Lecce wrote on Twitter that such type of gathering "should be condemned and banned from any campus." According to a student representative, the purpose of the ceremony was "to hold space for people to grieve the countless innocent lives lost over the past two years, and especially since Oct. 7, 2023," and denied all allegations of antisemitism and hate.

== See also ==
- List of Ontario students' associations
