= The Suburban =

Canadian newspaper

- Type: Weekly newspaper
- Format: Tabloid
- Owner: Sochaczevski family
- Founder: Sophie Wollock
- Publisher: Michael Sochaczevski
- Editor-in-chief: Beryl Wajsman
- Associate editor: Anthony Bonaparte
- Founded: March 1, 1963
- Language: English
- Headquarters: 7575 Trans-Canada Highway; Suite 105; Montreal, Quebec; H4T 1V6
- Circulation: 145,000
- ISSN: 0226-9686
- OCLC number: 8663159
- Website: TheSuburban.com

The Suburban is the largest English language weekly newspaper in the province of Quebec. The newspaper has always been a free newspaper.

It is a community newspaper based in Montreal's Saint-Laurent borough which publishes three geographically based editions containing some shared and some location-specific content, to populations in Montreal's West Island, East End and inner suburbs, as well Laval—Quebec's third-largest city—located just north of Montreal on the adjacent island of Île Jésus. Total circulation of all three editions is 145,000—making it the largest weekly newspaper in Quebec.

The Suburban was established by Sophie Wollock on March 1, 1963, in the Montreal suburb of Côte-Saint-Luc. The Wollock family owned the newspaper until 1987, when it was sold to the Sochaczevski family. The newspaper's editor-in-chief is Jennifer Cox. Its associate publisher is Oliver Sutton and its publisher is Michael Sochaczevski.

== See also ==
- List of newspapers in Canada
