= The Mississauga News =

News website and former newspaper in Mississauga, Ontario, Canada

Coordinates: 43.566229°N 79.640059°W

- The front page of The Mississauga News on April 18, 2019
- Type: News website
- Owner: Metroland Media Group (Torstar)
- Founded: 1965
- Circulation: 124,805 Wednesday; 122,874 Friday (December 2012)
- ISSN: 0834-6585
- OCLC number: 290997481
- Website: www.mississauga.com

The Mississauga News is a local news website in Mississauga, Ontario. The Mississauga News is part of Metroland Media Group, a subsidiary of Torstar.

Originally founded as a newspaper in 1965, the News ceased publishing a physical edition in 2023 after parent company Metroland entered bankruptcy protection and now operates as a news website.

== History ==
Founded in 1965, The Mississauga News is characterized by its coverage of local issues, including those relating to civic politics, arts and entertainment, sports, crime, and recreation.

Upon Eve Adams' election as an MP in Stephen Harper's Conservative government, in the 2011 federal election, a seat in the City of Mississauga council was made available. "In the interest of ensuring fair and unbiased coverage for all candidates running in the Sept. 19 Ward 5 by-election," all stories about the vote and candidates were defaulted to not allow comments.

== Publishers ==
- Ron Lenyk (1978-2008)
- Ken Nugent (2009-2012)
- Dana Robbins (2013–2019)

Lenyk joined the Mississauga News in 1970 as a sports writer and a year later became the Mississauga News editor. In 1977, Lenyk was appointed publisher of The Brampton Guardian and the Mississauga News in 1978. He was named South Peel regional publisher and vice-president of Metroland Media Group Ltd. in 2004 and in 2008 the Ontario Press Council elected Lenyk as one of its four new directors to represent the newspaper industry.

Ken Nugent announced that he is retiring in January, wrapping up a 40-year career in the community newspaper business. The decision caps a successful career that began when Nugent was hired by The News to sell advertising in 1973. Nugent will retire from his post as vice-president and publisher of the Metroland's flagship Peel and Southwestern divisions, including The News and The Brampton Guardian, and presiding over 21 other community newspapers.

Previously the publisher of The Hamilton Spectator, Dana Robbins left the post to take on the new role of the vice-president/regional publisher of Metroland's Peel and Southwestern Ontario region as of January 3, 2013. This includes such papers as the Mississauga News, The Brampton Guardian, Orangeville Banner, Fergus Elora News Express and Wingham Advance Times.

== See also ==
- List of newspapers in Canada
