= Newspaper endorsements in the 2006 Canadian federal election =

This is a tally of newspaper and magazine endorsements in the 2006 Canadian federal election:

== Endorsing the Conservative Party ==
- Brandon Sun
- Calgary Herald
- Calgary Sun
- Edmonton Journal
- Edmonton Sun
- The Gazette (Montreal)
- The Globe and Mail
- London Free Press
- Medicine Hat News
- National Post
- Oakville Beaver
- Ottawa Citizen
- Ottawa Sun
- La Presse (Montreal)
- The Province (Vancouver)
- Le Soleil (Quebec City)
- Times & Transcript (Moncton)
- Toronto Sun
- The Vancouver Sun
- Windsor Star
- Winnipeg Free Press
- Winnipeg Sun

== Endorsing the Liberals ==
- Toronto Star

== Endorsing the Bloc Québécois ==
- Le Devoir (Montreal)

== Endorsing the Greens ==
- Kingston Whig-Standard
