= Metroland Media Group =

Canadian news company in Ontario

- Type: Division
- Industry: Publishing
- Founded: February 1981; 45 years ago (merger of Metrospan Community Newspapers and Inland Publishing Company)
- Products: Newspapers; websites
- Parent: Torstar Corporation
- Website: metroland.com

Metroland Media Group (also known as Community Brands) is a Canadian mass media publisher and distributor which primarily operates in Southern Ontario. A division of the publishing conglomerate Torstar Corporation, Metroland published more than 70 local community newspapers.

== History ==
Metroland is the publisher of daily and more than 70 community newspapers in Southern Ontario. Metroland also publishes local news. The company is a distributor of flyers and circulars. It produces specialty print products, magazines and newspaper inserts, which are geared toward specific market segments.

In February 1981, Metrospan Community Newspapers (a unit of Torstar) and Inland Publishing Company (formerly owned by The Telegram Corporation, owned by the Eaton and Bassett families) merged to become Metroland.

Metroland Publishing was combined with CityMedia Group to create Metroland Media Group on September 11, 2006. It is a wholly owned subsidiary of Torstar Corporation. In October 2011, it was announced that Metroland acquired Performance Printing of Smiths Falls, Ontario. The acquisition greatly expanded Metroland's community newspaper coverage in Eastern Ontario.

In 2013, the company cut the frequency of three Toronto suburban newspapers, Scarborough Mirror, North York Mirror and Etobicoke Guardian, from twice a week to once a week.

On September 15, 2023, the company filed for bankruptcy protection and ceased production of all weekly community newspapers, moving to an online-only model.

== Business areas ==
Metroland's regional and specialized business units can be grouped into five categories: Newspapers, Printing, Distribution, Digital Media, and Consumer Marketing. After September 15, 2023, the physical printing and distribution of the newspaper unit has ended and moved online.

== Digital media ==
Metroland Media entered into digital media and the internet with the migration of its community newspaper sites online in the mid-1990s. Subsequently, Metroland built or acquired numerous online properties including save.ca, a website offering coupons and flyers; and gottarent.com, a Canadian apartment rentals listing site.

== Printing ==
Metroland Media owned four printing plants in Ontario, but outsourced some printing in 2023. The presses print Metroland Media now provide commercial printing to other clients as printing of their newspaper ceased on September 15, 2023. The combined print capacity of these print facilities is reported as more than 16 million tabloid pages per hour in full colour, approximately 250,000 newspapers per hour.

=== Newspapers ===
Metroland publishes six daily newspapers:

- The Hamilton Spectator
- Niagara Falls Review
- Peterborough Examiner
- St. Catharines Standard
- Waterloo Region Record
- Welland Tribune

Until 2023, it published over 80 local and community newspapers total. With the exception of the aforementioned daily papers, they are all now online-only.

- Brampton Guardian
- Caledon Enterprise
- Cambridge Times
- DurhamRegion.com (formerly Ajax News Advertiser, Brock Citizen, Clarington This Week, East of the City, Oshawa This Week, Pickering News Advertiser, Port Perry Star, Uxbridge Times-Journal, Whitby This Week)
- Guelph Mercury Tribune
- InsideHalton.com (formerly Burlington Post, The Canadian Champion (Milton), Independent & Free Press (Georgetown-Acton), Oakville Beaver)
- InsideOttawaValley.com (formerly Carleton Place-Almonte Canadian Gazette, Arnprior Chronicle-Guide, Kemptville Advance, Perth Courier, Renfrew Mercury, Smiths Falls Record News)
- Mississauga News
- MuskokaRegion.com (formerly Bracebridge Examiner, Huntsville Forester, Gravenhurst Banner, The Muskokan, Muskoka Region laterly styled in print as MuskokaRegion.com)
- New Hamburg Independent
- NiagaraThisWeek.com (formerly Fort Erie Post, Grimsby Lincoln News, Niagara This Week Niagara Falls edition, Niagara This Week St. Catharines-Thorold edition, Niagara This Week Welland & Pelham edition, Niagara-On-The-Lake Advance, Port Colborne Leader)
- NorthumberlandNews.com (formerly Northumberland News, Brighton Independent)
- Orangeville.com (formerly Erin Advocate and Orangeville Banner)
- ParrySound.com (formerly Parry Sound Beacon Star, Parry Sound North Star)
- Simcoe.com (formerly Alliston Herald, Barrie Advance, Bradford West Gwillimbury Topic, Collingwood Connection, Innisfil Journal, Midland Penetanguishene Mirror, Orillia Today, Stayner Sun)
- WaterlooChronicle.ca (formerly Waterloo Chronicle, and until 2019 Kitchener Post)
- YorkRegion.com (formerly Aurora Banner, East Gwillimbury Express, Georgina Advocate, King Connection, Markham Economist & Sun, Newmarket Era, Richmond Hill Liberal, Stouffville Sun-Tribune, Thornhill Liberal east and west editions, Vaughan Citizen)
- Almaguin News
- Annex Guardian
- Beach-Riverdale Mirror
- Bloor-West Villager
- City Centre Mirror
- East York Mirror
- Etobicoke Guardian
- North York Mirror
- Scarborough Mirror
- Wasaga Sun
- York Guardian

Metroland newspapers Ancaster News, Dundas Star News, Hamilton Mountain News, and Stoney Creek News were available through HamiltonNews.com, which was merged into TheSpec.com by 2022. The Sachem was also merged into TheSpec.com. Earlier newspaper titles included Flamborough Review and Glanbrook Gazette.

Kawartha Lakes This Week and Peterborough This Week were merged into The Peterborough Examiner.

=== Magazines ===
Metroland publishes dozens of magazines and specialty product titles. The general areas of interest these magazines focus on include lifestyle, leisure, parenting and transportation themes.

== Consumer marketing ==
=== Digital marketing production ===
Expansion into customer fulfilment led to creation of a Metroland Digital division in 2008 to provide SMBs (small-to-medium businesses) with full-service online marketing capabilities such as fully custom websites, e-commerce websites, paid search (like Google Adwords), search engine optimization (SEO) as well as social media marketing and display advertising.

=== Consumer shows ===
Metroland produces consumer shows in Toronto for specialty audiences for Metroland Media Group publications. Metroland produces several consumer shows and exhibitions including the Toronto Golf & Travel Show, the National Bridal Show, the Forever Young Lifestyle Show, the City Parent Family Show and numerous local area shows.

== Competition ==
Other large media and publishing companies in the area are also engaged in convergence of their printing and digital activities, and constitute the primary market competition for Metroland in the region. Among these are Rogers Media, Transcontinental Media, Quebecor and The AdMill Group.

== Awards ==
Metroland Media publications have been recognized with Local Media Association awards such as (2013):

- Journalist of the Year – All Classes Combined
- Top Company Winners (92)
- Top Newspaper Winners (14)
