= Brampton Guardian =

Canadian local newspaper in Ontario

- Type: Weekly newspaper
- Owner: Metroland Media Group (Torstar)
- Publisher: Dana Robbins
- Founded: September 13, 1964; 61 years ago
- Political alignment: Conservative (as of 2011)
- Language: English
- Headquarters: 3145 Wolfedale Rd. Mississauga, Ontario
- Circulation: 345,000
- Sister newspapers: South Asian Focus
- ISSN: 0841-6958
- OCLC number: 19105776
- Website: www.bramptonguardian.com

The Brampton Guardian is a news website in Brampton, Ontario, Canada. Formerly it was a locally distributed, free, weekly community newspaper.

== History ==
In the late 1950s, the Bramalea development began, under the oversight of Bayton Holdings Ltd., then Bramalea Consolidated Developments Limited. An attempt at a self-contained community, the "satellite city" included industrial parks, shopping centres, and other conveniences. Bramalea Limited created a newspaper for the community, The Bramalea Guardian. The Guardian was first published August 13, 1964, as a weekly in tabloid format publication.

It was created as a corporately run publication, and was sold in 1966 to The Toronto Telegram. The paper soon began running two front pages, one with a Bramalea-oriented lead story, the other with a Brampton-based story; the title of the publication became The Brampton/Bramalea Guardian. When the Telegram closed, Douglas Bassett sold the Guardian to the Inland Publishing chain, owned by The Toronto Star. In 1971, the newspaper transitioned to broadsheet format, and in 1973, it became The Brampton Guardian. In 1981, Inland transferred the paper to Metroland, where it has remained ever since. In 1988, weekly circulation was 120,000, and the publication had a staff of 150. From 1973 to 1988, The Brampton Guardian has won over 100 awards for community journalism.

The Region of Peel Archives, part of the Peel Art Gallery, Museum and Archives, holds the newspaper's photographic records from both The Bramalea Guardian, The Guardian, and The Brampton Guardian eras.

A short-lived rival, The Brampton Bulletin, lasted from 2005 until early November 2006.

== Segments ==
=== The Brampton Booster ===
The final issue was published January 6, 2011; it was replaced the next week by Thursday edition of The Brampton Guardian.

=== South Asian Focus ===
The Region of Peel and the wider Greater Toronto Area continues to welcome a rapidly growing visible minority community. The minority is now becoming the majority in several pockets of the GTA, and South Asians spearhead this demographic shift.

South Asian Focus was established based on these trends in early 2007 as a weekly newspaper addressing issues of interest to all South Asian communities.

== See also ==
- List of newspapers in Canada
