= Waterloo Region Record =

Daily newspaper in Ontario, Canada

The Waterloo Region Record (formerly The Record) is the daily newspaper covering Waterloo Region, Ontario, Canada, including the cities of Kitchener, Waterloo and Cambridge, as well as the surrounding area. Since December 1998, the Record has been published by Metroland Media Group, a subsidiary of Torstar Corporation. On May 26, 2020, Torstar, agreed to be acquired by NordStar Capital, a private investment firm. The deal closed in August, 2020.

== History ==
The Record traces its history back to the founding of the Daily News, first published on February 9, 1878, by former Methodist preacher Peter Moyer at a printing press located at King and Ontario streets in Berlin (now Kitchener). This would be the city's first daily newspaper, and Canada's first bilingual daily as it was supplemented with a full page of German news for the first eight months of its life.

In 1896, at the time of Moyer's death, three newspapers existed in the city of Berlin: the Berlin Daily Telegraph, the Berlin Daily Record and Moyer's Daily News. Due to financial pressures, by 1897 the latter two had merged to become the Berlin News Record, run by William (Ben) Uttley, publisher of the Berlin Daily Record and local historian. Retiring in October 1919, Uttley sold the newspaper to W.J. Motz and William Daum Euler, who renamed it The Kitchener Daily Record.

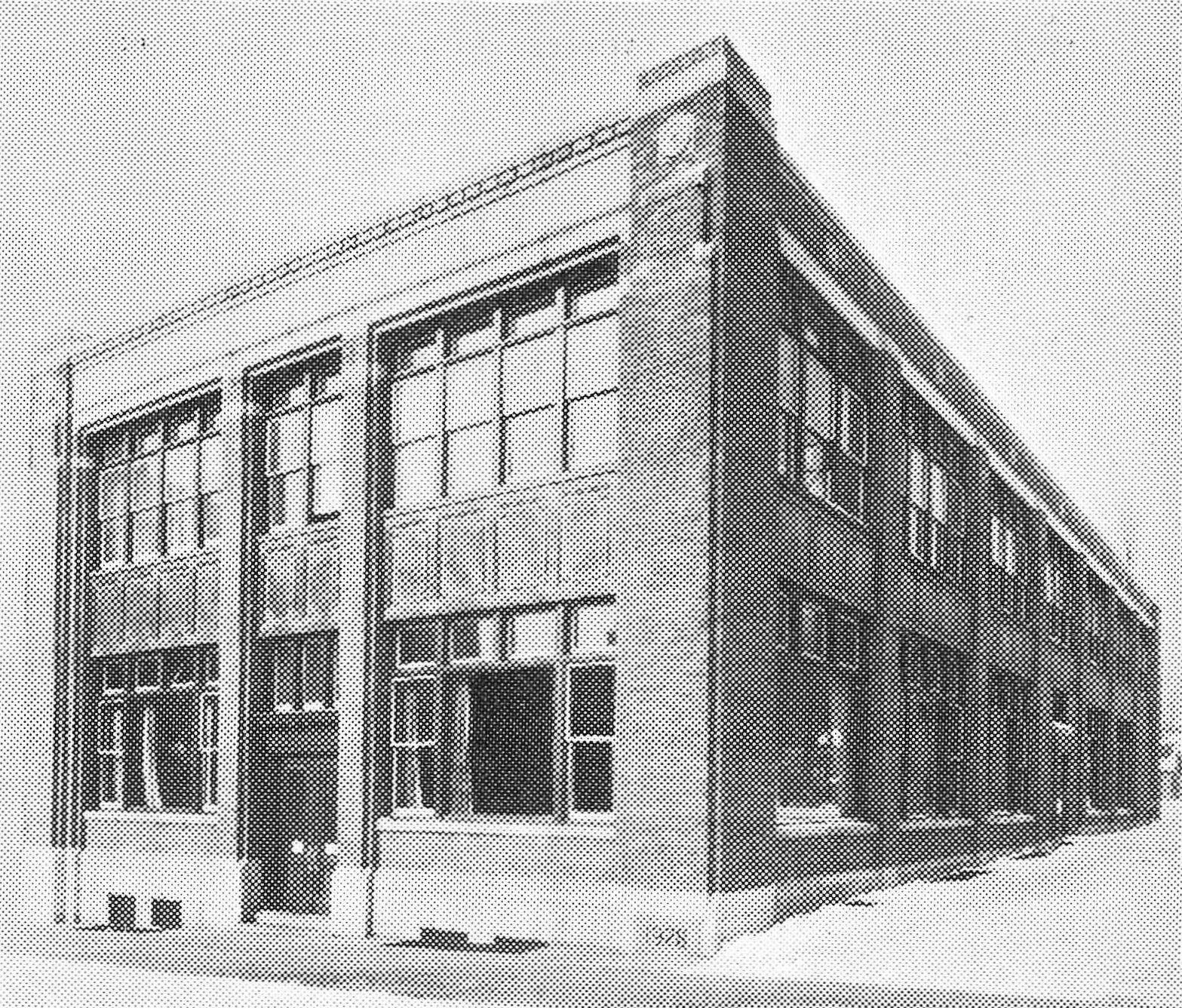
The 1929 headquarters at 30 Queen Street North, designed by Bernal Ambrose Jones

In 1922, the Daily Record took over the Daily Telegraph, leaving it the only newspaper of significant size serving the community. On April 2, 1929, the newspaper moved from 49 King Street West to what was at the time considered the most modern printing operation in the country (using a 24-page press) at 30 Queen Street North. Motz and Euler fought over control of the newspaper for the next two decades, with the former eventually winning majority interest. Euler sold his stock to Southam Company in 1953, leaving Motz's son, John E. Motz, the sole director of the rapidly growing daily.

On January 1, 1948, John Motz changed the name of the newspaper once again, to The Kitchener-Waterloo Record (to mark the occasion of Waterloo's designation as a city), a name which remained until the change to The Record, in 1994. During this period the 24-page press would be replaced first by a 48-page press in the 1950s, a 96-page press in 1961–1962, and a 128-page press in 1973. In 1962, it was the first company in Canada to use plastic sleeves to protect newspapers bound for rural addresses.

Ownership had been in the hands of the Motz family for generations until 1990, when the paper was sold to Southam in a $90 million deal. Conrad Black's Hollinger Inc. took a controlling interest in Southam during the period when it owned The Record. The paper was acquired by Sun Media in 1998, but Sun itself was bought by Quebecor soon after, and The Record was sold to Torstar before the end of the year. The administrative records and photographic negatives of the paper amassed prior to the Sun Media acquisition are maintained at the University of Waterloo Library.

On June 3, 2002, The Record switched from being an afternoon newspaper to morning one.

In January 2005, the paper was moved to Market Square on King Street East in Kitchener's downtown core. It had been based on Fairway Road in Kitchener since May 1973. The paper was printed at that location on a letterpress system until 2000, when printing was moved to offset presses at parent company Torstar's Vaughan Press Centre in Vaughan. Printing later moved to presses of sister papers in Hamilton and Guelph, and then back to Vaughan from time to time. As of 2014, the Record is usually printed at the Star-owned Hamilton Spectator. On May 24, 2019, Torstar Corporation announced it will close its Hamilton Spectator printing operations on or about August 24, 2019. The printing work (including printing of the Record) performed at the Hamilton facility will be transferred to TC Transcontinental Printing, various Torstar-owned facilities, and other external printers.

The Record building on Fairway Road in Kitchener was demolished in September 2005.

On March 11, 2008, the name was changed to the Waterloo Region Record, returning the community name to the nameplate.

In early 2018, the company announced that it would set up a paywall on its website. Consumers who do not pay the fee to subscribe will be allowed to read only seven articles per month. An article published by CBC News indicated that this strategy has not been successful for some newspapers. The New York Times has a million subscribers but the publication has an international cachet that makes it a "must-read", especially in the U.S. where Fake news has been widespread.

== Circulation ==
The Waterloo Region Record has seen like most Canadian daily newspapers a decline in circulation. Its total circulation dropped by 14 percent to 53,283 copies daily from 2009 to 2015.

Daily average

== Awards ==
The Record has won the Michener Award for meritorious public service in journalism four times: 1978, 1981 (shared), 1983, and 2001. It received the 2001 award for breaking the story on the RIM Park financing fiasco.

== Other publications ==
In November 2005, the Record began publishing Grand, a regional lifestyle magazine. It followed that with the March 2006 launch of Rex, a business magazine covering Waterloo Region and Guelph. Most magazine, for women over 40, was launched in the spring of 2008. Rex was scheduled to suspend publication after the April 2009 issue. All magazines are distributed independently of the newspaper.

Both the Cambridge Times and the Record are owned and published by Metroland Media Group but keep separate newsrooms and operations.

== See also ==
- Metroland Media Group
- Torstar
- List of newspapers in Canada
- List of newspapers in Canada by circulation
