= Nova Scotia Route 202 =

Highway in Nova Scotia, Canada

Route 202

Route information
- Maintained by Nova Scotia Department of Transportation and Infrastructure Renewal
- Length: 38 km (24 mi)

Major junctions
- South end: Trunk 1 in Mount Uniacke (Lakelands)
- Trunk 14 in Centre Rawdon; Route 354 in Gore
- North end: Trunk 14 in Nine Mile River, Cheese Factory Corner

Location
- Country: Canada
- Province: Nova Scotia
- Counties: Hants

Highway system
- Provincial highways in Nova Scotia; 100-series
← Route 201	→ Route 203

Route 202 is a collector road in the Canadian province of Nova Scotia.

It is located within the Municipality of the District of East Hants in Hants County and connects Lakelands at Trunk 1 with Nine Mile River at Trunk 14.

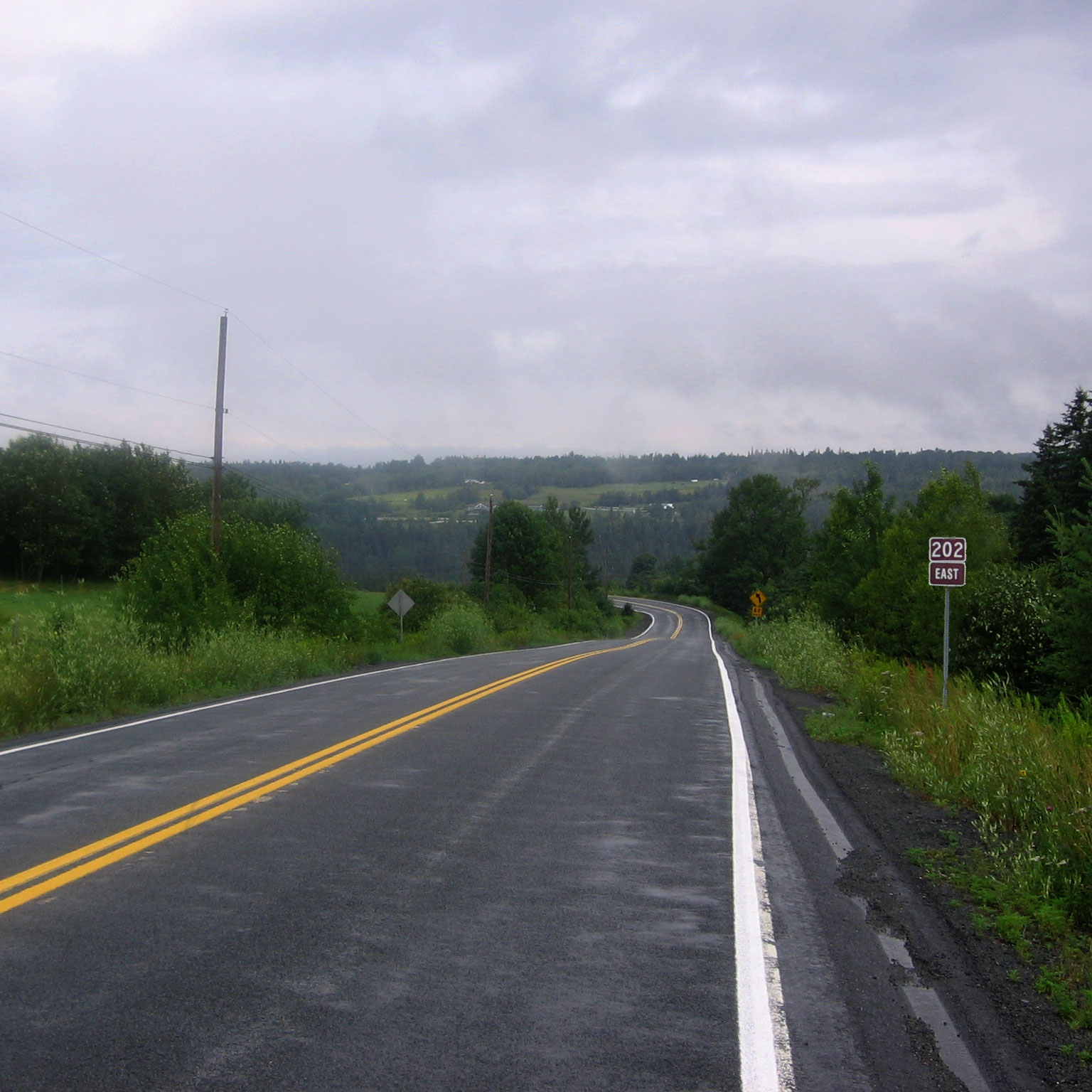
Section of Route 202 in South Rawdon, Nova Scotia

== Communities ==
- Lakelands
- Hillsvale
- South Rawdon
- Centre Rawdon
- Clarksville
- West Gore
- Gore
- East Gore
- Upper Nine Mile River
- Cheese Factory Corner

== See also ==
- List of Nova Scotia provincial highways
