= List of The Amazing Race Canada contestants =

This is a list of contestants who have appeared on The Amazing Race Canada, a Canadian reality competition show based on the American series, The Amazing Race. As of season 12, a total of 266 contestants have appeared in the series.

== Contestants ==
Contestant participated in The Amazing Race Canada for a second time.

Name	Age	Occupation	Current City	Season	Finish	Source
Treena Ley	36	Police sergeant	Hamilton, ON	Season 1	9th	
Tennille Dorrington	36	Tax auditor	Hamilton, ON	Season 1	9th	
James "Jamie" Cumberland	47	HR advisor	Airdrie, AB	Season 1	8th	
Pierre Cadieux	38	GM creditor insurance and banker	Innisfail, AB	Season 1	8th	
Kristen Idiens	32	Outdoor adventure guide	Fairmont Hot Springs, BC	Season 1	7th	
Darren Trapp	26	White water raft guide, lifeguard	Fairmont Hot Springs, BC	Season 1	7th	
Hal Johnson	57	Television personality and fitness icon	Oakville, ON	Season 1	6th	
Joanne McLeod	54	Television personality and fitness icon	Oakville, ON	Season 1	6th	
Holly Agostino	33	Paediatrician	Montreal, QC	Season 1	5th	
Brett Burstein	33	Paediatrician	Montreal, QC	Season 1	5th	
Jethro "Jet" Black	32	Police officer	London, ON	Season 1	4th	
David "Dave" Schram	28	Marketing executive	London, ON	Season 1	4th	
Vanessa Morgan	21	Actress	Ottawa, ON	Season 1	3rd	
Celina Mziray	30	Bikini model	Ottawa, ON	Season 1	3rd	
Jody Mitic	36	Retired army sniper, motivational speaker	Ottawa, ON	Season 1	2nd	
Cory Mitic	32	Labour relations officer	Edmonton, AB	Season 1	2nd	
Timothy "Tim" Hague, Sr.	48	Registered nurse	Winnipeg, MB	Season 1	1st	
Timothy "Tim" Hague, Jr.	23	Sales	Winnipeg, MB	Season 1	1st	
Shahla Kara	29	Occupational therapist	Markham, ON	Season 2	11th	
Nabeela Barday	29	Management consulting	Markham, ON	Season 2	11th	
Jennifer "Jen" King	40	Holistic nutrition practitioner	Halifax, NS	Season 2	10th	
Shawn King	41	Advertising agency partner, president and chief creative officer	Halifax, NS	Season 2	10th	
Laura Takahashi	28	Media development	Toronto, ON	Season 2	9th	
Jacqueline "Jackie" Skinner	31	Musician	Toronto, ON	Season 2	9th	
Cormac Foster	19	Student	Winnipeg, MB	Season 2	8th	
Nicole Foster	39	Director of resident services	Winnipeg, MB	Season 2	8th	
Rex Harrington	51	Ballet dancer	Ashburn, ON	Season 2	7th	
Robert "Bob" Hope	47	Dental consultant	Ashburn, ON	Season 2	7th	
Pierre Forget	42	Family meatpacking company owner	Terrebonne, QC	Season 2	6th	
Michel Forget	42	Family meatpacking company owner	Terrebonne, QC	Season 2	6th	
Alain Chanoine	32	Actor	Saint-Hubert, QC	Season 2	5th	
Audrey Tousignant-Maurice	31	Real estate broker	Saint-Hubert, QC	Season 2	5th	
Sukhi Atwal	32	Entrepreneur	Terrace, BC	Season 2	4th	
Harjinder "Jinder" Atwal	26	Entrepreneur	Terrace, BC	Season 2	4th	
Ryan Steele	36	Bartender/sketch comic	Vancouver, BC	Season 2	3rd	
Robert "Rob" Goddard	24	Bartender/fitness trainer	Vancouver, BC	Season 2	3rd	
Natalie Spooner	23	Hockey player, member of Canada women's national ice hockey team	Toronto, ON	Season 2	2nd	
Meaghan Mikkelson	29	Hockey player, member of Canada women's national ice hockey team	Calgary, AB	Season 2	2nd	
Michael "Mickey" Henry	24	Owner, What Wake Park operator	Seguin, ON	Season 2	1st	
Peter "Pete" Schmalz	24	Deck installer	Parry Sound, ON	Season 2	1st	
Max Altamuro	28	Retail manager	Toronto, ON	Season 3	12th	
Elias Theodorou†	26	MMA fighter	Toronto, ON	Season 3	12th	
Susan Hayre	38	Corrections officer	Vancouver, BC	Season 3	11th	
Sharnjit "Sharn" Gill	39	Corrections officer	Vancouver, BC	Season 3	11th	
Dana Hayward	23	Royal Newfoundland Constabulary police officer	Wabush, NL	Season 3	10th	
Amanda Johnston	23	Royal Newfoundland Constabulary police officer	Wabush, NL	Season 3	10th	
Hamilton Elliott	19	Service industry	Centreville, NS	Season 3	9th	
Michaelia Drever	19	Service industry	Centreville, NS	Season 3	9th	
Nicholas "Nic" La Monaca	22	Student/Soccer coach	Montreal, QC	Season 3	8th	
Sabrina Mercuri	32	Human resources	Montreal, QC	Season 3	8th	
Neil Lumsden	62	Sport marketing and events consultant/Football coach	Burlington, ON	Season 3	7th	
Kristin Lumsden	31	Makeup artist/skincare specialist	Toronto, ON	Season 3	7th	
Brian Boyd	46	Police officer	Winnipeg, MB	Season 3	6th	
Cynthia Boyd	41	Police officer	Winnipeg, MB	Season 3	6th	
Dujean Williams	25	Professional dancer	Toronto, ON	Season 3	5th	
Leilani Ross	24	Professional dancer	Toronto, ON	Season 3	5th	
Simi Fagbongbe	21	Business-to-business Sales and marketing associate	Burnaby, BC	Season 3	4th	
Ope Fagbongbe	46	Distribution logistics coordinator	Burnaby, BC	Season 3	4th	
Brent Sweeney	25	Design student	Toronto, ON	Season 3	3rd	
Sean Sweeney	28	Design student	Toronto, ON	Season 3	3rd	
Nicholas "Nick" Foti	35	Professional wrestler/elementary school teacher	Newmarket, ON	Season 3	2nd	
Matthew "Matt" Giunta	33	Professional wrestler/real estate agent	Stouffville, ON	Season 3	2nd	
Gino Montani	28	City worker	Hamilton, ON	Season 3	1st	
Jesse Montani	25	Steelworker	Hamilton, ON	Season 3	1st	
Anthony Limbombe	21	Server/Nursing Student	Windsor, ON	Season 4	10th	
Brandon Campeau	21	Server	Windsor, ON	Season 4	10th	
Stéphane Tétreault	51	Entrepreneur	Montréal, QC	Season 4	9th	
Antoine Tétreault	25	Business Financial Analyst	Montréal, QC	Season 4	9th	
Anne Morrone	40	Certified Executive Coach/Opera Singer	Toronto, ON	Season 4	8th	
Tanya Muzzatti	40	Advertising Executive	Toronto, ON	Season 4	8th	
Kelly Xu	25	Fitness Entrepreneur	Toronto, ON	Season 4	7th	
Katelyn "Kate" Pan	25	Fitness Entrepreneur	Toronto, ON	Season 4	7th	
Julie Taylor	33	Speech and Language Pathologist	Lethbridge, AB	Season 4	6th	
Lowell Taylor	34	Registered Psychologist	Lethbridge, AB	Season 4	6th	
Rita Yakibonge	23	Account Representative	Edmonton, AB	Season 4	5th	
Yvette Yakibonge	23	Service Canada Agent	Edmonton, AB	Season 4	5th	
Frances "Frankie" Gassler	41	Hair Stylist	Aldergrove, BC	Season 4	4th	
Amy Gassler	25	Barber	Aldergrove, BC	Season 4	4th	
Joel Ground	42	Automotive Mechanic	Enoch Cree Nation, AB	Season 4	3rd	
Ashley Callingbull-Burnham	26	Actress/Motivational Speaker	Enoch Cree Nation, AB	Season 4	3rd	
Jillian MacLaughlin	30	Teacher	New Glasgow, NS	Season 4	2nd	
Emmett Blois	28	Dairy Farmer	Gore, NS	Season 4	2nd	
Stephanie "Steph" LeClair	27	Lawyer	Toronto, ON	Season 4	1st	
Kristen McKenzie	25	Sales Account Executive	Toronto, ON	Season 4	1st	
Aaron Baker	30	Funeral Director	Grand Forks, BC	Season 5	10th	
Deborah "Deb" Baker	55	Funeral Director	Grand Forks, BC	Season 5	10th	
Daniel "Dan" Kipnis	23	YouTube Content Creator	Toronto, ON	Season 5	9th	
Riya Malik	23	YouTube Content Creator	Toronto, ON	Season 5	9th	
Megan Burden	23	Biomedical Engineering Technology Student	St. John's, NL	Season 5	8th	
Courtney Roberts	21	Social Worker Student	St. John's, NL	Season 5	8th	
Zed Dhalla	27	Vice President Sales - Healthcare	Vancouver, BC	Season 5	7th	
Shabbir Dhalla	57	Self-Employed	Vancouver, BC	Season 5	7th	
Andrea Croxen	29	Yoga Teacher/Business Co-Founder	Montréal, QC	Season 5	6th	
Ebonie Finley-Roberge	29	Marketing Consultant/Business Co-Founder	Montréal, QC	Season 5	6th	
Adam Cavaleri	29	Bartender	Montréal, QC	Season 5	5th	
Andrea Cavaleri	28	Graphic Designer	Montréal, QC	Season 5	5th	
Karen Richards	31	Social Worker	Edmonton, AB	Season 5	4th	
Bercham "Bert" Richards	36	Small Business Owner/Musician	Edmonton, AB	Season 5	4th	
Korey Sam	31	Personal Trainer	Toronto, ON	Season 5	3rd	
Ivana Krunić	31	Personal Trainer/Substitute Teacher	Toronto, ON	Season 5	3rd	
Kenneth McAlpine†	25	Chef	Rossland, BC	Season 5	2nd	
Ryan Lachapelle	25	Resort Events Coordinator	Rossland, BC	Season 5	2nd	
Samuel "Sam" Lambert	25	Student	Toronto, ON	Season 5	1st	
Paul Mitskopoulos	24	Account Manager	Toronto, ON	Season 5	1st	
Corey "Chewy" Liddle	47	Retired Air Force Pilot	Stoney Creek, ON	Season 6	10th	
Mark "Happy" LaVerdiere	48	Retired Air Force Pilot	Orillia, ON	Season 6	10th	
Joseph Truong	23	Non-Profit Founder	Toronto, ON	Season 6	9th	
Akash Sidhu	22	Non-Profit Founder	Toronto, ON	Season 6	9th	
Todd Kirk	24	Electrician	Edmonton, AB	Season 6	8th	
Anna Holtby	24	Writer	Edmonton, AB	Season 6	8th	
Zainab Ansari	32	Royal Canadian Navy Sailor	Toronto, ON	Season 6	7th	
Monica Demian	24	Royal Canadian Navy Sailor	Ajax, ON	Season 6	7th	
Leanne Larsen	25	Toronto Argonauts Cheerleader	Toronto, ON	Season 6	6th	
Marielle "Mar" Lyon	26	Toronto Argonauts Cheerleader	Toronto, ON	Season 6	6th	
Nancy Csabay	49	Professional Barrel Racer/Horse Trainer	Taber, AB	Season 6	5th	
Mellisa Hollingsworth	37	Olympian/Public Speaker/Realtor	Eckville, AB	Season 6	5th	
Martina Seo	40	Home Economics Teacher	North Vancouver, BC	Season 6	4th	
Phil Seo	37	Credit Union Manager	Burnaby, BC	Season 6	4th	
Dylan Elias	28	Youth Mentor/Sports Program Developer	Fort McMurray, AB	Season 6	3rd	
Kwame Osei	34	Phys Ed Teacher/Football Coach	Fort McMurray, AB	Season 6	3rd	
Taylor Callens	25	Royal Canadian Mounted Police Officer	Williams Lake, BC	Season 6	2nd	
Courtney Callens	27	Royal Canadian Mounted Police Officer	Langley, BC	Season 6	2nd	
Courtney Berglind	28	Nurse	Calgary, AB	Season 6	1st	
Adam Kovacs	29	Firefighter	Calgary, AB	Season 6	1st	
Jethro "Jet" Black	40	Firefighter	Toronto, ON	Season 7	10th	
David "Dave" Schram	35	Marketing Consultant	London, ON	Season 7	10th	
Nekeita "Nicki" Lee	31	Personal Trainer	Toronto, ON	Season 7	9th	
Aisha Bentham	31	Artist/Entrepreneur	Toronto, ON	Season 7	9th	
Gilles Miron	65	Canoe Instructor	Sunderland, ON	Season 7	8th	
Sean Miron	20	Student	Sunderland, ON	Season 7	8th	
Meaghan Wright	25	Co-Founder, Mirror Image Media	Halifax, NS	Season 7	7th	
Marie Wright	25	Co-Founder, Mirror Image Media	Halifax, NS	Season 7	7th	
Trish Omeri	40	Stay-At-Home Mom	Etobicoke, ON	Season 7	6th	
Amy De Domenico	50	Stay-At-Home Mom	Etobicoke, ON	Season 7	6th	
Aarthy Ketheeswaran	25	Human Resources	Vancouver, BC	Season 7	5th	
Thinesh Kumarakulasingam	28	Software Developer	Vancouver, BC	Season 7	5th	
Dave Leduc	27	Burmese Bareknuckle Boxing World Champion	Dubai, UAE	Season 7	4th	
Irina Terehova	29	Housewife and Writer	Dubai, UAE	Season 7	4th	
Lauren Lavoie	27	Teacher	Regina, SK	Season 7	3rd	
Joanne Lavoie	21	Yoga Instructor	Regina, SK	Season 7	3rd	
Sarah Wells	29	Hurdles Track Athlete – Team Canada	Toronto, ON	Season 7	2nd	
Sam Effah	30	Sprinting Track Athlete – Team Canada	Toronto, ON	Season 7	2nd	
Anthony Johnson	33	Project Consultant	Edmonton, AB	Season 7	1st	
James Makokis	37	Doctor	Edmonton, AB	Season 7	1st	
Jully Black	44	Singer / Producer / Actress	Toronto, ON	Season 8	10th	
Kathy Hunter	41	Director, Business Development	Regina, SK	Season 8	10th	
Dennis Ashe	42	Youth Development Teacher	Halifax, NS	Season 8	9th	
Durrell Borden	33	Law Student / Community Leader	Halifax, NS	Season 8	9th	
Cassie Day	31	Entrepreneur / Personal Trainer	Toronto, ON	Season 8	8th	
Jahmeek Murray	32	Firefighter / Personal Trainer	Toronto, ON	Season 8	8th	
Cedric Newman	50	Comedian / Mechanic	Montreal, QC	Season 8	7th	
Tychon Carter-Newman	30	Content Creator / Motivational Speaker	Montreal, QC	Season 8	7th	
Siginaak (Blackbird) Court Larabee	39	Executive Director, Sports academy for Indigenous youth	Whistler, BC	Season 8	6th	
Ali (Bear) Clark	33	Visual Artist / Coach, Sports academy for Indigenous youth	Fernie, BC	Season 8	6th	
Beverley Cheng	30	Fitness Entrepreneur / Content Creator	Toronto, ON	Season 8	5th	
Veronica Skye	32	Travel Marketing / Run Club Leader	Vancouver, BC	Season 8	5th	
Brendan McDougall	29	Sales Representative	McDougall, ON	Season 8	4th	
Connor McDougall	26	Elementary School Teacher	McDougall, ON	Season 8	4th	
Franca Brodett	32	Assistant Dean of Development	Edmonton, AB	Season 8	3rd	
Nella Brodett	30	Director of Partnerships	Edmonton, AB	Season 8	3rd	
Jesse Cockney	32	Olympian / Student	Canmore, AB	Season 8	2nd	
Marika Sila	29	Actor / Performer / Content Creator	Canmore, AB	Season 8	2nd	
Catherine Wreford	42	Actor / Performer	Winnipeg, MB	Season 8	1st	
Craig Ramsay	45	Performer / Host	Windsor, ON	Season 8	1st	
Gail Kim	46	Producer and Talent Relations/Retired Pro-Wrestler	Tampa Bay, FL	Season 9	10th	
Gisele Shaw	33	Pro-Wrestler	Windsor, ON	Season 9	10th	
Allison "Allie" Seller	48	Business Coach	Courtenay, BC	Season 9	9th	
Eddie Parinas	52	Health & Fitness, Business Coach	Courtenay, BC	Season 9	9th	
Shayla Oulette Stonechild	29	Indigenous and Wellness Advocate	Vancouver, BC	Season 9	8th	
Joel Oulette	21	Actor	Medicine Hat, AB	Season 9	8th	
Gracie Lowes	25	Harm Reduction and Overdose-Related Service Provider	Toronto, ON	Season 9	7th	
Lily Bateman	24	Data Development and Communications	Whitehorse, YT	Season 9	7th	
Derek Gottenbos	28	YouTuber	Richmond, BC	Season 9	6th	
Jaspal Sidhu	28	YouTuber	Richmond, BC	Season 9	6th	
Jermaine Aranha	41	Airport Lounge Manager/Drag Queen	Toronto, ON	Season 9	5th	
Justin Baird	36	Pain Management Nurse/Drag Queen	Scarborough, ON	Season 9	5th	
Deven Condo-Mitchell	33	Conservation Officer	Gesgapegiag, QC	Season 9	4th	
Amanda Larocque	41	Director of Health & Social Services	Gesgapegiag, QC	Season 9	4th	
Ben Chutta	31	Entrepreneur	Winnipeg, MB	Season 9	3rd	
Anwar Ahmed	32	Former Talent Acquisition Specialist	Toronto, ON	Season 9	3rd	
Tyler Turner	35	Professional Athlete	Comox Valley, BC	Season 9	2nd	
Kayleen Vanderree	31	Commercial Scuba Diver	Comox Valley, BC	Season 9	2nd	
Tyler "Ty" Smith	25	Public Speaker and Mental Health Advocate	Calgary, AB	Season 9	1st	
Kat Kastner	25	Client Success Specialist	Calgary, AB	Season 9	1st	
Eva Amo-Mensah	30	Personal Trainer	Toronto, ON	Season 10	11th	
Trystenne Burey	27	Personal Trainer	Toronto, ON	Season 10	11th	
Dorothy Adeneye	29	Content Creator/Advertising Professional	Calgary, AB	Season 10	10th	
Olus Adeneye	32	Content Creator/Advertising Professional	Calgary, AB	Season 10	10th	
Connor Carroll	24	Lawyer	Pickering, ON	Season 10	9th	
John Ferguson	26	Content Creator	Erin, ON	Season 10	9th	
Brad May	52	Ex-NHL Player	Toronto, ON	Season 10	8th	
Sam May	24	Event Planner	Toronto, ON	Season 10	8th	
Julia Viola	33	Operations Manager	Clearview, ON	Season 10	7th	
Olivia Curto	33	Banking Manager	Clearview, ON	Season 10	7th	
Michael Linklater	42	Ex-Professional Basketball Player/Consultant/International Speaker	Saskatoon, SK	Season 10	6th	
Amari Linklater	19	Student/Basketball Player	Saskatoon, SK	Season 10	6th	
Kevin Martin	31	Professional Poker Player	Calgary, AB	Season 10	5th	
Gurleen Maan	35	Farmer	Abbotsford, BC	Season 10	5th	
Lauren Peters	26	Actor	Mississauga, ON	Season 10	4th	
Nicole Peters	26	Actor	Mississauga, ON	Season 10	4th	
Michael Crouse	33	Former Professional Baseball Player/Baseball Development Coach	Vancouver, BC	Season 10	3rd	
Tyson Gillies	35	Former Professional Baseball Player/Baseball Development Coach	Vancouver, BC	Season 10	3rd	
Colin Rose	33	Teacher	Mount Pearl, NL	Season 10	2nd	
Matt Roberts	31	Aviation Supply Chain Logistics	Mount Pearl, NL	Season 10	2nd	
Taylor McPherson	24	Wrestler/Indigenous Sports Coordinator	Calgary, AB	Season 10	1st	
Katie Mulkay	24	Wrestler/Educator	Edmonton, AB	Season 10	1st	
Michele Peter	39	Social Worker/Event Host	Toronto, ON	Season 11	11th	
Aditi Deonarine	38	Social Worker/Artist	Toronto, ON	Season 11	11th	
Brendan McDougall	32	Engineered Sales	McDougall, ON	Season 11	10th	
Sam May	26	Event Planner	McDougall, ON	Season 11	10th	
Osas Igbinosun	31	Musician/DevOps Engineer	Calgary, AB	Season 11	9th	
Esosa Igbinosun	35	Utility Arborist	Calgary, AB	Season 11	9th	
Louis Octeau-Piché	32	Actor	Hudson, QC	Season 11	8th	
Marie Octeau	58	Real Estate Broker	Vaudreuil-Dorion, QC	Season 11	8th	
Rebecca Merasty	35	Model	Meadow Lake, SK	Season 11	7th	
Rebecca Watt	33	Strategic Lead for Indigenous Wellness Programs	Wrigley, NWT	Season 11	7th	
Lacey Koughan	26	Business Owner	Charlottetown, PEI	Season 11	6th	
Celia Koughan	29	Actor	Charlottetown, PEI	Season 11	6th	
Ika Wong	40	Content Creator	Toronto, ON	Season 11	5th	
Demetres Giannitsos	33	Real Estate Agent	Toronto, ON	Season 11	5th	
Skylene “Nipîy” Gladue	45	Theatre Performer	Edmonton, AB	Season 11	4th	
Blair “Magoo” Gladue	51	Entertainer	Edmonton, AB	Season 11	4th	
EB Burnett	22	Model	Hamilton, ON	Season 11	3rd	
Blake Burnett	26	Bar Manager/Model	Toronto, ON	Season 11	3rd	
Grace Dove	33	Actress	Vancouver, BC	Season 11	2nd	
Joe Syme	35	Diamond Driller	Prince George, BC	Season 11	2nd	
Jesse Harink	33	Human Resources	Vancouver, BC	Season 11	1st	
Jonathon Braun	36	Lawyer (Non-Profit Legal Director)	Vancouver, BC	Season 11	1st	
Maestro Fresh Wes	58	Musician/TV Presenter/Author	Saint John, NB	Season 12	10th	
Duane "D.O." Gibson	47	Hip-Hop Artist/Motivational Speaker/Author	Woodbridge, ON	Season 12	10th	
Dana Martin-Kelly	56	Massage Therapist/Fitness Instructor	Wabush, NL	Season 12	9th	
Cordelia Richards	31	Esthetician	Wabush, NL	Season 12	9th	
Keshia Gordon	35	DJ/Events	Vancouver, BC	Season 12	8th	
Nova Stevens	33	Model/Pageant Coach	Vancouver, BC	Season 12	8th	
Chayla Rain	29	Executive Assistant	Edmonton, AB	Season 12	7th	
Chyana Marie Sage	32	Author	Hamilton, ON	Season 12	7th	
Filipe Masetti	39	Horseback Guide	Calgary, AB	Season 12	6th	
Clara Daval	32	Student	Calgary, AB	Season 12	6th	
Ameen Fadel	26	Business Owner	Windsor, ON	Season 12	5th	
Surria Fadel	62	Business Owner	Windsor, ON	Season 12	5th	
Sacha Régnier	25	Custom Upholster/Musician	Winnipeg, MB	Season 12	4th	
Sébastien Régnier	27	Skeleton Athlete/Realtor	Winnipeg, MB	Season 12	4th	
Michele Bruzzese	28	Content Creator	Toronto, ON	Season 12	3rd	
Matteo Bruzzese	26	Content Creator	Toronto, ON	Season 12	3rd	
Eamon Fitzgerald	34	Content Creator	Toronto, ON	Season 12	2nd	
Rebecca "Bec" Moroney	36	Content Creator	Toronto, ON	Season 12	2nd	
Christina "Tina" Liao	32	Corporate Lawyer	Oakville, ON	Season 12	1st	
Elizabeth "Liz" Liao	32	Family Doctor/Obstetrician	Waterdown, ON	Season 12	1st	

== Gallery ==
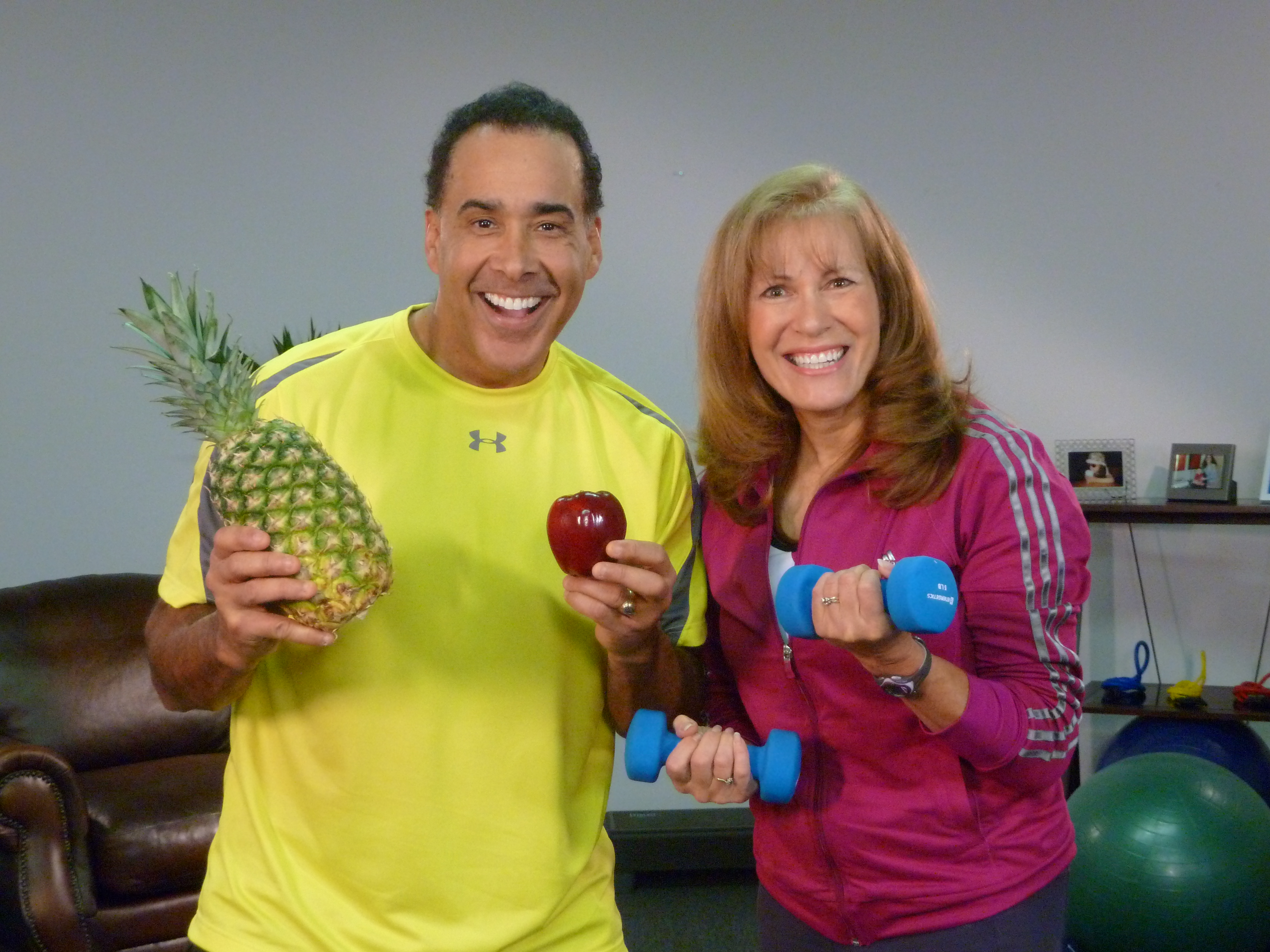
Hal Johnson and Joanne McLeod from The Amazing Race Canada 1

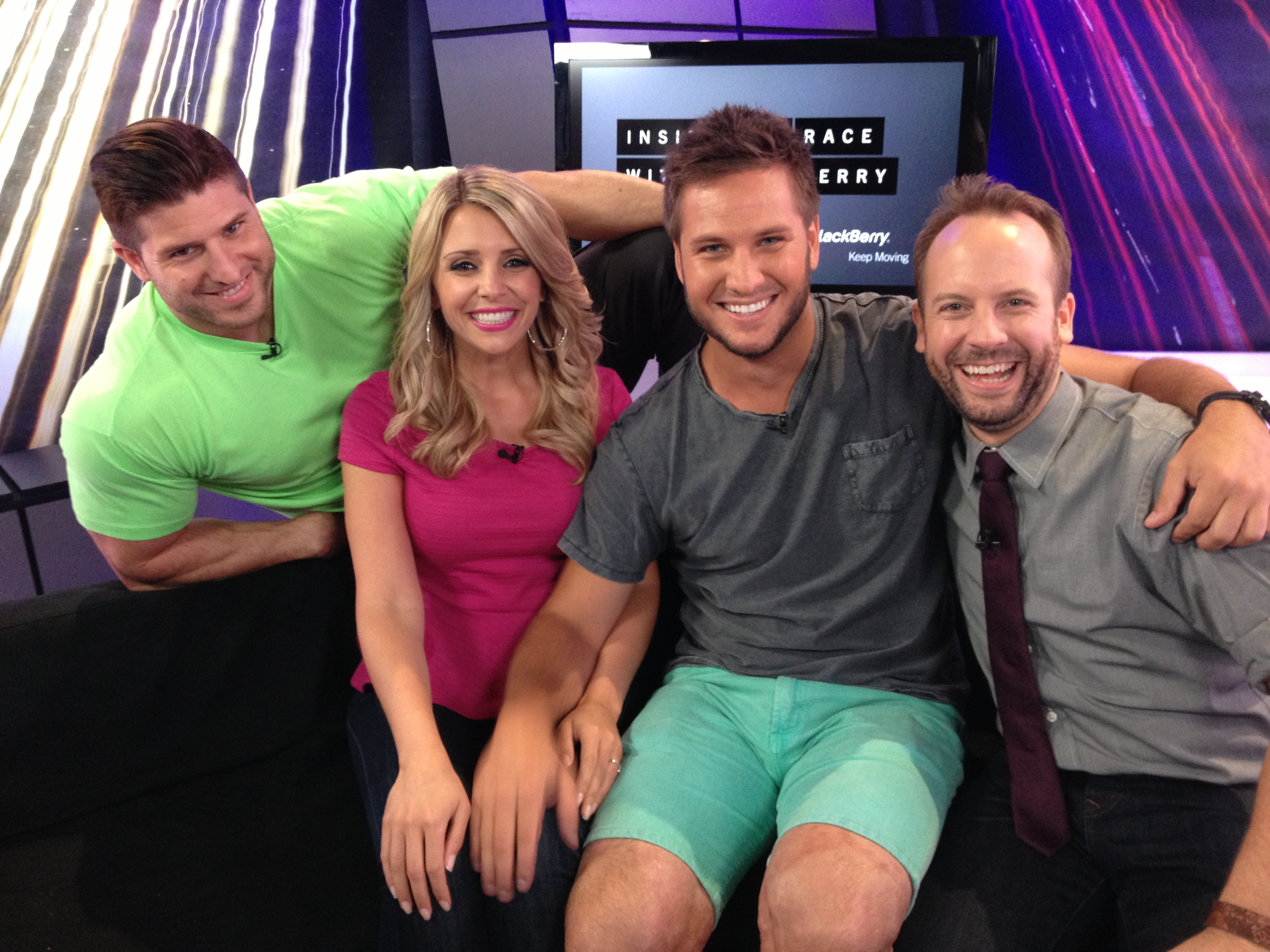
Jet Black and Dave Schram from The Amazing Race Canada 1 and The Amazing Race Canada 7 with Danielle McGimsie and Teddy Wilson

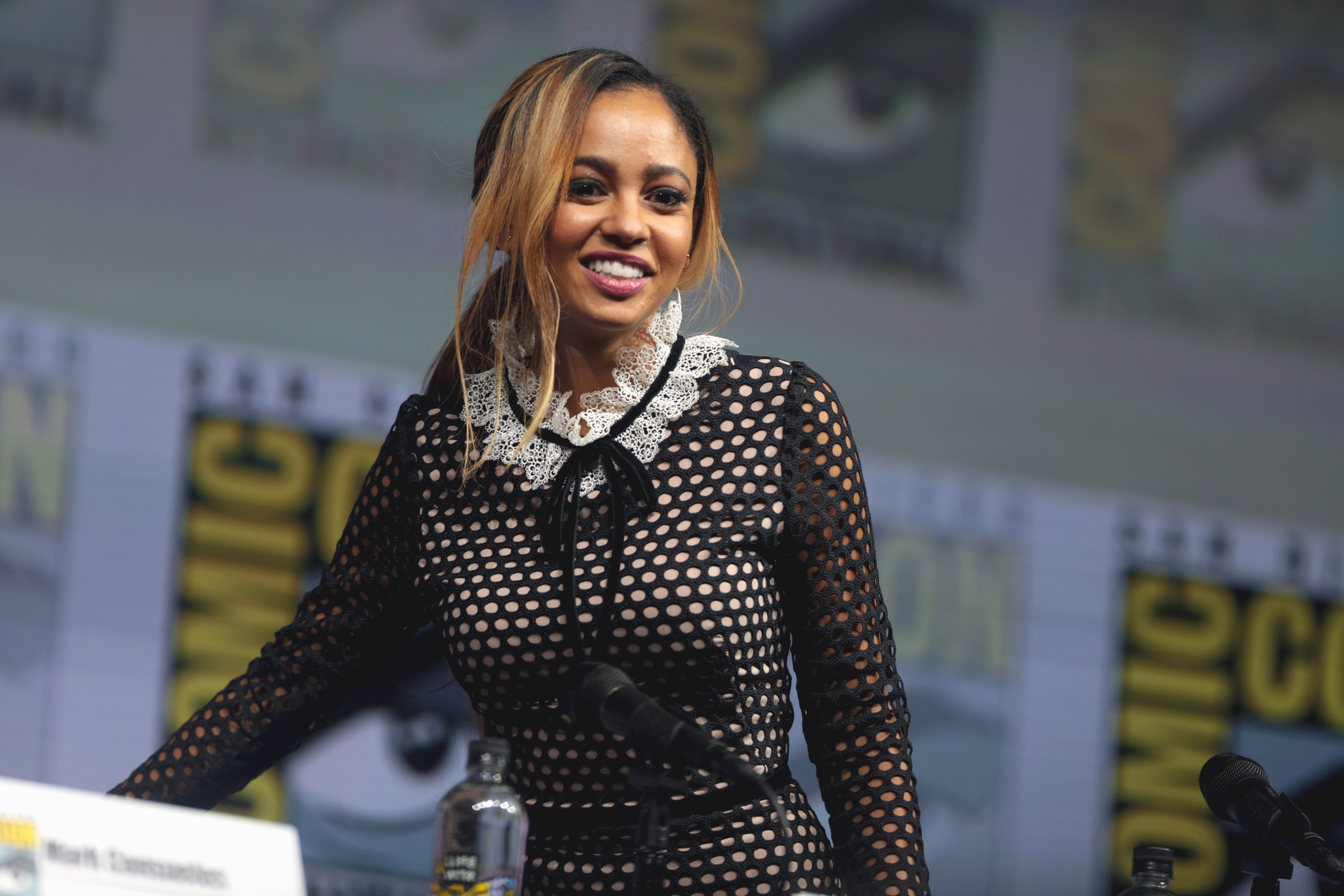
Vanessa Morgan from The Amazing Race Canada 1

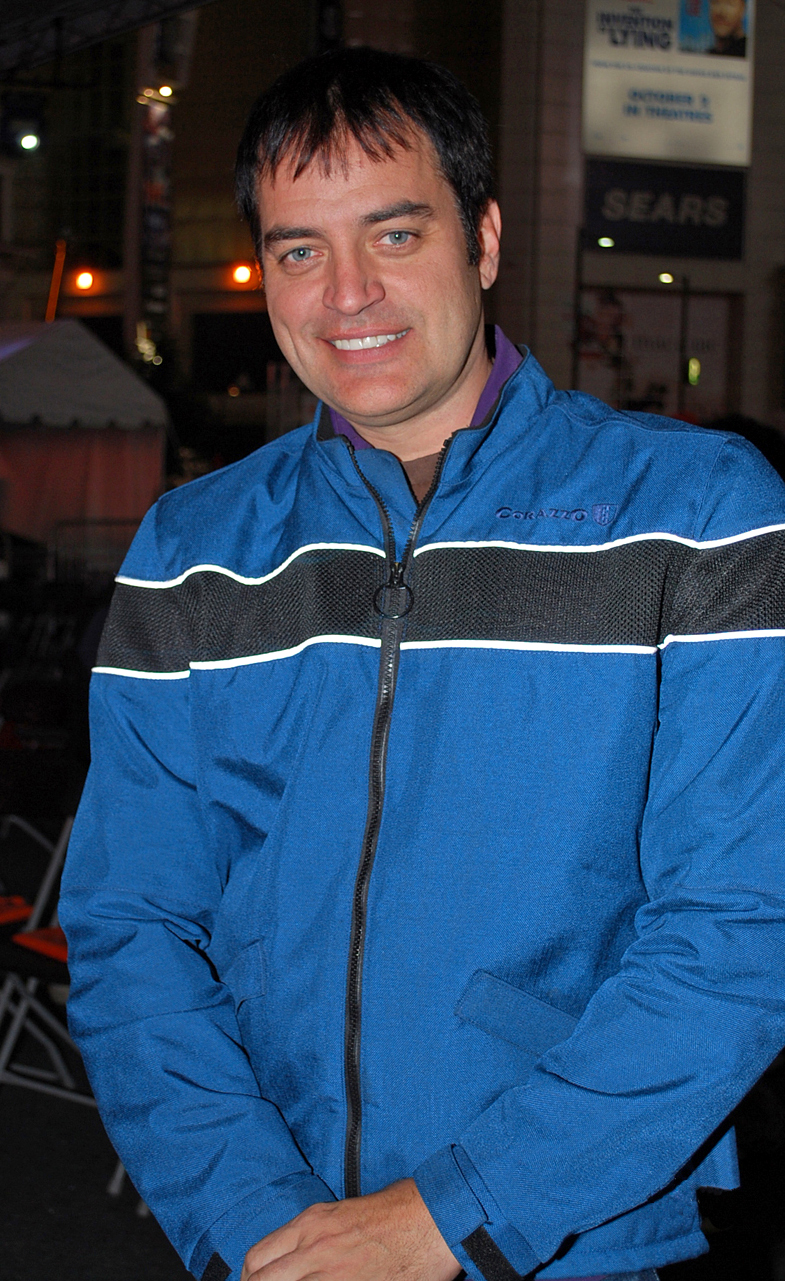
Rex Harrington from The Amazing Race Canada 2

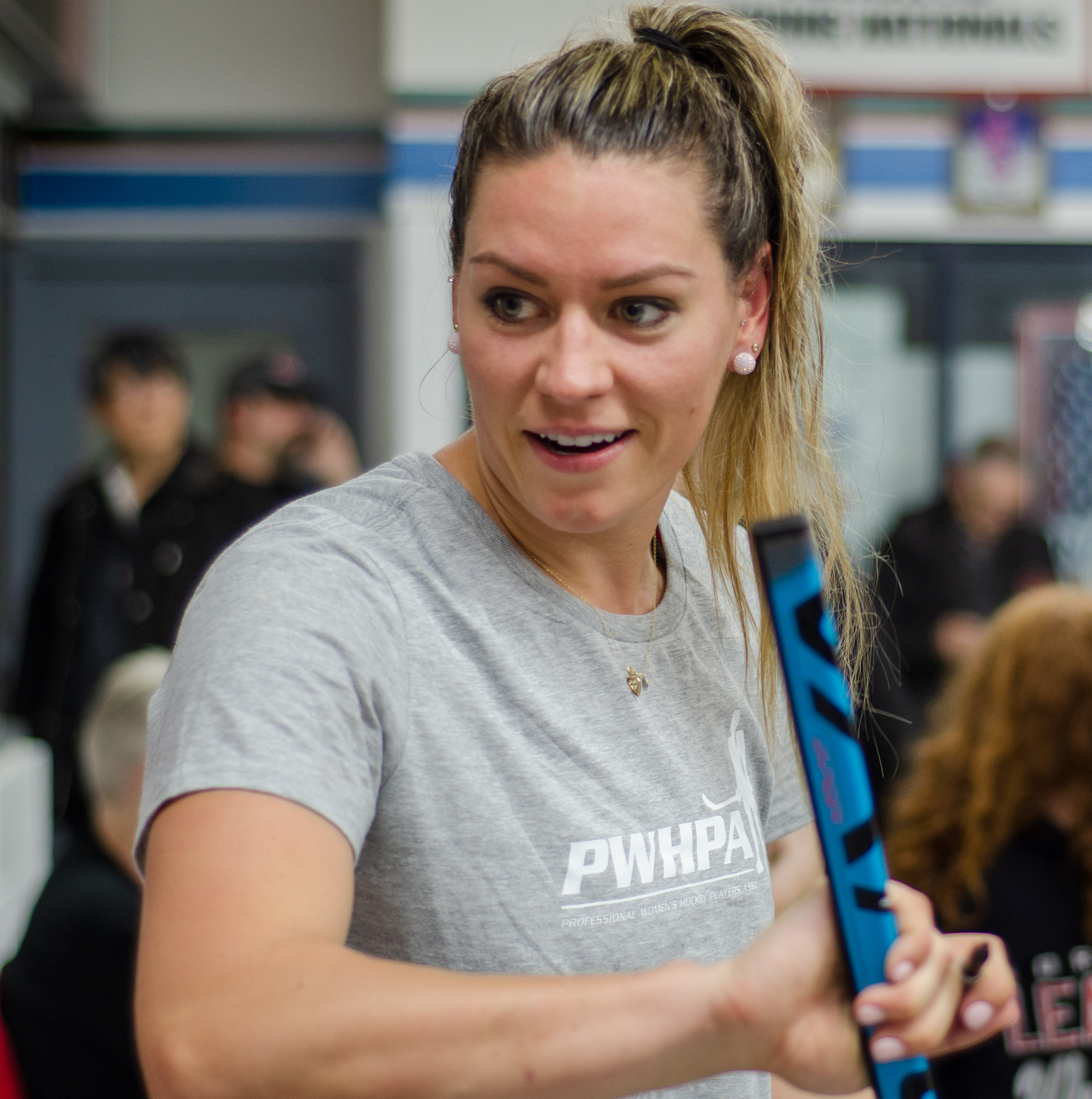
Natalie Spooner from The Amazing Race Canada 2

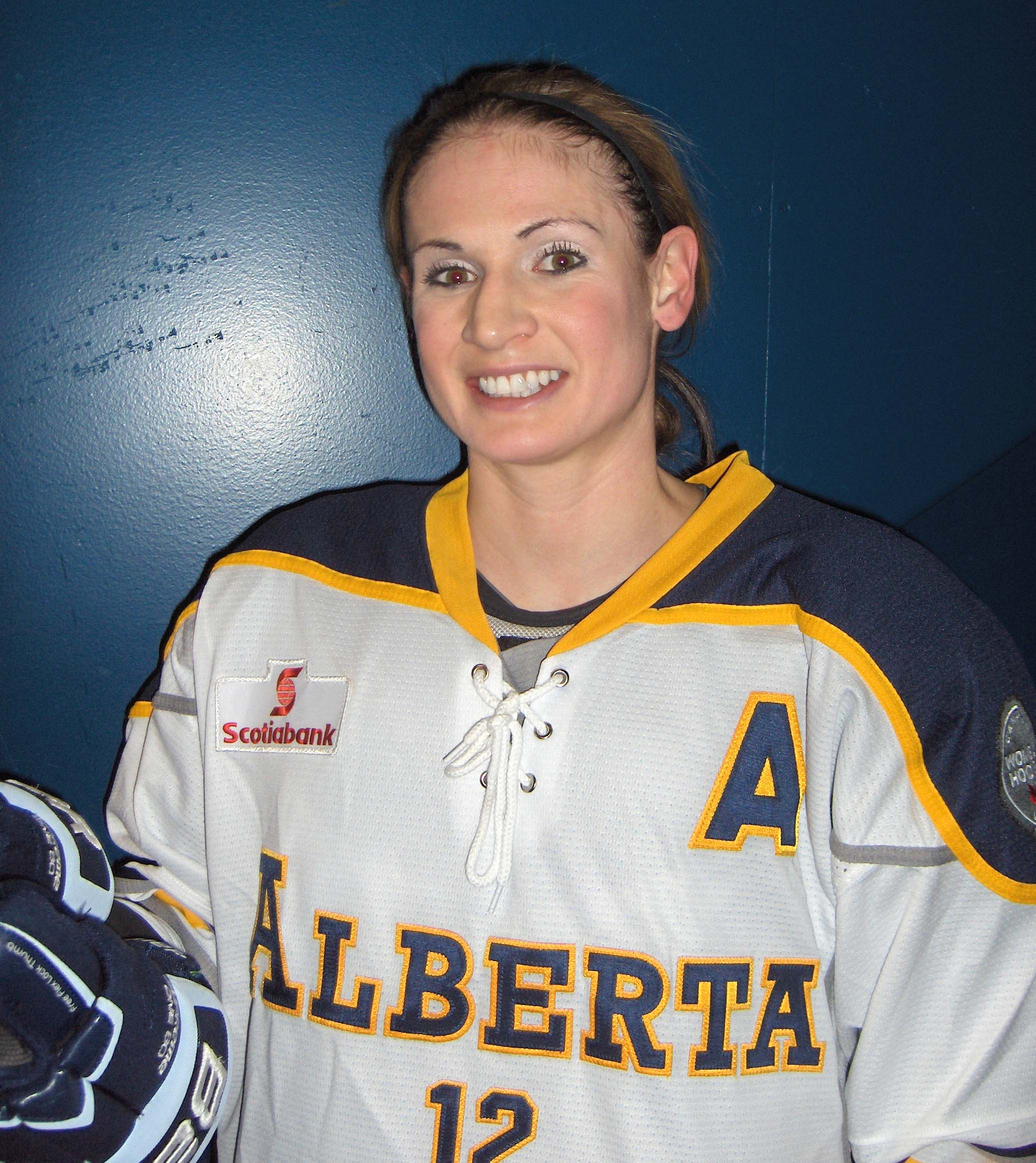
Meaghan Mikkelson from The Amazing Race Canada 2

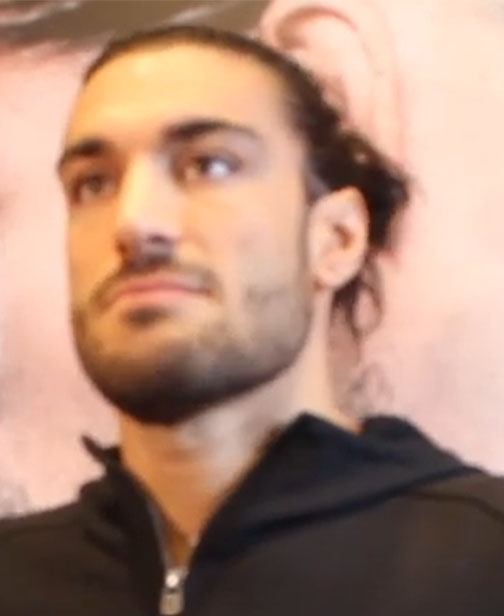
Elias Theodorou from The Amazing Race Canada 3

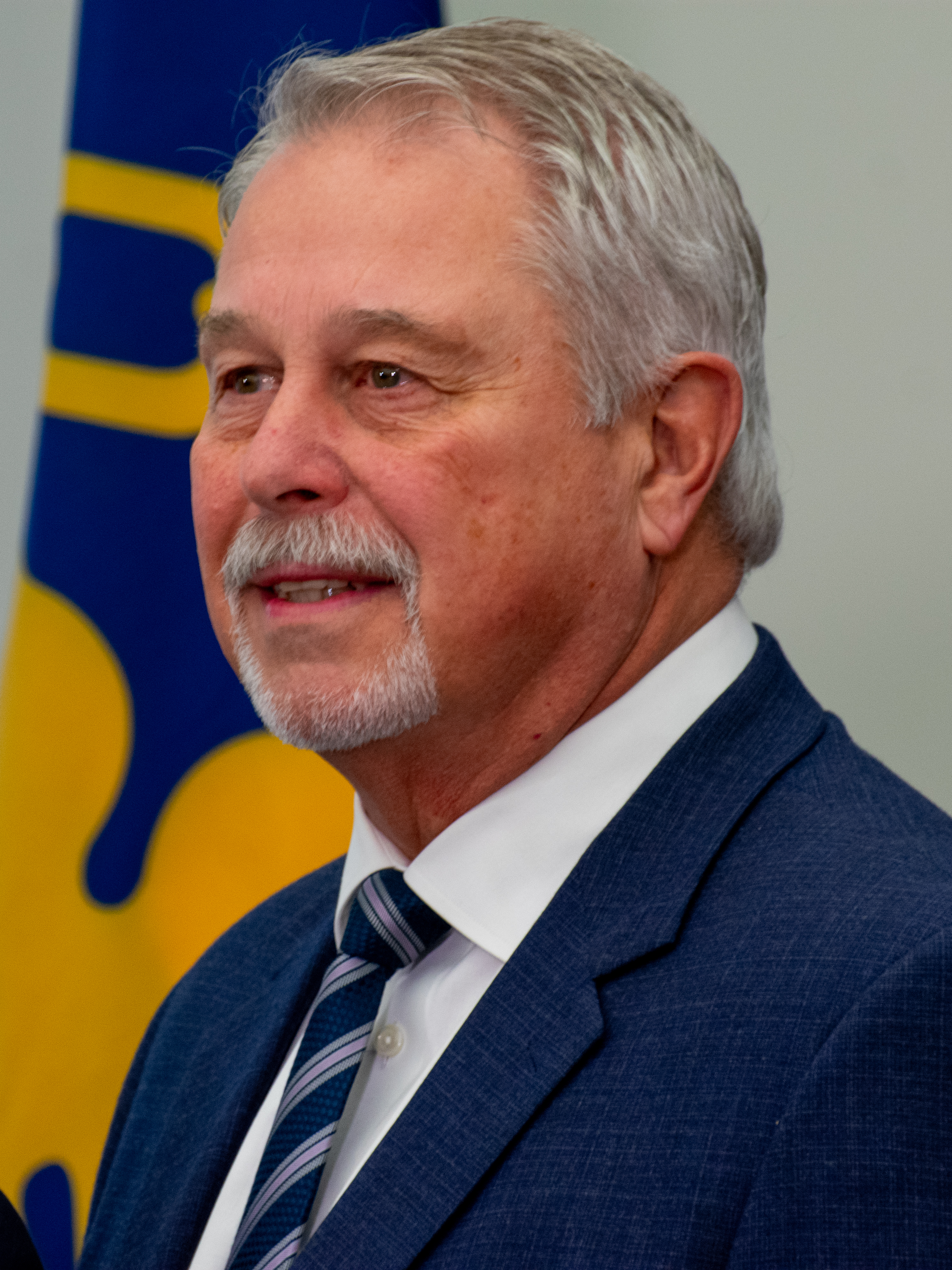
Neil Lumsden from The Amazing Race Canada 3

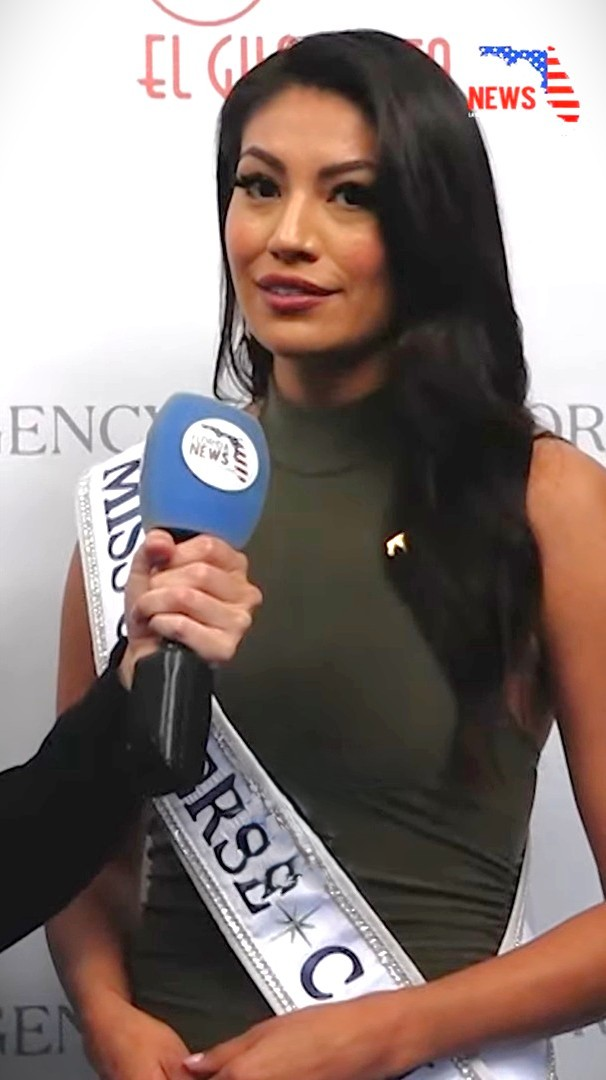
Ashley Callingbull-Burnham from The Amazing Race Canada 4

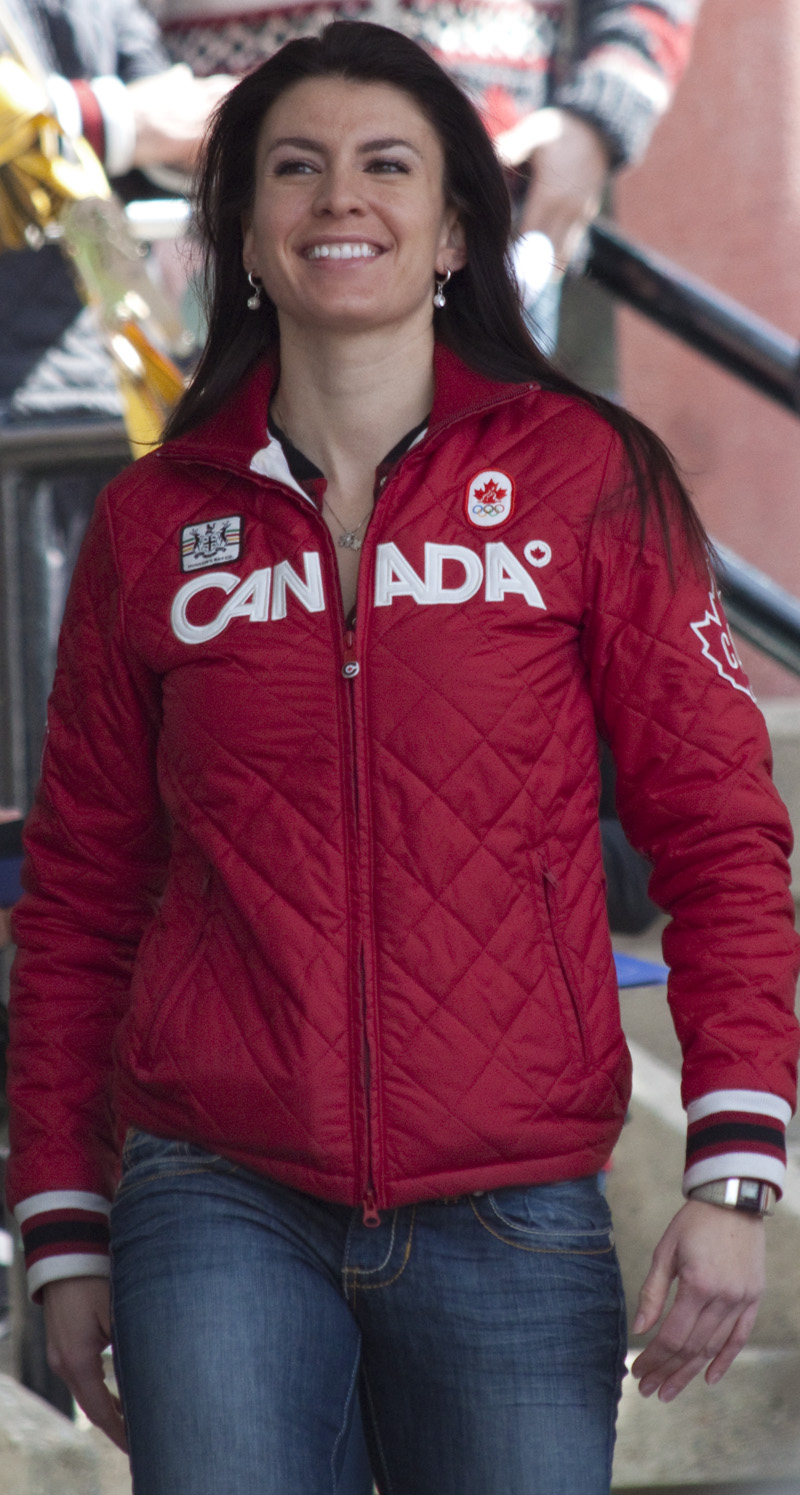
Mellisa Hollingsworth from The Amazing Race Canada 6

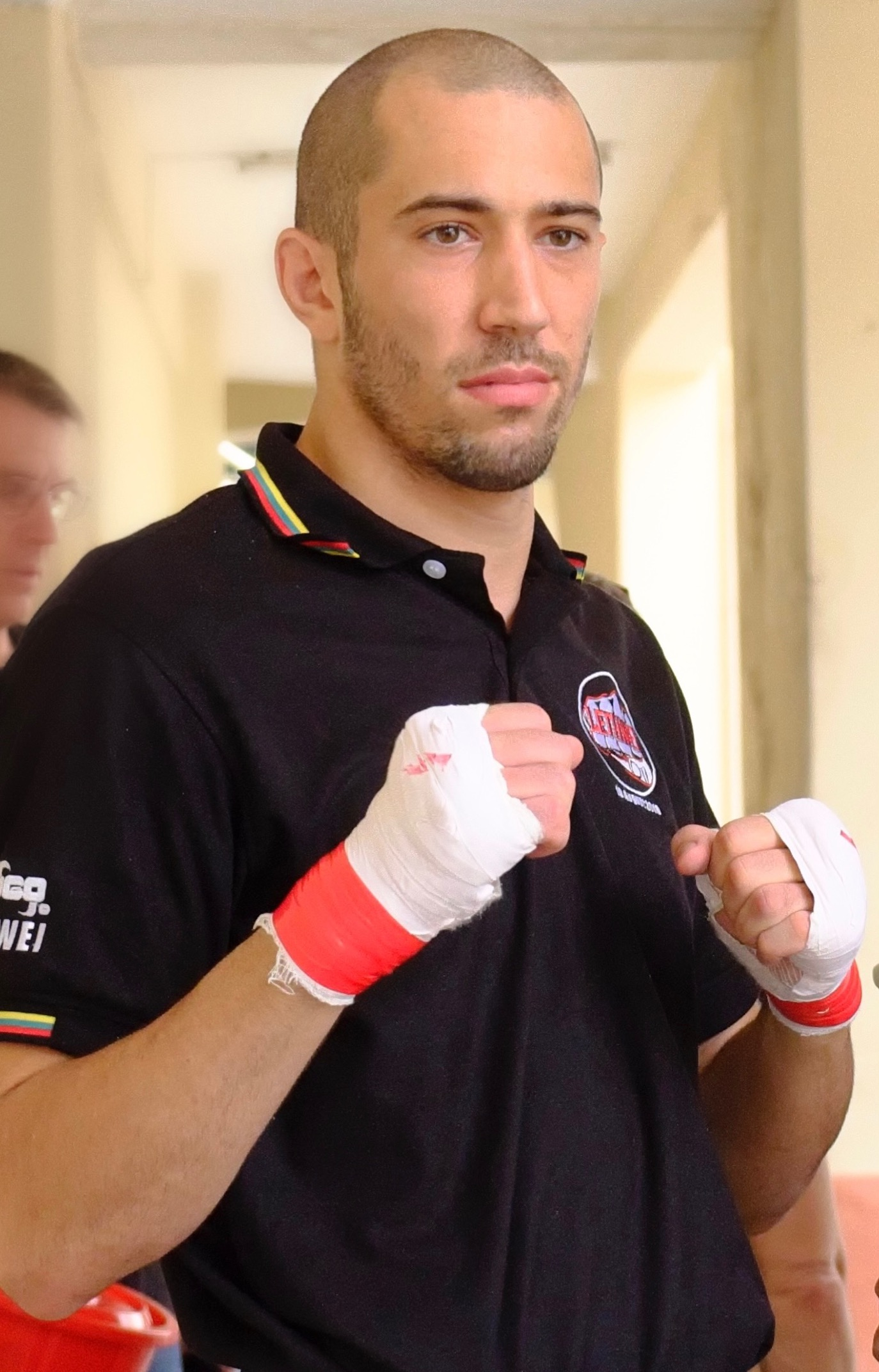
Dave Leduc from The Amazing Race Canada 7

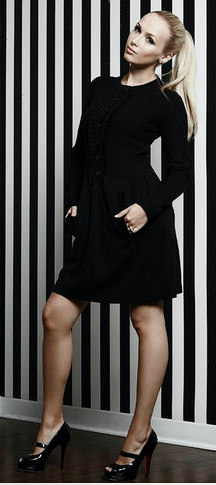
Irina Terehova from The Amazing Race Canada 7

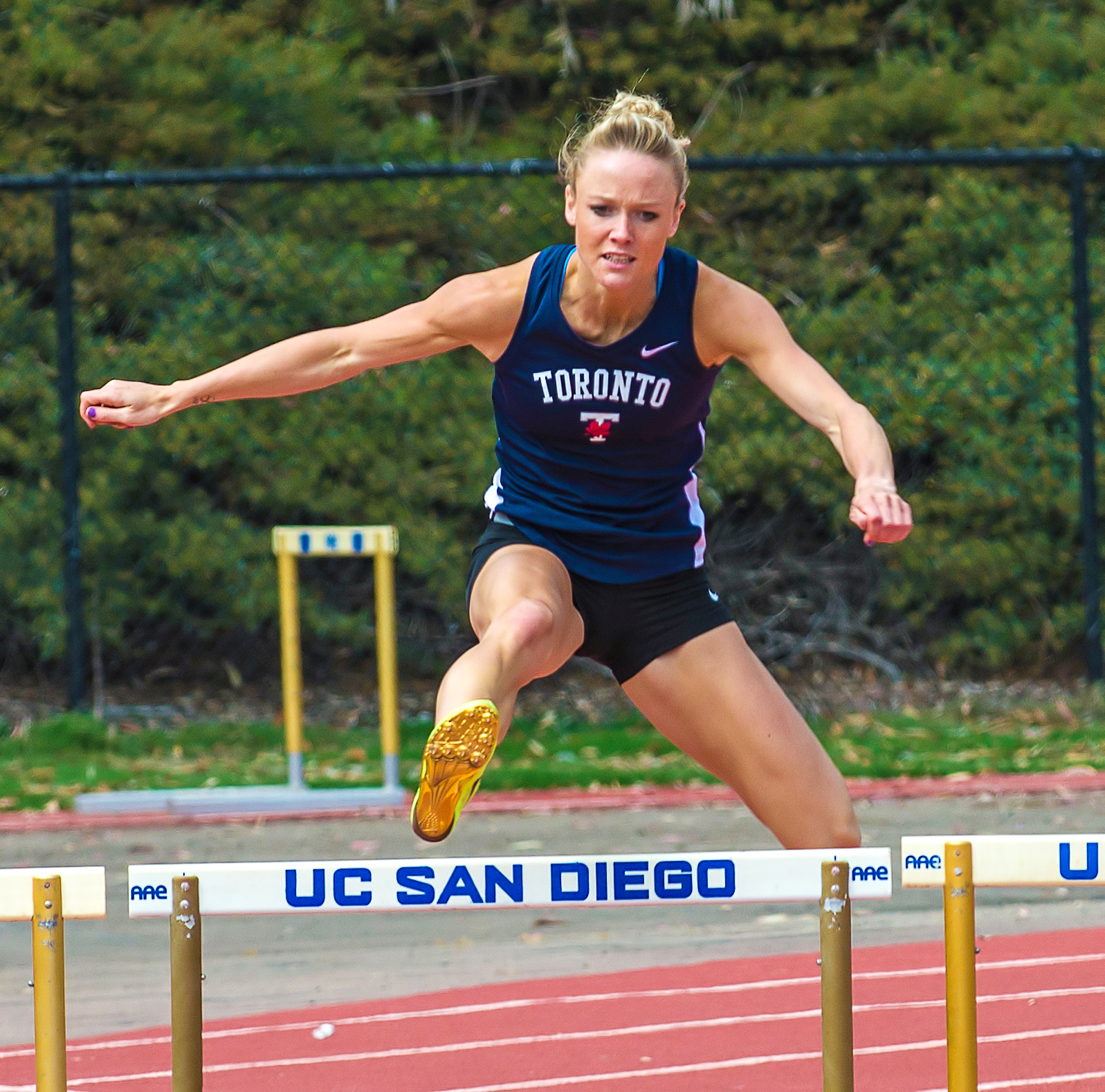
Sarah Wells from The Amazing Race Canada 7

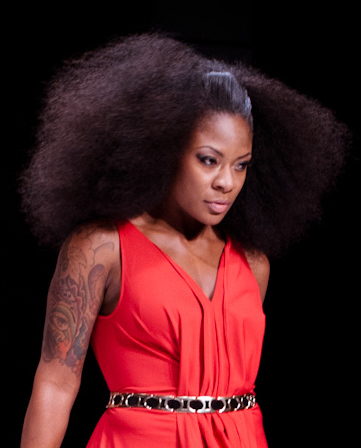
Jully Black from The Amazing Race Canada 8

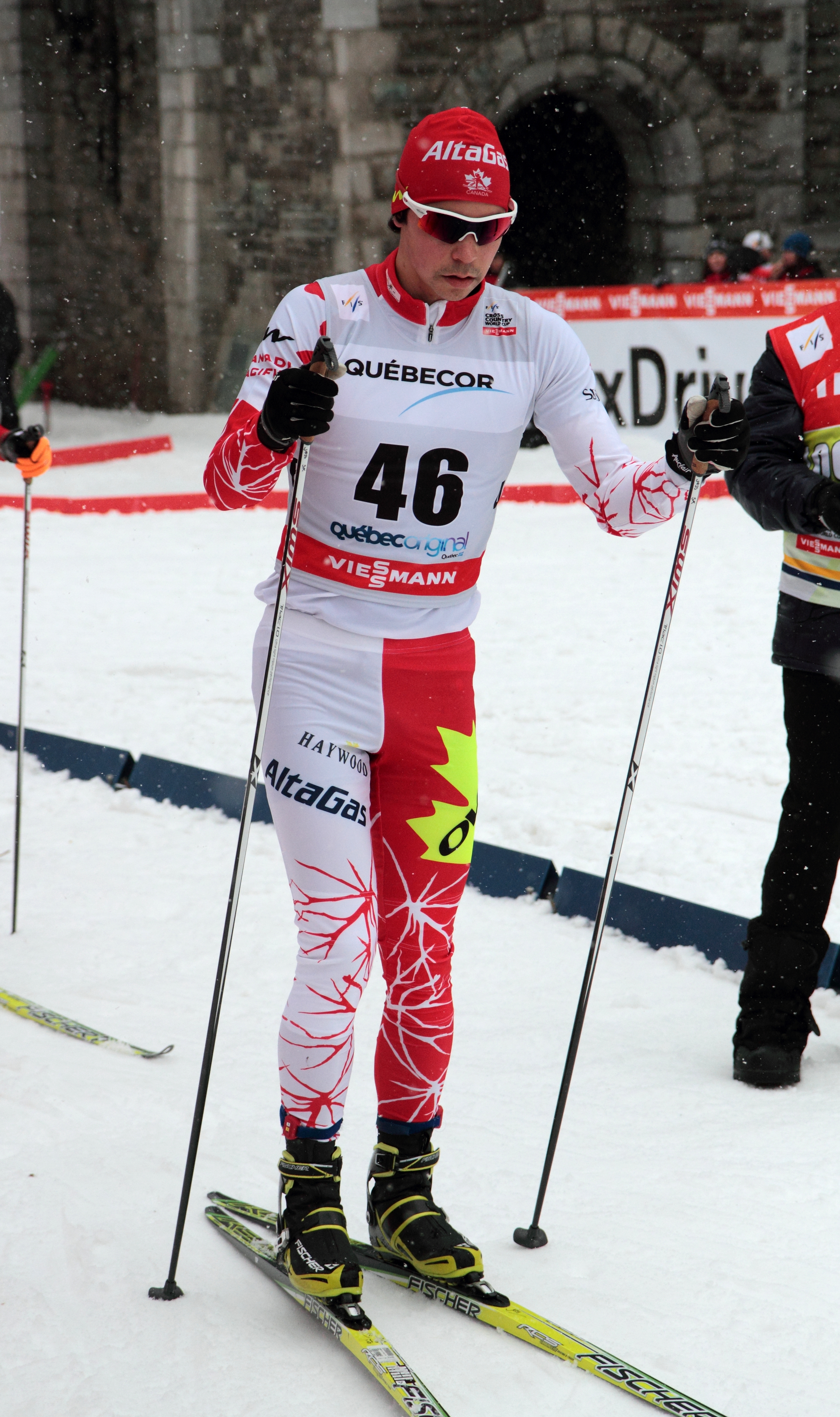
Jesse Cockney from The Amazing Race Canada 8

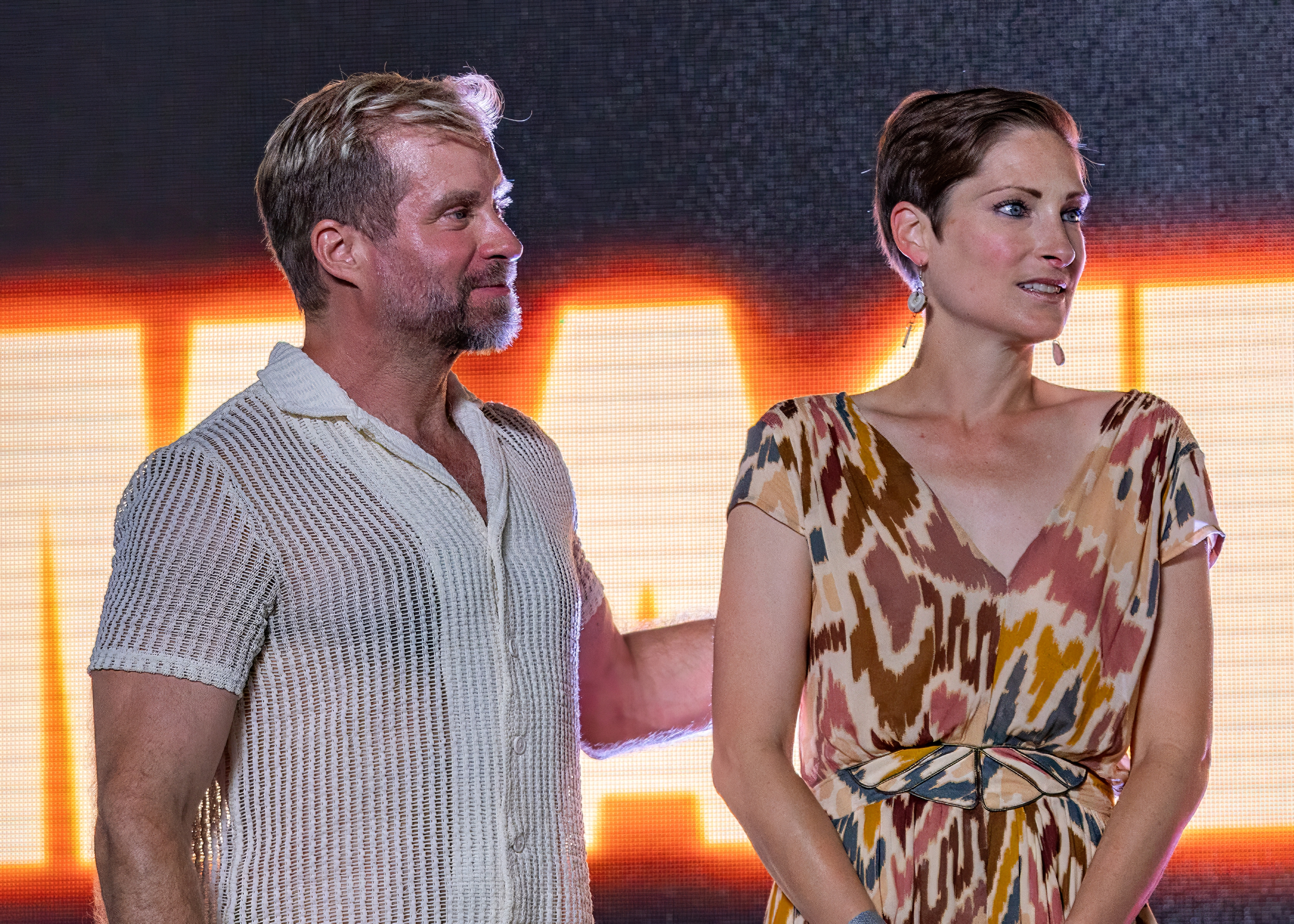
Craig Ramsay and Catherine Wreford from The Amazing Race Canada 8

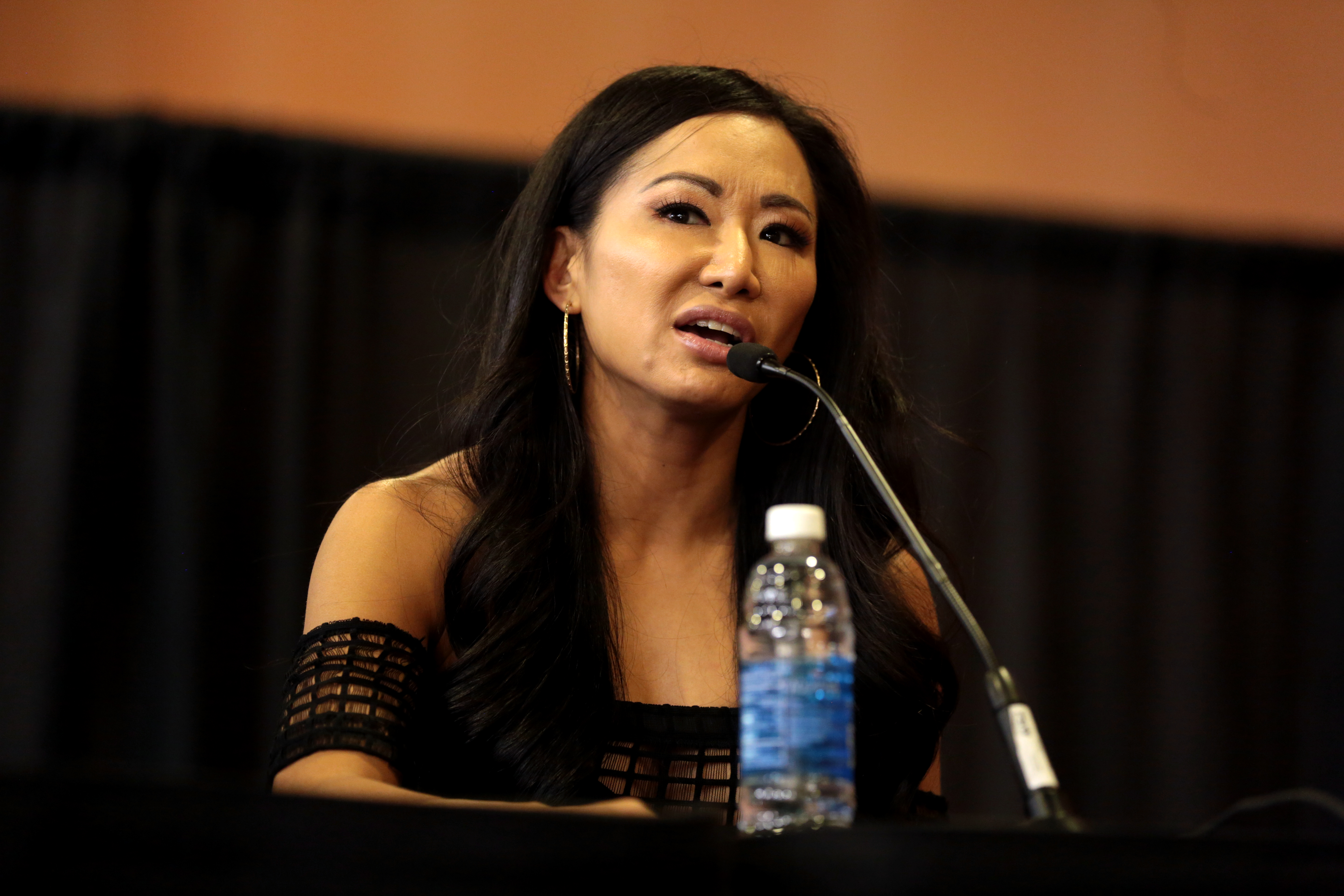
Gail Kim from The Amazing Race Canada 9

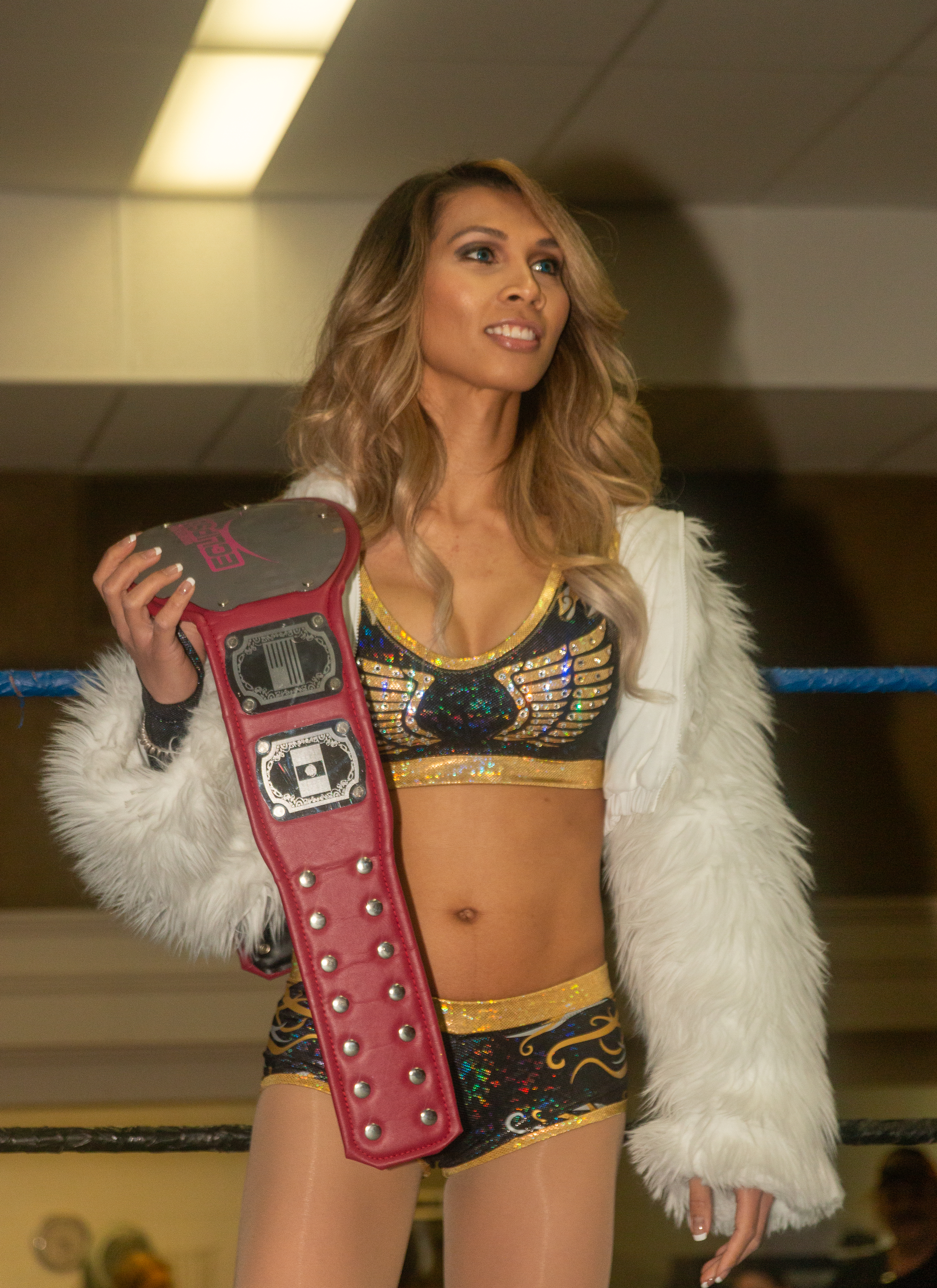
Gisele Shaw from The Amazing Race Canada 9

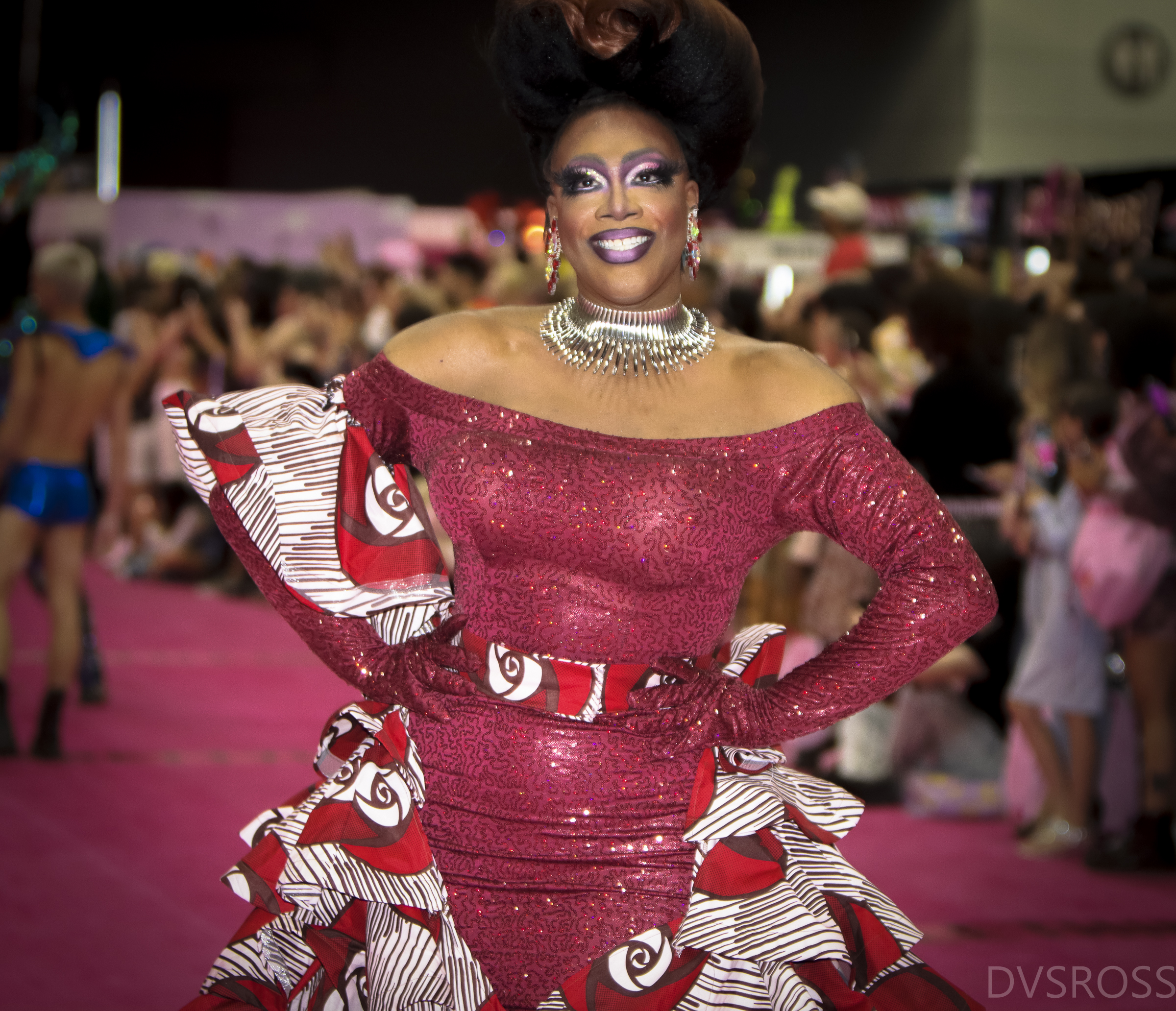
Kimora Amour from The Amazing Race Canada 9

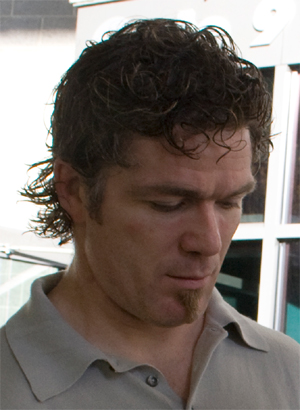
Brad May from The Amazing Race Canada 10

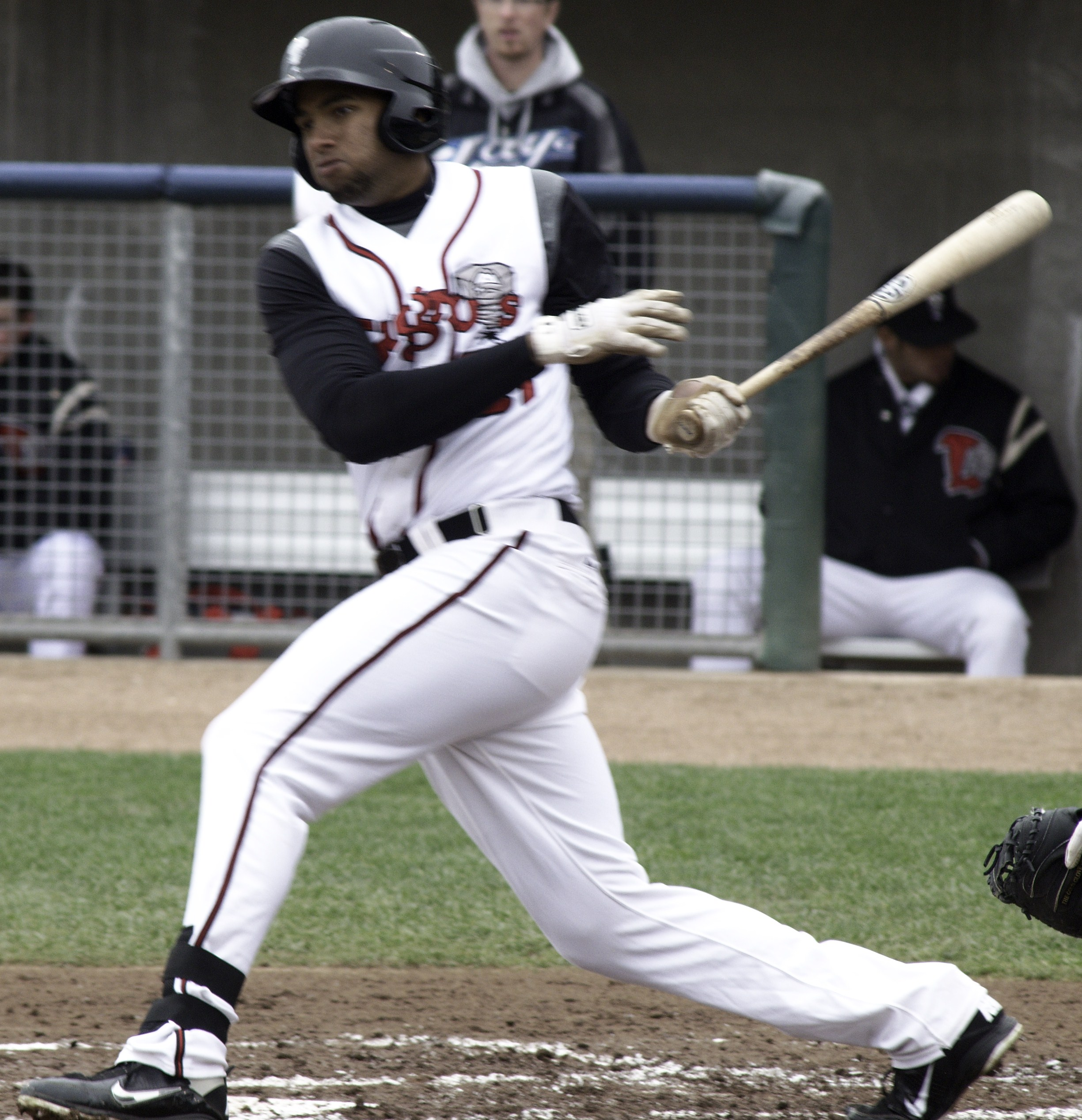
Michael Crouse from The Amazing Race Canada 10

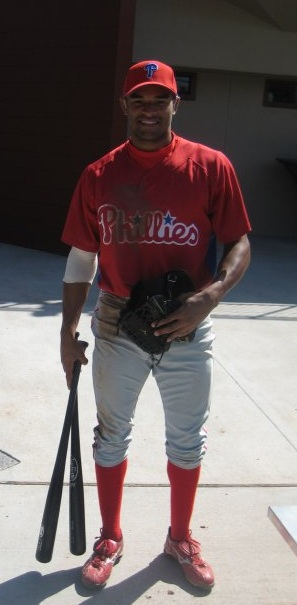
Tyson Gillies from The Amazing Race Canada 10

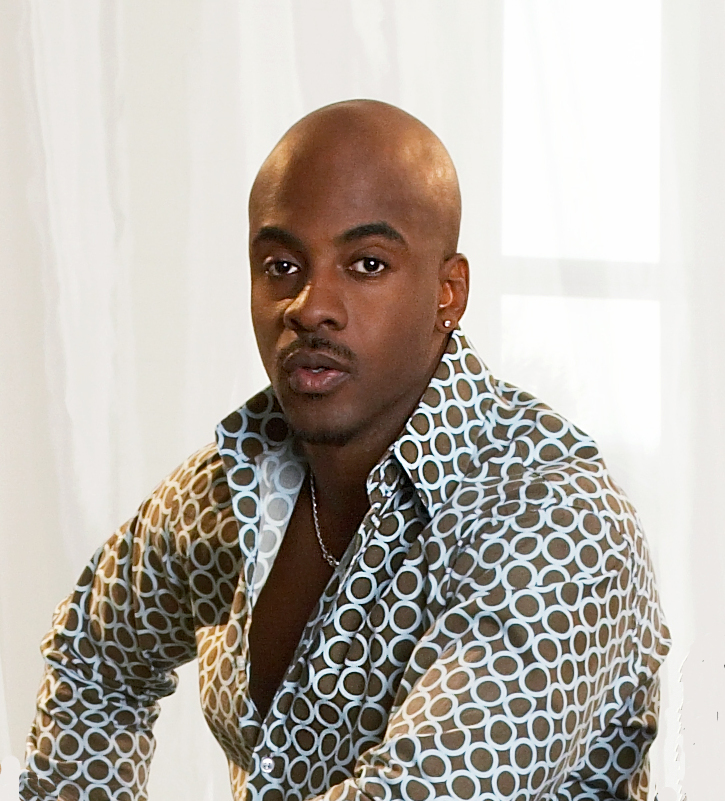
Maestro Fresh Wes from The Amazing Race Canada 12
