= Narcity Media =

Canadian online media company

Narcity Media Inc.
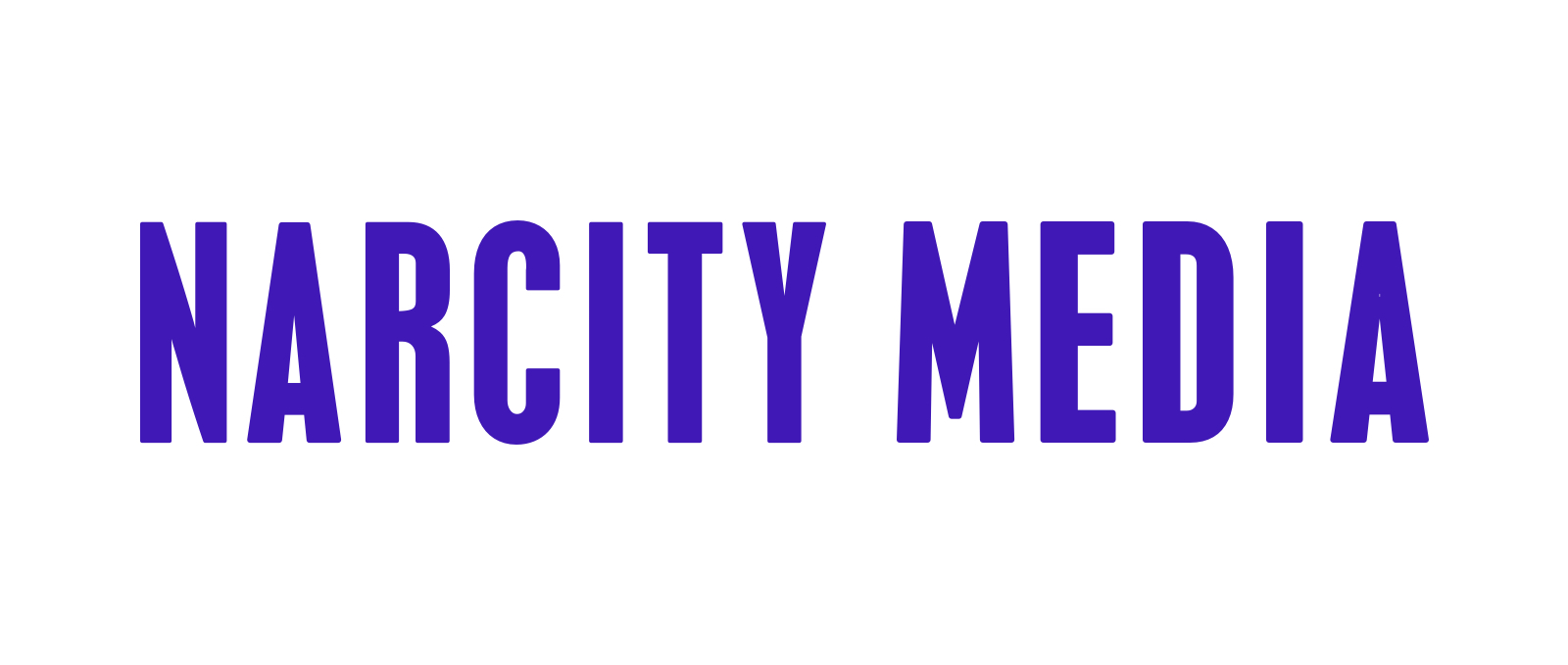
- Formerly: MTL Blog Inc. (2013–2015)
- Company type: Private
- Industry: Media; Advertising; Computer software Technology
- Founded: 2013; 13 years ago in Montreal, Quebec, Canada
- Founders: Charles Lapointe; Joshua McRae
- Headquarters: Toronto, Ontario, Canada
- Key people: Charles Lapointe (CEO) Érik Desjardins (Ex-CTO); Adrian Borowski (Ex-COO) Chrjapin Kelly J. (Ex-CFO)
- Services: Online services
- Website: www.narcitymedia.com

Narcity Media Inc. is a Canadian online media company that owns and operates Narcity and MTL Blog. The company was founded in Montreal, Quebec in 2013 as MTL Blog Inc., and converted into Narcity in 2016 when it expanded into the rest of Canada. Narcity Media is headquartered in Toronto, Ontario and maintains an office in Montreal. The company focuses on creating content for millennials and Gen Z in both Canada and the United States.

== History ==
In 2013, the company was created as MTL Blog Inc. and focused on creating content for millennials in Montreal.

In 2014, the company started offering sponsored content to its clients rather than just display advertising. This generated some controversy with some users pointing out editorials that were labeled as sponsored. In 2015, MTL Blog Inc. was renamed to Narcity Media Inc. and the agency division was created to cater to both brands.

In 2016, the company expanded to Vancouver and across the rest of Canada. It also partnered with Telefilm Canada in October 2016 to distribute a video series featuring Canadian celebrities such as Charlotte Cardin and Kardinal Offishall.

In 2016, the company launched an "Anti-Ad Blocking" feature on all of its websites, forcing users to either whitelist the website or login through Facebook.

In 2019, Narcity Media expanded its offerings to the United States, creating Narcity USA, where content is being published in many states, including Georgia, Florida and Texas.

In 2020, Narcity partnered with Interac to distribute a video series featuring small businesses across Canada. This campaign was selected as a finalist at the Digiday Content Marketing Award in the category of ‘Best Use of Native Advertising/ Sponsored Content’.

In 2021, the company inked its biggest sponsored content deal to date with Mazda, for a cross-country campaign.

== Technology ==
Formerly powered by an internal CMS called Lilium CMS. As of April 2021, the company merged to the RebelMouse CMS.
