= MTL Blog =

Canadian news website

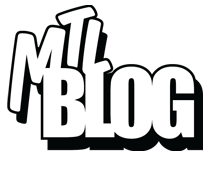
- Website type: Social, Local, Blog, News
- Available in: English
- Headquarters: Montreal, Quebec, Canada
- Area served: Canada
- Owner: Narcity Media
- Editor: Ali Millington
- Services: Entertainment, gossip, lifestyle, culture, comedy, women's interest and local news.
- Website: mtlblog.com
- Commercial: Yes
- Registration: Optional
- Launched: 2012
- Current status: Active

MTL Blog is a Montreal-based digital publisher founded in 2012 by Charles Lapointe and Joshua McRae and owned by Narcity Media. The site features local, provincial, and Canadian news and stories, and showcases activities to do in and around the city of Montreal.

== History ==
MTLBlog.com was initially launched in 2012 by Charles Lapointe and Joshua McRae as a website focused on nightlife photography and parties in Montreal.

In 2013, the website incorporated into MTL Blog Inc. and started creating more content in style of listicles that were local, and some more generic. MTL Blog's first office was located in Montreal, Quebec on Saint Laurent Boulevard.

In 2014 and 2015, the blog's popularity flourished by creating more provocative content and focusing on local listicles.

== Controversy ==
Between 2013 and 2014, the blog a was accused of "everything from stealing their content to sensationalizing the news to getting basic facts wrong in their reporting." MTL Blog was notably criticized for accepting money in exchange for content. As a result, a number of mock websites had appeared as well as the #stopmtlblog movement on social media. Most of the spoof websites were taken down on the count of trademark and copyright infringements.

In 2015, MTL Blog writer Irina Tee wrote multiple provocative articles about relationships and dating. She was criticised for allegedly supporting misogyny and became the subject of multiple petitions and an open-letter demanding her suspension from her writing position at MTL Blog was posted on The Link, thus creating controversy for the website.

In 2016, the website published two lists featuring the “hottest” women and men at Concordia University in Canada. The Concordian accused the website of contributing to the objectification of men and women and referred to the article as "a scene straight out of Mean Girls". The Concordian blacklisted the website and called upon the students to fully boycott it.
