= Cheese Factory Corner =

Locality in Nova Scotia, Canada

Coordinates: 45.082°N 63.649°W

Cheese Factory Corner is an unincorporated locality in the Canadian province of Nova Scotia, located in Hants County. It is named after a cheese factory that operated there for 6 years, between 1892 and 1898. Local farmers would hold shares in the factory, and would bring their milk to nearby Gore for processing into cheese. It was known as the Little River Cheese Manufacturing Company.

The area is now part of Upper Nine Mile River.
