= Sigga Kling =

- Born: Sigríður Klingenberg; 1967 (age 57–58); Iceland
- Occupations: Astrologer, fortune teller
- Years active: 1990s–present
- Notable work: Weekly horoscopes

Sigga Kling (born 1967) is an Icelandic astrologer, spiritual advisor, and media personality. She has become a prominent cultural figure across Iceland due to her astrology columns and televised appearances and is widely known in Iceland as a witch and a seer.

== Career ==
Kling began her public career in the 1990s and quickly rose to national recognition through her horoscopes. Kling has been regular contributor to Morgunblaðið the most popular website in Iceland, where she publishes horoscopes and lifestyle forecasts. She is also a regular astrology contributor to Vísir, where her horoscopes are published monthly.

She has officiated numerous symbolic weddings and spiritual ceremonies, including a 2023 beach wedding ceremony for Canadian-Burmese martial artist Dave Leduc and Irina Terehova in stormy Icelandic weather. The ceremony took place at Álftanesfjara, a sacred beach facing Snæfellsjökull. Kling is referred to by many as a witch due to her spiritual practices and eccentric style. Throughout her career, Kling has met with numerous dignitaries and celebrities including the King of Sweden and singer-actor Harry Belafonte.
