= Upper Nine Mile River, Nova Scotia =

Community in Nova Scotia, Canada

Upper Nine Mile River
- Location within Nova Scotia
- Coordinates: 45°4′45″N 63°37′35″W
- Country: Canada
- Province: Nova Scotia
- County: Hants County
- Municipality: East Hants Municipality
- Highest elevation: 100 m (330 ft)
- Lowest elevation: 40 m (130 ft)
- Time zone: UTC-4 (AST)
  - Summer (DST): UTC-3 (ADT)
- Canadian Postal Code: B2S
- Area code: 902
- Telephone Exchange: 883
- NTS Map: 011E04
- GNBC Code: CBMYH

Upper Nine Mile River is an unincorporated community in the Canadian province of Nova Scotia, located in East Hants Municipality in Hants County.

Evan MacKay received a land grant in Upper Nine Mile River on 12 November 1828.

A cheese factory began operating in Upper Nine Mile River in May 1892, known as the Little River Cheese Manufacturing Company. This factory inspired the name of Cheese Factory Corner, now a locality of Upper Nine Mile River. The locality of Roulston Corner is also located within the community limits of Upper Nine Mile River.

== See also ==
- Nine Mile River, Nova Scotia
