= West Gore, Nova Scotia =

Community in Nova Scotia, Canada

West Gore
- Location within Nova Scotia
- Coordinates: 45°5′37″N 63°46′44″W
- Country: Canada
- Province: Nova Scotia
- County: Hants County
- Municipality: East Hants Municipality
- Highest elevation: 200 m (660 ft)
- Lowest elevation: 50 m (160 ft)
- Time zone: UTC-4 (AST)
  - Summer (DST): UTC-3 (ADT)
- Canadian Postal Code: B0N 2N0
- Area code: 902
- Telephone Exchange: 883
- NTS Map: 011E04
- GNBC Code: CBOEX

West Gore is an unincorporated community in the Canadian province of Nova Scotia, located in East Hants Municipality in Hants County.

West Gore is a rural area. Once a thriving mining community, it is now mostly home to few farms and very few businesses.

== See also ==
- East Gore, Nova Scotia
- Gore, Nova Scotia
