= East Gore, Nova Scotia =

Community in Nova Scotia, Canada

East Gore
- Location in Nova Scotia
- Coordinates: 45°6′59″N 63°41′0″W
- Country: Canada
- Province: Nova Scotia
- County: Hants County
- Municipality: East Hants Municipality
- Time zone: UTC-4 (AST)
  - Summer (DST): UTC-3 (ADT)
- Canadian Postal Code: B2S
- Area code: 902
- Telephone Exchange: 883
- NTS Map: 011E04
- GNBC Code: CAKSL

East Gore is an unincorporated community in the Canadian province of Nova Scotia, located in East Hants Municipality in Hants County. The locality of Grant Valley is located within the community limits of East Gore.

== History ==
The area including the present-day community of East Gore was settled in 1759 as part of the Douglas Township. Gore was named for Sir Charles Stephen Gore, deputy quartermaster general of Canada during the rebellion of 1837.

East Gore is home to Courthouse Hill (formerly Judgement Hill), named for a courthouse which stood on the hill for 90 years or more and was destroyed by fire on July 22, 1956. The hill is now the site of a monument and scenic point where the counties of Hants, Kings, Colchester, Cumberland and Pictou are visible.

== See also ==
- West Gore, Nova Scotia
- Gore, Nova Scotia
