= Nine Mile River, Nova Scotia =

Community in Nova Scotia, Canada

Nine Mile River
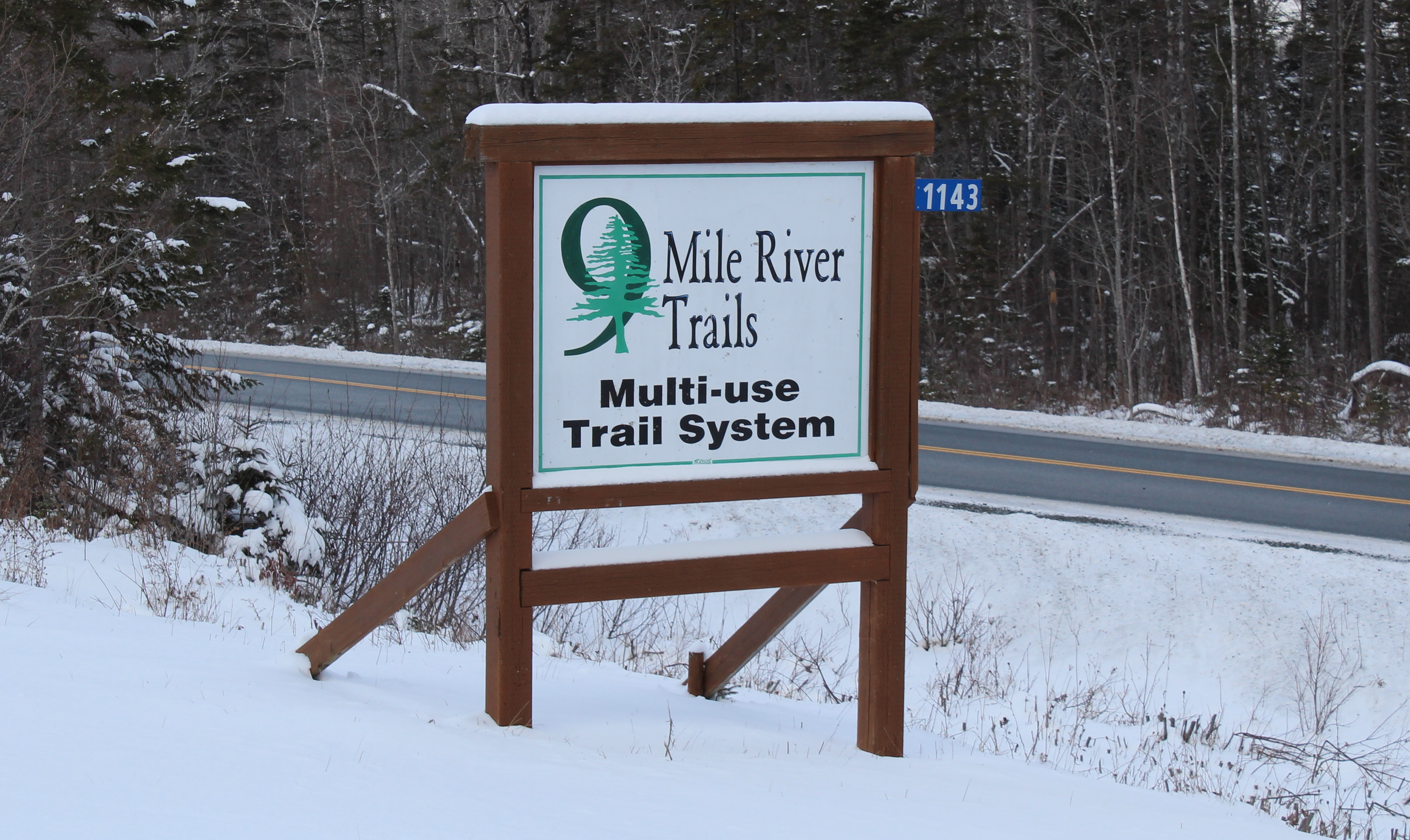
- Nine Mile River Trails sign

- Location in Nova Scotia
- Coordinates: 45°2′30″N 63°34′37″W
- Country: Canada
- Province: Nova Scotia
- County: Hants County
- Municipality: East Hants Municipality
- Time zone: UTC-4 (AST)
  - Summer (DST): UTC-3 (ADT)
- Canadian Postal Code: B2S
- Area code: 902
- Telephone Exchange: 883
- NTS Map: 011E04
- GNBC Code: CBBOW

Nine Mile River is an unincorporated community in the Canadian province of Nova Scotia, located in East Hants Municipality in Hants County. It takes its name from the river which flows through it. Nine Mile River is District 3 for the Municipality of East Hants, served by Councillor Eldon Hebb. Nine Mile River is home to a small United Church and a volunteer fire department.

== History ==
The Mi'kmaq referred to Nine Mile River as "Nenadoogweboogwek" and "Wokumeak", meaning "the trail route". In 1797, the area had a small settlement of about 30 highland veterans who later received a land grant there on 5 March 1816. They were joined by Evan MacKay, who received a grant of 400 acres in Upper Nine Mile River on 12 November 1828, and Sir Alexander Inglis Cochrane, who received a grant in Nine Mile River on 18 May 1830.

Nine Mile River had a new church in July 1823. A Presbyterian church was built in the community in 1865, and replaced in 1884. The schoolhouse in the lower district of Nine Mile River began operating in November 1817, followed by the central district schoolhouse in 1818. These schools were replaced with new structures in Nine Mile River and Upper Nine Mile River in 1894. A new school was again erected in Upper Nine Mile River in 1951.

The area now encompassing Nine Mile River was divided into Lower Nine Mile River and Nine Mile River from 1976 until 2006, when the name "Lower Nine Mile River" was rescinded and the two communities became one. The area of Renfrew, a ghost town known for its gold mining history, became a locality of Nine Mile River in 2007.

== Recreation ==
The Nine Mile River Trails are located within the community limits of Nine Mile River. The multi-use trial system features about 10 km of maintained trails, and opened on 25 October 2013.

The Nine Mile River Community Centre was established in the early 1960s in an effort led by well-known resident Major Thompson. Thompson and his wife donated seven acres of their own land at the end of the Enfield Road to allow for the construction of the community centre when no other suitable property could be found to purchase. Thompson's landscaping company and the community volunteered to prepare the land and lay the foundation. The majority of the community centre was built by donations from the community, bringing the total cost of the structure to CA$4,600. The centre paid off its mortgage within three years with funding from dancies, parties, pantry sales, and other community events. The community centre has hosted the Nine Mile River Country Jamboree since 1966, which they say is the longest-running country jamboree in Canada.

There are two campgrounds within the community limits of Nine Mile River: Renfrew Camping, located on Renfrew Road; and Riverland Campground, located on C.P. Thompson Road.

== Climate ==
=== Average temperatures (°C) ===
Month	Average Temp	Average High	Average Low
January	-5.8	-1.5	-10.3
February	-6.0	-1.5	-10.6
March	-1.7	2.6	-6.1
April	3.6	8.0	-0.9
May	9.4	14.7	4.1
June	14.7	20.1	9.3
July	18.3	23.4	13.2
August	18.1	23.0	13.2
September	13.8	18.7	9.0
October	8.5	13.0	4.0
November	3.2	7.0	-0.6
December	-3.0	1.2	-7.2
