= Irina Terehova =

Canadian model and reality television personality

- Ирина Терехова
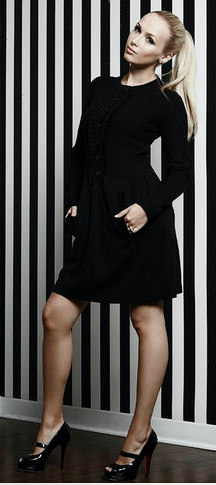
- Born: 13 April 1989 (age 37); Kishinev, Moldavian SSR, Soviet Union (Chișinău, Moldova)
- Other name: Irina Tee
- Occupations: Writer; actor; fashion model
- Years active: 2004–present
- Spouse: Dave Leduc (m. 2016)
- Children: 2
- Modelling information
- Height: 1.78 m (5 ft 10 in)
- Hair colour: Blonde
- Eye colour: Hazel

Irina Terehova (Russian: Ирина Терехова; born 13 April 1989) is a Moldovan-Canadian model and reality television personality. Terehova immigrated from Moldova to Canada at the age of twelve. From 2015 to 2016, she first gained notoriety as a writer for the Montreal news website MTL Blog. In 2016, she married Lethwei World Champion fighter Dave Leduc in a nationally televised wedding ceremony in Myanmar. In 2019, she participated in The Amazing Race Canada Season 7 alongside her husband and the couple became the biggest villains of the Canadian television franchise.

== Early life ==
Born in Kishinev, in the Moldavian SSR, republic of the Soviet Union, now Moldova, in 1989 to a modest family of Russian descent. Terehova immigrated in 2001 to Montreal, Quebec, Canada at the age of twelve.

== Career ==
=== Writing ===
In 2015, Terehova started her personal blog where she wrote a piece Things I Hate About Dating And Relationships in Canada. It sparked various debates in worldwide media, especially in Russia and Canada. She gained widespread attention because of her writing style and subjects. The same year she got approached to join the MTL Blog team.

While at MTL Blog under the pseudonym Irina Tee, Terehova wrote multiple provocative articles and listicle about relationships and dating. She received criticism for allegedly supporting misogyny. She later became the subject of requests from readers asking for her demission and an open-letter demanding her suspension from her writing position at MTL Blog was posted on The Link, thus making her even more popular online. In 2017, Terehova became a guest writer at the now defunct Jetli.com.

=== Modeling ===
In 2004, at 15 years old, Terehova entered a Montreal pageant in Miss Soyuz, reserved for adults and won 1st place. She signed with NEXT Model Management in Montreal and executed modeling contracts for Loreal, La Senza, Escada and Rusk.

In 2009, Terehova was chosen to feature as the race queen in the EA and Ghost Games celebratory video created for the Need for Speed series. Terehova also was featured in the magazine spread for the release of Need for Speed: Shift.

=== Television ===
In 2019, Terehova competed with her husband Dave Leduc on The Amazing Race Canada Season 7. The couple made it clear that they weren't on the show for the prize money nor to make friends; Leduc apparently desired to compete on the show since he was a teenager. Undoubtedly the most controversial seasons of the Canadian franchise, the couple became the most notorious villains the franchise has known, while being practically unbeatable for the entire season. The couple outraged a lot of viewers and were deemed "un-Canadian". They fell out of favour of viewers and fellow racers for their cutthroat way of racing, copying an answer at the Horne Lake Caves Provincial Park and stealing cabs in Yellowknife, Northwest Territories. The couple later revealed receiving death threats when the show aired. They generated a remarkable amount of hate from Canadian viewers for referring to other contestants as peasants.

In the first episode of the season, in Kamloops, British Columbia, the couple quickly stood out and became the season's villains after trash-talking Canada’s Choice Jet & Dave. In the fifth episode, in Nanaimo, Vancouver Island, the remaining contestants teamed up and tried to send the Quebec couple home, but as the couple said, it was a "drastic failure." Despite a well-laid plan against the couple and a record number of penalties taken by multiple teams, it was ultimately the Halifax twins who got eliminated.

Dave and Irina led the charge out of Thunder Bay to Wolfville, Nova Scotia, but faltered at the apple sorting challenge and were eventually the last team to meet host Jon Montgomery at the mat at Luckett Vineyards.

== Personal life ==
In 2016, Terehova met professional fighter Dave Leduc when she took a trip to Thailand. The two had never met before, but after writing a story on him in MTL Blog, Terehova decided to leave Canada and meet him in Phuket. The trip was supposed to last two weeks, but Terehova decided to stay and live with Leduc.

In October 2016, she got engaged to Leduc on the Shwesandaw Pagoda in Bagan. On 13 December 2016, the couple got married in a traditional Burmese wedding ceremony at the Central Hotel in Yangon. The ceremony was broadcast live on national television MRTV with an estimated 30 million viewers, catapulting the couple to celebrity status in Myanmar. In February 2023, Terehova and her husband renewed their wedding vows in Iceland in a ceremony officiated by Icelandic witch Sigga Kling. The couple wore traditional Icelandic national costumes and the ceremony took place at Álftanesfjara, a sacred beach facing Snæfellsjökull. Despite challenging weather conditions, including a yellow weather warning, the couple proceeded with the ceremony.

In 2017, Terehova and her husband started getting involved with children at NLD AIDS center in Yangon, who are infected with HIV/AIDS virus, bringing them chocolate and treats, as well as giving undisclosed donations.

== Filmography ==
Year	Title	Role	Notes
2004	Naked Josh	Hot blonde	Naked Josh at IMDb
2013	In Faustian Fashion	Russian vampire	In Faustian Fashion at IMDb
2014	Too Tall	Tall blond	Too Tall at IMDb
2016	The Game Warden	Redneck Girl	The Game Warden at IMDb
2017	La Fosse aux Tigres	Herself	La Fosse aux Tigres at IMDb
2019	The Amazing Race Canada	Herself	Season 7 at IMDb
2019	Underground	Wife of Dave Leduc	Myanmar movie in Burmese
