= Gore, Nova Scotia =

Community in Nova Scotia, Canada

Gore
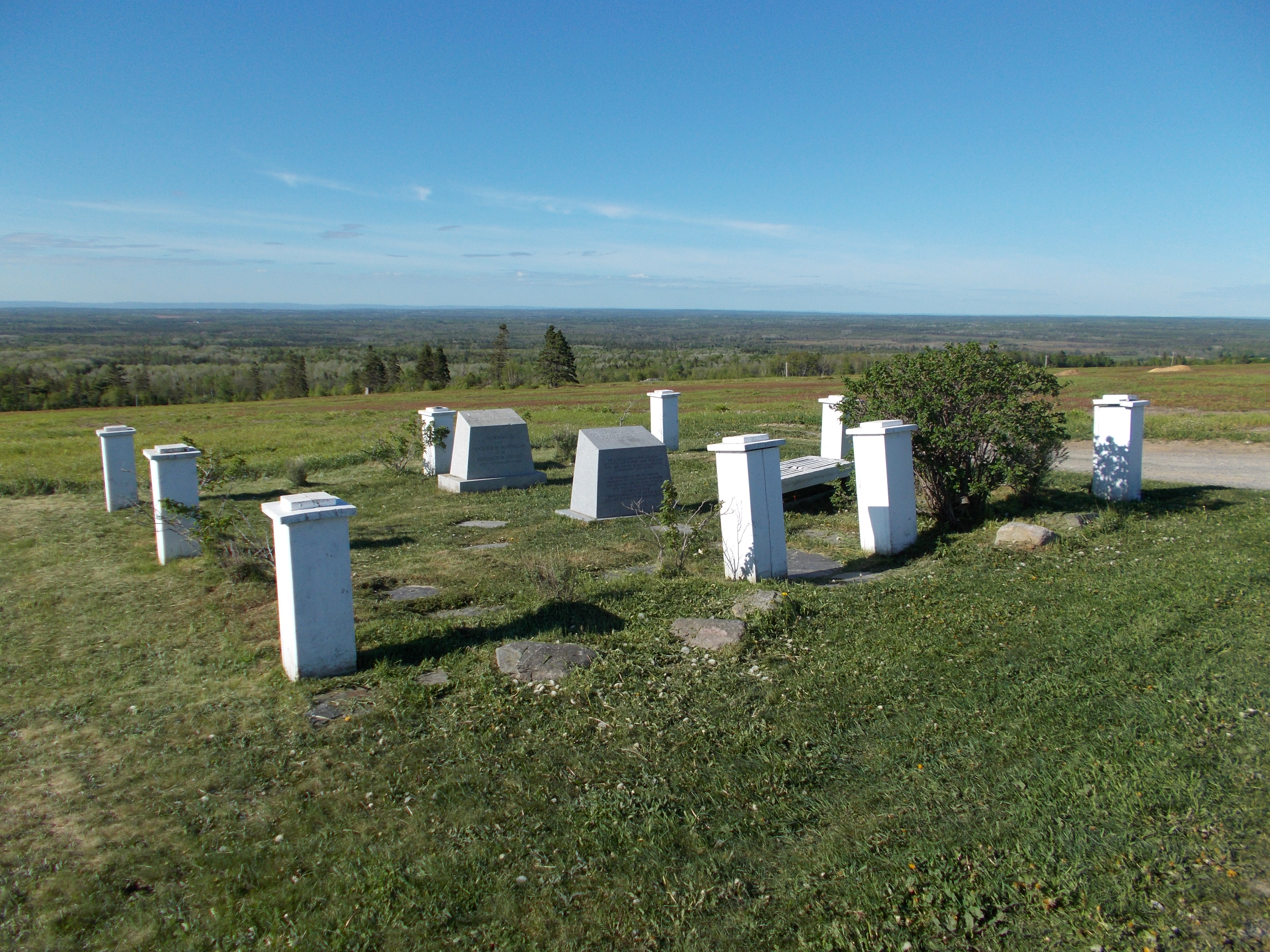
- Courthouse Hill in Gore

- Location within Nova Scotia
- Coordinates: 45°7′4″N 63°44′12″W
- Country: Canada
- Province: Nova Scotia
- County: Hants County
- Municipality: East Hants Municipality
- Time zone: UTC-4 (AST)
  - Summer (DST): UTC-3 (ADT)
- Canadian Postal Code: B0N 1T0
- Area code: 902
- Telephone Exchange: 883
- NTS Map: 011E04
- GNBC Code: CANZC

Gore is a community in the Canadian province of Nova Scotia, located in East Hants Municipality in Hants County. The community was named after Charles Stephen Gore. (Gore was the Aide-de-camp of Major General James Kempt, after whom Kempt, Nova Scotia is named.) The community was settled primarily by the 84th Regiment of Foot (Royal Highland Emigrants).

Gore is a farming community near the Rawdon Hills, and is home to Environment Canada's Doppler weather radar station "XGO". It was once home to the East Hants Courthouse which conducted business of the East Hants Municipality and its council. The courthouse stood on the community's Courthouse Hill for 90 years until a fire destroyed it on July 22, 1956. The courthouse was never rebuilt but today there is a memorial that marks the place where it once stood. The site, located on Courthouse Hill Road, is renowned as a scenic viewing point. On a clear day parts of five Nova Scotia counties, from west to east Kings, Cumberland, Colchester, Pictou, as well as Hants, can be seen from marked stones placed in the ground. Gorgeous wildblueberry fields and farmland surround the monument.

In the Gore, there is access to a large amount of mountain bike trails for any level of rider through the woods and across farmland known as Empire Trails. At the same location, there is agriculture tourism and outdoor adventure event grounds known as NovaStrong. Also, the East Gore Eco Airpark for small hobby planes

== See also ==
- East Gore, Nova Scotia
- West Gore, Nova Scotia
