= British Sports Book Awards =

Literary award

The Telegraph Sports Book Awards
- Awarded for: British sports books
- Sponsored by: The Telegraph
- Country: England
- Hosted by: National Sporting Club
- First award: 2019
- Final award: Active
- Website: https://sportsbookawards.com/

The Sports Book Awards (previously National Sporting Club Book Awards then Telegraph Sports Book Awards) is a British literary award for sports writing. It was first awarded in 2003 as part of the National Sporting Club. Awards are presented in multiple categories. Each category is judged by one of: sports writers and broadcasters, retailers and enthusiasts. The winners from each category are then opened to public vote through a website to choose an overall winner. The other major sports writing award in Britain is the William Hill Sports Book of the Year.

The awards were founded by David H. Willis.

== Sponsors ==
The awards' original sponsors included Ladbrokes, Virgin Publishing, Butler and Tanner and WH Smith. As of 2015, new sponsors included Cross Pens, Sky Sports, The Times, Littlehampton Book Services, Robert Walters, TalkSPORT, Freshtime, Human Race Group, Arbuthnot Latham and Procorre.

== Previous winners ==
=== Best overall winner ===
- 2011 Promised Land – Anthony Clavane (Yellow Jersey Press)
- 2012 Engage: The Fall and Rise of Matt Hampson – Paul Kimmage (Simon & Schuster)
- 2013 Bobby's Open: Mr Jones and the Golf Shot that Defined a Legend – Steven Reid (Corinthian)
- 2014 The Nowhere Men: The Unknown Story of Football’s True Talent Spotters – Michael Calvin (Century)
- 2015 Proud - Gareth Thomas and Michael Calvin (Ebury)
- 2016 My Fight, Your Fight – Ronda Rousey (Arrow)
- 2025 My Beautiful Sisters - Khalida Popal

=== Best Autobiography/Biography ===
- 2012 Engage: The Fall and Rise of Matt Hampson – Paul Kimmage (Simon & Schuster)
- 2013 Seven Deadly Sins – David Walsh (Simon & Schuster)
- 2014 The Outsider - Jimmy Connors

==== Best Autobiography ====
- 2003 Niall Quinn: The Autobiography – Niall Quinn and Tom Humphries (Headline)
- 2004 Woody and Nord – Gareth Southgate and Andy Woodman (Penguin)
- 2005 Playing with Fire – Nasser Hussain (Michael Joseph)
- 2006 Frank: Fighting Back – Frank Bruno with Kevin Mitchell (Yellow Jersey Press)
- 2007 Back from the Brink – Paul McGrath (Century)
- 2008 My Manchester United Years – Bobby Charlton (Headline)
- 2009 Black and Blue – Paul Canoville (Headline)
- 2010 Open: An Autobiography – Andre Agassi (HarperCollins)
- 2011 Beware of the Dog – Brian Moore (Simon & Schuster)
- 2015 Proud - Gareth Thomas and Michael Calvin (Ebury)
- 2016 Formula One and Beyond: The Autobiography – Max Mosley (Simon & Schuster)
- 2017 No Nonsense: The Autobiography - Joey Barton (Simon & Schuster)
- 2018 Unbroken - Martine Wright with Sue Mott (Simon & Schuster)

==== Best Biography ====
- 2003 Jack & Bobby: Story of Brothers in Conflict – Leo McKinstry (Collins Willow)
- 2004 Keeper of Dreams – Ronald Reng (Yellow Jersey Press)
- 2005 Basil D'Oliveira – Peter Oborne (Little Brown)
- 2006 Lance Armstrong: Tour de Force – Daniel Coyle (Collins Willow)
- 2007 The Death of Marco Pantani – Matt Rendell (Weidenfeld & Nicolson)
- 2008 In Search of Robert Millar – Richard Moore (HarperSport)
- 2009 Regga – Clay Regazzoni – Christopher Hilton (Haynes Publishing)
- 2010 Harold Larwood – Duncan Hamilton (Quercus)
- 2011 Trautmann's Journey – Catrine Clay (Yellow Jersey Press)
- 2015 Bobby Moore: The Man in Full - Matt Dickinson (Yellow Jersey Press)
- 2016 Speed Kings – Andy Bull (Bantam)
- 2017 The Maverick Mountaineer - Robert Wainwright (ABC)
- 2018 Ali: A Life - Jonathan Eig (Simon & Schuster)

==== Best International Autobiography ====
- 2016 My Fight, Your Fight – Ronda Rousey (Arrow)
- 2017 Find a Way - Diana Nyad (Knopf)
- 2018 Form - Kieren Fallon (Simon & Schuster)

=== Best Football Book ===
- 2007 Sir Alf – Leo McKinstry (HarperSport)
- 2008 Provided You Don't Kiss Me – Duncan Hamilton (Fourth Estate)
- 2009 Inverting the Pyramid – Jonathan Wilson (Orion)
- 2010 Cantona – Philippe Auclair (Macmillan)
- 2011 Promised Land – Anthony Clavane (Yellow Jersey Press)
- 2012 A Life Too Short – Ronald Reng
- 2013 Barca: The Making of the Greatest Team in the World – Graham Hunter (BackPage Press)
- 2014 The Nowhere Men - Michael Calvin
- 2015 Thirty-One Nil - James Montague (Bloomsbury)
- 2016 Cristiano Ronaldo – Guillem Balagué (Orion)
- 2017 Forever Young - Oliver Kay (Quercus)
- 2018 The Billionaires Club - James Montague (Bloomsbury)

=== Best Cricket Book ===
- 2007 Sixty Summers: Cricket Since the War – David Foot and Ivan Ponting (Fairfield Books)
- 2008 More Than a Game: The Story of Cricket’s Early Years – John Major (HarperPress)
- 2009 The Way It Was – Stephen Chalke (Fairfield Books)
- 2010 Golden Boy – Christian Ryan (Orion)
- 2011 Slipless in Settle – Harry Pearson (Little Brown)
- 2012 Fred Trueman – Chris Waters
- 2013 On Warne – Gideon Haigh (Simon & Schuster)
- 2014 The Great Tamasha - James Astill
- 2015 Wounded Tiger: The History of Cricket in Pakistan - Peter Oborne (Simon & Schuster)
- 2016 Chasing Shadows: The Life & Death Of Peter Roebuck – Tim Lane and Elliot Cartledge (Hardie Grant)
- 2017 A Beautiful Game: My Love Affair with Cricket - Mark Nicholas (Allen & Unwin)
- 2018 Over and Out, Albert Trott - Steve Neal (Pitch Publishing)

=== Best Rugby Book ===
- 2008 Ripley's World – Andy Ripley (Mainstream Publishing)
- 2009 Seeing Red: Twelve Tumultuous Years in Welsh Rugby – Alun Carter and Nick Bishop (Mainstream Publishing)
- 2010 Confessions of a Rugby Mercenary – John Daniell (Ebury Press)
- 2011 The Grudge – Tom English (Yellow Jersey Press)
- 2012 Higgy – Alastair Hignell
- 2013 The Final Whistle: The Great War in Fifteen Players – Stephen Cooper (The History Press)
- 2014 City Centre - Simon Halliday
- 2015 Beyond The Horizon - Richard Parks (Sphere)
- 2016 No Borders: Playing Rugby for Ireland – Tom English (Arena Sport)
- 2017 The Battle - Paul O'Connell (Penguin Ireland)
- 2018 Wrecking Ball - Billy Vunipola with Gershon Portnoi (Headline)
- 2019 Sevens Heaven – Ben Ryan (Weidenfeld & Nicolson)
- 2020 My Life and Rugby: The Autobiography – Eddie Jones (Macmillan)
- 2021 Exe Men: The Extraordinary Rise of Exeter Chiefs – Robert Kitson (Polaris)
- 2022 The Flying Prince: Alexander Obolensky – Hugh Godwin (Hodder & Stoughton)

=== Best Horse Racing Book ===
- 2011 The Story of Your Life – James Lambie (Matador)
- 2012 Beyond the Frame – Edward Whitaker
- 2013 Her Majesty's Pleasure – Julian Muscat (Racing Post Books)
- 2014 Henry Cecil: Trainer of Genius - Brough Scott
- 2015 Cheltenham Et Al - Alastair Down (Racing Post)

=== Best Cycling Book ===
- 2015 The Race Against The Stasi - Herbie Sykes (Aurum Press)
- 2016 The Racer – David Millar (Yellow Jersey Press)
- 2017 Triumphs and Turbulence: My Autobiography - Chris Boardman (Ebury Press)
- 2018 Tom Simpson: Bird on the Wire - Andy McGrath (Rapha)
- 2022 'Desire Discrimination Determination Black Champions in Cycling' - Marlon Lee Moncrieffe (Rapha)

=== Best Golf Book ===
- 2012 The 100 Greatest Ever Golfers – Andy Farrell
- 2013 Bobby's Open: Mr Jones and the Golf Shot that Defined a Legend – Steven Reid (Icon Books)

=== Best Motorsports Book ===
- 2012 Ultimate E-Type – Philip Porter
- 2013 That Near-Death Thing – Rick Broadbent (Orion)

=== Best Illustrated Book ===
- 2003 Peter Alliss’ Golf Heroes – Peter Alliss (Virgin Books)
- 2004 Football Days: Classic Photos – Peter Robinson (Mitchell Beazley)
- 2005 The Olympics Athens to Athens: 1896–2004 – M Jacque Rogge (Weidenfeld & Nicolson)
- 2006 Speed Addicts: Grand Prix Racing – Mark Hughes (Collins Willow)
- 2007 1966 Uncovered: The Unseen Story of the World Cup in England – Peter Robinson and Doug Cheeseman (Mitchell Beazley)
- 2008 Goodbye Gay Meadow – Mathew Ashton (GGM Publishing)
- 2009 In The Frame: Great Racing Photographs – Edward Whitaker (Highdown)
- 2010 Centre Court: The Jewel in Wimbledon's Crown – John Barrett and Ian Hewitt (Vision Sports Publishing)
- 2011 61 The Spurs Double (Vision Sports Publishing)
- 2012 Wimbledon – Ian Hewitt and Bob Martin
- 2013 21 Days to Glory – Team Sky and Dave Brailsford (HarperCollins)
- 2014 Incredible Waves: An Appreciation of Perfect Surf - Chris Power
- 2015 The Age Of Innocence - ed. Reuel Golden (Taschen)
- 2016 1/1000: The Sports Photography of Bob Martin – Bob Martin (Vision Sports Publishing)
- 2017 The Lane - Adam Powley, Steve Perryman and Martin Cloake (Vision Sports Publishing)
- 2018 The History Makers - Sarah Juggins and Richard Stainthorpe (Pitch Publishing)

=== Best New Writer ===
- 2003 Kings of the Mountains: How Colombia's Cycling Heroes Changed Their Nation's History – Matt Rendell (Aurum Press)
- 2004 John Daly: Letting the Big Dog Eat – Gavin Newsham (Virgin Books)
- 2005 Feet in the Clouds – Richard Askwith (Aurum Press)
- 2006 My Father and Other Working Class Football Heroes – Gary Imlach (Yellow Jersey Press)
- 2007 The Hour: Sporting Immortality the Hard Way – Michael Hutchinson (Yellow Jersey Press)
- 2008 The Pyjama Game: A Journey into Judo – Mark Law (Aurum Press)
- 2009 When Friday Comes – James Montague (Mainstream Publishing)
- 2010 Eclipse – Nicholas Clee (Bantam Press)
- 2011 Bounce – Matthew Syed (Fourth Estate)
- 2012 The Ghost Runner – Bill Jones
- 2013 Running with the Kenyans: Discovering the secrets of the fastest people on earth – Adharanand Finn (Faber and Faber)
- 2014 Land of Second Chances - Tim Lewis
- 2015 Night Games - Anna Krien (Yellow Jersey Press)
- 2016 Two Hours: The Quest To Run The Impossible Marathon – Ed Caesar (Viking)
- 2017 And The Sun Shines Now - Adrian Tempany (Faber & Faber)

=== Outstanding Sports Writing Award ===
- 2014 Everest - Harriet Tuckey
- 2015 Alone - Bill Jones (Bloomsbury)
- 2016 Barbarian Days: A Surfing Tale – William Finnegan (Corsair)
- 2018 Centaur - Declan Murphy and Ami Rao (Black Swan, Transworld Publishers)

=== Best Publicity Campaign ===
- 2010 The Man Who Cycled the World – Campaign by Madeline Toy (Random House)
- 2011 It's All About the Bike – Campaign by Mari Yamazaki (Particular Books)
- 2012 Run! – Campaign by Clare Drysdale (Allen & Unwin)
- 2013 Be Careful What You Wish For – Campaign by Bethan Jones (Yellow Jersey Press)
- 2014 Alex Ferguson: My Autobiography - Campaign by Karen Geary and Rebecca Mundy (Hodder)
- 2015 The Second Half by Roy Keane with Roddy Doyle - Campaign by Elizabeth Allen (Weidenfeld & Nicolson), with Jane Beaton from Kew Publicity
- 2016 The World of Cycling According to G – Campaign by Fiona Murphy (Quercus)

=== Sports Book Retailer of the Year ===
- 2012 Waterstones
- 2013 Foyles
- 2014 Waterstones
- 2015 Waterstones

=== Outstanding Contribution to Sports Writing ===
- 2012 Nick Hornby
- 2013 Christopher Martin-Jenkins
- 2015 Michael Parkinson
- 2016 Brian Glanville
- 2017 Hugh McIlvanney
- 2018 John Woodcock
