= Dancing on the Edge =

Dancing on the Edge may refer to:

- Dancing on the Edge (TV series), a 2013 BBC drama by Stephen Poliakoff
- Dancing on the Edge (album), a 1986 album by Roy Buchanan
- Dancing on the Edge, a 2005 American documentary with Alan Tafoya
- Dancing on the Edge, a 1997 novel by Han Nolan
- Conrad and Lady Black: Dancing on the Edge, a 2006 biography of Conrad Black and Barbara Amiel by Tom Bower
