= Broken Dreams =

Broken Dreams may refer to:

- Broken Dreams: Vanity, Greed and the Souring of British Football, 2003 book by Tom Bower
- Broken Dreams (1933 film), starring Randolph Scott
- Broken Dreams, 2011 film by Fathia Absie
- Broken Dreams (2019 film), a 2019 Polish documentary film directed by Tomasz Magierski
- Broken Dreams: Stories from the Myanmar Coup, a 2023 Burmese anthology film by the Ninefold Mosaic
- "Broken Dreams" (Merseybeat), a 2003 television episode
