= Adharanand Finn =

British journalist and author

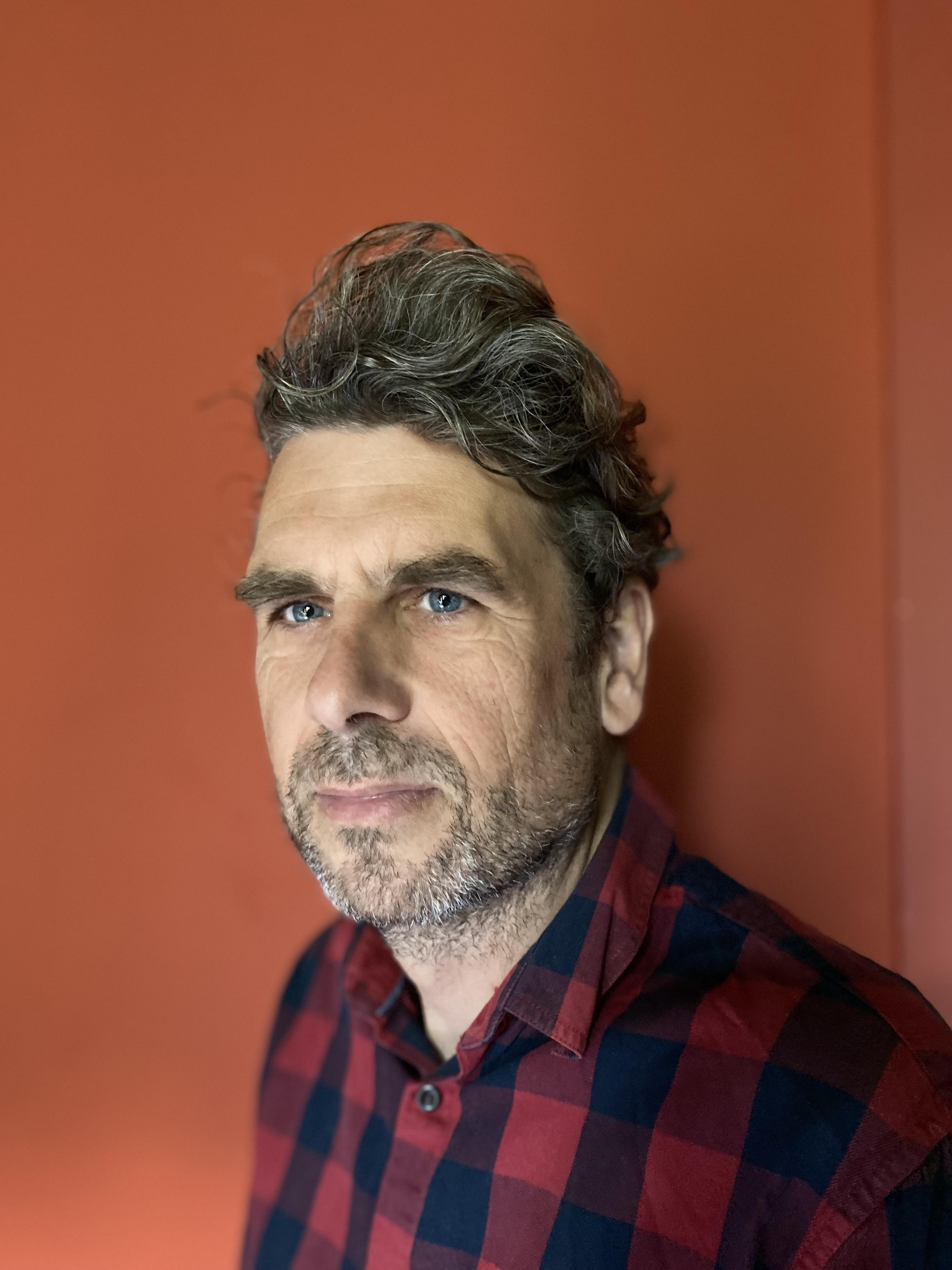
- Finn in 2022
- Born: 1974 (age 51–52); London, U.K.
- Writing career
- Notable work: Running with the Kenyans
- Website: www.adharanandfinn.com

Adharanand Finn is a British author, journalist, and podcaster.

== Career ==
Finn's first book, Running with the Kenyans: Discovering the secrets of the fastest people on earth, was published in 2012. He moved with his family to Iten, Kenya to investigate what made Kenyan athletes so fast. Running with the Kenyans was named the Sunday Times Sports Book of the Year, and was shortlisted for the William Hill Sports Book of the Year, whilst Finn won Best New Writer at the Sports Book Awards.

In his second book, The Way of the Runner: A journey into the obsessive world of Japanese running, Finn moved to Japan to discover more about the running culture there and ekiden. His third book, The Rise of the Ultra Runners: A journey to the edge of human endurance, about ultra running, was again shortlisted for the William Hill Sports Book of the Year.

In 2024, Finn ran 1,400 miles (2,300 km) around Ireland over ten weeks, which will form the basis of his next book.

Finn regularly writes for The Guardian. He also hosts a podcast The Way of the Runner: Conversations on Running with Adharanand Finn, in which he has interviewed an eclectic mix of runners including marathon world record holder Eliud Kipchoge, punk rocker Boff Whalley and snooker world champion Ronnie O'Sullivan. Running with the Kenyans was O'Sullivan's book choice when he appeared on Desert Island Discs.

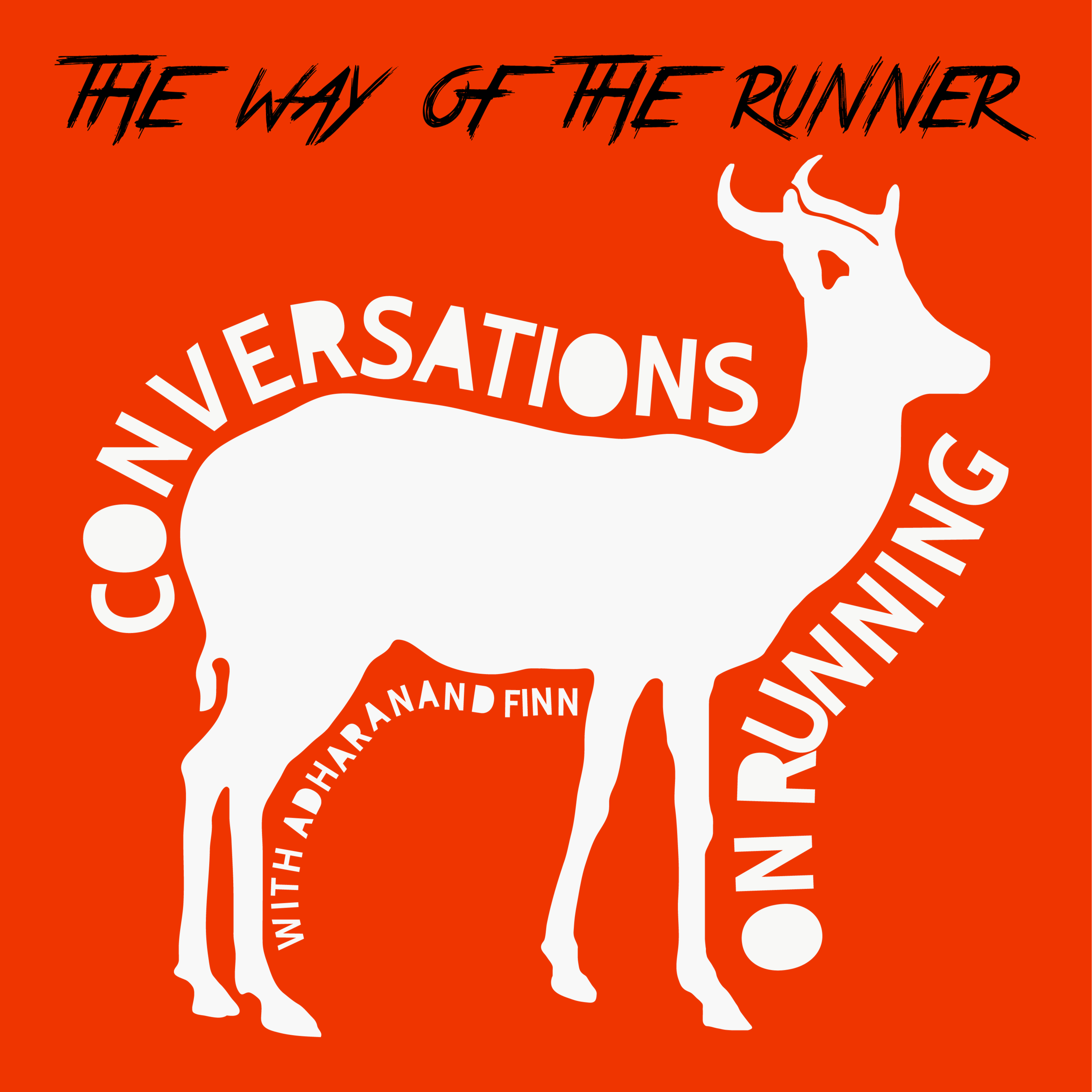
Podcast logo

== Personal life ==
Finn was born in 1974 in London. His parents, both Irish, gave him a Sanskrit first name. Finn grew up in Northampton, where he discovered running, and now lives in Totnes with his wife and three children.

== Bibliography ==
- Running with the Kenyans: Discovering the secrets of the fastest people on earth. Faber & Faber. 2012.
- The Way of the Runner: A journey into the obsessive world of Japanese running. Faber & Faber. 2014.
- The Rise of the Ultra Runners: A journey to the edge of human endurance. Faber & Faber. 2019.
