= James Montague =

James Montague or Montagu may refer to:

- James Montagu (MP) (died 1666), MP for Huntingdon
- James Montague (bishop) (1568–1618), English bishop
- James Montagu (died 1748), MP and coal owner.
- James J. Montague (1873–1941), American writer and poet
- James Montagu (Royal Navy officer) (1752–1794), captain in the Royal Navy
- James Montagu (judge) (1666–1723), English barrister, and judge
- James Piotr Montague (born 1979), British writer and journalist
