= Feet in the Clouds =

Feet in the Clouds: a tale of fell-running and obsession
- Cover of Aurum Press edition (2013)
- Author: Richard Askwith
- Publication date: 2004
- ISBN: 1854109898

Feet in the Clouds: a tale of fell-running and obsession is a cult 2004 fell running book by British journalist and author Richard Askwith. The book was shortlisted for the William Hill Sports Book of the Year and the Boardman Tasker Prize for Mountain Literature. It also won Askwith the Best New Writer prize at the British Sports Book Awards.

It was first published by Aurum Press in 2004, and reprinted in 2005. A new edition was released by Aurum in 2013, with an introduction by Robert Macfarlane.
