= John Daniell (New Zealand rugby player) =

John Daniell (born 1972) is an English-New Zealand rugby player and journalist. He was born in New Zealand, and educated both there and in England. After studying English at the University of Oxford, he worked as a journalist for Radio New Zealand and Capital Television.

== Rugby career ==
His early rugby career included playing for England Schoolboys (1990), New Zealand Under 19s (1991), New Zealand Colts (1992), Marist St Pats (1992–97), Oxford University (Blue, 1992–1994) and Wellington Lions (1994–96). In 1996 he turned professional, playing for French clubs Racing (Racing Club de France) (1997–2000), Perpignan (USA Perpignan) (2000–2003), and Montpellier (Montpellier Hérault RC) (2003–2006).

== Journalism ==
Currently a freelance journalist, he has been published in The Observer, The Sunday Telegraph, Financial Times, The Times, The Evening Post, The New Zealand Listener, L'Equipe and Le Monde.

Daniell and his wife, Noelle McCarthy, had a daughter in 2017 and were married the following year. Since 2017 they have made podcasts together as Birds of Paradise Productions. Their podcast "Getting Better", produced by McCarthy and Emma Espiner, won an award at the 2021 Voyager Media Awards.

== Publications ==
- Inside French Rugby: Confessions of a Kiwi Mercenary (2007), Awa Press ISBN 978-0-9582750-1-9
- Confessions of a Rugby Mercenary (2009), Ebury Press ISBN 978-0-09-193068-4

2009 William Hill Sports Book of the Year shortlist
2010 British Sports Book Awards (Best Rugby Book)
