= Richard Askwith =

British journalist and author

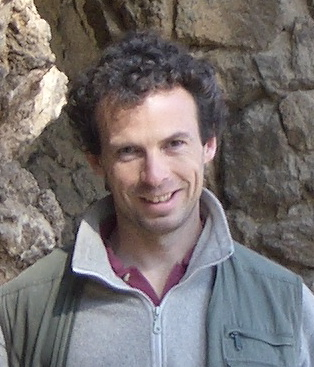
- Askwith in 2010
- Born: 1960 (age 65–66)
- Writing career
- Notable work: Feet in the Clouds
- Website: richardaskwith.co.uk

Richard Askwith is a British journalist and author. He is best-known for the cult 2004 fell running book Feet in the Clouds, which won him the Best New Writer prize at the Sports Book Awards. The book was also shortlisted for the William Hill Sports Book of the Year and the Boardman Tasker Prize for Mountain Literature.

Askwith's book Unbreakable about Lata Brandisová was voted Biography of the Year at the Sports Book Awards in 2020.

== Bibliography ==
- Feet in the Clouds. Aurum Press. 2004.
- The Lost Village: In Search of a Forgotten Rural England. Ebury Press. 2008.
- Let IT Go: My Extraordinary Story, from Refugee to Entrepreneur to Philanthropist. Andrews UK. 2012. (co-written with Stephanie Shirley)
- Running Free: A Runner's Journey Back to Nature. Yellow Jersey Press. 2014.
- Today We Die a Little: Emil Zátopek, Olympic Legend to Cold War Hero. Random House. 21 April 2016. ISBN 9781473524088 – via Google Books. Author's note
- People Power: Remaking Parliament for the Populist Age. Biteback Publishing. 2018.
- Unbreakable: the countess, the Nazis and the world's most dangerous horse race. Yellow Jersey Press. 2019.
- Toymaker: the autobiography of the man whose designs shaped our childhoods. 2021. (co-written with Tom Karen)
