= Robert Enke =

German footballer (1977–2009)

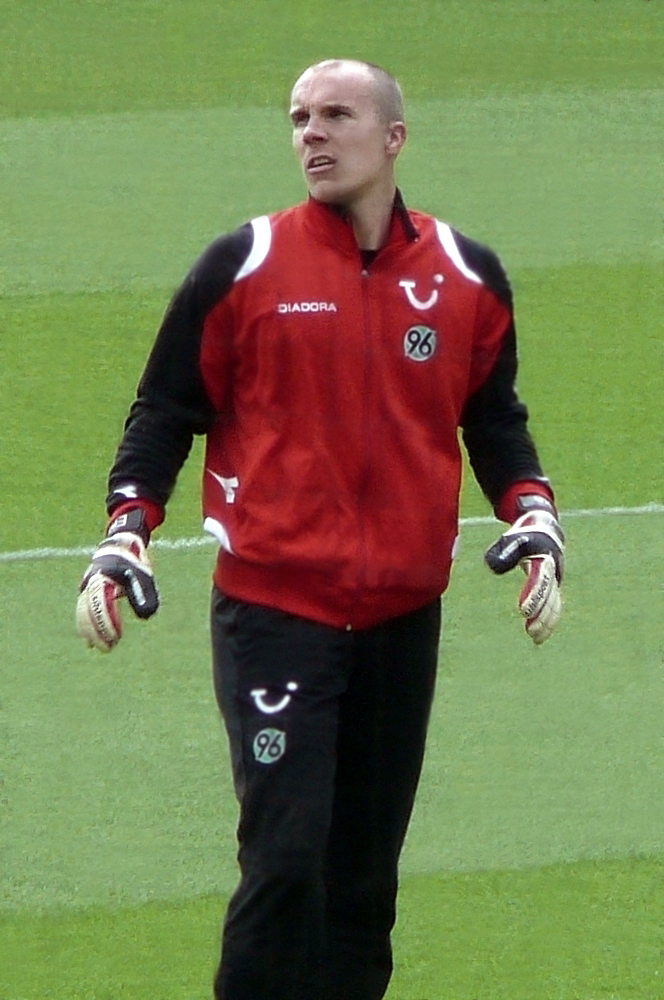
- Enke training with Hannover 96 in 2008

Personal information
- Full name: Robert Enke
- Date of birth: 24 August 1977
- Place of birth: Jena, East Germany
- Date of death: 10 November 2009 (aged 32)
- Place of death: Neustadt am Rübenberge, Germany
- Height: 1.86 m (6 ft 1 in)
- Position: Goalkeeper

Youth career
- 1985: BSG Jenapharm
- 1986–1995: Carl Zeiss Jena

Senior career*
Years	Team	Apps	(Gls)
1995–1996	Carl Zeiss Jena	3	(0)
1996–1999	Borussia Mönchengladbach	32	(0)
1999–2002	Benfica	77	(0)
2002–2004	Barcelona	3	(0)
2003	→ Fenerbahçe (loan)	1	(0)
2004	→ Tenerife (loan)	9	(0)
2004–2009	Hannover 96	164	(0)
Total		287	(0)

International career
1997–1999	Germany U-21	15	(0)
1998	Germany Olympic	4	(0)
2000–2004	Germany B	2	(0)
2007–2009	Germany	8	(0)
- * Club domestic league appearances and goals

Robert Enke (24 August 1977 – 10 November 2009) was a German professional footballer who played as a goalkeeper.

He played for Mönchengladbach, Benfica, and Barcelona, but made most of his appearances for Bundesliga side Hannover 96.

He won eight full international caps for the Germany national team between the 1999 Confederations Cup and his death in 2009, and was part of the squad which finished as runners-up in Euro 2008.

Enke died by suicide on the evening of 10 November 2009. At the time of his death, he was widely regarded as the leading contender for the German starting goalkeeper at the 2010 World Cup.

== Early life ==
Enke was born on 24 August 1977 in Jena, where he grew up in a flat in the district of Lobeda. He was the youngest of three children born to Dirk Enke, a sports psychologist, and Gisela Enke.

== Club career ==
=== Youth career ===
Enke began playing football from an early age, initially playing as a striker, before making the switch to goalkeeper, where he displayed obvious talent. He joined Carl Zeiss Jena in 1985 after an impressive performance while playing against them in a youth team match for SV Jenapharm.

He rose through the youth ranks at the club, and in 1993, he played for the Germany under-15 national team against England at Wembley Stadium. The game finished 0–0, with Enke receiving praise for multiple saves made throughout the match. At the age of 17, Enke signed his first professional contract with Carl Zeiss Jena.

=== Early career ===
Enke worked his way up to the first team at Carl Zeiss Jena during the 1995–96 season. He made his professional debut on 11 November 1995, against future club Hannover 96 in the 2. Bundesliga. He was given the opportunity after the club suffered two consecutive fiascos against Duisburg and Bochum, prompting coach Eberhard Vogel to drop the former first-choice goalkeeper Mario Neumann for the youngster Enke. Enke played three games during November 1995, but Neumann was restored to the team after this period and Enke did not appear for the first team again that season.

The goalkeeper actually would never play for the club again as he was signed by Bundesliga club Borussia Mönchengladbach in the summer of 1996. Enke spent his first two seasons here with the club's U-23 side, playing in the lower leagues, as well as for the Under-21 national team and honing his talent, studying the club's number one goalkeeper Uwe Kamps.

His chance came on the eve of the 1998–99 season when Uwe Kamps suffered a ruptured Achilles tendon and new coach Friedel Rausch gave Enke his big chance to finally make his club debut. His first Bundesliga game came on 15 August 1998 in a 3–0 win over Schalke 04 that put them top of the table. However, this position quickly changed as, despite Enke's best efforts, fifteen goals were scored past him in just one week. The club plummeted to the foot of the league where they remained from October until their eventual relegation (Rainer Bonhof was manager from November onward).

=== Life abroad ===
In June 1999, he joined Benfica in Portugal, signing a three-year contract, and becoming one of four goalkeepers on the team's books. Enke had a history of panic attacks and had second thoughts soon after signing for the team. He realised however that, having signed a contract, he was obliged to fulfil it. The club were then managed by Enke's countryman Jupp Heynckes, who promptly made him captain. His time in Portugal was a turbulent one, as the club changed manager three times in his three seasons there and suffered their lowest ever league finish (sixth) in a trophyless spell, beset by financial difficulties that caused players wages to often be late. In spite of these issues, Enke quickly gained the admiration of Benfica's fans, and he is still fondly remembered by many of them.

Despite these problems, Enke's performances gained him the admiration of Encarnados (reds) fans, as well as interest from clubs like Arsenal, Atlético Madrid and Manchester United chasing him. After contract talks with Benfica stalled, Enke took up the offer of Spanish giants Barcelona and moved on a free transfer in June 2002 on a three-year deal.

Life at the Camp Nou proved tough for Enke — he later labelled the goalkeeper's spot at Barça as the "most difficult goalkeeping position in Europe" – as he ended up playing second choice to Roberto Bonano and then Víctor Valdés. His debut set the mark, as the club was humiliatingly knocked out of the Spanish Cup by third flight Novelda at the first hurdle on 11 September 2002 and was criticised by teammate Frank de Boer in public for his part in their exit. His brief taste of La Liga came in a 20-minute appearance as a substitute in a 2–2 draw at Osasuna on 2 March 2003. He did manage to sample some European action during his spell though as he made two UEFA Champions League appearances, against Club Brugge and Galatasaray in the group stage.

The following season, as Frank Rijkaard replaced Louis van Gaal as coach, Enke was loaned out to Turkish side Fenerbahçe – then managed by German coach Christoph Daum – as part of the deal that saw Rüştü Reçber move to the Spanish club. However, his career continued to stall as he managed to play just a solitary game there, a traumatic 0–3 defeat to Istanbulspor on 10 August 2003. His own fans pelted him with cigarette lighters and bottles during the game, blaming him for this bitter defeat. These scenes caused Enke to immediately quit the club and his planned one-year loan and return to Spain. It was at this time that Enke suffered his first spell of depression, which led to his almost quitting football altogether.

After a four-month spell back at Barcelona, but outside the first team squad, Enke dropped down to the Spanish Segunda División when he was loaned to Tenerife in January 2004 for the remainder of the season. Here, he enjoyed an upturn, performing strongly and winning acclaim from the fans and other clubs. Although he believed his career was destined to remain in the lower leagues, he left Tenerife to join Hannover 96 in the Bundesliga.

=== Bundesliga return ===
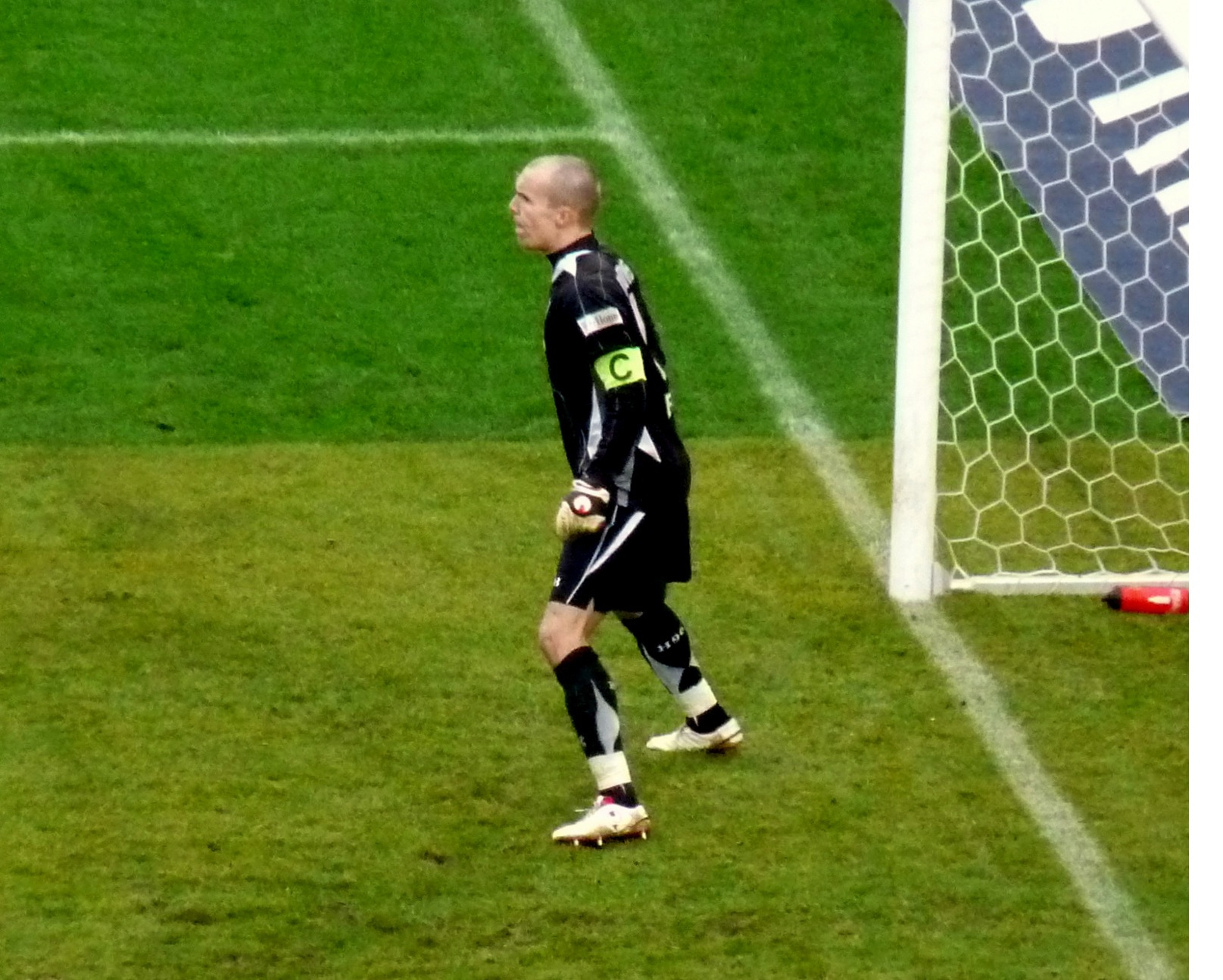
Enke captaining Hannover in 2009

Following his return to form at Tenerife, Enke returned to his homeland joining Bundesliga side Hannover 96 in July 2004 on a free transfer in an initial two-year deal. His career enjoyed its greatest success and stability, as he became firmly established as the club's first choice and was voted the best goalkeeper in the league by his fellow professionals in kicker magazine.

Such form caused Enke to be linked with moves to larger clubs, particularly VfB Stuttgart. In December 2006, however, he ended this speculation by signing a contract extension with Hannover 96 until the end of the 2009–10 season. He was elected team captain by his teammates for the 2007–08 season, a role he would retain for the rest of his career. He again won the best goalkeeper award for the 2008–09 season, which would tragically prove to be his final full campaign.

Enke played 180 times for Hannover 96 in total. He made the final appearance of his career on 8 November 2009 in a 2–2 draw at home to Hamburg, just two days before his death.

== International career ==
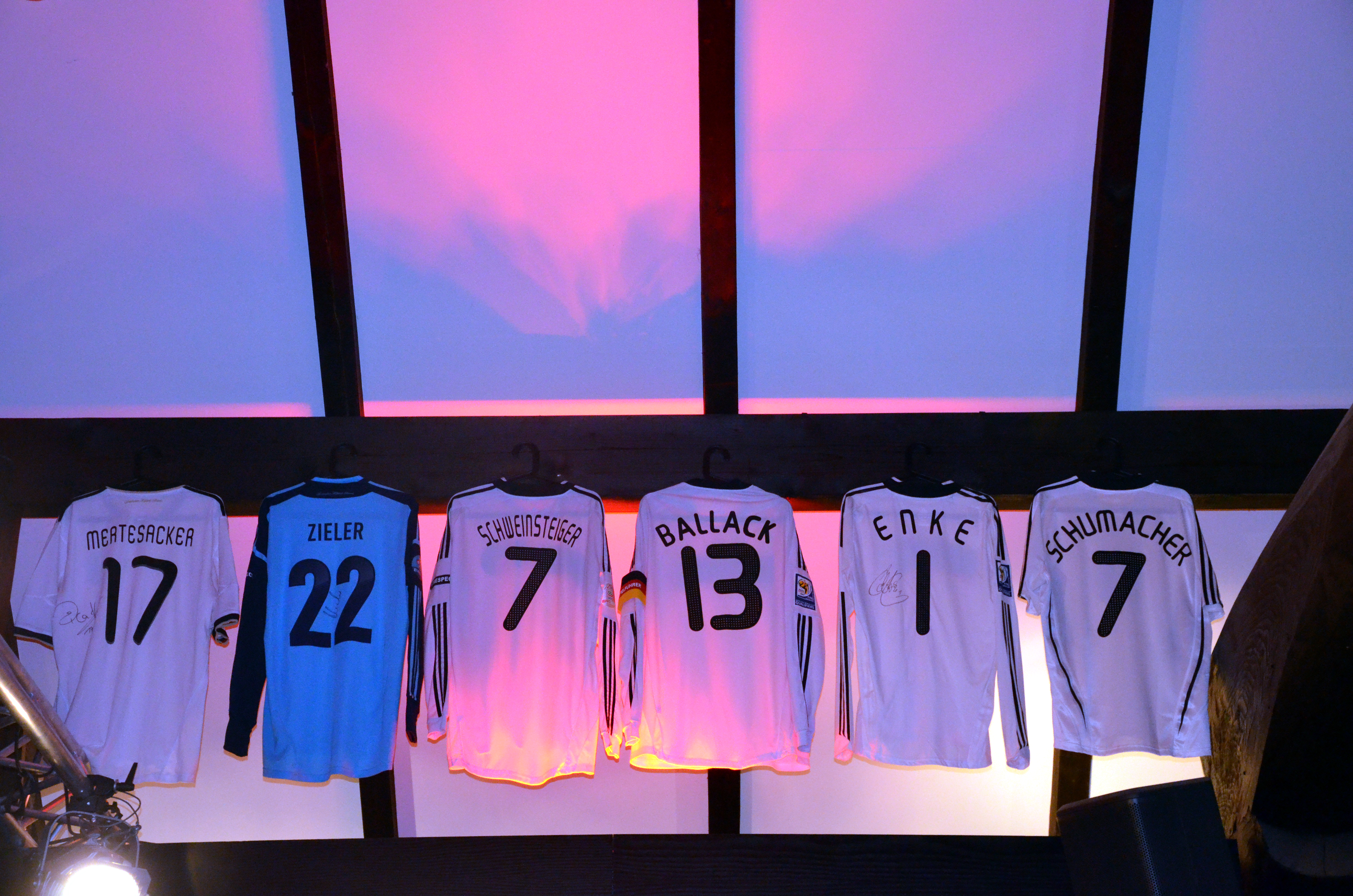
Enke's No.1 shirt alongside those of other German sportspeople, on display at the Niedersachsenstadion, 2013

Enke first represented his country in 1997 whilst playing for Borussia Mönchengladbach, winning a place in the German Under-21 side and retained the number one jersey for the remainder of the season, playing 15 times in total. His performances there convinced former national team coach Erich Ribbeck to include him in the squad for the 1999 Confederations Cup, although he did not feature in any games.

His international career then stalled when he left Germany and he was not considered again until his return to the Bundesliga. The growing acclaim he enjoyed after saw him in contention for the 2006 FIFA World Cup squad, under Jürgen Klinsmann, although he missed out ultimately. He succeeded in breaking into the squad shortly after, under new coach Joachim Löw, in being chosen for a friendly against Georgia, and, after first choice Jens Lehmann caught the flu, again against Cyprus.

He finally made his senior international debut for Germany in a 0–1 friendly defeat to Denmark in Duisburg on 28 March 2007. After further games, he was selected for their Euro 2008 squad which would compete in Austria and Switzerland. Enke was an unused substitute during the tournament that saw Germany finish as runners-up.

With the international retirement of previous number one Jens Lehmann at Euro 2008, Enke was poised to make the position his own and played in several World Cup 2010 qualifiers. However, in October 2008, he broke the scaphoid of his left hand while training with the national team for a qualifier against Russia. After undergoing surgery, he was sidelined for two months, and was replaced by René Adler. Upon his return in January 2009, he again became the number one keeper in the national team.

In September and October 2009, Enke was again out of action for several weeks. The reason given to the Hannover 96 coaching was an intestinal infection campylobacter, although it is revealed in Ronald Reng's book A Life Too Short: The Tragic Story of Robert Enke that this was only partly true and in fact Enke's depression had returned. He did not return to football until late October, as a result of which he was not called up for a friendly against Chile for which the national team was preparing when he died. This game was subsequently called off as a mark of respect to Enke. Prior to his death, Enke was expected to be Germany's number one goalkeeper at the 2010 World Cup, ahead of Manuel Neuer.

He died having won eight full international caps. His final international appearance came on 12 August 2009 when he kept a clean sheet against Azerbaijan.

== Personal life ==
Enke was married to former modern pentathlete Teresa Reim and had a daughter who was born with a heart birth defect (hypoplastic left heart syndrome). She was also rendered deaf by the drugs used to treat her heart problems. Her cochlear implant surgery was successful but she died in 2006 due to complications of her heart defects. In May 2009, they adopted a baby girl. Enke lived with his family on a small farm in Empede, near Neustadt am Rübenberge.

Enke and his wife were involved in several animal rights campaigns and they owned many pets.

== Death ==
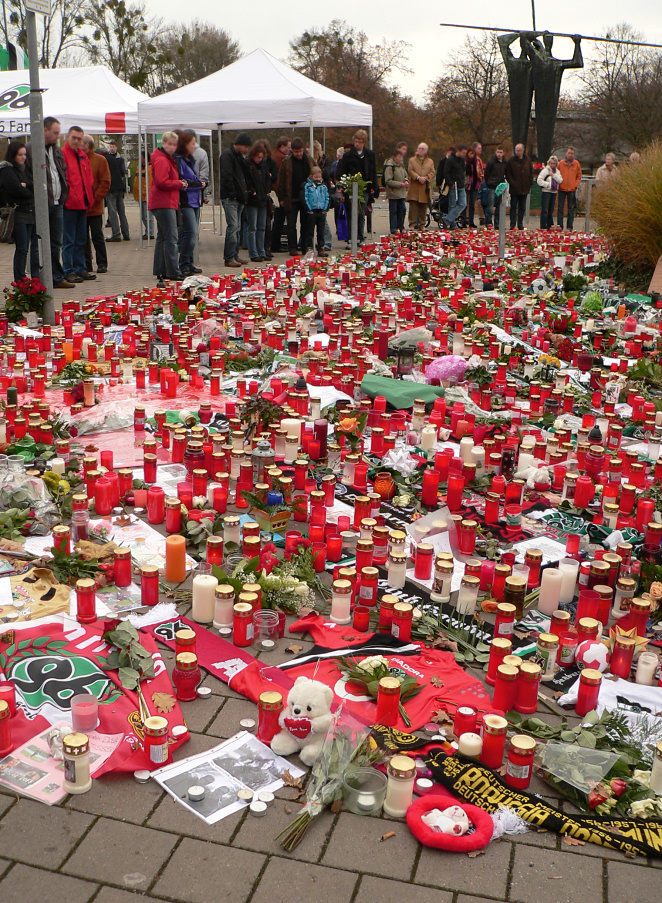
Tributes at HDI-Arena in Hanover

On the night of 10 November 2009, aged 32, Enke died by rail suicide, standing in front of a regional express train at a level crossing in Eilvese, Neustadt am Rübenberge. Police confirmed a suicide note was discovered but would not publicise its details. His widow, Teresa, revealed that her husband had been suffering from depression for six years and was treated by a psychiatrist. After the death of his daughter Lara in 2006, he struggled to cope with the loss.

In 2026, his wife Teresa, shared her heartfelt story on German podcast Wei Geht's, confirming that the suicide note found by police was discovered on the grave of their daughter. The brief message outlined Enke's desire to be with her again, referring to his planned suicide. It read 'Lara, Papa is coming!' and whilst Teresa's own mother claimed to have written it, Teresa remained defiant it was Enke's handwriting on the heart.

Following his death, many fans immediately flocked to Hannover 96's AWD-Arena home to lay flowers and light candles and sign the book of condolences upon news breaking. His former club Barcelona held a minute's silence before their game that night, and several international matches the following weekend paid the same tribute. As a mark of respect, the Germany national team cancelled their friendly match against Chile which had been scheduled for 14 November. A minute's silence was also held at all Bundesliga games during 21–22 November 2009 and at Benfica's game in the Cup of Portugal. Germany also cancelled a planned training session and all interviews after his death. Oliver Bierhoff, the national team's general manager, said: "We are all shocked. We are lost for words."

On 15 November 2009, nearly 40,000 attendees filled the AWD-Arena for his memorial service. Enke's coffin, covered in white roses, was carried by six of his Hannover 96 teammates. He was then buried in Neustadt, outside Hannover, next to his daughter's grave. As a further mark of respect for their former team mate, the players of Hannover 96 displayed the number one in a circle on the breast of their jerseys, as approved by the DFL as a subtle tribute, for the rest of the 2009–10 Bundesliga season.

In 2019, a ten-year memorial event was held at a theatre hall in Hannover.

Over the months after Enke's death, the number of railway suicides increased dramatically, not only in Germany but, later research showed, several nearby countries. This effect is more generally known as the Werther effect, and was referred to as the Enke effect (German: Enke-Effekt) by German media. It was noted that coverage of Enke's suicide had many elements that researchers believe may encourage others to move forward with planned suicides: detailed descriptions of how he did it, down to the exact location, images of grieving fans leaving memorials at the stadium, and speculation as to whether his continuing despondence over his daughter's death or a football setback motivated him.

=== Biography ===
Ronald Reng's biography A Life Too Short: The Tragedy of Robert Enke (2011) won the William Hill Sports Book of the Year in 2011.

=== Robert Enke Foundation ===
The German Football Association, Hannover 96 and the Deutsche Fußball Liga participated in a foundation in memory of Enke. The Robert Enke Foundation deals primarily with mental health of players.

== Career statistics ==
=== Club ===
Appearances and goals by club, season and competition
Club	Season	League			Cup		Continental		Total	
Club	Season	Division	Apps	Goals	Apps	Goals	Apps	Goals	Apps	Goals
Carl Zeiss Jena	1995–96	2. Bundesliga	3	0	0	0	—		3	0
Borussia Mönchengladbach	1996–97	Bundesliga	0	0	0	0	0	0	0	0
Borussia Mönchengladbach	1997–98	Bundesliga	0	0	0	0	—		0	0
Borussia Mönchengladbach	1998–99	Bundesliga	32	0	4	0	—		36	0
Borussia Mönchengladbach	Total		32	0	4	0	0	0	36	0
Benfica	1999–2000	Primeira Liga	26	0	1	0	6 (Note: Appearances in UEFA Cup)	0	33	0
Benfica	2000–01	Primeira Liga	26	0	4	0	2	0	32	0
Benfica	2001–02	Primeira Liga	25	0	3	0	—		28	0
Benfica	Total		77	0	8	0	8	0	93	0
Barcelona	2002–03	La Liga	1	0	1	0	2 (Note: Appearances in UEFA Champions League)	0	4	0
Fenerbahçe (loan)	2003–04	Süper Lig	1	0	0	0	—		1	0
Tenerife (loan)	2003–04	Segunda División	9	0	—		—		9	0
Hannover 96	2004–05	Bundesliga	34	0	4	0	—		38	0
Hannover 96	2005–06	Bundesliga	32	0	3	0	—		35	0
Hannover 96	2006–07	Bundesliga	34	0	4	0	—		38	0
Hannover 96	2007–08	Bundesliga	34	0	2	0	—		36	0
Hannover 96	2008–09	Bundesliga	24	0	2	0	—		26	0
Hannover 96	2009–10	Bundesliga	6	0	1	0	—		7	0
Hannover 96	Total		164	0	16	0	—		180	0
Career total			287	0	29	0	10	0	326	0

=== International ===
Appearances and goals by national team and year
National team	Year	Apps	Goals
Germany	2007	1	0
Germany	2008	3	0
Germany	2009	4	0
Total		8	0

== Honours ==
Fenerbahçe

- Süper Lig: 2003–04

Germany

- UEFA European Championship runner-up: 2008

Individual

- kicker's Bundesliga Goalkeeper of the Year: 2006, 2009
- VDV's Bundesliga Team of the Season: 2008–09
- NFV's Footballer of the Year: 2007
