= Tom Gregory (swimmer) =

British swimmer

Personal information
- Born: 9 October 1976 (age 49) Eltham, Greater London, Great Britain

Sport
- Sport: Swimming

Thomas Gregory (born 9 October 1976) swam the English Channel in 1988 at the age of 11 years 333 days, and holds the record as the youngest person to have done so. He made his swim on 6 September 1988. The record cannot be broken because the Channel Swimming Association has since set an age limit of 16 years for officially recognised crossings. The age limit was introduced on 26 November 2000.

Sources differ as to his age at the date of the swim. Gregory's own book states that he was 11 years and 333 days old, as does the 2025 book 150 Years of Swimming the Channel. The Channel Swimming Association states that he was 11 years 330 days old. His old school gives the figure of 11 years 336 days, as does a BBC article.

Gregory's coming-of-age story about being the youngest person to swim the Channel, A Boy in the Water (2018, Penguin: ISBN 9780241354124) was joint winner of the 2018 William Hill Sports Book of the Year. It was BBC Radio 4's Book of the Week in August 2018. He served in the Royal Anglian Regiment of the British Army.
