= Řitka =

- Municipality
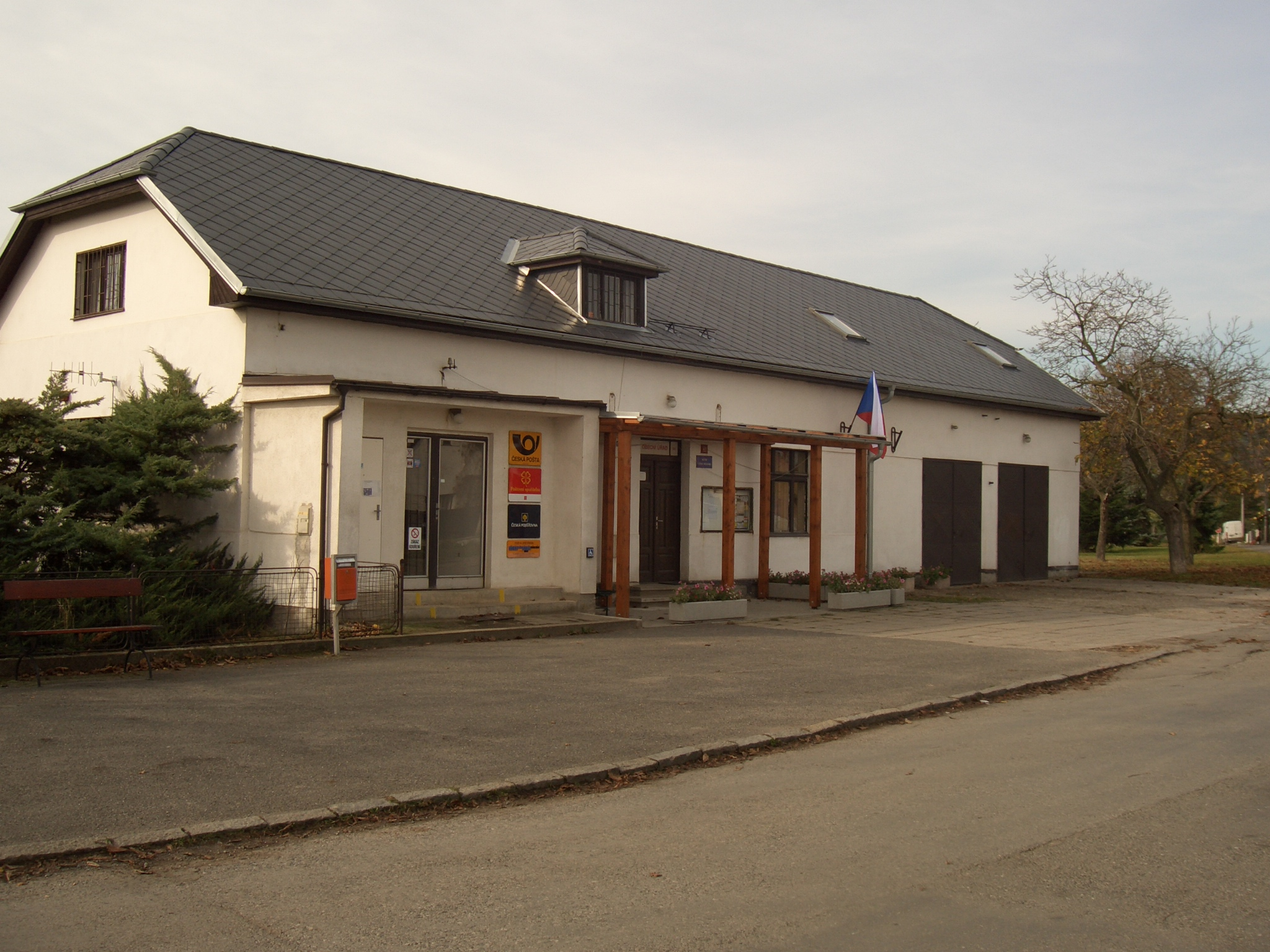
- Municipal office

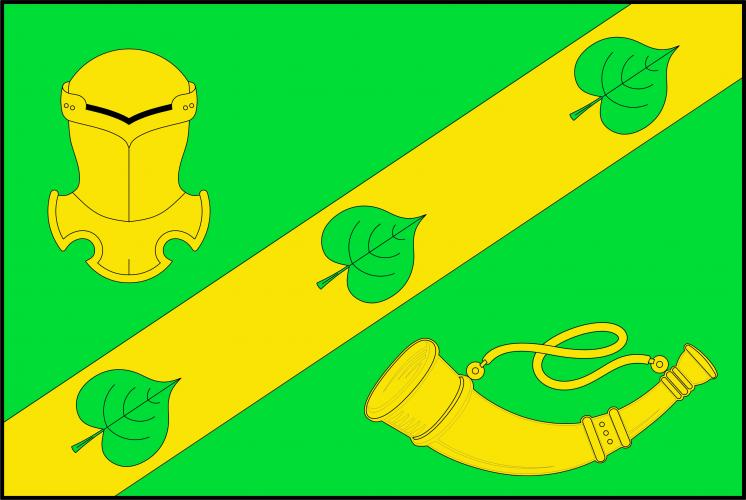
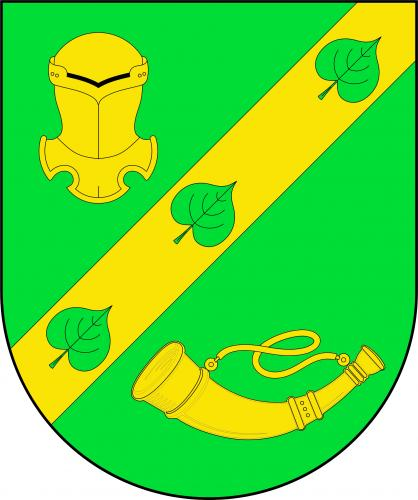
- Flag Coat of arms

- Location in the Czech Republic
- Coordinates: 49°53′40″N 14°17′58″E
- Country: Czech Republic
- Region: Central Bohemian
- District: Prague-West
- First mentioned: 1387

Area
  - Total: 3.94 km^{2} (1.52 sq mi)
- Elevation: 388 m (1,273 ft)

Population (2026-01-01)
  - Total: 1,411
  - Density: 358/km^{2} (928/sq mi)
- Time zone: UTC+1 (CET)
  - Summer (DST): UTC+2 (CEST)
- Postal code: 252 03
- Website: www.ritka.cz

Řitka is a municipality and village in Prague-West District in the Central Bohemian Region of the Czech Republic. It has about 1,400 inhabitants.

== Etymology ==
The village was initially called Lhotka (diminutive of Lhota), but soon was renamed Řitka (after the Řitka of Bezdědice family, a noble family in the region).

== Geography ==
Řitka is located about 15 kilometres (9 mi) southwest of Prague. Most of the municipality lies in the Hořovice Uplands, but the northern part lies in the Brdy Highlands. The highest point is at 515 m (1,690 ft) above sea level.

== History ==
The first written mention of Řitka is from 1387 (under the name Lhotka). The name Řitka was first documented in 1416.

== Demographics ==
Historical population

Year	Pop.	±%
1869	369	—
1880	363	−1.6%
1890	376	+3.6%
1900	380	+1.1%
1910	369	−2.9%

Year	Pop.	±%
1921	362	−1.9%
1930	351	−3.0%
1950	309	−12.0%
1961	334	+8.1%
1970	350	+4.8%

Year	Pop.	±%
1980	357	+2.0%
1991	440	+23.2%
2001	604	+37.3%
2011	1,110	+83.8%
2021	1,464	+31.9%

Source: Censuses

== Transport ==
The D4 motorway from Prague to Písek runs south of the municipality.

== Sights ==
The only cultural monument in Řitka is the Řitka Castle. It is a valuable complex of Baroque buildings. A fortress, which was first documented in 1416, was rebuilt into the castle in the mid-17th century. Today the castle complex houses a riding club and there is a training track for eventing.

== Notable people ==
- Wilhelm Weiss (1859–1904), mathematician
- Lata Brandisová (1895–1981), aristocrat and equestrian; lived here
