= A Life Too Short =

2010 book by Ronald Reng

A Life Too Short: The Tragedy of Robert Enke
- First edition (German)
- Author: Ronald Reng
- Original title: Ein allzu kurzes Leben
- Language: German
- Subject: Biography
- Genre: Biography
- Publisher: Random House UK
- Publication date: 2010
- Publication place: Germany
- Media type: Print (paperback)
- Pages: 400
- ISBN: 0224091662

A Life Too Short: The Tragedy of Robert Enke is a 2010 biography by Ronald Reng about the Hannover 96 captain and Germany Goalkeeper Robert Enke, who died by suicide after six years of depression on 10 November 2009.

== Synopsis ==
The book details the life of Robert Enke, particularly focusing on Enke's struggle with depression. Reng also focuses on his friendship with Enke, with whom he was supposed to co-write a biography.

== Reception ==
Critical reception for A Life Too Short has been positive, with the book receiving the 2011 William Hill Sports Book of the Year Award. The Guardian praised A Life too Short as "eloquent and sensitive", and William Hill co-founder Graham Sharpe stated it was "an outstanding piece of sportswriting".
