= Duncan Hamilton (journalist) =

British author and journalist (born 1958)

Duncan Hamilton (born December 1958) is a British author and newspaper journalist and three-time winner of the William Hill Sports Book of the Year award.

== Life and career ==
Hamilton was born in Newcastle-upon-Tyne, and his family moved to Nottinghamshire when he was four.

Hamilton was the Nottingham Evening Post's Nottingham Forest reporter during the club's glory years and covered both of Forest's victorious European Cup campaigns (1979 and 1980) for the newspaper. During his time covering Forest, Hamilton developed a close, if at times testy, relationship with the club's outspoken manager, Brian Clough. He won his first William Hill award with the 2007 memoir Provided You Don't Kiss Me: 20 Years With Brian Clough, an account of his time at the Nottingham Evening Post where he worked for more than 20 years. The book also won the Best Football Book category of the 2008 British Sports Book Awards.

In Provided You Don't Kiss Me, Hamilton claims he bonded with Clough after the manager learned he, like Clough, was from the north-east of England. He provides an eyewitness account of the relationship between Clough and his assistant, Peter Taylor, and charts Clough's demise and descent into alcoholism. FHM called the book a "superb portrait of the conflicted, contradictory man [that] doesn't duck his uglier aspects." It quickly became a bestseller and won the William Hill award against strong competition. After winning the £18,000 first prize, Hamilton wrote a column for the Yorkshire Post, where he was a deputy editor, expressing his surprise and delight at the book's success.

In 2009, Hamilton won a second William Hill award for Harold Larwood, a biography of the fast bowler Harold Larwood, who was a protagonist in the controversial "Bodyline" series between Australia and England in 1932–33. The book also won the Best Biography category of the 2010 British Sports Book Awards and was named the Wisden Book of the Year. In 2019 he won his third William Hill award for The Great Romantic: Cricket and the Golden Age of Neville Cardus.

After 32 years as a newspaper journalist in Nottingham and Leeds, Hamilton now works as a freelance, mostly concentrating on writing his books. He and his wife Mandy live in the village of Menston in West Yorkshire.

== Books ==
- Nottingham Forest FC: Thirty Great Years in Photographs, 1988 ISBN 9780948946363
- Provided You Don't Kiss Me: 20 Years with Brian Clough, 2007 ISBN 9780007247103
- Sweet Summers: The Classic Cricket Writing of JM Kilburn, 2008 ISBN 9781905080465 (edited)
- Fire and Ashes, 2009 ISBN 1848416520
- Harold Larwood, 2009 ISBN 9781847249494
- Old Big 'ead: The Wit and Wisdom of Brian Clough, 2009 ISBN 9781845134761 (edited)
- A Last English Summer, 2010 ISBN 9781849160933
- The Unreliable Life of Harry the Valet: The Great Victorian Jewel Thief, 2011 ISBN 9781407475578
- Wisden on Yorkshire: An Anthology, 2011 ISBN 9781408170397 (edited)
- The Footballer Who Could Fly: Living in My Father's Black and White World, 2012 ISBN 9781846059803
- Immortal: The Biography of George Best, 2013 ISBN 9781846059810
- For the Glory: The Life of Eric Liddell, 2016 ISBN 9781473508897
- A Clear Blue Sky, 2017 ISBN 9780008232672 (with Jonny Bairstow)
- The Kings of Summer: How Cricket's 2016 County Championship Came down to the Very Last Match of the Season, 2017 ISBN 9780993291128
- Going to the Match: The Passion for Football, 2019 ISBN 9781473661783
- The Great Romantic: Cricket and the Golden Age of Neville Cardus, 2019 ISBN 9781473661837
- One Long and Beautiful Summer: A Short Elegy for Red-Ball Cricket, 2020 ISBN 9781529408379
- Injury Time, 2022 ISBN 9781529408447 (novel)
- Answered Prayers: England and the 1966 World Cup, 2023 ISBN 9781529420012
