= Noelle McCarthy =

Irish–New Zealand writer and broadcaster

- Born: Noelle Maria McCarthy; 1978 or 1979 (age 46–47); Cork, Ireland
- Citizenship: Irish and New Zealand
- Education: University College Cork
- Occupations: Writer; radio broadcaster
- Notable work: Grand: Becoming my mother's daughter (2022)
- Spouse: John Daniell (m. 2018)
- Children: 1

Noelle Maria McCarthy (born 1978 or 1979) is an Irish-New Zealand writer and broadcaster. Having moved to New Zealand as a young woman, McCarthy became a radio broadcaster on Radio New Zealand and since 2017 has produced podcasts. Her memoir of her relationship with her mother, Grand: Becoming my mother's daughter, was published in 2022 and won the first book prize for general non-fiction at the 2023 Ockham New Zealand Book Awards.

== Early life and career ==
McCarthy was born and grew up in Cork, Ireland, where she attended St Angela's College and graduated from University College Cork with a degree in English and history. She moved to New Zealand in 2003 in her early twenties after a year of travelling in Asia and Australia.

From August 2004 to November 2006, McCarthy worked as news and editorial director at Auckland student radio station 95bFM, and in January 2007 began hosting talkback segments on Newstalk ZB. She spent eight years as a producer and presenter at Radio New Zealand, including running her own show, Summer Noelle, for several years on RNZ National. In 2008, before starting Summer Noelle, she apologised for plagiarising the work of British journalists while working as a presenter on another Radio New Zealand programme. In 2009 she quit drinking after identifying that she had become an alcoholic.

McCarthy and her husband, John Daniell, had a daughter in 2017 and were married the following year. Since 2017 they have made podcasts together as Birds of Paradise Productions. Their podcast, Getting Better, produced by McCarthy and Emma Espiner, won an award at the 2021 Voyager Media Awards.

== Grand and later career ==
In 2018 McCarthy began writing a memoir of her relationship with her mother, after moving with her family from Auckland to Featherston and after her mother was diagnosed with cancer. In 2020, she won the Short Memoir section of the Fish Publishing International Writing competition for "Buck Rabbit", a story in part based on her memoir writings. Following the award, she wrote a first draft of the full-length book in a memoir course led by Renée.

Grand: Becoming my mother's daughter was published in 2022, a year after the death of McCarthy's mother. The book's focus is McCarthy's relationship with her mother while growing up, including the latter's alcoholism and the influence that this had on McCarthy. It was selected as the best non-fiction of 2022 by Newsroom; reviewer Linda Burgess described McCarthy's writing as similar to her radio persona: "impulsive, fast, fluent and frighteningly bright". Steve Braunias called the work a "howl of anguish and love".

Grand received the E H McCormick Best First Book Award for General Non-Fiction at the 2023 Ockham New Zealand Book Awards. The award citation called it an "exquisite debut", with McCarthy's relationship with her mother "at times brutally detailed"; the book itself was termed "an uplifting memoir, delicate and self-aware, and a credit to McCarthy’s generosity and literary deftness".

In 2023, McCarthy was the writer-in-residence at the International Institute of Modern Letters. In the same year, Grand was published in the United Kingdom and Ireland. The Irish Independent described it as "remarkably funny, honest and often sad", and The Irish Times called McCarthy "a natural storyteller and an observant writer with a Sedaris-like eye for black humour".

Stakes, McCarthy's follow-up memoir to Grand, is due to be published in mid-2026.
