= Úmonín =

- Municipality
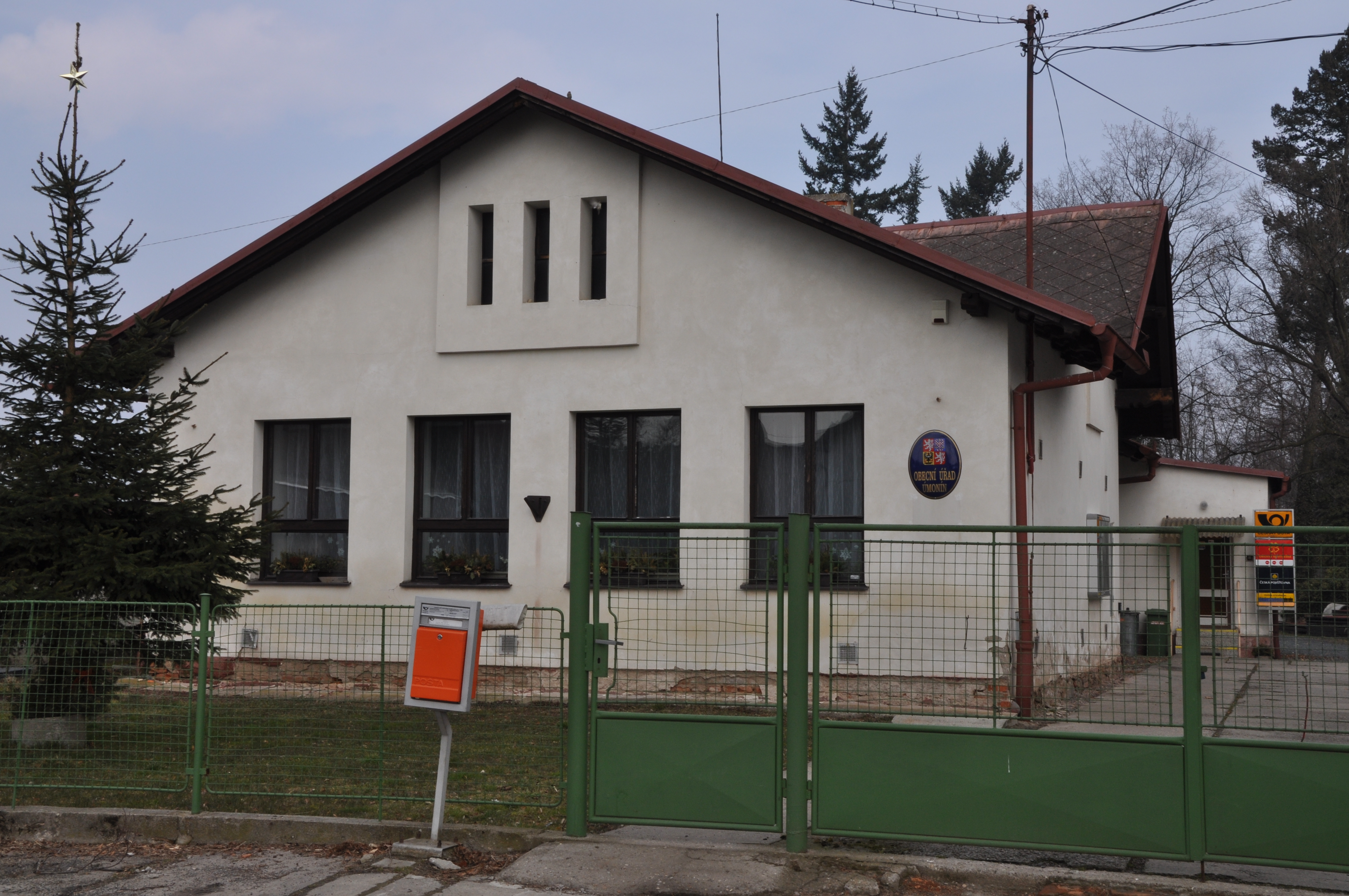
- Municipal office

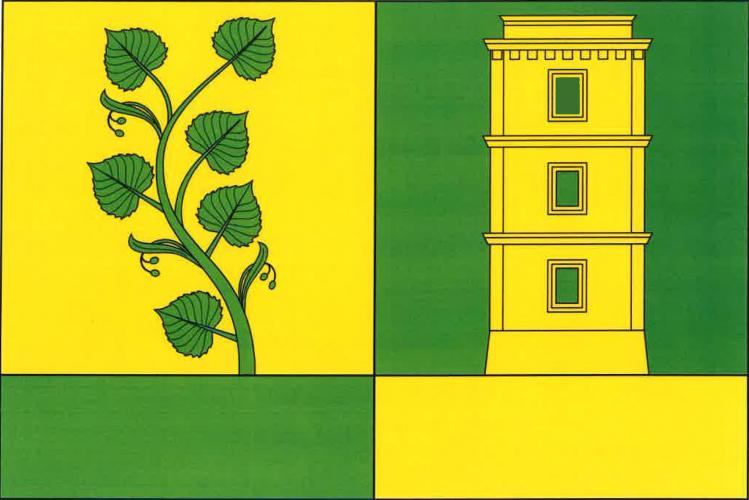
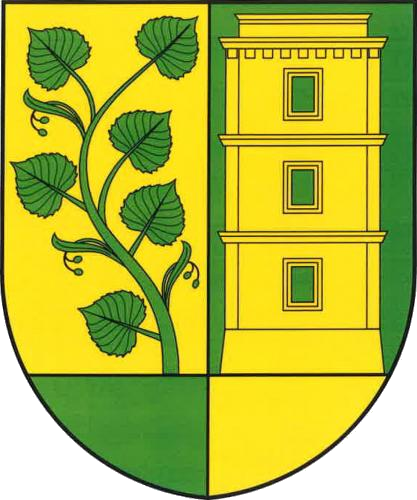
- Flag Coat of arms

- Location in the Czech Republic
- Coordinates: 49°53′19″N 15°16′17″E
- Country: Czech Republic
- Region: Central Bohemian
- District: Kutná Hora
- First mentioned: 1289

Area
  - Total: 13.75 km^{2} (5.31 sq mi)
- Elevation: 342 m (1,122 ft)

Population (2026-01-01)
  - Total: 545
  - Density: 39.6/km^{2} (103/sq mi)
- Time zone: UTC+1 (CET)
  - Summer (DST): UTC+2 (CEST)
- Postal code: 285 46
- Website: www.obecumonin.cz

Úmonín is a municipality and village in Kutná Hora District in the Central Bohemian Region of the Czech Republic. It has about 500 inhabitants.

== Administrative division ==
Úmonín consists of six municipal parts (in brackets population according to the 2021 census):

- Úmonín (172)
- Březová (69)
- Hájek (9)
- Korotice (94)
- Lomec (100)
- Lomeček (51)

== Demographics ==
Historical population
| Year | Pop. | ±% |
|---|---|---|
| 1869 | 1,320 | — |
| 1880 | 1,331 | +0.8% |
| 1890 | 1,314 | −1.3% |
| 1900 | 1,222 | −7.0% |
| 1910 | 1,144 | −6.4% |
| 1921 | 1,187 | +3.8% |
| 1930 | 1,049 | −11.6% |
| 1950 | 849 | −19.1% |
| 1961 | 749 | −11.8% |
| 1970 | 669 | −10.7% |
| 1980 | 537 | −19.7% |
| 1991 | 497 | −7.4% |
| 2001 | 423 | −14.9% |
| 2011 | 450 | +6.4% |
| 2021 | 495 | +10.0% |
Source: Censuses

== Notable people ==
- Lawrence of Březová (c. 1370 – c. 1437), historian and writer
- Rudolf Charousek (1873–1900), Czech-Hungarian chess player
- Lata Brandisová (1895–1981), aristocrat and equestrian
