= Wilhelm Weiss (mathematician) =

Austro-Hungarian mathematician (1859–1904)

- Born: 3 February 1859; Řitka, Bohemia
- Died: 18 June 1904 (aged 45); Prague, Austria-Hungary
- Education: University of Prague; Leipsic University; University of Erlangen

Wilhelm Weiss (German: Wilhelm Weiß; 3 February 1859 – 18 June 1904) was an Austro-Hungarian mathematician.

Weiss received his early education from his father, who was a teacher at Řitka; and from 1881 to 1887 he studied successively at the universities of Prague, Leipsic, and Erlangen, from where he obtained his Ph.D. in 1887. From 1887 to 1894 he was instructor in mathematics at the German Technical University in Prague, becoming lecturer in 1894, deputy professor in 1896, assistant professor in 1897, and professor in 1900. From 1901 to 1902 he was dean of the school of engineers at the same institution. He taught there until his death in June 1904.
