= Lata Brandisová =

Czech equestrian

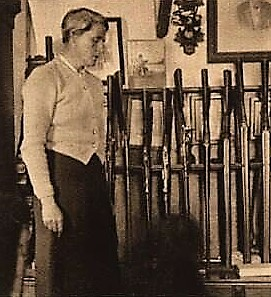
- Brandisová in 1938
- Born: Marie Immaculata Brandisová; 26 June 1895; Úmonín, Kingdom of Bohemia; Austria-Hungary
- Died: 12 May 1981 (aged 85); Reiteregg, Austria
- Noble family: Brandis
- Father: Count Leopold von Brandis
- Mother: Johanna von Schäffer
- Occupation: equestrian

Countess Marie Immaculata Brandisová, also known as Lata Brandisová or Lata von Brandis, (26 June 1895 – 12 May 1981) was a Czech equestrian and the only woman to win the Great Pardubice Steeplechase. Her victory over the Nazi officers at the 1937 race, seen as a symbol of Czech resistance against Nazi Germany, was celebrated with parades attended by thousands of people. She is the subject of Richard Askwith's book Unbreakable: The Woman Who Defied The Nazis In The World's Most Dangerous Horse Race.

== Early life and family ==
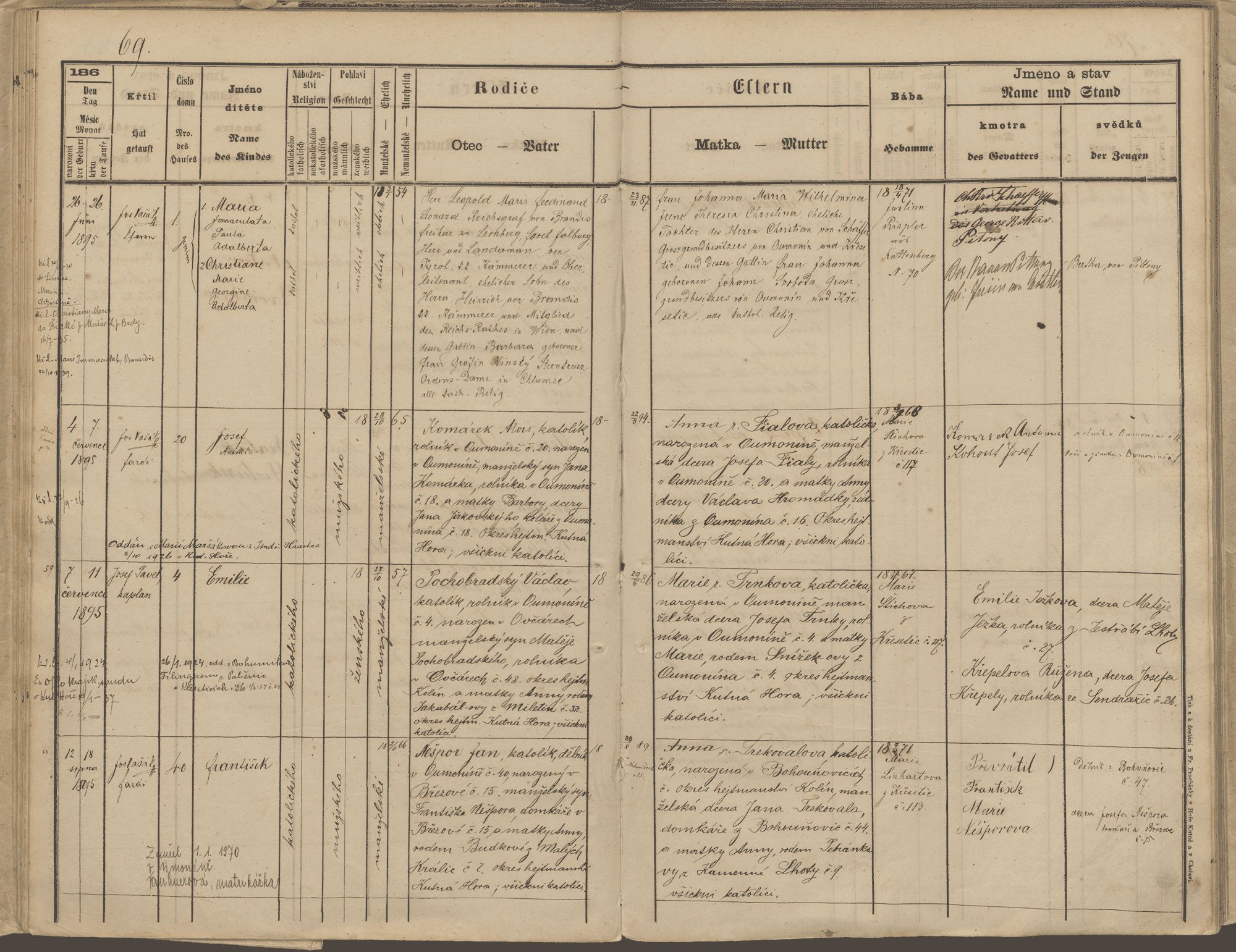
Marie Brandisová birth record

Brandisová was born on 26 June 1895 at Schäffer Castle in Úmonín, Austria-Hungary (now the Czech Republic) to Count Leopold von Brandis and Johanna von Schäffer. She was a member of an old Tyrolean family that had been ennobled in 1580, but later became impoverished. Her father, a horse breeder, had served as a lieutenant colonel in the Austrian army. Her mother was the daughter of Christian Ritter von Schäffer. Her paternal grandmother, Countess Barbara Kinská, was the sister of Count Oktavian Kinsky, who was one of the founders of the Great Pardubice Steeplechase. She had a twin sister, Countess Marie Kristýna Brandisová. In 1897 they moved from Schäffer Castle to a chateau in Řitka owned by her mother.

== Equestrian career ==
Brandisová began horseback riding when she was eight years old and grew up attending horse races with her father. In 1916, at the age of 21, she competed in her first horse race. During the First World War, her father and brother, Count Nicholas von Brandis, went off to fight. Her brother was killed in action in Italy. Much of their property was seized y the government during the war. After the establishment of Czechoslovakia, the family lost much of their remaining property. She continued her training at the Prague-Velká Chuchle Racecourse and, in 1921, won her first women's race.

In 1926 her cousin Count Zdenko Radslav Kinský, a nephew of Oktavian, invited her to Orlík Castle to breed Kinsky horses for hurdle racing. She continued to train as a horse racer at Velká Churchle and Veveří Castle under the coaching of Karel Šmejda. In 1927 she signed up to race in the Great Pardubice Steeplechase. Her enlistment in the race caused controversy, and she was faced with protests as the race was seen as too dangerous for a woman. Petitions were made to the Czechoslovak Jockey Club to have Brandisová removed from the race. The Jockey Club decided that she would be allowed to race, following advice from the Royal Jockey Club in Great Britain. The Great Pardubice of 1927 was the first time a woman raced, and the first time a French rider raced (Count Alexandre de la Forest). Brandisová placed fifth, after falling three times on the race track.

In 1933 she raced in the Great Pardubice on a mare named Norma and placed third. A year later she placed second, and in 1935 she placed fifth. In 1937 she raced with Norma in the 56th Great Pardubice. At this time, there was extreme tension between Czechoslovakia and the neighboring Nazi Germany, with the Czechs fearing an invasion. Over 40,000 people attended the race, hoping to see a Czech jockey defeat the Germans, who had been consecutive champions in the Great Pardubice over the last few years. On 17 October 1937, Brandisová became the first woman to win the race, seven lengths ahead of a German rider. Celebrations culminated with a 10,000 person parade from the racecourse to town square in Pardubice. The race was not held again until after World War II.

Germany invaded Czechoslavkia in 1939, and Brandisová's estate was seized by the Nazi government. During the war, she joined the Czech Resistance, providing food for resistance fighters and tending to wounded soldiers during the Liberation of Prague.

After the war, Brandisová raced again in the Grand Parduice, failing to finish in 1947. After the 1948 Czechoslovak coup d'état brought the country under Communist control, she and her sisters moved into cottage in the woods, where they lived in relative poverty throughout the Communist regime.

She died from pneumonia in Reiteregg, Austria on 12 May 1981.
