= Dangerous Hero =

2019 non-fiction book by Tom Bower

- First edition
- Author: Tom Bower
- Language: English
- Subject: Jeremy Corbyn
- Genre: Biography
- Publisher: William Collins
- Publication date: 2019

Dangerous Hero: Corbyn's Ruthless Plot for Power is a 2019 biography of British Labour Party leader Jeremy Corbyn written by British conservative writer, investigative journalist and biographer Tom Bower. It is an unfriendly portrait of Corbyn.

== Reception ==
Peter Oborne of Middle East Eye wrote the "new book on Labour Party leader Jeremy Corbyn, contains numerous falsehoods. It systematically omits relevant facts" and that "Again and again he [the author] withholds relevant information". Stephen Bush of The Guardian criticised the book as a "hatchet job, it is a dismal failure" and said it committed "rudimentary errors". A Labour Party spokesman stated it was "poorly researched and tawdry hatchet job... packed with obvious falsehoods and laughable claims." The Times called it "a bit of a bore". Matthew Norman of The Independent stated, "The only 'dirt' investigative journalist Tom Bower managed to dig up was the Labour leader's domestic amnesia and proneness to debt through helping those in need" and that the book "appears to contain a fatal paradox: on the one hand, as hinted by the subtitle Corbyn's Ruthless Plot for Power, [Corbyn] has plotted ruthlessly for power; on the other, the author reports that Corbyn was on the brink of retiring to Wiltshire to keep bees". VICE News stated that the book is "garbage" and full of factual errors.

According to journalist Gaby Hinsliff, who described the book as flawed, there is little that was new in the book because "We all know by now about the meetings with Holocaust deniers and perpetrators of blood libel, the somersaults turned to avoid blaming the Kremlin for the Salisbury poisonings, the long history of antipathy to the EU." The most "telling criticism," in Hinsliff's view, was that "Corbyn is simply not very bright... His backbench career was long on expressing passionate solidarity with causes but short on concrete achievements, and he comes across as prone to ducking arguments that he lacks the skill to win." She argued that the book's greatest flaw is Bower's eagerness to condemn its subject, but concludes that Dangerous Hero, "is the most compelling in-depth study so far of a man whose head is unusually difficult to get inside, given his suspicion of anyone who isn’t a fellow traveller." Ex-Labour MP Tom Harris wrote that the book is a "meticulous and highly readable account", that "stands as an indictment of both the Labour Party and a political system that allows an individual such as Jeremy Corbyn to come within shouting distance of the levers of power in the UK". A reviewer for The Times wrote that according to the book, the October 1968 Rodney riots in Kingston, Jamaica convinced Corbyn to become a Trotskyist with the goal of turning Britain into a communist state.

== Libel case ==
In June 2020, it was announced that Associated Newspapers, the publishers of The Mail on Sunday and MailOnline, paid substantial damages and costs over a "grotesque" libel made against a non-profit Palestinian refugee group in its serialisation of the book. Lawyers for the plaintiff, the Palestinian Return Centre, said: "Neither Mr Bower, the Mail nor HarperCollins (the publisher of the book) saw fit to properly verify the true position, nor to put the allegation to the PRC prior to publication." The news outlets have also published a correction and apology. HarperCollins and Bower had already withdrawn the allegation, explaining that the author had relied on a contemporaneous newspaper report of the incident that had not been amended or corrected.
