= Tom Bower =

British writer (born 1946)

- Born: Thomas Michael Bower; 28 September 1946 (age 80); England
- Spouse: Veronica Wadley, Baroness Fleet (m. 1985)
- Children: 4
- Writing career
- Language: English
- Genres: Journalism, biography

Thomas Michael Bower (born 28 September 1946) is a British writer and former BBC journalist and television producer. He is known for his investigative journalism and for his unauthorised biographies, often of business tycoons and newspaper proprietors.

Bower's books include unauthorised biographies of Robert Maxwell, Mohamed Al-Fayed, Conrad Black, Richard Branson, Jeremy Corbyn and Boris Johnson. A book about Richard Desmond remains unpublished. His book, Broken Dreams: Vanity, Greed and the Souring of British Football, won the 2003 William Hill Sports Book of the Year.

== Early life ==
Bower was born in London in 1946. His parents were Jewish refugees who fled Prague after the German occupation of Czechoslovakia in March 1939 and arrived in London later that same year. They married in London in early 1943. From 1948, Tom's father Jiri Gerhard Bauer renounced the use of the surname Bauer for the family, and called himself George Gerald Bower, a change he confirmed by deed poll on 15 May 1957.

After attending the William Ellis School in Highgate, Bower studied law at the London School of Economics, before working as a barrister for the National Council of Civil Liberties. Bower says that during this period he was a Marxist, being nicknamed "Tommy the Red".

== BBC career ==
In 1970, Bower joined the BBC as a researcher on the programme 24 Hours before becoming a reporter on Panorama. He was a producer on Panorama from 1975 until 1987. He left the BBC in 1995.

== Books and journalism ==
Bower's first book was Blind Eye to Murder (1980), the first exposé based on eyewitnesses and newly released archives in London and Washington of the Allied failure after 1945 to hunt down Nazi war criminals and de-Nazify West Germany. The book was serialised in The Times and was the basis of a BBC TV documentary.

Bower's second book was Klaus Barbie: The Butcher of Lyon (1984) which documented Klaus Barbie's war crimes during World War II as head of the Gestapo in Lyon, France and his postwar work for the American intelligence agency Counterintelligence Corps (CIC) and South American narcotics and arms dealers. Bower's book was serialised in The Times in September 1983. Neal Ascherson positively reviewed the book in The Observer in January 1984.

=== Robert Maxwell ===
In 1987, Robert Maxwell responded to the publication of two unauthorised biographies of himself with numerous lawsuits, threats of legal action against individual booksellers, and the rapid publication of an authorised biography by Joe Haines, political editor of the Mirror Group which Maxwell owned. Of the two unauthorised books, Maxwell: A Portrait of Power by Peter Thompson and Anthony Delano was withdrawn from sale and all unsold copies pulped after Maxwell successfully sued the publishers and authors for libel. The second book, Maxwell: The Outsider by Bower sold out in hardback but Maxwell prevented the paperback edition appearing, in part by buying the publishing company which held the paperback rights. Maxwell also filed a libel action against Bower and the hardback publishers, Aurum Press. Maxwell allowed this action to lapse in 1990 but only after Bower and Aurum had submitted a detailed defence of the book.

Maxwell also tried to sue Bower in the English courts over an article published in America, by the magazine The New Republic, on the basis that it had 136 British subscribers. Bower also believes that Maxwell tried to break into his house and also went through his phone records and bank statements.

=== Tiny Rowland ===
In 1993, Bower published a biography of Lonrho tycoon Tiny Rowland, entitled Tiny Rowland. A Rebel Tycoon (London, Heinemann, 1993).

=== Swiss Banks ===
In 1997, Bower published Blood Money: The Swiss, the Nazis and the Looted Billions detailing his thesis of how the Swiss Government and the Swiss Banks colluded to prevent the return of Jewish-owned World War II-era bank accounts to their rightful owners until the World Jewish Congress filed suit in 1995.

In his testimony to the United States Senate Banking Committee in May 1997, Bower accused the Swiss government of "delay, deception and dishonesty" in the retrieval of Jewish-owned funds and stated that he had "grave doubts" whether the Bergier commission which was being set up, to investigate Switzerland's WWII conduct, would "provide an acceptable account". Regarding his testimony and book, Bower was criticized by some commentators for predominantly relying on, and rehashing, information from the Swiss Federal Archives that had already been made public by Swiss historians and others. One such example regarded a 'secret' Swiss treaty with Poland which The New York Times had covered in 1949, and which the historian Peter Hug (together with Marc Perrenoud) had produced a report on, in 1996, for the Swiss government. Jacques Picard, a Swiss historian, had published work in 1993 covering the 1957 information request to the Swiss government by Harald Huber, a member of parliament, regarding the suspected existence of dormant accounts in Switzerland. In his testimony, Bower presented the findings regarding Huber as if they were novel, adding that "Among the Swiss lines of defense is that there is nothing new in [Bower's] allegations. Were that to be true - that would be shocking. It would mean that Swiss historians have known for many years about the deception but have refused to publicize deprecatory information".

=== Richard Branson ===
In 2000, Richard Branson sued Bower for libel over an article he had written for the London Evening Standard in 1999. Branson chose not to sue the paper, but its editor, Max Hastings, agreed the newspaper would fund Bower's defence. Branson lost the case, and later expressed regret at bringing the action. Bower continues to write articles critical of Branson's business affairs, and published biographies of him in 2000 and 2014.

=== Geoffrey Robinson MP ===
In 2001, Bower published The Paymaster: Geoffrey Robinson, Maxwell and New Labour, a biography of the Labour MP Geoffrey Robinson. The book's evidence that Robinson had solicited a £200,000 business contract from Robert Maxwell led to Robinson being suspended from Parliament for three weeks as he had not disclosed the matter to an inquiry some years previously. Robinson denied receiving the money in question from Maxwell and denied that he had sought to mislead Parliament.

=== English football ===
In 2003, Bower won the William Hill Sports Book of the Year Award for Broken Dreams: Vanity, Greed and the Souring of British Football, an investigation into corruption in English football.

=== Conrad Black ===
Bower's joint biography of Conrad Black and Barbara Amiel Conrad and Lady Black: Dancing on the Edge was published in November 2006. In February 2007, Black filed a libel suit in Toronto against Bower over the contents of the book. The suit was frozen when Black was convicted of fraud and imprisoned.

=== Richard Desmond ===
The Daily Express proprietor Richard Desmond brought a libel action against Bower over a passing reference in Dancing on the Edge. Bower wrote that Desmond had been "ground into the dust" by Black in a business dispute. Desmond claimed this weakened his "super-tough" reputation as a businessman and was therefore defamatory. Bower denied libel on the grounds of the story being "substantially true". The action was heard in July 2009 and Desmond lost the case. An unauthorised biography by Bower of Richard Desmond, titled Rough Trader, was written and printed in 2006, but still awaits publication.

=== Latest works ===
In 2011 Bower published a biography of the Formula One executive Bernie Ecclestone titled No Angel: The Secret Life of Bernie Ecclestone. Ecclestone cooperated with Bower in the writing of the book, facilitating introductions to people for Bower. Over lunch Ecclestone told Bower "You write what you like, provided it's more or less the truth, because I'm no angel". Ecclestone's quote provided the title for the book. Ecclestone became friends with Bower and would say to him "What can I do that's evil for you?"

Bower's biography of the music executive and entertainment impresario Simon Cowell, Sweet Revenge: The Intimate Life of Simon Cowell, was written with Cowell's co-operation and published in April 2012. Cowell later said that Ecclestone had advised him to co-operate with Bower. The title of the book refers to Cowell's relationship with fellow entertainment impresario Simon Fuller. Though Cowell had given Bower some 200 hours of access to him, Bower subsequently said that Cowell had tried to restrict his access to sources. Cowell contacted Bower after the book's publication to say that he had found it "a bit embarrassing", adding "you got things I didn't know you'd got." Bower has secured Cowell's co-operation for a planned sequel to the book.

Broken Vows – Tony Blair: The Tragedy of Power, was published in March 2016.

Rebel Prince, which describes Prince Charles's attempts to recover his popularity after the death of Diana, Princess of Wales, reached number one in the Sunday Times bestseller list and was serialised in the Daily Mail.

In 2019, a biography of Labour party leader Jeremy Corbyn, Dangerous Hero, was published. Serialised at length in the Mail on Sunday, it was a number two Sunday Times bestseller. The book accused Corbyn of being an anti-Semitic Marxist. It was seriously criticised by Peter Oborne, writing in Middle East Eye, for its lack of referencing, alleged factual errors and the systematic omittance of relevant facts. Stephen Bush, writing in The Guardian, referred to the book as a "hatchet job" littered with "rudimentary errors" and journalist Oscar Rickett called it "garbage". In the book, he made false allegations against the Palestinian Return Centre. Along with the publisher HarperCollins he made a full, unqualified withdrawal of the allegations, but neither apologised nor paid any money to the complainant or the lawyers. The allegations are to be removed from all future editions of the book. The Mail on Sunday and MailOnline which serialised the book had to pay full damages and issue a written apology.

The biography Boris Johnson: The Gambler was published by WH Allen on 15 October 2020 and has been noted for being sympathetic about the subject of the biography, in contrast with some of Bower's previous works.

He has also written a column for The Spectator.

== Personal life ==
Bower is married to Veronica Wadley, Baroness Fleet, former editor of the London Evening Standard, with whom he has two children. Bower also has two sons from a previous marriage. They live in London.

== Bibliography ==
Biographical subject noted before title:

- Blind Eye to Murder: The Pledge Betrayed (1981) ISBN 978-0-233-97292-3
- Klaus Barbie – Klaus Barbie: Butcher of Lyon (1984) ISBN 978-0-552-12548-2
- The Paperclip Conspiracy (1987) ISBN 978-0-586-08686-5
- Red Web (1989) ISBN 978-0-749-31478-1
- Robert Maxwell – Maxwell: The Outsider (1991) ISBN 978-0-749-30238-2
- Tiny Rowland – Tiny Rowland: A Rebel Tycoon (1993) ISBN 978-0-434-07339-9
- Dick White – The Perfect English Spy: Sir Dick White and the Secret War, 1935–90 (1995) ISBN 978-0-749-32332-5
- Heroes of World War II (1995) ISBN 978-0-752-21674-4
- Robert Maxwell – Maxwell: The Final Verdict (1996) ISBN 978-0-007-29287-5
- Nazi Gold (1997) ISBN 978-0-060-17535-1
- Blood Money: The Swiss, the Nazis and the Looted Billions (1997) ISBN 978-0-330-35395-3
- Mohamed Al-Fayed – Fayed: The Unauthorized Biography (1998) ISBN 978-0-330-37239-8
  - later republished as The Fall of Fayed: Lies, Greed and Scandal (2025) ISBN 978-1-785-12714-4
- Richard Branson – Branson (2000) ISBN 1-84115-400-8
- Geoffrey Robinson – The Paymaster: Geoffrey Robinson, Maxwell and New Labour (2001) ISBN 978-0-743-41572-9
- Broken Dreams: Vanity, Greed and the Souring of British Football (2003) ISBN 978-1-847-39003-5
- Gordon Brown – Gordon Brown (2004) ISBN 978-0-007-17540-6
- Conrad Black and Barbara Amiel – Conrad and Lady Black: Dancing on the Edge (2006) ISBN 978-0-007-23234-5
- The Squeeze: Oil, Money and Greed in the 21st Century (2010) ISBN 0-446-54798-0
- Bernie Ecclestone – No Angel: The Secret Life of Bernie Ecclestone (2011) ISBN 978-0-571-26929-7
- Simon Cowell – Sweet Revenge: The Intimate Life of Simon Cowell (2012) ISBN 978-0-571-27835-0
- Richard Branson – Branson: Behind the Mask (2014) ISBN 978-0-571-29709-2
- Tony Blair – Broken Vows: Tony Blair and the Tragedy of Power (2016) ISBN 978-0-571-31420-1
- Charles, Prince of Wales – Rebel Prince: The Power, Passion and Defiance of Prince Charles (2018) ISBN 978-0-008-29173-0
  - later republished as Rebel King: The Making of a Monarch (2023) ISBN 978-0-008-29177-8
- Jeremy Corbyn – Dangerous Hero: Corbyn's Ruthless Plot for Power (2019) ISBN 978-0-008-29957-6
- Boris Johnson – Boris Johnson: The Gambler (2020) ISBN 978-0-753-55490-6
- Meghan, Duchess of Sussex and Prince Harry, Duke of Sussex – Revenge: Meghan, Harry and the war between the Windsors (2022) ISBN 978-1-788-70503-5
- David Beckham and Victoria Beckham – The House of Beckham: Money, Sex and Power (2024) ISBN 978-0-008-63887-0
- Meghan, Duchess of Sussex and Prince Harry, Duke of Sussex – Betrayal: Power, Deceit and the Fight for the Future of the Royal Family (2026) ISBN 978-1-785-12640-6

Preceded by Donald McRae	William Hill Sports Book of the Year winner 2003	Succeeded by Peter Oborne
