= The Game of Our Lives =

Book by David Goldblatt (2014)

The Game of Our Lives: The Meaning and Making of English Football
- Author: David Goldblatt
- Language: English
- Genre: football
- Published: 2014, Penguin Books, London
- Publication place: United Kingdom

The Game of Our Lives: The Meaning and Making of English Football is a book by David Goldblatt, first published in 2014. It looks at the development of football in England from the 1990s onwards, and at how the footballing culture reflected changes in wider English culture. The book was named the 2015 William Hill Sports Book of the Year.
