= Leo McKinstry =

British journalist (born 1962)

Leo McKinstry (born 1962) is a British journalist, historian and author.

== Life and career ==
Born in Belfast, Northern Ireland, McKinstry was educated at Portora Royal School, Enniskillen, and Sidney Sussex College, Cambridge, where he graduated with a degree in history in 1985. On leaving Cambridge, his first jobs were with the Northern Ireland Housing Executive, Ulster Architect magazine, and Tellex, a news monitoring service before he became immersed in Labour politics. He writes regularly for several newspapers in the United Kingdom, including the Daily Mail, Daily Express, and The Sunday Telegraph. He often writes about issues relating to immigration and the European Union, being a strong supporter of Brexit. His books include a biography of the Victorian Prime Minister, Lord Rosebery.

In the early 1990s, McKinstry was a Labour councillor in Islington and worked as a parliamentary aide to Labour politician Harriet Harman. Losing his seat on Islington council in 1994, he was working for Labour frontbencher Doug Henderson when he announced the following year, via an article in The Spectator, that he no longer supported the party. Subsequently, he was a regular columnist in both the Daily Mail and the Daily Express.

McKinstry is married and lives in Thanet, Kent and North-West France. He was diagnosed with Parkinson's Disease in 2019.

== Awards and honours ==
- 2003 British Sports Book Awards (Best Biography), Jack & Bobby
- 2006 Channel Four Political Book of the Year Rosebery: Statesman in Turmoil
- 2007 British Sports Book Awards (Best Football Book), Sir Alf
- 2025 Vitality Cricket Media Club Book of the Year Bill Edrich

== Bibliography ==
- Fit to Govern: A Former Labour Activist Asks: Can Tony Blair's Party be Trusted to Run Britain? (1996), Bantam Press, ISBN 0593039807
- ′′Turning the Tide: A personal Manifesto for Modern Britain.′′|(1997) Michael Joseph ISBN 0718142306
- Boycs: The True Story (2000), Partridge Press, ISBN 1852252790
- Jack and Bobby: A story of brothers in conflict (2002), HarperCollins UK, ISBN 0007118767
- Rosebery: Statesman in Turmoil (2005), John Murray Publishers, ISBN 0719558794
- Sir Alf: A Major Reappraisal of the Life and Times of England's Greatest Football Manager (2006), HarperCollins UK, ISBN 0007193785
- Spitfire: Portrait of a Legend (2007), Hodder & Stoughton, ISBN 0719568757
- Lancaster: The Second World War's Greatest Bomber (2009), Hodder & Stoughton, ISBN 0719523532
- Hurricane: Victor of the Battle of Britain (2010), Hodder & Stoughton, ISBN 1848543395
- Jack Hobbs: England's Greatest Cricketer (2011), Yellow Jersey Press, ISBN 0224083295
- Operation Sea Lion: How Britain Crushed the German War Machine's Dreams of Invasion in 1940 (2015), Harry N. Abrams, ISBN 9781468312560
- Attlee and Churchill: Allies in War, Adversaries in Peace (2020), Atlantic Books, ISBN 1848876610
- Cinderella Boys: The Forgotten RAF Force that Won the Battle of the Atlantic (2023), John Murray, ISBN 1529319366
- Bill Edrich: The Many Lives of England's Cricket Great (2024), Bloomsbury Sport ISBN 9781399407847
