= Sweet Revenge: The Intimate Life of Simon Cowell =

2012 biography by Tom Bower

- The cover of the 2012 first edition hardback
- Author: Tom Bower
- Language: English
- Subject: Simon Cowell
- Published: 2012 (Faber and Faber)
- Publication place: United Kingdom
- Pages: 444 pp (first edition)
- ISBN: 978-0-571-27837-4

Sweet Revenge: The Intimate Life of Simon Cowell is a 2012 biography of the British music and entertainment figure Simon Cowell by the British investigative journalist and biographer Tom Bower. Cowell cooperated with the book and a sequel is planned. The book received a mixed reception from critics.

== Background ==
A friend had suggested to Bower that he write Cowell's biography, feeling that Cowell's life fitted Bower's "track record of writing about men with power and money". Bower subsequently received a call inviting him to meet Cowell, after he had commenced research on the book, and Cowell agreed to cooperate, subject to Bower's condition that he would "publish criticism and any evidence of wrongdoing". The pair would subsequently meet in London and Los Angeles and have many telephone conversations as part of the writing process. Bower spent time at Cowell's various homes and traveled with him as he researched the biography. Cowell was not aware of the exact contents of the book prior to its publication.

Though Cowell had given Bower some 200 hours of access to him, Bower subsequently said that Cowell had tried to restrict his access to sources. In Bower's presence, Cowell told his friend Sinitta that she was not allowed to speak to Bower, and as compensation for not speaking to Sinitta, Bower was allowed to speak to Cowell's mother. Sinitta later confirmed that she had given a verbal agreement to Cowell not to contribute to the biography. Cowell's fellow entertainment manager, Simon Fuller, also refused to cooperate with Bower after apparently finding out that a colleague of Cowell's was not supporting the book.

The title of the book refers to Cowell's relationship with fellow entertainment impresario Simon Fuller.

== Contents ==
The book consists of 18 chapters with an introduction. The book opens with Cowell on holiday in the South of France during the opening week of The American X Factor, and continues through his childhood an early career in music publishing, as an A&R manager for RCA and the creation of his various Pop Idol and The X Factor franchises and his personal and business relationships including Simon Fuller, Cheryl, Louis Walsh, and Philip Green. It concludes with the relaunch of The X Factor in the United States in 2012.

== Reception ==
Sweet Revenge received mixed reviews from critics, who cited the apparent lack of revelations in the book. The writer Lynn Barber, in her Sunday Times review of Sweet Revenge, wrote that "According to the tabloids, Cowell now regrets co-operating on the book but I don't see why. Bower has not produced any really damaging revelations." Barber also commented that Bower failed to answer "the question of whether Cowell's shows are in any way fixed". In his review for the Daily Telegraph, Mark Sanderson wrote that "...shackled by its subject's co-operation, this bloated book turns out to be an enervating catalogue of small-screen meetings and tabloid affairs. The man behind the smirk and bad haircut remains a mystery."

Barbara Ellen gave a favourable review of Sweet Revenge for The Guardian commenting that "What's left to say about this 'unauthorised' (sort of), hilarious (definitely) book except: how could anyone be angry or upset about it? ... A lone cover-quote from Cowell says: 'People have taken advantage of me in the past. I have a long memory and I've been very patient. One day I'll get my revenge.' Oh dear, you think, someone's in a mood." Ellen concluded that Sweet Revenge "is a must-buy hoot and, certainly in the initial pre-fame half, Cowell never looked funnier or more lovable." Another reviewer writing for The Guardian, Marina Hyde, likened Bower's quest to examine Cowell to the plot of Citizen Kane, stating that "As for Cowell's own motivations, the revenge narrative that so dominates the book is not wholly convincing". Hyde enjoyed Bower's recollections of Cowell's "grimly entertaining tales of [his] shows' micromanagement" and concluded that "...Alas, Cowell's Rosebud eludes this book. Perhaps even now the flames are licking round a metaphorical sled, whose symbolism will never be disclosed. Or perhaps there is nothing there – a vast nullity at the heart of the man able to hold so many in his thrall".

== Release ==
Cowell contacted Bower after the publication of Sweet Revenge and said he had found the book "a bit embarrassing" adding "...you got things I didn't know you'd got". The Sun paid around £100,000 to serialise Sweet Revenge in the week before its publication. Sweet Revenge was the subject of John Crace's comedic parody series "Digested Read" in The Guardian in May 2012.

The launch party for the book was held at the Serpentine Gallery in Hyde Park, in a speech at the party Cowell apologised to anyone embarrassed by the biography. In his speech Cowell said that "...I spent last week under a pillow in my bedroom. Newspapers were literally banned for a week ... When I first got the call saying someone was writing a book about me I said 'good, who is it?' They said 'Tom Bower'. Not good." Cowell said that Bower's previous biographical subject, the Formula One executive Bernie Ecclestone, had advised him to cooperate with Bower. Cowell likened his relationship with Bower to the relationship between a captor with Stockholm syndrome and their kidnapper. Cowell also joked in his speech that he was planning to write a book called The Sordid Sex Life of Tom Bower. Bower said at the party that "I've had 20 victims and this is the first time anyone I've written about has wanted to celebrate ... I reckon there must be something wrong with my writing but I am well assured Simon doesn't like me very much."

Bower has secured Cowell's cooperation for a planned sequel to the book.

== Bibliography ==
- Bower, Tom (2012). Sweet Revenge: The Intimate Life of Simon Cowell (paperback ed.). London: Faber and Faber. ISBN 978-0-571-27837-4.
