= Donald McRae (author) =

South African writer (born 1961)

Donald McRae (born 1961) is a South African writer. He has written about sports for The Guardian since 2003.

Born in Germiston in 1961, he moved to the United Kingdom in 1984 to avoid military service in the Apartheid era South African Army.

McRae is noted as the only two-time winner of the William Hill Sports Book of the Year award with Dark Trade: Lost in Boxing in 1996 (2nd ed. Hamilcar Publications, 2019) and In Black and White: The Untold Story of Joe Louis and Jesse Owens in 2002. His other works include Winter Colours (1999), Every Second Counts: the Race to Transplant the First Human Heart (New York: G. P. Putnam's Sons, 2006), The Great Trials of Clarence Darrow: The Landmark Cases of Leopold and Loeb, John T. Scopes, and Ossian Sweet, published in 2009, A Man’s World: The Double Life of Emile Griffith (Simon & Schuster, 2015), Steven Gerrard: My Story (Joseph/Penguin, 2015), and In Sunshine Or In Shadow: How Boxing Brought Hope In The Troubles.

Preceded by Laura Hillenbrand	William Hill Sports Book of the Year winner 2002	Succeeded by Tom Bower
Preceded by John Feinstein	William Hill Sports Book of the Year winner 1996	Succeeded by Simon Hughes
