= Rebel Prince (book) =

2018 biography by Tom Bower

- First edition
- Author: Tom Bower
- Language: English
- Subject: Charles III; British royal family
- Genre: Biography
- Publisher: William Collins
- Publication date: 22 March 2018
- Publication place: United Kingdom
- Media type: Print
- Pages: 384
- ISBN: 9780008291730

Rebel Prince: The Power, Passion and Defiance of Prince Charles is a 2018 book by Tom Bower about Charles, Prince of Wales, who would later ascend the throne as Charles III. The book was originally published by William Collins in March 2018. Following Charles's ascension, an updated and revised version, Rebel King: The Making of a Monarch, was published in 2023. Bower stated that he interviewed 120 people for the book. An excerpt from the book was published in the Daily Mail ahead of its release.

== Claims ==
Bower claims in the book that Charles's sons, Princes William and Harry, saw the presence of Camilla Parker Bowles in their lives as "a constant reminder of their mother's torment", which had made them use the servants' entrance at Clarence House to avoid the couple. The book mentions that Queen Elizabeth II initially forbade the couple from moving to Clarence House as "the prospect of Charles entertaining Camilla in a palace shared with his grandmother, then aged 92, was offensive." Bower mentions that in the hours after his former wife Diana's death, Charles was "paralysed by guilt", chanting, "They're all going to blame me, aren't they? The world's going to go completely mad." Bower claimed the Queen replied "Forked if I know. You sort it out. I want to watch the racing on the television." The book recounts how in 1998 at Balmoral, Charles had pushed the Queen to accept Camilla but after a few drinks she blamed her for the breakdown of his marriage, stating "That wicked woman. I want nothing to do with her." Charles's aunt, Princess Margaret, was allegedly unsuccessful in her attempts in swaying the Queen. Bower mentioned how Charles was "inconsolable" after the Queen and his father Prince Philip did not attend his marriage ceremony to Camilla but were only present at the service of prayer and dedication. Bower claims that in the run up to the wedding, the Queen did not invite Camilla to official functions and "even hinted that there was very little special Welsh gold left to make Camilla's wedding ring".

Bower details Charles's jealousy of William and his wife, Catherine, Duchess of Cambridge, following their 2011 royal tour of Canada, which resulted in his own tour being postponed, while Camilla had a more relaxed approach and laughed it off when one suggested that Catherine would be the UK's first commoner queen saying "That'll be me". He claimed in the book that Charles had snubbed Carole Middleton, his son's mother-in-law, after Prince William and Catherine had decided to spend Christmas with Catherine's family in Bucklebury instead of with the royal family at Sandringham in Norfolk. This prompted William to ask the Queen to intervene, which she eventually did by inviting Middleton to Balmoral.

Bower also detailed Charles's lifestyle. He described him as super self-indulgent with a fondness for finery, private planes and trains, which according to Bower was a form of revenge against his father, who had forced Charles to attend the unluxurious Gordonstoun in Scotland. He allegedly took the royal train from Highgrove to Penrith to visit a pub, a journey that cost £18,916. Bower detailed how before a visit to a friend, Charles dispatched "a truck to ferry the entire contents of his and wife Camilla's bedrooms". This included "his own mattress, toilet seat, Kleenex Velvet toilet paper and two 'landscapes of the Scottish Highlands'". He also reportedly brought his own food and cocktails, in contrast to his mother the Queen who ate whatever was being served by her hosts. His pre-mixed cocktails were allegedly carried by a police officer when going to functions. He is said to have once shrieked at the sight of a cling film covering leftover food following a function at Clarence House.

Bower claimed Charles employed more than 120 staff members. Among them were three footmen who escort visitors to his office, each assigned to cover a specific section of the corridor. He also had four valets who assisted him with changing clothes as many as five times daily. In addition, four gardeners carefully removed weeds by lying face down on a trailer and pulling them out by hand because the prince disliked pesticides. Bower also mentioned that retired Indian servicemen patrolled the gardens at night with torches, picking slugs off the plants by hand. According to Bower, Charles was obsessed with public opinion and would throw objects at the radio when "enraged by an item ... The set was always being repaired". Bower alleged that access to Charles was effectively sold in order to generate funds for his numerous charities and to support a lavish lifestyle. He claimed that Turkish billionaire Cem Uzan paid £200,000 in 2000 so that his wife could be seated next to the prince at a dinner. Bower also wrote that American oil magnate Armand Hammer spent about £40 million over several years on Charles's charities and personal costs in an effort to improve his public reputation.

== Feedback and reception ==
During a tour of Australia a reporter from Brisbane's Hit 105 station asked Charles about the claim in the book that he would have servants bring his personal items including "a toilet seat" on long journeys, to which he responded "My own what? Oh, don't believe all that crap. The very idea." Camilla also added "Don't you believe that."

Writing for The Guardian, Bee Wilson argued that Rebel Prince portrayed Charles as vain, privileged, manipulative, and often petty through a barrage of negative anecdotes and anonymous sources, creating a gripping but one-sided "hatchet job" that raises doubts about the book's fairness and reliability while suggesting that Charles's unusual, lifelong position as heir may partly explain—but not excuse—the troubling character the biography depicts.

Lynn Barber of The Times described the book as a "sensational" biography portraying Charles III as petulant, selfish, and manipulative, while also depicting Camilla unfavourably.
