= David Goldblatt (writer) =

British journalist, born 1965

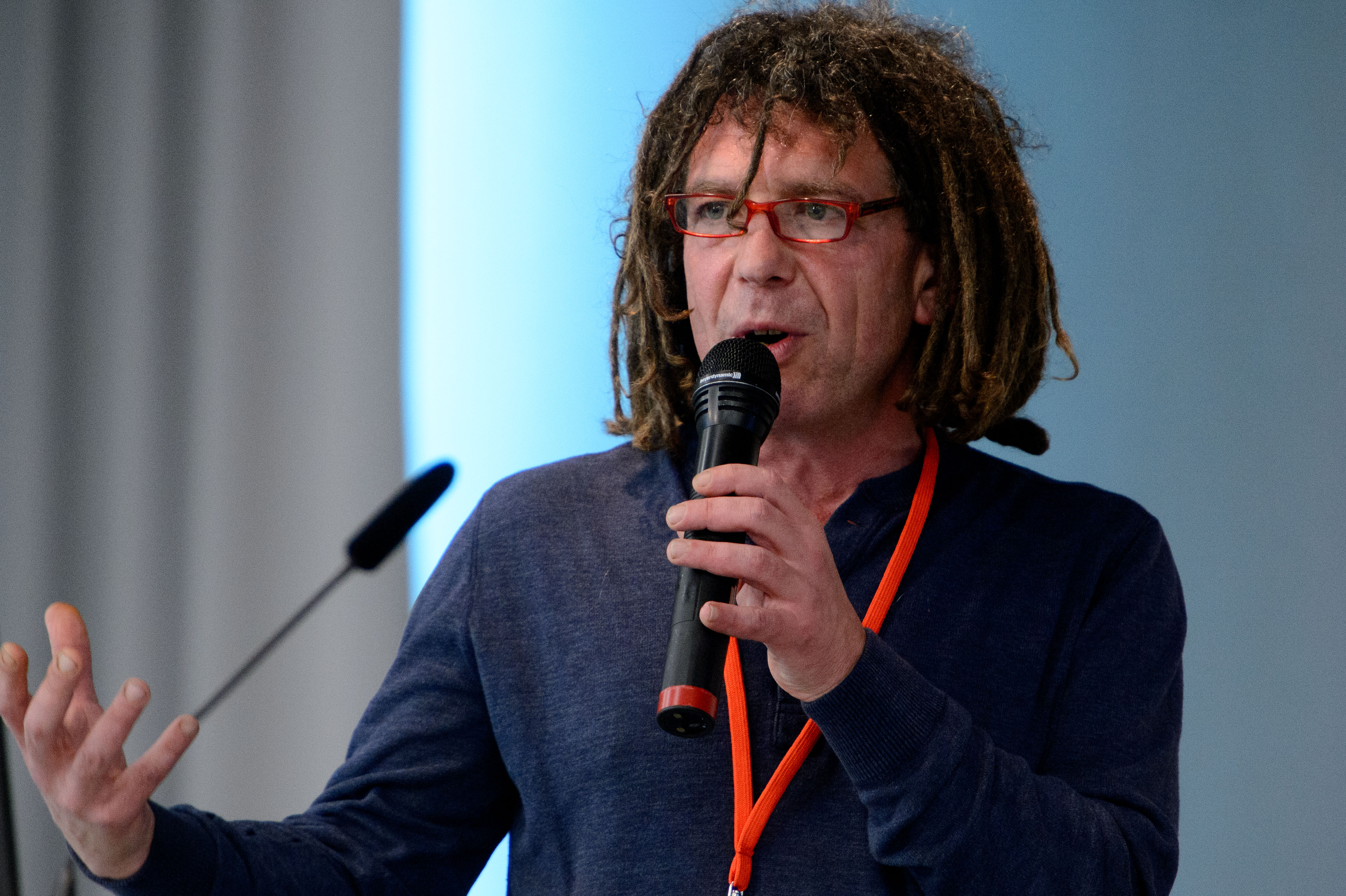
- David Goldblatt in 2014
- Born: David Steven Goldblatt; 26 September 1965 (age 61); London, England
- Occupation: University lecturer
- Known for: Sports journalism

David Goldblatt (born 26 September 1965, London) is a British sports writer, broadcaster, sociologist, journalist and author. Among his books are The Games: A Global History of the Olympics, The Game of Our Lives: The Meaning and Making of English Football, Futebol Nation: A Footballing History of Brazil, and The Ball Is Round: A Global History of Football (described as the "seminal football history" by Simon Kuper).

Goldblatt worked for the Open University (OU), in the Faculty of Social Sciences, between 1992 and 2002. He chaired the foundation course in Social Science. He later wrote a module on global sport for the OU. He has also taught sociology of sport at the University of Bristol and Pitzer College. He was initially a medical student but later studied for a sociology degree.

In 2010, he produced an audio documentary for the BBC entitled The Power and the Passion.

Goldblatt has written for the Guardian, the Observer, The Times Literary Supplement, the Financial Times and The Independent on Sunday, as well as magazines New Statesman, New Left Review and Prospect. Recently he has been a contributor to Howler as well as a guest for the magazine's podcast outlet, "Dummy".

He is a supporter of Tottenham Hotspur and Bristol Rovers.

== Bibliography ==
- The Games: A Global History of the Olympics. W. W. Norton & Company, 2016. (ISBN 978-0-393-29277-0)
- The Ball is Round: A Global History of Football. Viking, 2006. (ISBN 978-1594482960)
- The Football Book. Dorling KIndersley, 2010.(ISBN 978-1405360586)
- The Game of Our Lives. Viking, 2014. (ISBN 978-0241955260)
- Futebol Nation: The Story of Brazil through Soccer. Penguin, 2014. (ISBN 978-1568584676)
- The Age of Football: The Global Game in the Twenty-First Century. W. W. Norton & Company, 2020. (ISBN 978-1509854264)
- Injury Time: Football in a State of Emergency. Mudlark, 2025.(ISBN 978-0008697419)
