= Broken Dreams: Vanity, Greed and the Souring of British Football =

2003 book by Tom Bower

- The cover of the hardback edition
- Author: Tom Bower
- Language: English
- Publisher: Simon & Schuster
- Publication date: 2003
- Publication place: United Kingdom
- Media type: Various
- Pages: 304 (hardcover); 399 (softcover)
- ISBN: 978-0-743-22079-8 (hardcover); ISBN 978-1-847-39003-5 (softcover)

Broken Dreams: Vanity, Greed and the Souring of British Football is a 2003 non-fiction book by the British biographer and investigative journalist Tom Bower about business dealings in English association football. The book was well received critically and was the recipient of the William Hill Sports Book of the Year for 2003.

== Content ==
The book is divided into 13 chapters with an introduction, and football personalities focused on in the book include Terry Venables, Ken Bates, Harry Redknapp, Dennis Roach, and David Dein. The book opens with the story of Graham Bean, who was appointed the Football Association's 'compliance officer' and also discusses the attempts of Alastair Campbell and Tony Blair to reform football with their Football Task Force. Television rights and transfer dealings in English football are also discussed.

== Reception ==
The expectations for Broken Dreams were high, and according to The Times it was felt that Bower's revelations might lead to resignations, dismissals and possibly arrests. Though the book reportedly left people in football 'underwhelmed', the book was regarded by The Times as having 'laid bare to an unsuspecting public the scale of the venality and profligacy of some managers, the incompetence and lack of financial probity of some chairmen and administrators and the greed of agents'.

Broken Dreams was positively reviewed in The Guardian by the writer and critic Anthony Holden. Holden wrote that "All fans should read this expose of football's financial secrets," describing the book as "dense but devastating." Holden described Bower as having "done football an important service by exposing its unseemly underbelly". Reviewing the book for The Times, Daniel Finkelstein said that it was a "...devastating book, an indictment of football that all fans should read and understand...No one who reads Broken Dreams can end it in any doubt that the practices it details are widespread" Ros Leckie, reviewing the paperback edition for The Times said that "In minute and mounting detail it chronicles the avarice and megalomania that characterise our species at its worst".

Broken Dreams was positively reviewed in The Telegraph by both Russell Davies and John Lanchester. Lanchester wrote that "It would not be true to say that our libel laws were designed to prevent journalists from telling the truth; but that is how they often function in practice, and Bower has performed an astonishing job of investigation...The result is a remorseless book...But it is more the result of the desperately depressing world it evokes, one that seems at times to be unrelieved by competence or straightforwardness. ...What this adds up to is an indictment of the entire culture of British football...British football is greedy, incompetently administered, and mindlessly in thrall to the cult of celebrity. Those charges are all true. The harder question is whether contemporary Britain has the national game it deserves." Lanchester was critical of Bower's prose, and wrote that it "veers between the ugly-functional and the quasi-literate."

In a review for When Saturday Comes, Harry Pearson wrote that "...It would be nice to think that a few years from now something will occur to vindicate Tom Bower. His book about the shady finances of our national game...has certainly been greeted by football with a rare and intense silence." Bower was praised by Pearson for his writing in "great clarity and concision about murky business dealings" but Pearson also felt that "Broken Dreams does not make happy reading. It conjures up a world in which greed, arrogance, stupidity, egomania and profligacy meet with stunning force." In The Observer, Will Hutton wrote that "...even allowing for author Tom Bower's predilections for unrelievedly seeing the worst of human nature, his recent book on football, Broken Dreams, is a tour de force. The cumulative impact of the evidence he assembles is devastating".

A more critical review of Broken Dreams was written by Martin Samuel in The Times who wrote "Is there corruption in football? I don't doubt it. But it will need a better book than this to uncover it". Samuel was also critical of Bower's characterization of Terry Venables's accent and Bower's positive depiction of David Mellor. Samuel also felt that many of the revelations were already well documented.

The book appeared on the Sunday Times bestseller list in February 2003.

Broken Dreams was the winner of the William Hill Sports Book of the Year for 2003; Bower received a cheque for £15,000 and a free bet. The journalist Danny Kelly, a judge of that year's award said that Broken Dreams was a "powerful weapon" in "the battle for the moral high ground of football".

== Bibliography ==
- Bower, Tom (2003). Broken Dreams: Vanity, Greed and the Souring of British Football (first ed.). London: Simon & Schuster. ISBN 9780743220798.
