= James Piotr Montague =

British writer (born 1979)

James Montague
- Born: Chelmsford, Essex, United Kingdom
- Education: Exeter University
- Occupations: Author, writer
- Writing career
- Notable works: When Friday Comes, Thirty One Nil, The Billionaires Club, 1312: Among the Ultras, Engulfed: How Saudi Arabia Bought Sport and the World
- Notable awards: Best New Writer (2009), Football Book of the Year (2015, 2018); British Sports Book Awards

James Montague (born 28 July 1979) is a British writer.

After studying Politics at Exeter University, Montague discovered a love for writing. His first book, When Friday Comes: Football in the War Zone (Mainstream), follows his travels across the Middle East, visiting some of the most difficult countries in that area and looking at the relationship between football and politics. The book won him the Best New Writer Award at the 2009 British Sports Book Awards, run by the National Sporting Club. A heavily revised second edition, When Friday Comes: Football, War & Revolution in the Middle East was published in May 2013. A third edition, When Friday Comes: Football Revolution in the Middle East and the Road to Qatar was published by Penguin in 2022.

His second book, Thirty One Nil: On The Road With Football's Outsiders, a World Cup Odyssey, was published by Bloomsbury in May 2014. The book was named Football Book of the Year at the 2015 British Sports Book of the Year Awards.

Montague's third book, The Billionaires Club: The Unstoppable Rise of Football's Super-Rich Owners (Bloomsbury), was published in August 2017. And his fourth, 1312: Among the Ultras, A Journey With the World’s Most Extreme Fans, was published in March 2020.

He has reported extensively for the New York Times, CNN, Tifo and the BBC World Service, amongst others, and is a founding editor of the world's first slow journalism magazine Delayed Gratification.
