= Conrad and Lady Black: Dancing on the Edge =

2006 biography of Conrad and Barbara Black by Tom Bower

- The cover of the hardback first edition
- Author: Tom Bower
- Language: English
- Publisher: Harper Perennial
- Publication date: 2006
- Publication place: United Kingdom
- Pages: 448 (hardcover); 515 (softcover)
- ISBN: 978-0-007-23234-5 (hardcover); ISBN 978-0-007-24716-5 (softcover)

Conrad and Lady Black: Dancing on the Edge (published as Outrageous Fortune: The Rise and Ruin of Conrad and Lady Black in the United States) is a 2006 biography of the Canadian businessman and author Conrad Black and his wife, the British born Canadian journalist Barbara Amiel, by the British journalist and biographer Tom Bower.

== Description ==
The book details Black's personal biography and an account of his business career and marriage to Barbara Amiel and their lifestyle. In the acknowledgements section of the book Bower thanks Black's three previous biographers, Peter C. Newman, Richard Skilos, and Jackie McNish for their previous works on Black, and the 200 people that he interviewed while writing the book. Bower declined Black's offer to cooperate with the book, which was apparently offered on the basis that the book would not be published until after Black's criminal trial for fraud and obstruction of justice. (Note: "At one stage Conrad Black offered to cooperate, on the condition, it seemed, that the book not be published until after his trial. I did not accept the offer. Barbara Amiel did not reply to my letter".^{2006}) The book consists of 14 chapters, with a preface and introduction. An updated edition of the book was issued in paperback to include coverage of the trial.

== Reception ==
The biography received largely enthusiastic reviews, with reviewers highlighting Tom Bower's research and the Blacks' lifestyle. Criticism was reserved for Bower's prose style.

Writing in the New Statesman, Cristina Odone said that

Greed, conspicuous consumption and a selfishness beyond parody: this is capitalism red in tooth and claw. It is also a compulsive yarn. But then, could it be otherwise when the protagonists are so outrageously over-the-top, so unfettered by convention – and so wickedly appealing?

Referring to his then upcoming trial for fraud, Odone says that

Bower has ensured that we need not wait until then to hear the evidence against Lord Black. With painstaking care, he assembles facts, insights and anecdotes. Even if Lord Black walks free from the courtroom, Bower's chronicle, like the narrator's prison diary in Kind Hearts and Coronets, will have sealed his fate.

Peter Preston gave a more critical review of the book for The Observer, writing:

Against all odds, you begin to feel a twinge of sympathy for [Black] ...It is three years since his world collapsed, yet his day in court still lies far away...now along comes grim literary reaper Tom Bower, preparing another of his killer investigations. Will Conrad co-operate? Tom asks innocently. No fear! says Lord B; I know you're writing the story of 'two sleazy, spivvy, contemptible people who enjoyed fraudulent and unjust elevation'. Well, he certainly got the plot right. Our difficulty is knowing when the plot quite fits the story.

Preston wrote that Bower's work was a "masterly performance" adding that

The premier bloodhound of British journalism has done his standard post-Rowland, post-Maxwell job: 150 interviews, 434 pages, a formidable array of facts and fiddles. The bewildering business of 'non-compete fees' and loans from one dodgy shell company to another has never seemed clearer.

Preston also speculated whether Black's co-defendant David Radler was a source for the book but concluded by saying that the book was "personality painting by numbers. Maybe that doesn't matter. Maybe the incisive exposure of 'crooked charlatans' (Black's phrase) is enough. But if you want understanding as well as facts, you'll just possibly end up asking for more." Another more critical review came from Janet Maslin in the International Herald Tribune who wrote that the book was a "hastily disgorged, shapeless account of Black's apparent shell-game approach to corporate management and surreptitious fee extraction" and that it was "convoluted but sketchy" as a business book. Maslin wrote that "Bower favors generalities and neglects to cite sources for much of the material here. The blanket claim that he has drawn on earlier biographical and autobiographical books about Black does not justify such oversights" but added that

the book's assertion that in the year 2000 alone Black associates extracted $122 million from a company with a net income of $117 million is supported by investigatory evidence uncovered by a hard-charging analyst from the investment fund Tweedy Browne. And its implications regarding the Blacks' cupidity are nothing if not clear.

Maslin was critical of Bower's prose, writing that his "insights into human nature are primitive. His phrasing is unfortunate. And his editor is missing in action. Think what you will of Black, but he writes better than his biographer does". John Lanchester reviewed the book in the London Review of Books and described Black as

the only tycoon with a wholly distinctive prose style. It is on show in a furious email Black wrote to Tom Bower, protesting that Bower's forthcoming book about Lord and Lady Black was going to be 'a heartwarming story of two sleazy, spivvy, contemptible people, who enjoyed a fraudulent and unjust elevation; were exposed, and ground to powder in a just system, have been ostracised; and largely impoverished, and that I am on my way to the prison cell where I belong.' One can quibble with the punctuation, but as a summary of Conrad and Lady Black: Dancing on the Edge, that paraphrase is accurate to the point of clairvoyance.

Though Lanchester wrote that "the purity of Bower's Schadenfreude is off-putting" and that Bower "never lets up in hostility for a moment" he says that

it does leave the reader feeling like a witness at an execution. ...Neither he nor Amiel was a tiny bit shy about showing people they didn't think they mattered. The widespread Schadenfreude – it's not just Bower – is fully explicable, though it's no more attractive for that.

Ivan Fallon, writing in The Independent, wrote that Bower, "...absorbed in the detail of the tale, which he sets out superbly, never fully explains the suddenness and scale of the downfall. ...Somewhere deep in Black's psyche there is a fatal flaw that caused him to self-destruct, just when he had everything." Fallon also wrote that Amiel "...emerges as the real subject of the book, easily outshining her pompous and verbose husband." The book was also reviewed by Kim Fletcher in The Telegraph. In a review for The Economist, the book was described as a "gripping cautionary tale that still awaits its denouement".

== Aftermath ==
In February 2007, Black filed a libel suit in Toronto against Bower over the contents of the book and sought $11 million in damages. Black described Bower as "vindictive, high-handed, contemptuous, sadistic" and "pathologically mendacious" in the suit and claimed that he had been portrayed as "incorrigibly and notoriously corrupt and dishonest, psychiatrically maladjusted, devoid of any redeeming or mitigating qualities". Black also claimed that the biography described Amiel as "grasping, hectoring, slatternly, extravagant, shrill and a harridan". Black's suit said that Bower had falsely described him as "a religious hypocrite or crank who delusionally imagines conversations with God in which he believes he receives reassurances about the divine acceptability of illegal and immoral actions"; this was one of more than 50 alleged inaccuracies and defamatory statements that Black claimed appeared in the book.

In response, Bower claimed that he was not worried about the suit, saying that "Robert Maxwell sued me many times and look what happened to him". The suit was frozen when Black was convicted of fraud and imprisoned. At the time of Black's release from prison in 2012, the case was described as a "$2.5-million suit" and Bower said, "How can a convicted fraudster find a jury who will say that his reputation has been damaged by a book that says he's a fraudster?"

A passing reference in the book to the British businessman, pornographer, and publisher Richard Desmond led to Desmond unsuccessfully suing Bower for libel in 2009. Desmond argued that the description in the book that he was "ground into the dust" when he had published an apology after Black had threatened to sue for libel had weakened his reputation.
