= Ronald Reng =

German sports journalist and author (born 1970)

- Born: 1970 (age 55–56); Frankfurt, West Germany
- Occupation: Sports journalist
- Writing career
- Genre: Sports
- Notable work: A Life too Short: The Tragedy of Robert Enke

Ronald Reng is a German sports journalist and author. A number of his books have been translated into English, including The Keeper of Dreams, A Life too Short: The Tragedy of Robert Enke, and Matchdays: The Hidden Story of the Bundesliga. The story of the German goalkeeper Lars Leese, who played for Barnsley Football Club in the Premier League, The Keeper of Dreams won the Sports Book of the Year Award in 2004, the first foreign book to win. His biography of the late German national goalkeeper Robert Enke, A Life too Short: The Tragedy of Robert Enke, was voted William Hill Sports Book of the Year in 2011, with Reng was the first non-English speaking author in 23 years to win the award.

In Germany, Reng won the award for the best sports story of the year by the Association of German Sports Writers seven times between 2001 and 2010. In 2010 he was awarded the Dietrich Oppenberg Media Award "for outstanding journalistic contributions to promote the culture of reading." A Life too Short was also named Sports Book of the Year 2015 at the Polish Sports Book Awards (Sportowa Książka Roku).

== Works ==
- The Keeper of Dreams. One man's controversial story of life in the Premier League, 2002
- Mein Leben als Engländer, 2003
- Gebrauchsanweisung für London, 2004
- Fremdgänger, 2005
- Weltmeister, 2006
- The funny German, 2010
- A Life Too Short: The Tragedy of Robert Enke, 2010
- Matchdays: The Hidden Story of the Bundesliga, 2015
