= William Hill Sports Book of the Year =

Annual British sports literary award

- Sponsored by: William Hill
- Country: United Kingdom
- Hosted by: William Hill
- Reward: £30,000
- First award: 1989
- Website: https://news.williamhill.com/sport/sports-book-of-the-year/

The William Hill Sports Book of the Year is an annual British sports writing award sponsored by bookmaker William Hill. It was first presented in 1989, and was conceived by Graham Sharpe of William Hill, and John Gaustad, founder of the Sports Pages bookshop. As of 2020, the remuneration is £30,000, and a leather-bound copy of their book. Each of the shortlisted authors receives £3,000.

Commenting on the prize, the 2005 winner Gary Imlach said "although it is a sports book prize, it has the prestige and the commercial clout to lift the winning book out of the sport section".

As of 2020, the judging panel is chaired by Alyson Rudd and includes retired professional footballer and former chairman of the Professional Footballer's Association, Clarke Carlisle; five-time Olympic medallist and rower Dame Katherine Grainger; broadcaster and writer John Inverdale; broadcaster Danny Kelly and journalist and broadcaster Mark Lawson.

== History ==
Paul Kimmage was the first author to win both the Irish (2011) and International awards (1990).

In 2010, Duncan Hamilton, a winner twice in the previous three years, was again included in the shortlist, although on this occasion, when the award was announced on 30 November in London, the prize was won by Brian Moore, the former England rugby union international, for his autobiography, Beware of the Dog.

In 2011, there was a "surprise inclusion" to the shortlist of Engage: The Fall and Rise of Matt Hampson, a biography of quadriplegic Matt Hampson, by 1990 winner Paul Kimmage, despite it not being included on the longlist. The shortlist also included a book on bullfighting, Into The Arena: The World of the Spanish Bullfight by Alexander Fiske-Harrison, despite journalists including Fiske-Harrison himself arguing that bullfighting was not a sport, leading to the employment of security for the first time at the ceremony at Waterstones of Piccadilly. In the end the prize went to A Life Too Short: The Tragedy of Robert Enke, about Robert Enke who committed suicide, by Ronald Reng.

Duncan Hamilton is the only author to have won the award three times, first in 2007, second in 2009 and most recently in 2019. Boxing author Donald McRae has twice won the award, in 1996 and 2002.

Lauren Fleshman's book Good for a Girl became in 2023 the first book written by a woman and about women's sports to win.

== Winners ==
Winners of the William Hill Sports Book of the Year
Year	Title	Author(s)	Featured subject(s)	Featured sport	Ref(s)
1989	True Blue: The Oxford Boat Race Mutiny	Dan Topolski, Patrick Robinson	The Boat Race	Rowing	
1990	Rough Ride: An Insight into Pro Cycling	Paul Kimmage	Paul Kimmage	Cycling	
1991	Muhammad Ali: His Life and Times	Thomas Hauser	Muhammad Ali	Boxing	
1992	Fever Pitch: A Fan's Life	Nick Hornby	Nick Hornby	Football	
1993	Endless Winter: The Inside Story of the Rugby Revolution	Stephen Jones	Rugby union	Rugby union	
1994	Football Against the Enemy	Simon Kuper	Football	Football	
1995	A Good Walk Spoiled: Days and Nights on the PGA Tour	John Feinstein	PGA Tour	Golf	
1996	Dark Trade: Lost in Boxing	Donald McRae	Boxing	Boxing	
1997	A Lot of Hard Yakka: Cricketing Life on the County Circuit	Simon Hughes	Simon Hughes	Cricket	
1998	Angry White Pyjamas: An Oxford Poet Trains with the Tokyo Riot Police	Robert Twigger	Robert Twigger	Aikido	
1999	A Social History of English Cricket	Derek Birley	Cricket	Cricket	
2000	It's Not About the Bike: My Journey Back to Life	Lance Armstrong, Sally Jenkins	Lance Armstrong	Cycling	
2001	Seabiscuit: The True Story of Three Men and a Racehorse	Laura Hillenbrand	Seabiscuit	Horse racing	
2002	In Black and White: The Untold Story of Joe Louis and Jesse Owens	Donald McRae	Joe Louis, Jesse Owens	Athletics, Boxing	
2003	Broken Dreams: Vanity, Greed and the Souring of British Football	Tom Bower	Football	Football	
2004	Basil D'Oliveira: Cricket and Conspiracy: the Untold Story	Peter Oborne	Basil D'Oliveira	Cricket	
2005	My Father & Other Working Class Football Heroes	Gary Imlach	Stewart Imlach	Football	
2006	Unforgivable Blackness: The Rise and Fall of Jack Johnson	Geoffrey Ward	Jack Johnson	Boxing	
2007	Provided You Don't Kiss Me: 20 Years With Brian Clough	Duncan Hamilton	Brian Clough	Football	
2008	Coming Back to Me: The Autobiography of Marcus Trescothick	Marcus Trescothick, Peter Hayter	Marcus Trescothick	Cricket	
2009	Harold Larwood	Duncan Hamilton	Harold Larwood	Cricket	
2010	Beware of the Dog: Rugby's Hard Man Reveals All	Brian Moore	Brian Moore	Rugby union	
2011	A Life Too Short: The Tragedy of Robert Enke	Ronald Reng	Robert Enke	Football	
2012	The Secret Race: Inside the Hidden World of the Tour de France: Doping, Cover-ups, and Winning at All Costs	Tyler Hamilton, Daniel Coyle	Tyler Hamilton, Lance Armstrong	Cycling	
2013	Doped: The Real Life Story of the 1960s Racehorse Doping Gang	Jamie Reid	William Roper, Micheline Lugeon	Horse racing	
2014	Night Games: Sex, Power and a Journey Into the Dark Heart of Sport	Anna Krien	"Justin Dyer"	Australian rules football	
2015	The Game of Our Lives: The Meaning and Making of English Football	David Goldblatt	Football	Football	
2016	Barbarian Days: A Surfing Life	William Finnegan	William Finnegan	Surfing	
2017	Tom Simpson: Bird on the Wire	Andy McGrath	Tom Simpson	Cycling	
2018	A Boy in The Water [joint winner]	Tom Gregory	Tom Gregory	Long-distance swimming	
2018	The Lost Soul of Eamonn Magee [joint winner]	Paul D. Gibson	Eamonn Magee	Boxing	
2019	The Great Romantic: Cricket and the Golden Age of Neville Cardus	Duncan Hamilton	Neville Cardus	Cricket	
2020	The Rodchenkov Affair: How I Brought Down Russia's Secret Doping Empire	Grigory Rodchenkov	Doping in Russia	Olympic Games	
2021	Why We Kneel, How We Rise	Michael Holding	Black Lives Matter	Athletics, cricket, etc.	
2022	Beryl: In Search of Britain's Greatest Athlete	Jeremy Wilson	Beryl Burton	Cycling	
2023	Good For a Girl	Lauren Fleshman	Lauren Fleshman	Athletics	
2024	The Racket: On Tour with Tennis’s Golden Generation – and the other 99%.	Conor Niland	Conor Niland	Tennis	
2025	The Escape	Pippa York, David Walsh	Pippa York (previously Robert Millar)	Cycling	
