= Březová =

Březová may refer to places in the Czech Republic:

- Březová (Beroun District), a municipality and village in the Central Bohemian Region
- Březová (Karlovy Vary District), a municipality and village in the Karlovy Vary Region
- Březová (Opava District), a market town in the Moravian-Silesian Region
- Březová (Sokolov District), a town in the Karlovy Vary Region
- Březová (Uherské Hradiště District), a municipality and village in the Zlín Region
- Březová (Zlín District), a municipality and village in the Zlín Region
- Březová, a village and part of Březová-Oleško in the Central Bohemian Region
- Březová, a village and part of Meziměstí in the Hradec Králové Region
- Březová, a village and part of Úmonín in the Central Bohemian Region
- Březová, a village and part of Všelibice in the Liberec Region
- Březová nad Svitavou, a town in the Pardubice Region

== See also ==
- Brezova (disambiguation)
