= Brezova =

Brezova may refer to:

- Brezova, Celje, a village in the Municipality of Celje, eastern Slovenia
- Brezova, Croatia, a village near Sveti Križ Začretje
- Brezova, Ivanjica, a village in Serbia
- Brezova, Kraljevo, a village in Serbia
- Březová (Beroun District), a municipality and village in the Central Bohemian Region
- Březová (Karlovy Vary District), a municipality and village in the Karlovy Vary Region
- Březová (Opava District), a market town in the Moravian-Silesian Region
- Březová (Sokolov District), a town in the Karlovy Vary Region
- Březová (Uherské Hradiště District), a municipality and village in the Zlín Region
- Březová (Zlín District), a municipality and village in the Zlín Region
- Březová, a village and part of Březová-Oleško in the Central Bohemian Region
- Březová, a village and part of Meziměstí in the Hradec Králové Region
- Březová, a village and part of Úmonín in the Central Bohemian Region
- Březová, a village and part of Všelibice in the Liberec Region
- Březová nad Svitavou, a town in the Pardubice Region
