= Velký Lopeník =

Coordinates: 48°55′00″N 17°46′57″E

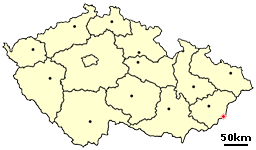
Location of Velký Lopeník in the Czech Republic

Velký Lopeník (-in Czech, Veľký Lopeník in Slovak; Hungarian: Nagy Lopenik) is the second highest mountain in White Carpathians, in the Zlín Region of the Czech Republic, on border with Slovakia. Its elevation is 911 meters.

The area around the mountain, Moravian Kopanice (Moravské kopanice or Kopanice), was hilly region of primitive agriculture and small, scattered farms. Nearest villages are Lopeník, Březová (Czech Republic) and Nová Bošáca (in Slovakia).

Several view-towers has been built on the top of the mountain. The first built in 1944 caught fire in 1946, another one fell down in 1972. During 2004 - 2005 a new, 22 meters high wooden tower has been erected. It was placed directly on the border as a symbol of friendship among Czechs and Slovaks.

Due to insufficient tourist infrastructure the mountain and surrounding area is rather hard to access. However, this shortage makes the place preferred to those who avoid such amenities.
