= Brezovo (disambiguation) =

Brezovo is a town in Southern Bulgaria.

Brezovo may also refer to:

== Bulgaria ==
- Brezovo Municipality, a municipality of Plovdiv Province

== Slovenia ==
- Brezovo, Litija, a village in the Municipality of Litija, central Slovenia
- Brezovo, Sevnica, a village in the Municipality of Sevnica, southeastern Slovenia
- Dolnje Brezovo, a village in the Municipality of Sevnica, southeastern Slovenia
- Gorenje Brezovo, a village in the Municipality of Ivančna Gorica, southeastern Slovenia
- Gornje Brezovo, a village in the Municipality of Sevnica, southeastern Slovenia
- Spodnje Brezovo, a village in the Municipality of Ivančna Gorica, southeastern Slovenia

== See also ==
- Brezova (disambiguation)
