= Měchenice =

- Municipality
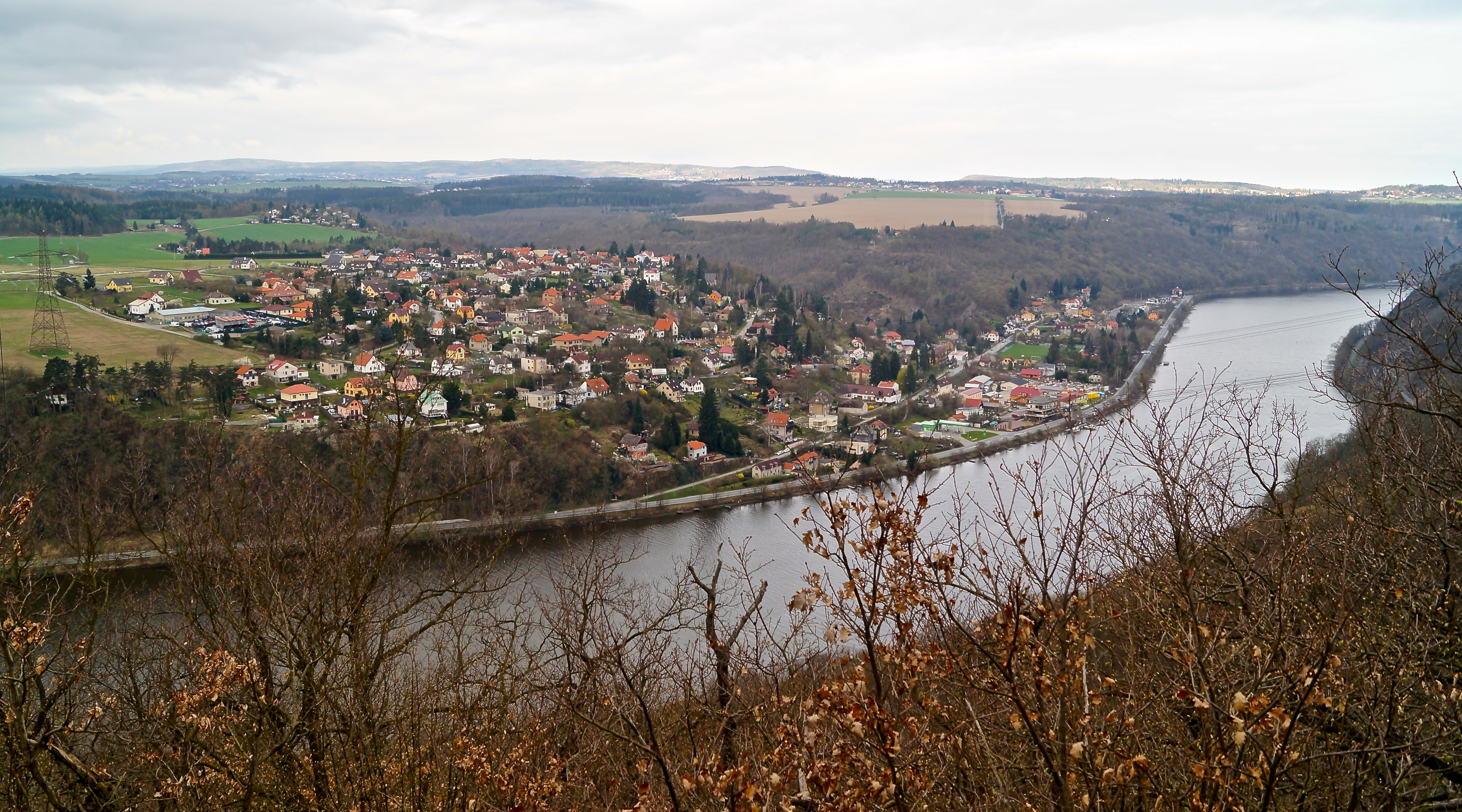
- View of Měchenice from Oleško

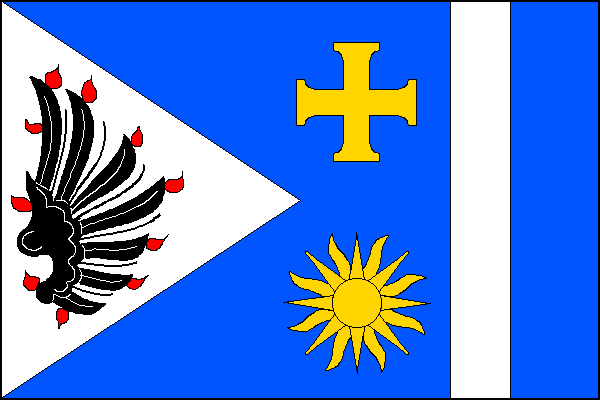
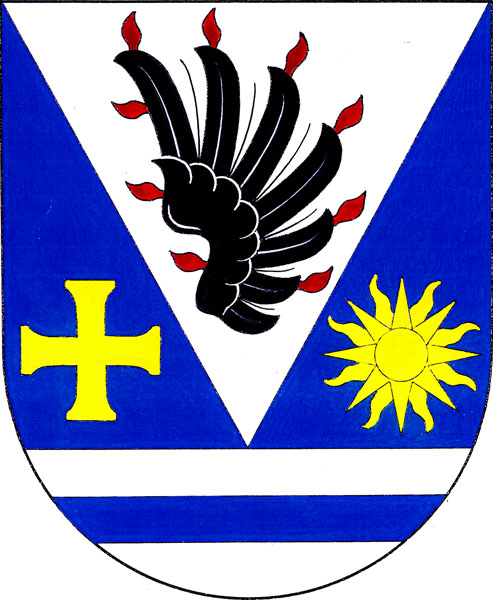
- Flag Coat of arms

- Location in the Czech Republic
- Coordinates: 49°54′30″N 14°23′22″E
- Country: Czech Republic
- Region: Central Bohemian
- District: Prague-West
- First mentioned: 999

Area
  - Total: 1.33 km^{2} (0.51 sq mi)
- Elevation: 205 m (673 ft)

Population (2026-01-01)
  - Total: 875
  - Density: 658/km^{2} (1,700/sq mi)
- Time zone: UTC+1 (CET)
  - Summer (DST): UTC+2 (CEST)
- Postal code: 252 06
- Website: www.obecmechenice.cz

Měchenice is a municipality and village in Prague-West District in the Central Bohemian Region of the Czech Republic. It has about 900 inhabitants.

== Etymology ==
The name was initially written as Měchynice and was derived from the personal name Měchyně. The word mechyně, from which the personal name was derived, denoted 'harlot' in the Middle Ages.

== Geography ==
Měchenice is located about 12 kilometres (7 mi) south of Prague. It lies in the Benešov Uplands. The highest point is at 307 m (1,007 ft) above sea level. The municipality is situated on the left shore of the Vrané Reservoir, built on the Vltava river. The stream Bojovský potok flows through the municipality into the Vltava.

== History ==
Měchenice is one of the oldest settlements in Bohemia. The first written mention of Měchenice is from 999, when Duke Boleslaus II donated the village to the Ostrov Monastery in Davle.

== Demographics ==
Historical population

Year	Pop.	±%
1869	129	—
1880	133	+3.1%
1890	117	−12.0%
1900	146	+24.8%
1910	151	+3.4%

Year	Pop.	±%
1921	173	+14.6%
1930	310	+79.2%
1950	448	+44.5%
1961	678	+51.3%
1970	618	−8.8%

Year	Pop.	±%
1980	599	−3.1%
1991	521	−13.0%
2001	591	+13.4%
2011	809	+36.9%
2021	888	+9.8%

Source: Censuses

== Transport ==
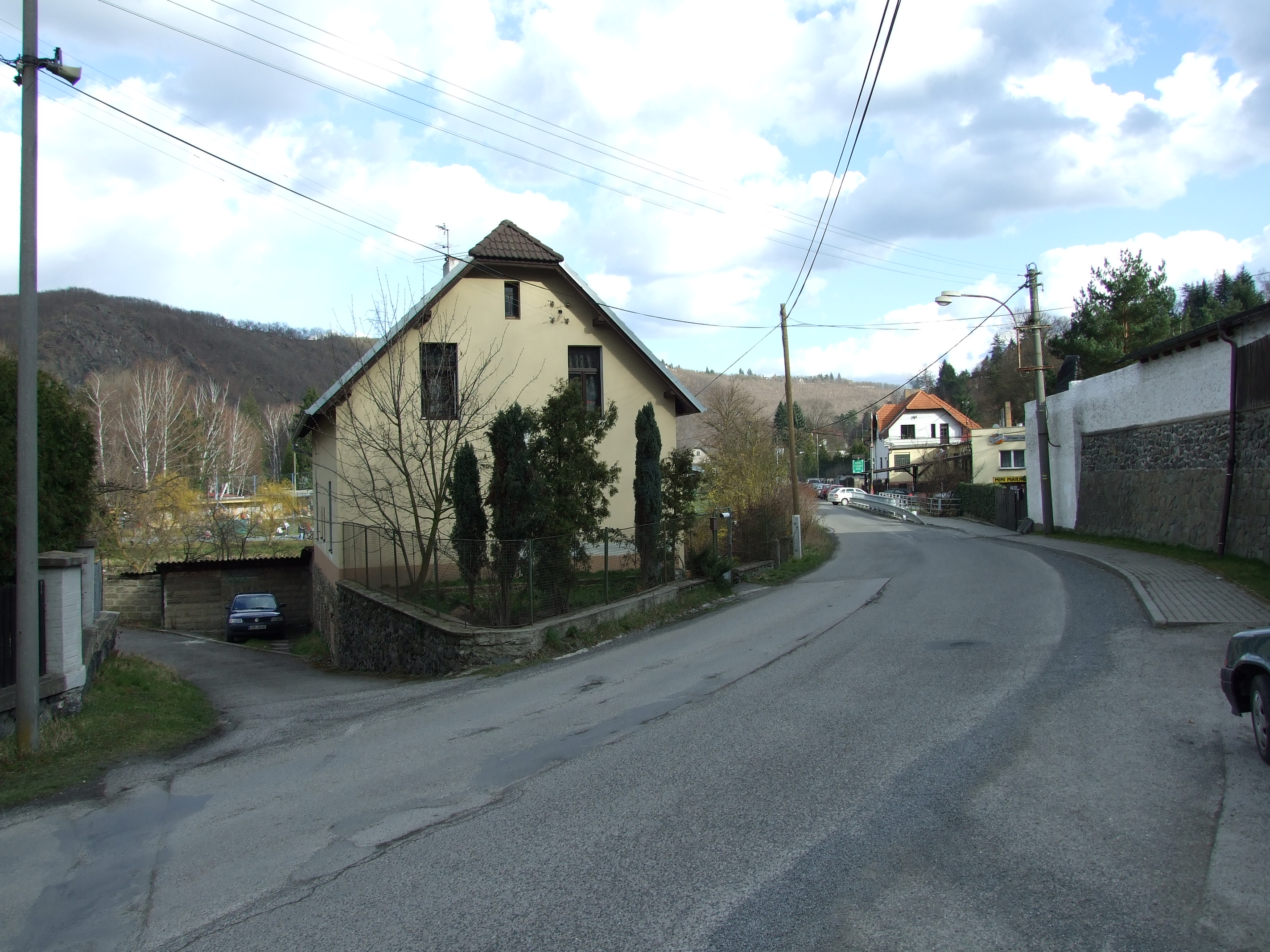
Main street

Měchenice is located on the railway line Prague–Dobříš.

== Sport ==
The football club AFK Měchenice was founded in 1927. Today known as TJ Sokol Měchenice, it plays in lower amateur tiers. The tennis club in Měchenice was founded in 1985.

== Sights ==
There are no protected cultural monuments in the municipality.
