= Slušovice =

- Town
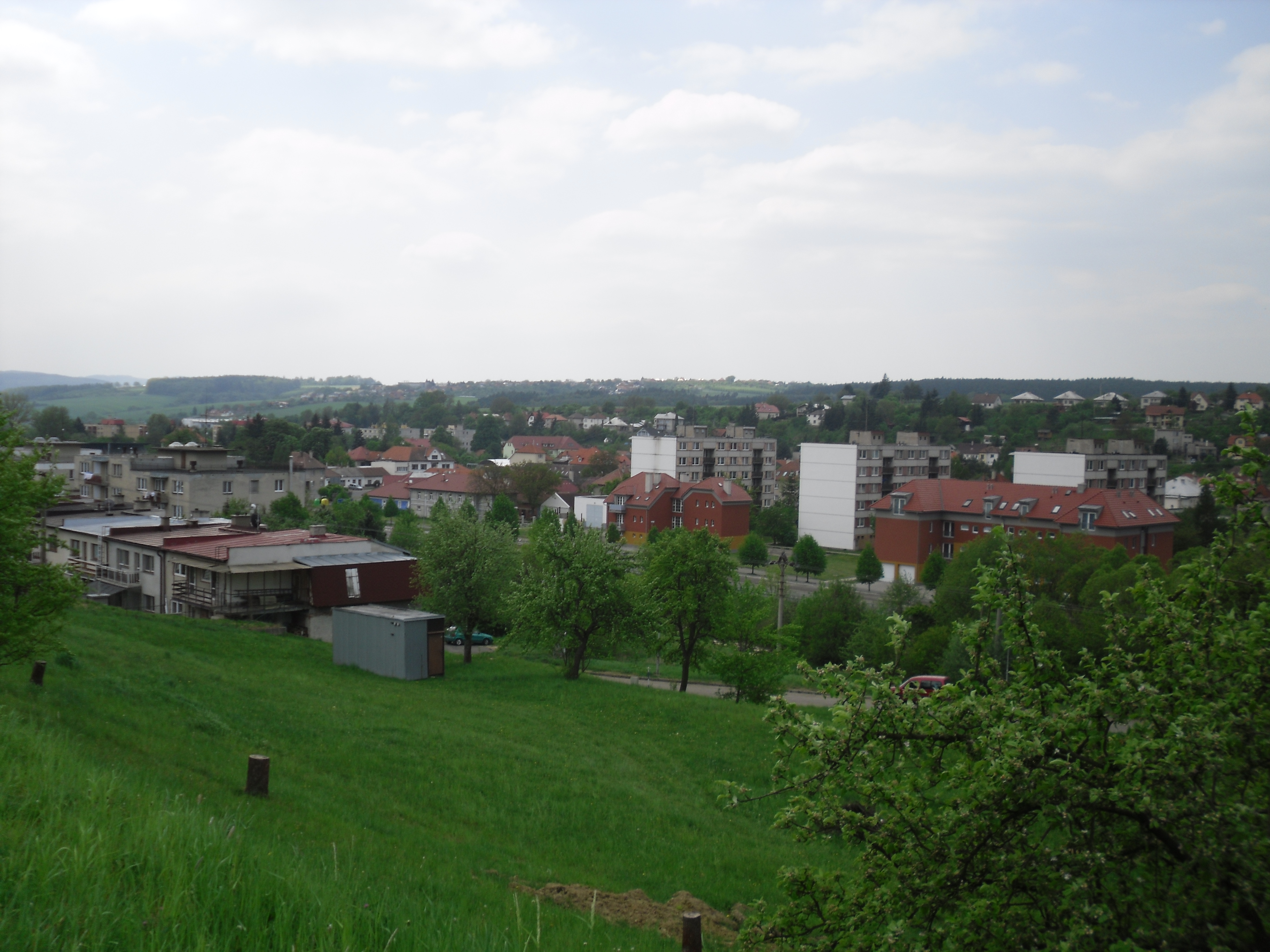
- General view

- Flag Coat of arms

- Location in the Czech Republic
- Coordinates: 49°14′58″N 17°48′3″E
- Country: Czech Republic
- Region: Zlín
- District: Zlín
- First mentioned: 1261

Government
  - Mayor: Petr Hradecký

Area
  - Total: 7.08 km^{2} (2.73 sq mi)
- Elevation: 275 m (902 ft)

Population (2026-01-01)
  - Total: 2,929
  - Density: 414/km^{2} (1,070/sq mi)
- Time zone: UTC+1 (CET)
  - Summer (DST): UTC+2 (CEST)
- Postal code: 763 15
- Website: www.slusovice.eu

Slušovice (Czech pronunciation: [ˈsluʃovɪtsɛ]; German: Sluschowitz) is a town in Zlín District in the Zlín Region of the Czech Republic. It has about 2,900 inhabitants. The town is located on the Dřevnice River in the Vizovice Highlands.

== Geography ==
Slušovice is located about 9 kilometres (6 mi) east of Zlín. It lies in the Vizovice Highlands. The highest point is at 415 m (1,362 ft) above sea level. The town is situated on the Dřevnice River. The Slušovice Reservoir, named after the town, is located outside the municipal territory.

== History ==
The first written mention of Slušovice is from 1261. It obtained town privileges in 1375.

The town was known throughout the former Czechoslovakia for being the site of an unusually successful and productive socialist collective farm JZD Slušovice. With time, technological developments allowed for the manufacture of computers in the town's industrial complex. These computers were sold under the Slušovice brand, priced at 40,000 USD at the official exchange rate or 5,000 USD on the black market. As a result, the town became a showcase of Czechoslovakia's planned economy.

With the fall of communism in the Eastern Bloc, much of the industry in the town fell into decline. In 1996, Slušovice was returned town status.

== Demographics ==
Historical population

Year	Pop.	±%
1869	907	—
1880	955	+5.3%
1890	930	−2.6%
1900	973	+4.6%
1910	1,061	+9.0%

Year	Pop.	±%
1921	1,086	+2.4%
1930	1,091	+0.5%
1950	1,246	+14.2%
1961	1,375	+10.4%
1970	1,369	−0.4%

Year	Pop.	±%
1980	1,902	+38.9%
1991	2,760	+45.1%
2001	2,985	+8.2%
2011	2,924	−2.0%
2021	2,825	−3.4%

Source: Censuses

== Transport ==
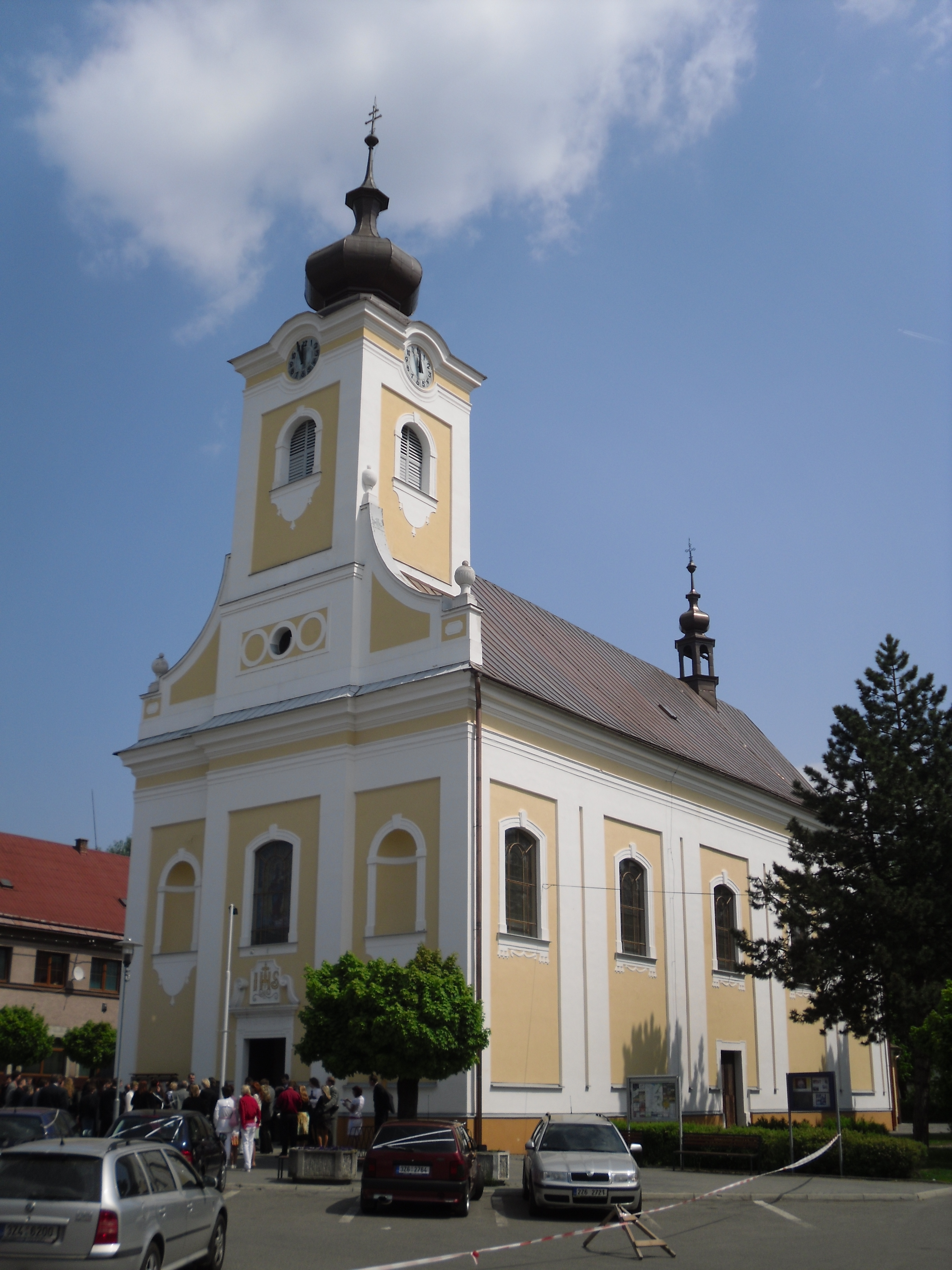
Church of the Nativity of Saint John the Baptist

There are no railways or major roads passing through the municipality.

== Sights ==
The main landmark of Slušovice is the Church of the Nativity of Saint John the Baptist. It was built in 1812–1815.

== Notable people ==
- František Čuba (1936–2019), agronomist and politician; president of JZD Slušovice
