= JZD Slušovice =

Czech cooperative

JZD Slušovice, later renamed Društevní agrokombinát Slušovice and Zemědělské obchodní družstvo FORUM was a unified agricultural cooperative in Slušovice in Czechoslovakia, which became famous for its success as a "socialist miracle". After 1989, the cooperative's assets spilled over into more than 101 companies, most of which went bankrupt. The cooperative itself ended up in liquidation and subsequently in bankruptcy with debts of 5.768 billion CZK.

== History ==
JZD Slušovice was founded in 1952. Since 1963, František Čuba was the head of the team, who gradually led the team to national fame. According to many then and current experts had a major impact on the success of the company led by František Čuba, who introduced work motivational factors (e.g. existential / fear / self-realization / joy at work). According to his words, Čuba had not had a vacation since 1963 and in the same year he announced a fight against alcohol among all cooperative members in Slušovice, which proved to be functional and effective. JZD AK Slušovice also withstood the devastating local summer flash flood in June 1987, which hit the buildings of AK Slušovice very hard. The sales of the cooperative in 1989, when it was at its peak, reached 7 billion crowns, and the profit was almost 830 million. It expanded to the USSR, Vietnam and Egypt and also cooperated with companies in Italy and West Germany.

Slušovice vegetables grown in the Wallachian foothills in greenhouses and hydroponics were famous, corn was grown on a large scale and cattle were raised. Modern agricultural practices and computer technology were introduced. The cooperative had a wide associated production program from biochemistry (preparations for combating insects, which were exported to, for example, Asia, and others), through yogurts, tires and computers, to cows. The cooperative also imported Tuzex-type foreign goods, which it sold in its own Kvatro stores. In the 1980s, neighboring JZDs were incorporated under the JZD AK Slušovice and the same agrarian technologies were applied, especially new crops and chemistry to achieve yields that greatly exceeded the standards of the time. The village of Slušovice itself grew significantly and became rich during the given period. Nationally popular horse races were held here, and the local football team fought its way from the district championship to II. leagues.

In the years 1986–87, a four-lane road connection to the I/49 road was built, which diverted traffic away from the old buildings and the area of the racetrack within Slušovice. JZD Slušovice gradually expanded its activities to many areas, for example its own airline Air Moravia or the construction of test tracks for the West German car manufacturer Audi in Czechoslovakia. He also became famous for an effective care system called the Pensioners' Club, which guaranteed care to everyone who had worked at the company for at least 10 years.

=== The Fall and the Velvet Revolution ===
Čuba describes the period after 1990 as the alleged deliberate liquidation of Slušovice by the new state power, when the result was distrust of customers, reluctance of banks to lend money, etc. He also described this period in an interview for the Slovak magazine Farmář or in February 2010 for the magazine Ekonom.

Since the beginning of 1990, the Civic Forum (OF) JZD DAK Slušovice dealt with complaints about the alleged criminal activity of the management of the cooperative, which, however, was never proven. Allegedly, it was about possible machinations after November 17, 1989 (tunneling through newly established joint-stock companies, masking tax and other frauds, etc.). František Čuba considered these claims to be nonsensical and arose, among other things, from a misunderstanding of the internal functioning of the cooperative, just as he explained the creation of new joint-stock companies as legal on the basis of the then regulations on the transformation of cooperatives. On February 18, 1990, the local OF turned to the chairwoman of the People's Control Committee of the Czech Republic (VLK). The data from the complaints was not enough to start a criminal prosecution, but the VB investigation administration proposed to carry out a review investigation from the level of the VLK and the ministries of agriculture and finance. Subsequently, at the end of June 1990, according to indirect evidence, some documents on JZD's management should have been liquidated, and at the same time, the safe of the joint-stock company MORAGRO was robbed, from which, in addition to money, documents on the establishment and management of this company were stolen. This liquidation and theft was never clarified, during the investigation only the whistleblowers were invited for interviews, not the suspects.

In the period from the autumn of 1989 to the summer of 1991, 101 joint-stock companies were founded, into which the assets of the former cooperative were transferred. Čuba himself allowed the creation of 42 companies. The first as, Ekotrans Moravia, was against the will of the communist regime founded on the basis of the Austro-Hungarian Law on Joint Stock Companies already on June 29, 1989 (entered in the company register on August 2). In addition to Slušovice, its shareholders were 64 other state-owned enterprises, including the Třinec and Vítkovice ironworks and the shoemaker Svit. The company's goal was to build the Danube-Odra-Labe water corridor . Among the largest and most problematic joint stock companies was Moragro, founded on December 17, 1989 (incorporated on January 8, 1990).

In 1990, the cooperative was renamed to Družstevní agrokombinát Slušovice, and in 1993 to Zemědělské obchodní družstvo FORUM. In 1997 the cooperative went into liquidation, in 1999 the cooperative's assets were declared bankrupt. Creditors reported claims in the amount of CZK 5.768 billion, while the largest creditor was the Zlín financial office with CZK 5.6 billion. The bankruptcy was lifted in 2011 after meeting the schedule resolution, when creditors were satisfied at 0.018%.

== TNS Computer Manufacturing ==
Computers of the TNS series ( abbreviation for "Our System") were produced by JZD Slušovice between 1982 and 1989. TNS computers had their origin in the form of an improved design of the ZVT SPU-800 microcomputer created in Transport Construction Olomouc, which replaced the original TP8 processor by a Zilog Z80 compatible processor. The ZVT SPU-800 peripheral cards could also be used in 8-bit TNS systems after minor modifications. Originally, the TNS computer was intended for agrarian fields, where there was no similar Czechoslovak alternative. It was later planned to be used to teach programming in schools, where the Tesla company's Ondra School and Home Computer was to be used . Several school programming classrooms were equipped with TNS computers, for example at the Nicolaus Copernicus Mathematical Gymnasium, but no more massive deployments took place. The Ondra computer was used by several Homes of Pioneers and Youth within their computer technology circles.

Computer models of two series were produced – 8-bit computers of the TNS/Agrosystem series and 16-bit computers of the TNS HC-16/XT/AT series. The "real" Slušovice computers are 8-bit (with a U880D processor, a Zilog Z80 clone ), and only the HC-16 model was 16-bit.

=== TNS series computers ===
TNS ST (c. 1982) - It contained two diskette drives and a keyboard in a wider black case, built into a table from Zbrojovka Brno (tables for Consul 2713). It housed an alphanumeric terminal with a mosaic printer . The ST model used a module to connect 1 to 2 eight-inch single-sided drives with a single recording density.

TNS SC (c. 1985) - The first model to be housed in the TNS SL-64 cartridge. It had an integrated power supply, an expansion bus to which functional cards were connected. The memory of this computer was 64 KB of RAM . It consisted of two large white metal boxes. One of them was larger and contained two 8″ diskette drives, the other narrower box contained cards. Furthermore, the model included a monitor (a modified Tesla Merkur) and a keyboard.

TNS GC and TNS GC/W (1987) - This was an improved model of the SC version that was put into the TNS SL-256 cartridge. Compared to the SC model, it allowed color output to the monitor and had a larger memory of 256 KB RAM. In addition, the GC/W model included a Winchester ( HDD ) in a floppy disk cartridge .

TNS TC (c. 1988), also "Technology Computer". Served as a control element in various environments to manage technological procedures and processes. It contained 64 kB of operational RAM and programmed fixed memory of the EPROM type in the range from 1 to 32 kB and an integrated BASIC interpreter. In appearance, it is based on the Agrosystem series.

TNS MC and TNS MC/W (1989) - This was the last type of 8-bit computer in the TNS series. The RAM memory was up to 960 KB and the hard SCSI disk controller, built on MH3212 circuits. It allowed to connect up to 12 expansion modules. Two 5.25″ diskette drives and a Winchester with a capacity of 20 or 40 MB were integrated in the additional cabinet. The source used was of Polish production.

=== HC series computers ===
TNS HC (1988) - HC (Home Computer) computers generally fell into the professional use category and were designed as part of a budget computer system. It was a compact computer intended for schools. It included an integrated high-quality membrane keyboard with an honored keyboard (the command "enter" read "take"). The HC series was a single-board microcomputer based on the Zilog Z80A processor, operating at 3 MHz with 320 KB of RAM, of which 32 KB was occupied by video RAM . It also functioned as a terminal to SMEP or JSEP computers . The computer was running the TNS-DOS or CP/M operating system . An external source EA1605 was used as power supply, which was connected to the computer with a multi-core shielded cable, terminated with a nine-pin CANON connector.

TNS HC-16 (1989) – It was designed mainly for use in school and business environments. It was based on the TNS HC computer concept in appearance, but was a single-board variant of the IBM-PC XT compatible computer. The main difference was in the processor used. Instead of the 8-bit Z80, a 16-bit Intel 8088 processor was used here . The computer was also equipped with 1 MB of RAM and was supplied with a CGA graphics card (16 colors) located in one of the two ISA bus slots, but these ISA slots did not have a standard back plate (bracket). The keyboard was the same as the previous model, but it was no longer honored. A parallel port, a serial port, a LAN connector, a parallel mouse (TESLA 3WN 166 07) and a 34-pin FDD were brought out in the back . An external EA1605 HC power supply was used as a power supply, which was based on the original EA1605 power supply, but was located in a different case and had a different output connector. The HC-16 computer board was designed to expand the RAM by an additional 256 KB (from Intel P21256 circuits), which could only be used with a special driver. Also, the MM58167 real-time ( RTC ) circuit was not installed on the board, although the I/O address decoders for this circuit were installed. However, it is not known if the RTC supported the installed BIOS .

=== IBM-PC compatible computers ===
They are no longer "real" good computers, like the ones described above. The cooperative imported embargoed components for sixteen-bit computers from abroad, assembled them here, affixed the TNS brand to the box, and then sold them domestically at a high price. For IBM XT/AT computers, the cooperative produced its own cards, e.g. an expansion card for connecting a printer via a parallel port.

TNS XT (circa 1988) - The heart was an Intel 8088 processor with 540 KB of RAM. The graphics card was CGA. The computer case housed the power supply, a 20MB hard drive, and a 5¼" floppy drive for 360KB floppy disks. The computer was running MS-DOS 3.0. In 1990, the computer was sold for 98,000 CZK . A substantial part of the price was the supplied software .

TNS-PC AT 286-12MHz (about 1988) - This was a computer whose heart was an Intel 80286 processor with a frequency of 12 MHz. The computer was equipped with 4x 256 KB RAM memory modules and an EGA graphics card . The hard disk was 40 MB in size. The floppy drive was still 5¼" and could read 360KB floppy disks. It came with a 14″ monitor and MS-DOS 3.0 operating system. The price of this computer was between 200,000 and 300,000 CZK.

TNS-PC AT 386-16 MHz (around the end of 1989) - it was a computer with an Intel 80386 processor with a frequency of 16 MHz with 4x 1 MB RAM modules. It came with a 14″ EGA/ VGA monitor and MS-DOS 4.1 operating system, Norton Commander 4.0 disk manager and T602 text editor . The price of this computer was around 60,000 CZK in 1989, and in 1992 it was allegedly sold for 35,000 CZK .

== In culture ==
Slušovice was inspired by the film Hauři released in cinemas in 1987 (directed by Július Matula, literary work by Stanislav Vácha, later published as a novel Hauři ). Similar to the political scene of the time, the film was ambiguous, admiring the new methods of the fictional modern cooperative, but at the same time criticizing them as an abandonment of tradition and dehumanized technocratism.

In 1988, the journalist Stanislav Vácha published the popular science publication How Slušovice Runs (168 pages). Based on his internships at JZD Slušovice, the author analyzes the organization and internal structure of this company and the mechanism of its activity.

In 1999, director Robert Sedláček filmed the documentary František Čuba: The Slušovick miracle, which retrospectively describes and explains the main factors of the Slušovice company and its post-revolutionary forced disintegration.

The success of Slušovice also left its mark on Czech popular culture, the singer-songwriter duo Miroslav Paleček and Michael Janík wrote a song about Slušovice called Slušovice (it was released on their CD Kukátko and something else ). The song was also heard in the big revue program of Czechoslovak Television from 1988, which was called Jedeme dál ze Slušovice and was filmed at the Parkhotel in Slušovice. Slušovice is also mentioned in the 1989 film Zdeňka A Bit of Sun, Hay and a Few Faces and in the 1986 film "Velká filmová lupež".

From 1979 to 1990, the magazine Naše cesta: zpravodaj JZD Slušovice was published .
