= František Čuba =

Czech politician (1936–2019)

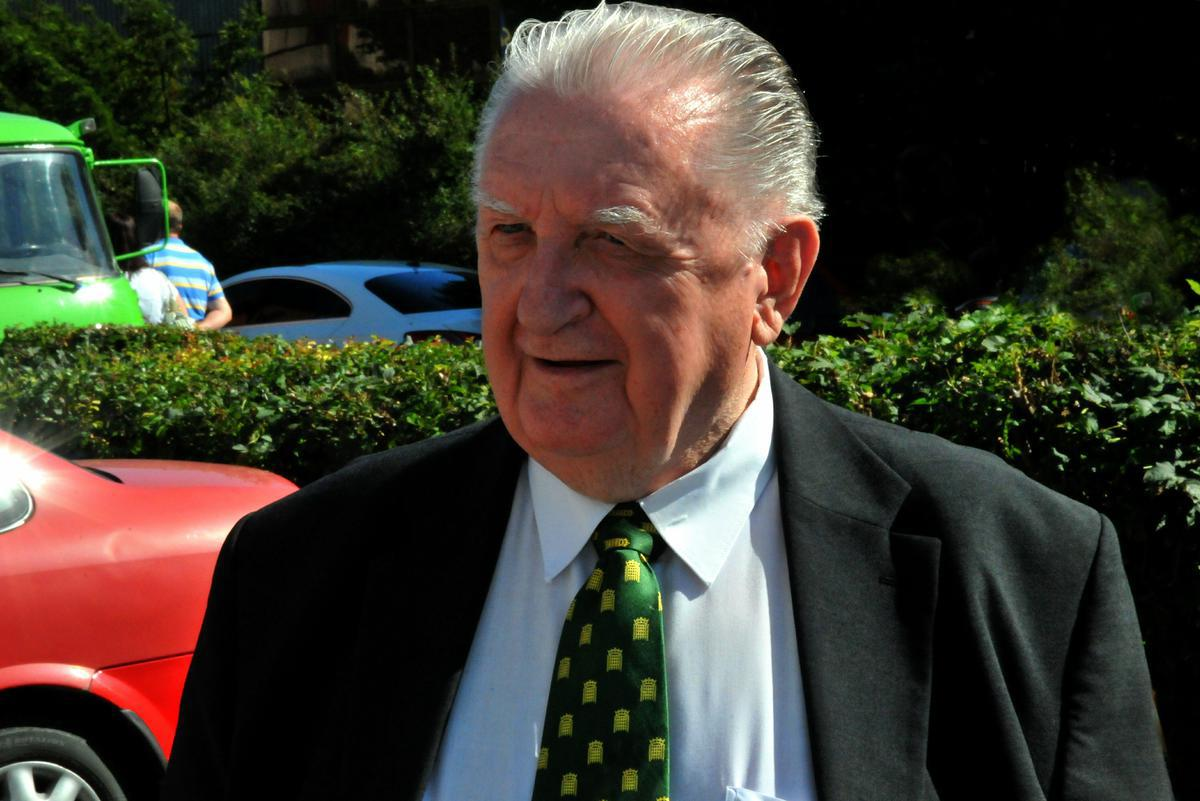

Senator from Zlín
- In office 18 October 2014 – 28 February 2018
- Preceded by: Alena Gajdůšková
- Succeeded by: Tomáš Goláň

Councilor of the Zlín Region
- In office 2012–2016

Advisor to the President of the Czech Republic for Agriculture
- In office 2013–2019

Head of JZD Slušovice
- In office 1963–1990

Personal details
- Born: 23 January 1936 Březová, Czechoslovakia
- Died: 28 June 2019 (aged 83)
- Party: Communist Party of Czechoslovakia (1956–1989); Czech Social Democratic Party (1993–?); Party of Civic Rights (2010–2019)
- Education: Czech University of Life Sciences Prague
- Occupation: Politician, manager

František Čuba (23 January 1936, in Březová – 28 June 2019) was a Czech politician and businessman who served as a Senator. Prior to his political career he was the head of JZD Slušovice, a successful agricultural cooperative in Czechoslovakia.
