= Gorenje Brezovo =

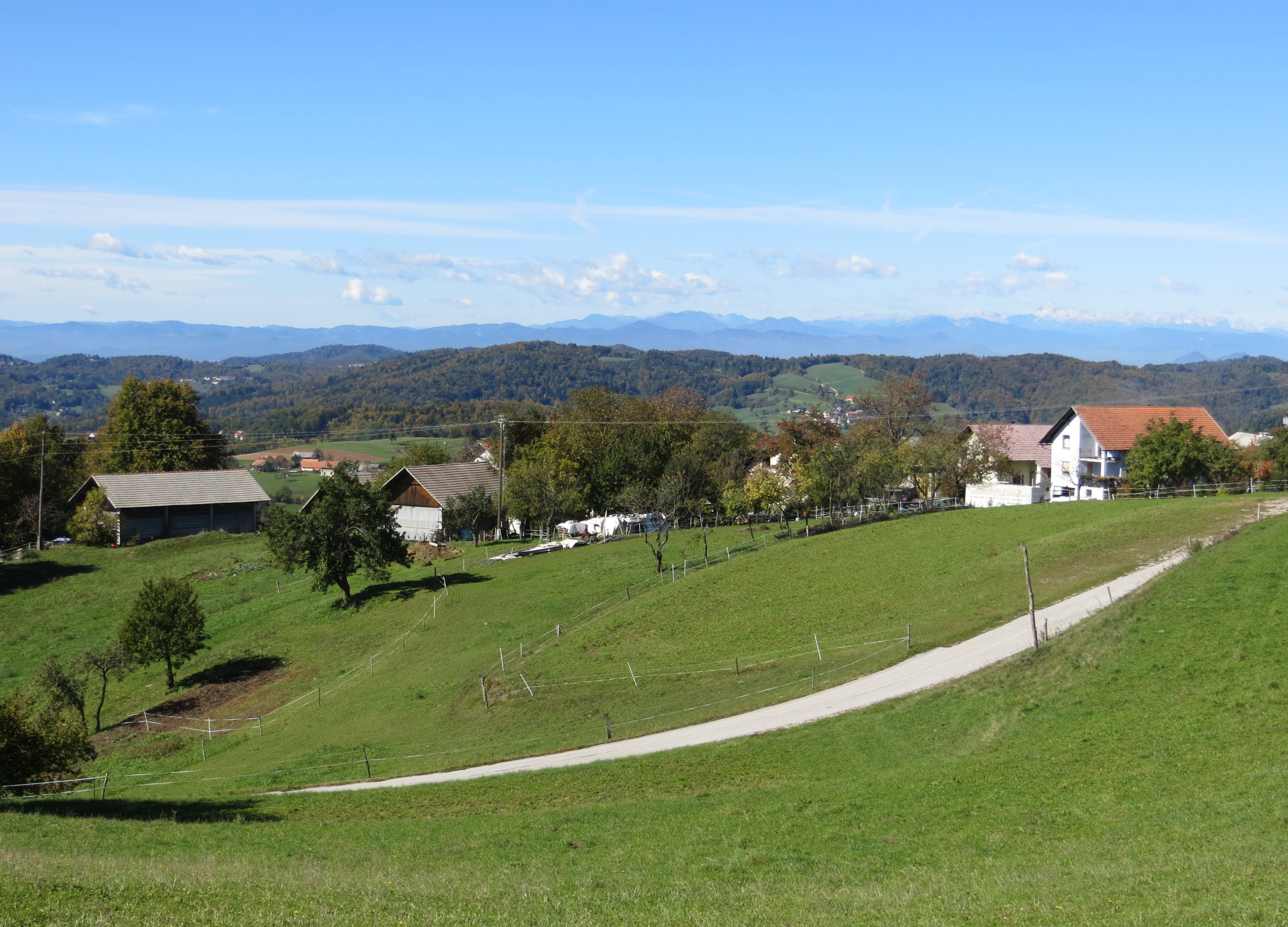

- Location in Slovenia
- Coordinates: 45°59′5.14″N 14°44′13.47″E
- Country: Slovenia
- Traditional region: Lower Carniola
- Statistical region: Central Slovenia
- Municipality: Ivančna Gorica

Area
  - Total: 1.74 km^{2} (0.67 sq mi)
- Elevation: 633.7 m (2,079 ft)

Population (2002)
  - Total: 52

Gorenje Brezovo (pronounced [ɡɔˈɾeːnjɛ ˈbɾeːzɔʋɔ]; German: Oberbresow) is a settlement in the hills north of Višnja Gora in the Municipality of Ivančna Gorica in central Slovenia. The area is part of the historical region of Lower Carniola and is now included in the Central Slovenia Statistical Region.

In the 19th century numerous Roman-period artefacts were found in and around the village, believed to be the location of a large Roman burial ground, although its precise location and extent have not been determined. Some of the artefacts are kept by the Vienna Museum of Natural History
