= Davle =

- Market town
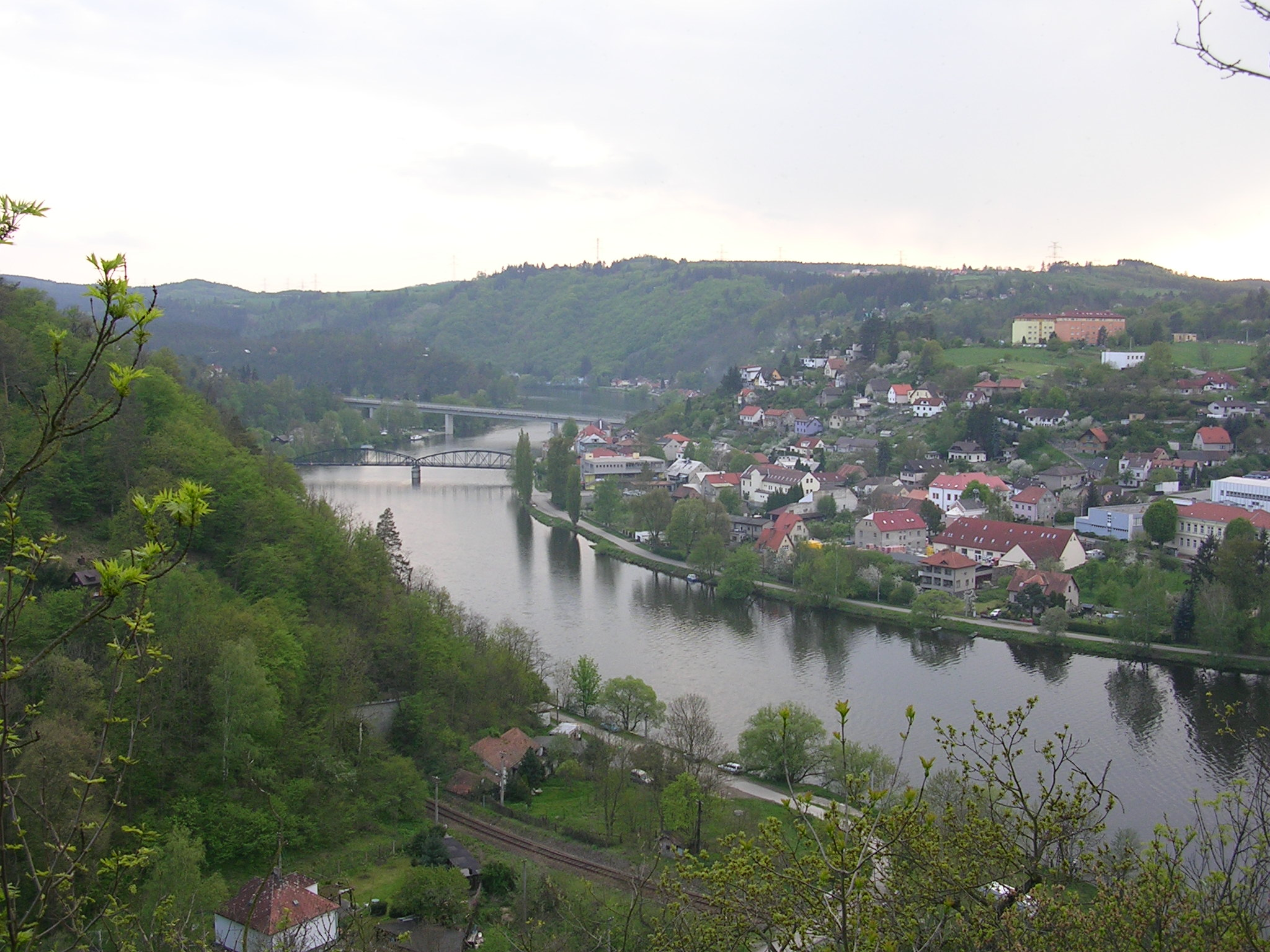
- View from the northeast across the Vltava

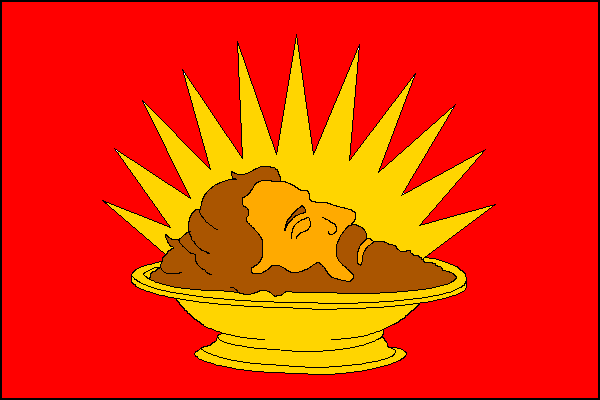
- Flag Coat of arms

- Location in the Czech Republic
- Coordinates: 49°53′35″N 14°23′12″E
- Country: Czech Republic
- Region: Central Bohemian
- District: Prague-West
- First mentioned: 999

Area
  - Total: 7.47 km^{2} (2.88 sq mi)
- Elevation: 325 m (1,066 ft)

Population (2026-01-01)
  - Total: 1,911
  - Density: 256/km^{2} (663/sq mi)
- Time zone: UTC+1 (CET)
  - Summer (DST): UTC+2 (CEST)
- Postal code: 252 06
- Website: www.mestysdavle.cz

Davle (Czech pronunciation: [ˈdavlɛ]) is a market town in Prague-West District in the Central Bohemian Region of the Czech Republic. It has about 1,900 inhabitants. The market town is located at the confluence of the Vltava and Sázava rivers, in the Benešov Uplands.

Davle existed already in the 10th century and its early history is connected with the Ostrov Monastery, which was located here until the 16th century.

== Administrative division ==
Davle consists of three municipal parts (in brackets population according to the 2021 census):

- Davle (1,127)
- Sázava (307)
- Sloup (440)

== Etymology ==
The name is derived from the personal name Davel, meaning "Davel's (court)". Until the 16th century, the settlement was called Davel, but then the name evolved to the feminine gender.

== Geography ==
Davle is located about 13 kilometres (8 mi) south of Prague. It lies in the Benešov Uplands. The highest point is the hill Suchý vrch with an elevation of 381 m (1,250 ft). The market town is situated at the confluence of the Vltava and Sázava rivers.

== History ==
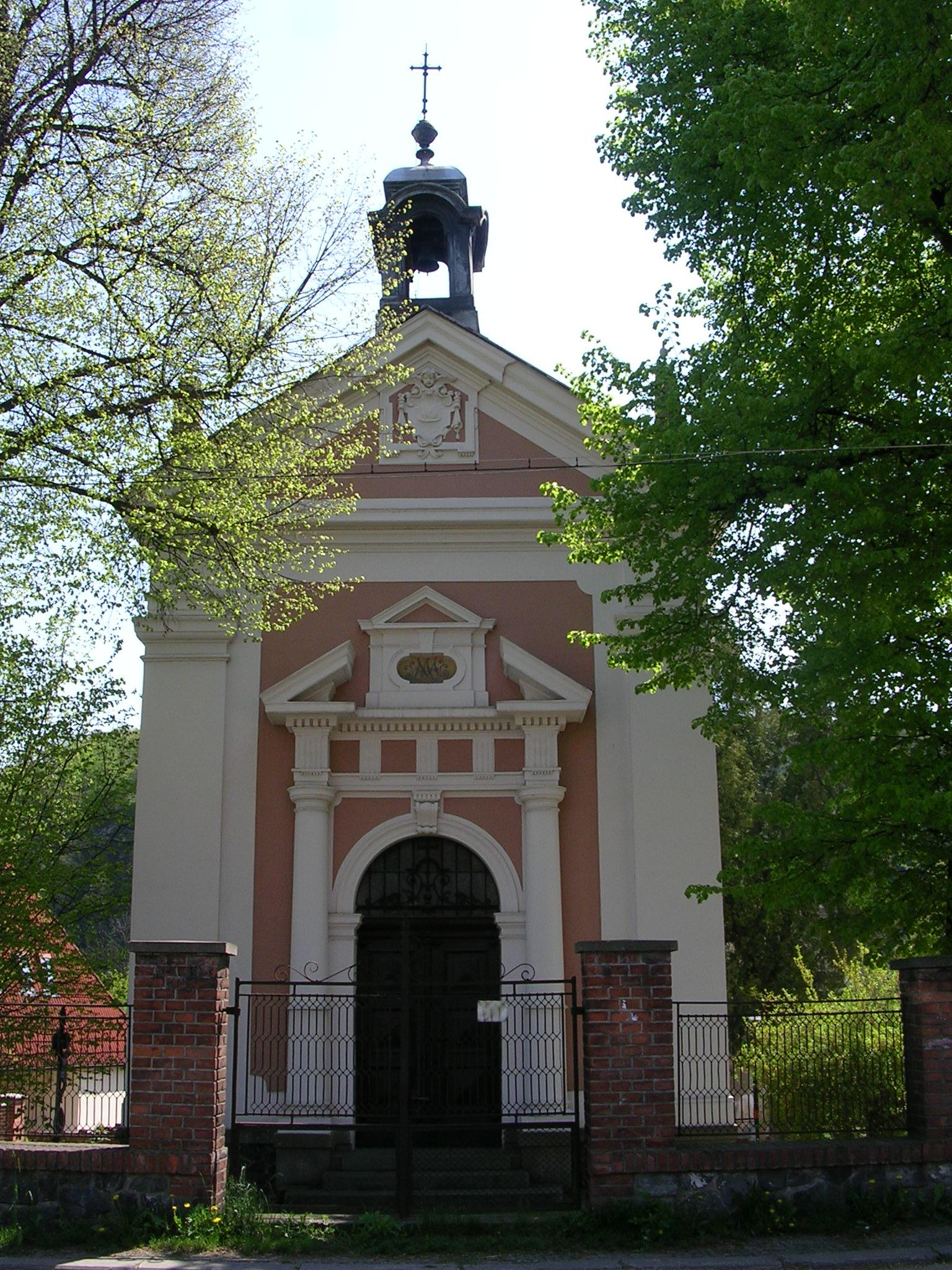
Chapel of the Visitation of the Virgin Mary

The first written mention of Davle is in the founding deed of the Benedictine monastery of St. John the Baptist by Duke Boleslaus II in 999. It became known as Ostrov Monastery, referring to its location on an island (in Czech ostrov).

In the second half of the 13th century, gold was mined around the confluence of the Vltava and Sázava rivers, creating a boom period for the area. In 1310, in a papal bull from Pope Clement V, Davle was referred to as a market town. Davle was also an important stopping point for rafters using the two waterways as trade routes. During the Hussite Wars, the monastery was destroyed and its restoration was unsuccessful. After the monastery was definitely abandoned in 1517, the importance of Davle decreased.

In 1900, a railway line connecting Davle with Prague was completed.

In 1848, Davle was incorporated into a municipality with the nearby villages of Měchenice, Sloup and Svatý Kilián. In the 1950s Svatý Kilián lost its status of a municipal part. In 1960, Měchenice became a separate municipality. The village of Sázava was annexed to Davle in 1968.

== Demographics ==
Historical population

Year	Pop.	±%
1869	1,057	—
1880	1,129	+6.8%
1890	1,089	−3.5%
1900	1,291	+18.5%
1910	1,218	−5.7%

Year	Pop.	±%
1921	1,100	−9.7%
1930	1,426	+29.6%
1950	1,431	+0.4%
1961	1,566	+9.4%
1970	1,355	−13.5%

Year	Pop.	±%
1980	1,353	−0.1%
1991	1,217	−10.1%
2001	1,168	−4.0%
2011	1,463	+25.3%
2021	1,874	+28.1%

Source: Censuses

== Economy ==
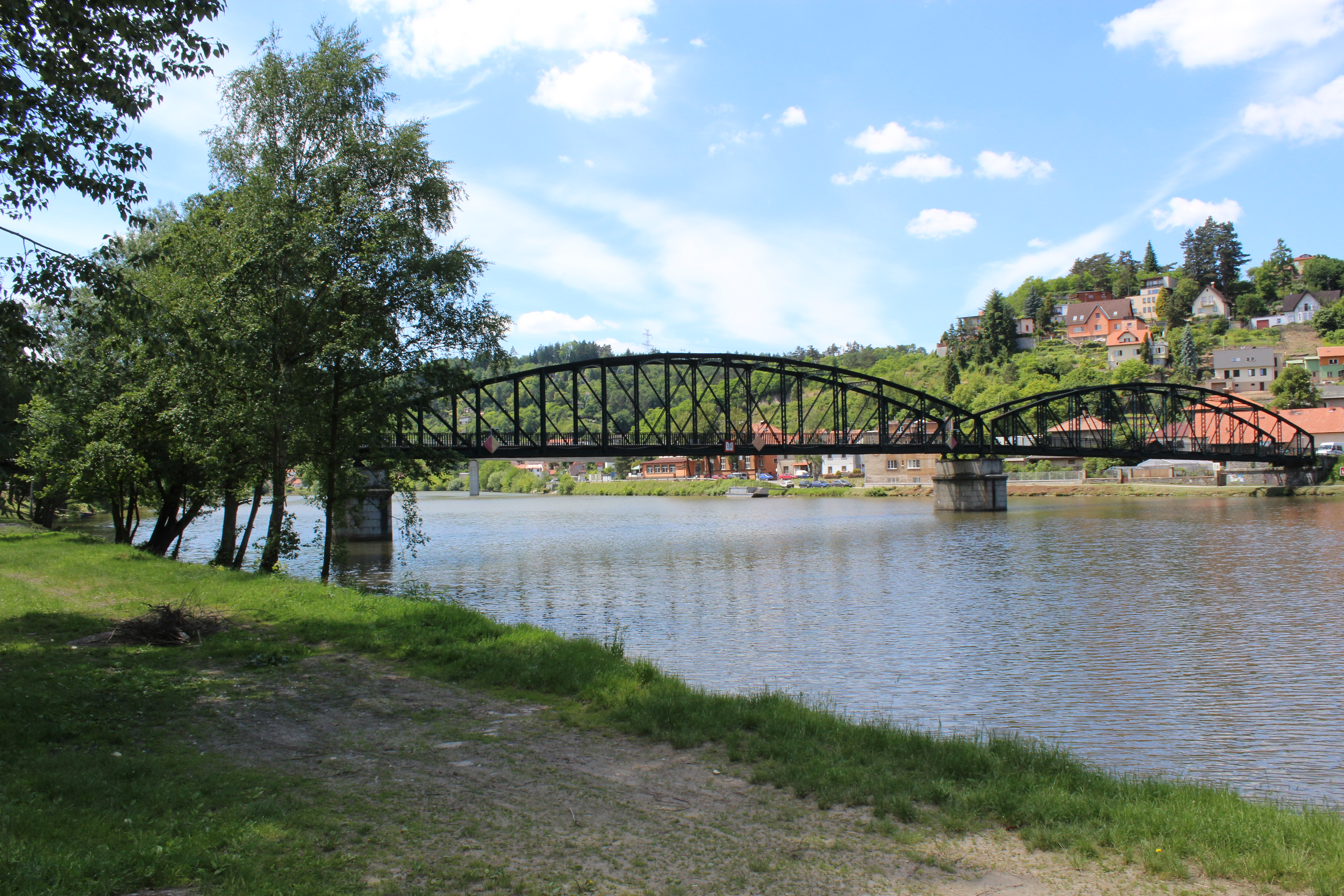
Old Davle Bridge across the Vltava

In 2006, a new sewage and wastewater treatment plant was built near the town.

== Transport ==
Davle is located on the railway line Prague–Čerčany.

== Sights ==
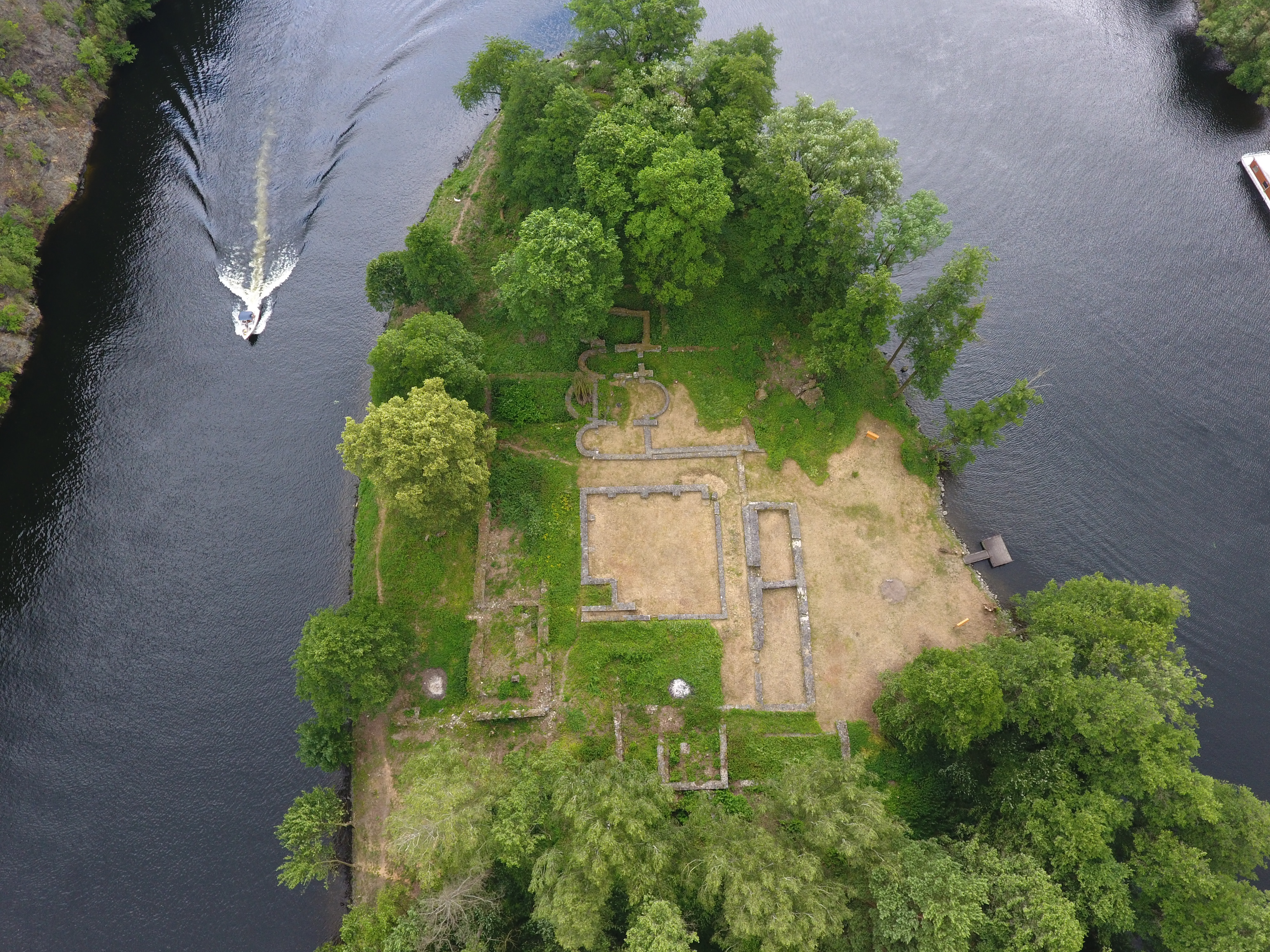
Island of Saint Kilian with the monastery ruins

The Island of St. Kilian with the remains of the former monastery is an archaeological site. There was the Romanesque three-nave basilica of St. John the Baptist from the 12th century and other Romanesque buildings, the foundations of which are still visible today.

On the bank opposite the island is the Church of Saint Kilian. The protected Baroque church complex consists of the church, Chapel of the Holy Sepulchre, bell tower, rectory, Chapel of St. John of Nepomuk, and enclosure walls with gates. The church has a Gothic core. It was probably built shortly after the monastery was founded. It is the only church in the Czech Republic consecrated to Saint Kilian.

The Chapel of the Visitation of the Virgin Mary in the centre of Davle was built in the neo-Baroque style in 1898.

== In popular culture ==
In the summer of 1968, scenes for the film The Bridge at Remagen were filmed using the Old Davle Bridge.
