= Lopeník =

- Municipality
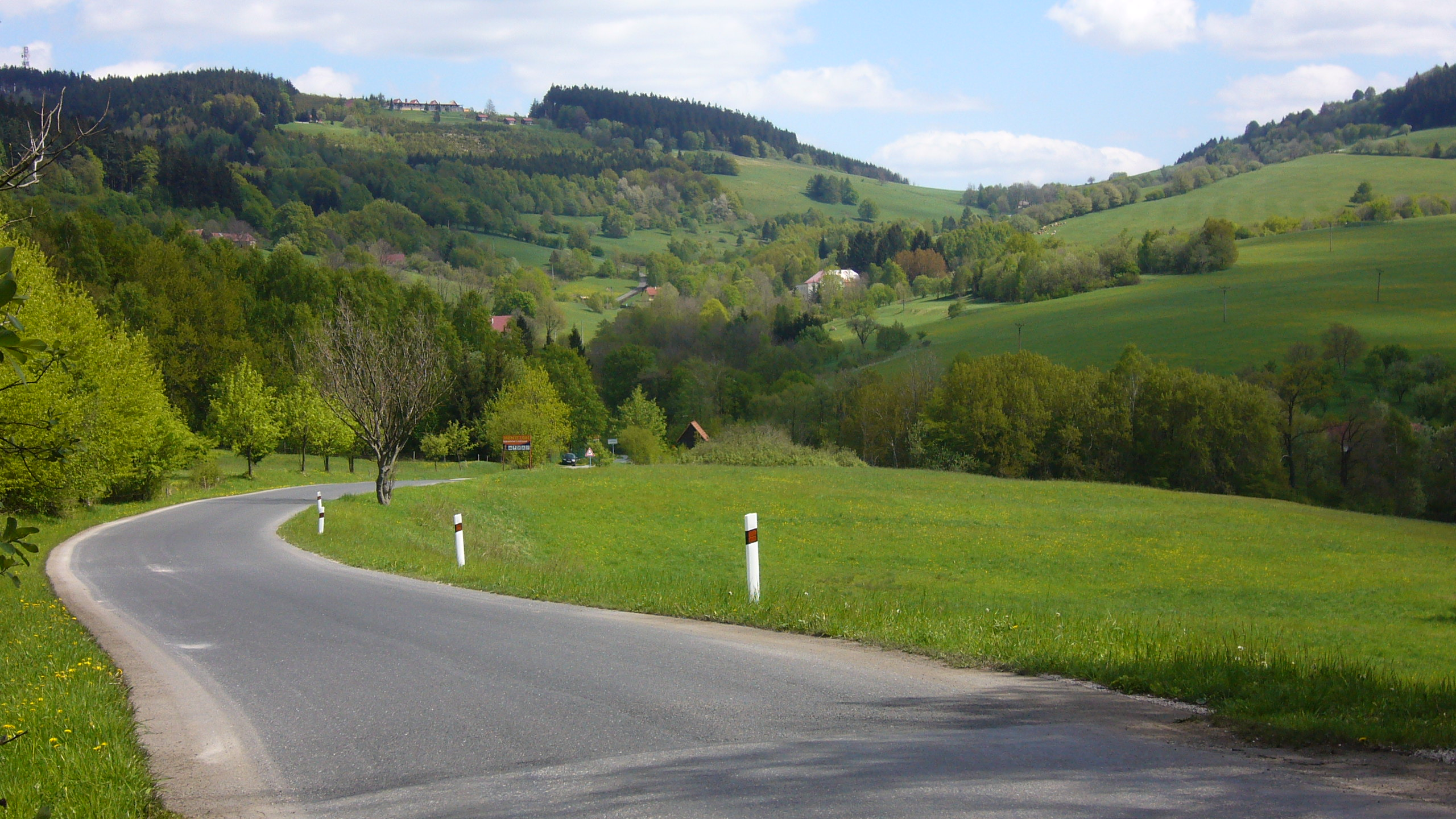
- Area below the Lopeník Pass

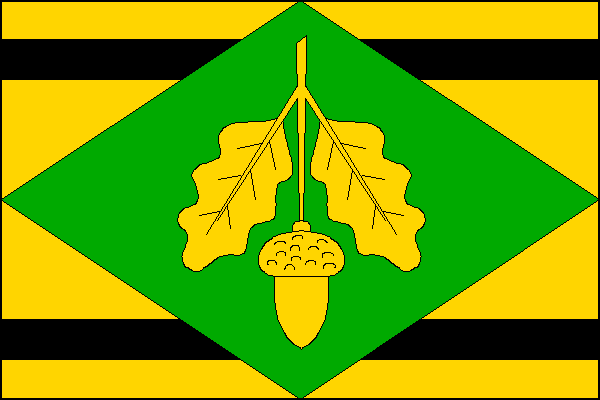
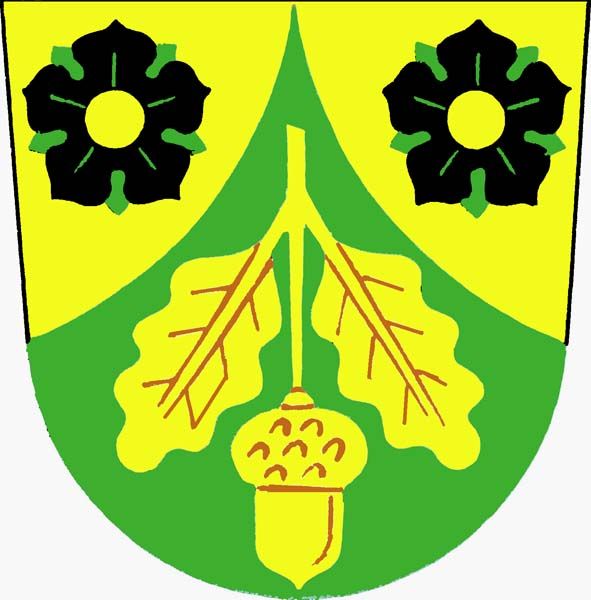
- Flag Coat of arms

- Location in the Czech Republic
- Coordinates: 48°56′44″N 17°47′29″E
- Country: Czech Republic
- Region: Zlín
- District: Uherské Hradiště
- Founded: 1791

Area
  - Total: 12.53 km^{2} (4.84 sq mi)
- Elevation: 537 m (1,762 ft)

Population (2026-01-01)
  - Total: 228
  - Density: 18.2/km^{2} (47.1/sq mi)
- Time zone: UTC+1 (CET)
  - Summer (DST): UTC+2 (CEST)
- Postal code: 687 67
- Website: obec-lopenik.cz

Lopeník is a municipality and village in Uherské Hradiště District in the Zlín Region of the Czech Republic. It has about 200 inhabitants.

Lopeník lies approximately 28 kilometres (17 mi) south-east of Uherské Hradiště, 34 km (21 mi) south of Zlín, and 275 km (171 mi) south-east of Prague.

== Demographics ==
Historical population
Year	Pop.	±%
1869	799	—
1880	861	+7.8%
1890	849	−1.4%
1900	960	+13.1%
1910	1,024	+6.7%
1921	997	−2.6%
1930	999	+0.2%
1950	744	−25.5%
1961	888	+19.4%
1970	655	−26.2%
1980	381	−41.8%
1991	236	−38.1%
2001	209	−11.4%
2011	193	−7.7%
2021	235	+21.8%
Source: Censuses
