= Březová (Zlín District) =

- Municipality
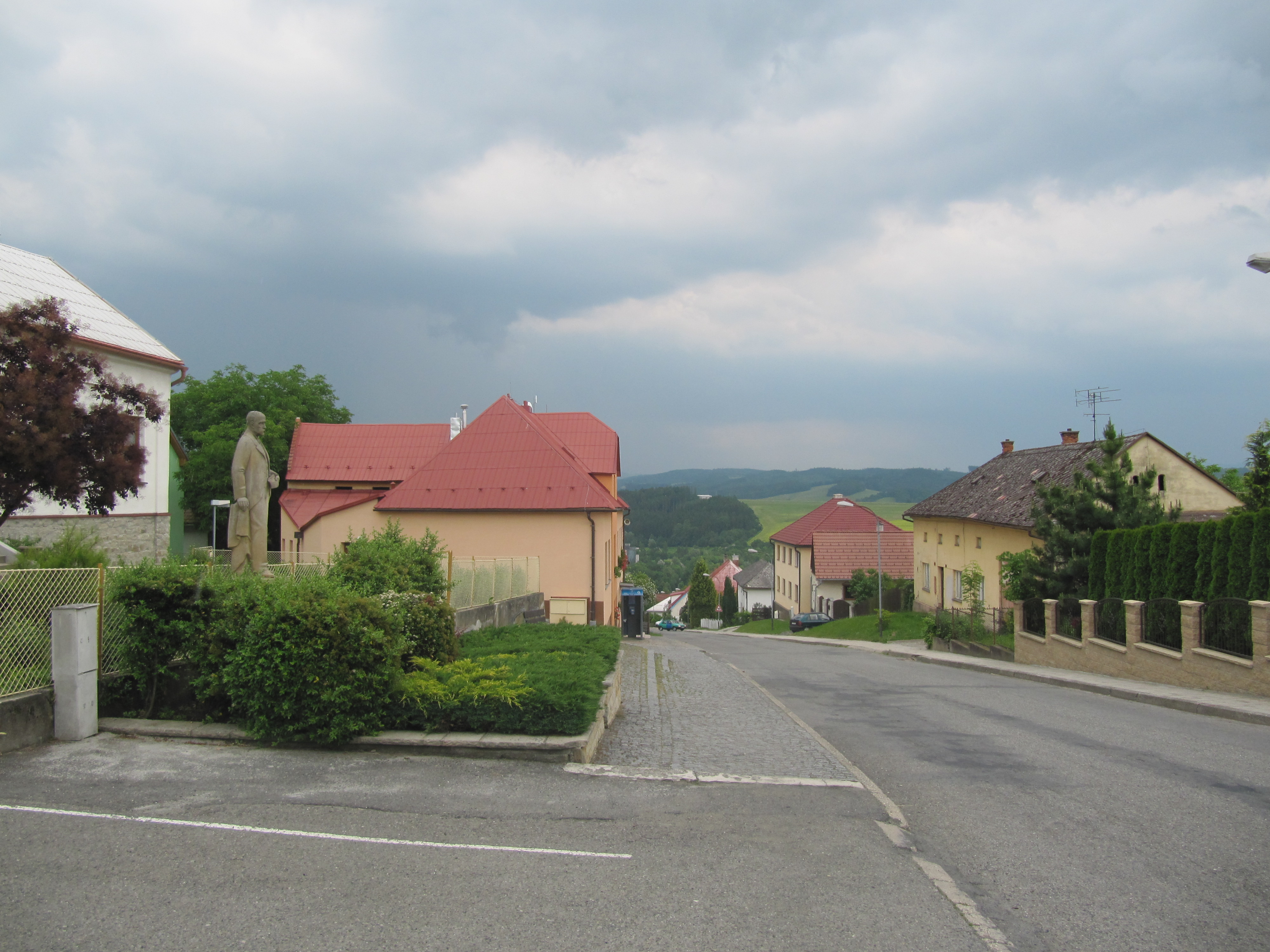
- Main street

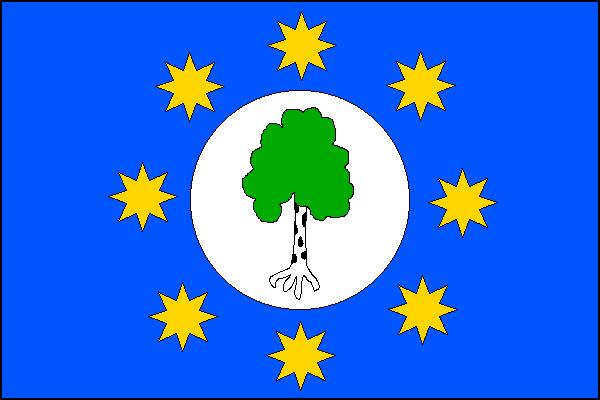
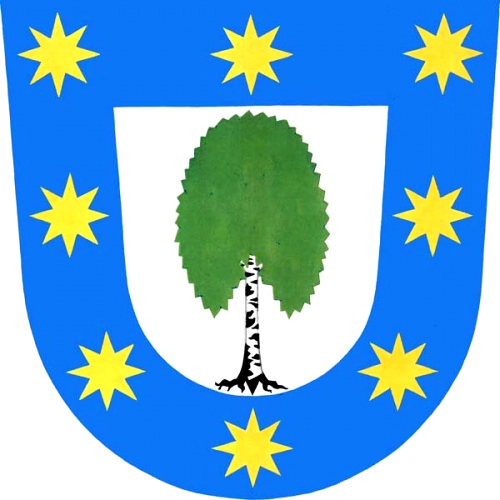
- Flag Coat of arms

- Location in the Czech Republic
- Coordinates: 49°15′37″N 17°47′29″E
- Country: Czech Republic
- Region: Zlín
- District: Zlín
- First mentioned: 1407

Area
  - Total: 2.69 km^{2} (1.04 sq mi)
- Elevation: 348 m (1,142 ft)

Population (2026-01-01)
  - Total: 504
  - Density: 187/km^{2} (485/sq mi)
- Time zone: UTC+1 (CET)
  - Summer (DST): UTC+2 (CEST)
- Postal code: 763 15
- Website: www.brezovauzlina.cz

Březová is a municipality and village in Zlín District in the Zlín Region of the Czech Republic. It has about 500 inhabitants.

Březová lies on the Dřevnice river, approximately 10 kilometres (6 mi) east of Zlín and 260 km (160 mi) east of Prague.

== Demographics ==
Historical population
Year	Pop.	±%
1869	355	—
1880	329	−7.3%
1890	326	−0.9%
1900	359	+10.1%
1910	417	+16.2%
1921	406	−2.6%
1930	430	+5.9%
1950	482	+12.1%
1961	531	+10.2%
1970	503	−5.3%
1980	450	−10.5%
1991	427	−5.1%
2001	443	+3.7%
2011	506	+14.2%
2021	503	−0.6%
Source: Censuses

== Notable people ==
- František Čuba (1936–2019), agronomist and politician
