= Nová Bošáca =

- Municipality
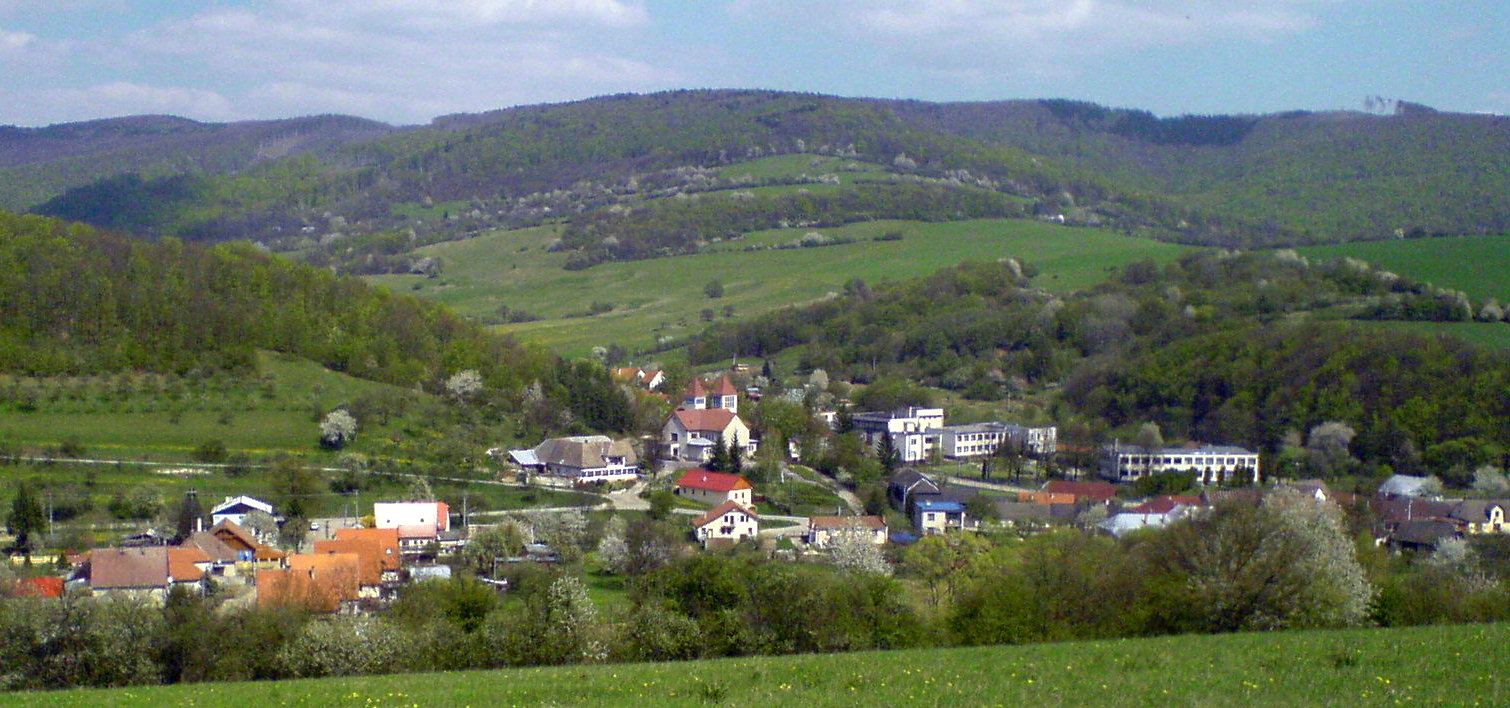

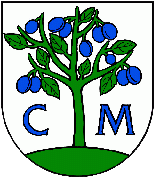
- Flag Coat of arms

- Location of Nová Bošáca in the Trenčín Region Location of Nová Bošáca in Slovakia
- Coordinates: 48.88°N 17.80°E
- Country: Slovakia
- Region: Trenčín Region
- District: Nové Mesto nad Váhom District
- First mentioned: 1950

Area
  - Total: 33.43 km^{2} (12.91 sq mi)
- Elevation: 302 m (991 ft)

Population (2025)
  - Total: 980
- Time zone: UTC+1 (CET)
  - Summer (DST): UTC+2 (CEST)
- Postal code: 913 08
- Area code: +421 32
- Vehicle registration plate (until 2022): NM
- Website: www.novabosaca.sk

Nová Bošáca (Slovak pronunciation: [ˈnɔʋaː ˈbɔʂaːtsa]; Hungarian: Újbosác) is a village and municipality in Nové Mesto nad Váhom District in the Trenčín Region of western Slovakia.

== History ==
In historical records the village was first mentioned in 1950.

The territory of today's Nová Bošáca was in the past a part of the Trenčian capital. In the 18th century, Bošácke kopanice (the current village of Nová Bošáca) was one of the largest dispersed settlements in this area. According to regionalization, the village belongs to the Central Coast region. According to the Ethnographic Atlas of Slovakia, Nová Bošáca is located in the western Slovak lowland area with mountainous elements. Nová Bošáca is part of the Bošáčka Microregion and represents a type of mining settlement. The Bošácka valley forms a micro-region that is interesting both from a cultural and historical point of view, as well as from an ethnographic and naturalistic point of view. It is therefore an attractive place for researchers and tourists. The settlement of this territory is gradually documented by finds from the Stone Age to the early Middle Ages. Before the establishment of independent Czechoslovakia in 1918, the territory of Nová Bošáca was part of Trencsén County within the Kingdom of Hungary. From 1939 to 1945, it was part of the Slovak Republic.

== Geography ==
The municipality lies at an altitude of 302 metres (991 ft) and covers an area of 33.43 km^{2} (12.91 sq mi) (2025).

The village of Nová Bošáca is located in the district of Nové Mesto nad Váhom, approximately 15 kilometers away from the district town. It extends in the White Carpathian range. Nová Bošáca is a border municipality, adjacent to the municipalities of Březová, Lopeník and Vyškovec from the Moravian side. In Slovakia, it borders with the municipalities of Chocholná-Velčice, Haluzice, Bošáca, Zemianske Podhradie and Moravské Liesköve. The highest point of the village is Veľký Lopeník hill with an altitude of 912 meters.

== Population ==
Population statistic (10 years)
Year	1995	2005	2015	2025
Count	1289	1180	1098	980
Difference		−8.45%	−6.94%	−10.74%

Population statistic
Year	2024	2025
Count	1001	980
Difference		−2.09%

It has a population of 980 people (31 December 2025).

=== Ethnicity ===
Census 2021 (1+ %)
Ethnicity	Number	Fraction
Slovak	998	97.17%
Not found out	17	1.65%
Czech	15	1.46%
Total	1027	

In year 2021 was 1027 people by ethnicity 998 as Slovak, 17 as Not found out, 15 as Czech, 3 as Italian, 3 as Other, 2 as Hungarian, 1 as Rusyn and 1 as Austrian.

Note on population: The difference values of population numbers in the table "Population statistic" and in the sections "Ethnicity" & "Religion" is caused by the use of various statistical methods.

=== Religion ===
Census 2021 (1+ %)
Religion	Number	Fraction
Roman Catholic Church	629	61.25%
Evangelical Church	216	21.03%
None	150	14.61%
Not found out	14	1.36%
Total	1027	

In year 2021 was 1027 people by religion 629 from Roman Catholic Church, 216 from Evangelical Church, 150 from None, 14 from Not found out, 9 from Christian Congregations in Slovakia, 4 from Jehovah's Witnesses, 3 from Greek Catholic Church, 1 from Eastern Orthodox Church and 1 from Other.
