= Březová (Beroun District) =

- Municipality
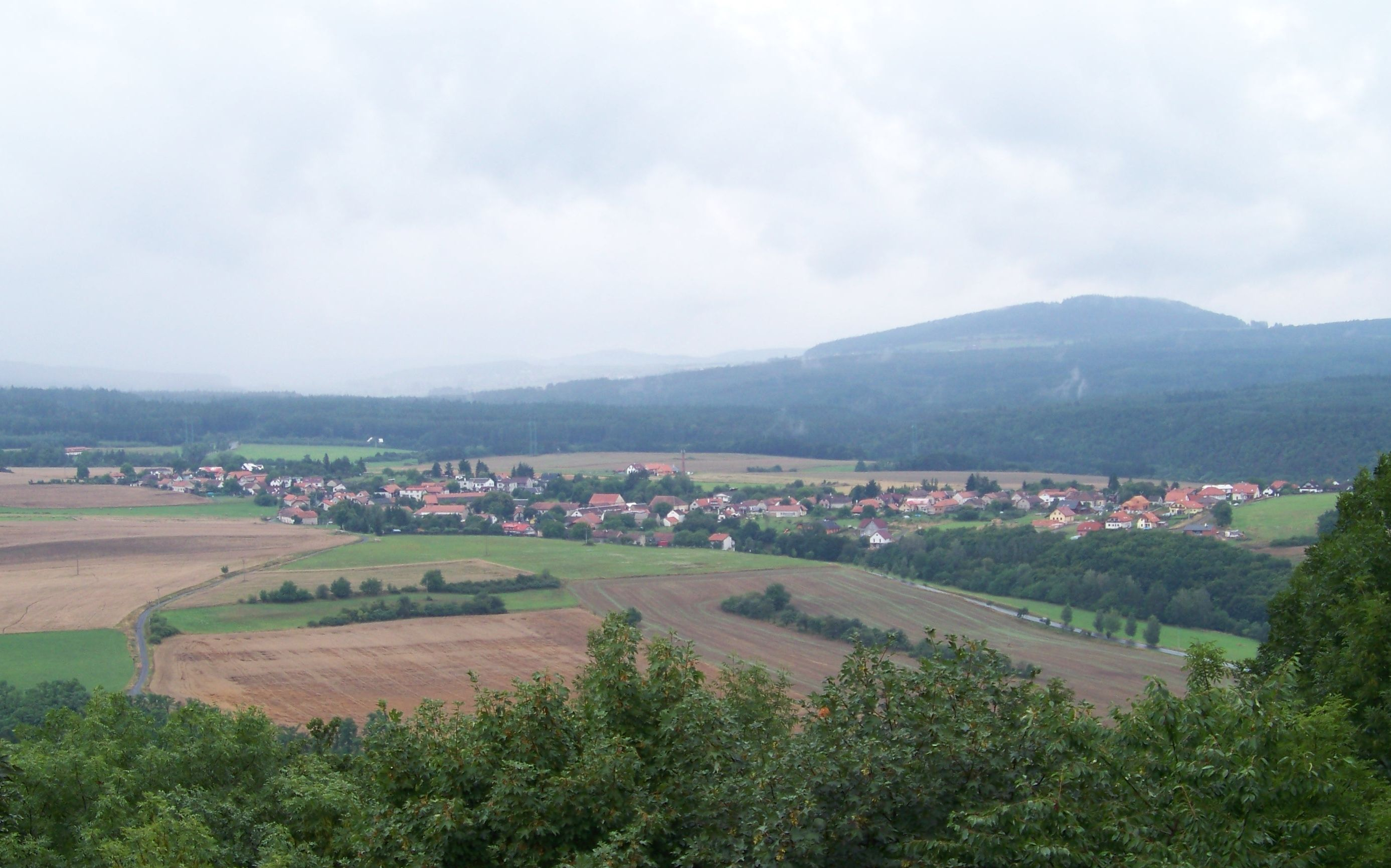
- View on Březová from Točník Castle

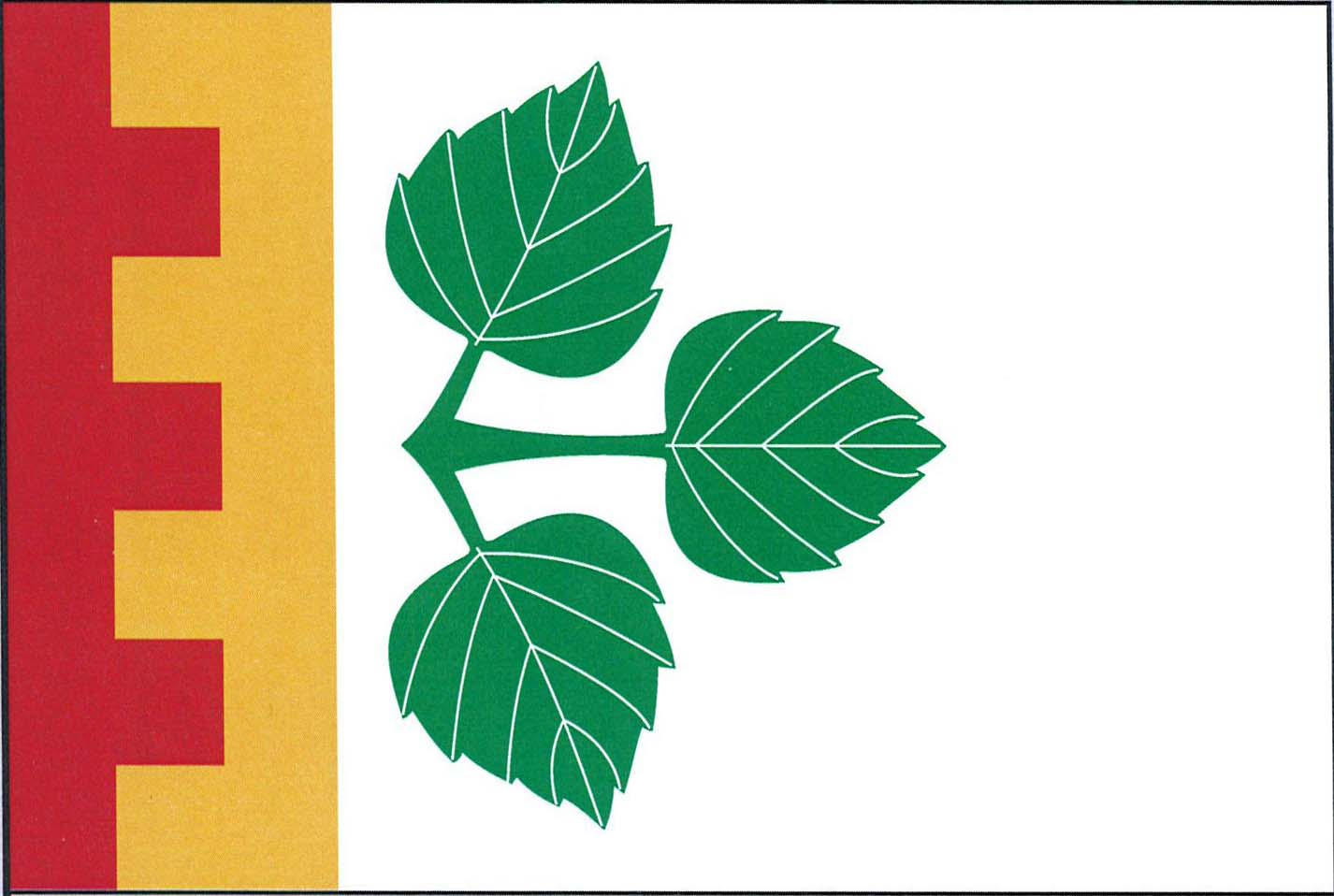
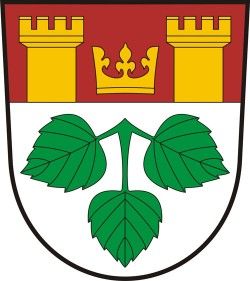
- Flag Coat of arms

- Location in the Czech Republic
- Coordinates: 49°54′15″N 13°52′59″E
- Country: Czech Republic
- Region: Central Bohemian
- District: Beroun
- First mentioned: 1399

Area
  - Total: 4.63 km^{2} (1.79 sq mi)
- Elevation: 351 m (1,152 ft)

Population (2026-01-01)
  - Total: 338
  - Density: 73.0/km^{2} (189/sq mi)
- Time zone: UTC+1 (CET)
  - Summer (DST): UTC+2 (CEST)
- Postal code: 267 51
- Website: www.brezova-be.cz

Březová is a municipality and village in Beroun District in the Central Bohemian Region of the Czech Republic. It has about 300 inhabitants.

== Demographics ==
Historical population
Year	Pop.	±%
1869	346	—
1880	346	+0.0%
1890	353	+2.0%
1900	354	+0.3%
1910	419	+18.4%
1921	452	+7.9%
1930	415	−8.2%
1950	315	−24.1%
1961	337	+7.0%
1970	287	−14.8%
1980	260	−9.4%
1991	254	−2.3%
2001	239	−5.9%
2011	271	+13.4%
2021	338	+24.7%
Source: Censuses
