= Všelibice =

- Municipality
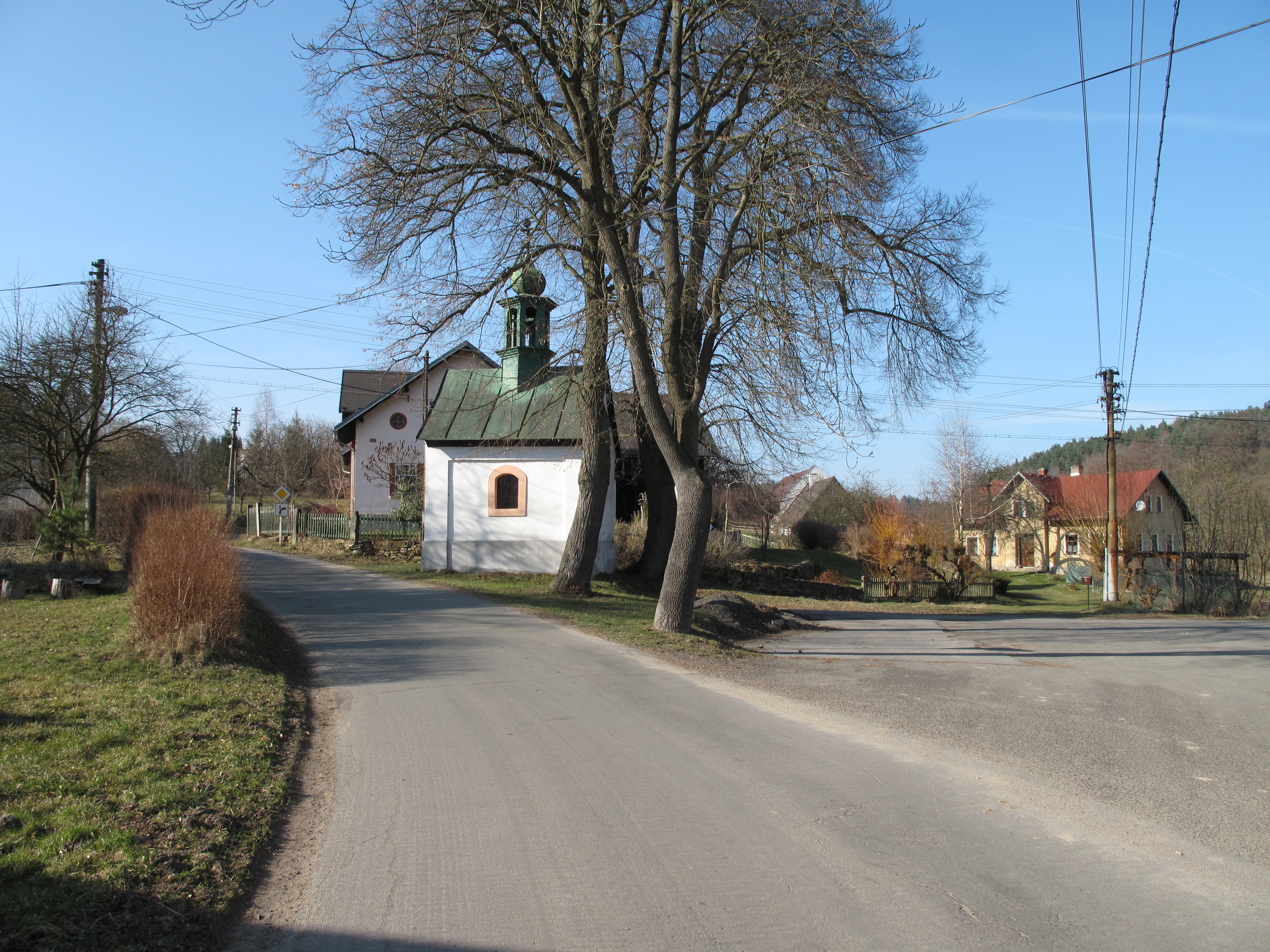
- Chapel in Všelibice

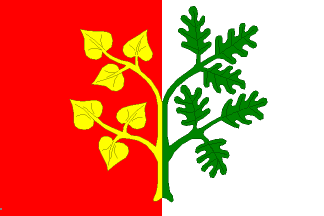
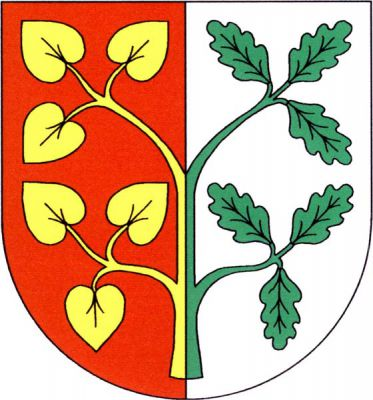
- Flag Coat of arms

- Location in the Czech Republic
- Coordinates: 50°38′46″N 14°57′5″E
- Country: Czech Republic
- Region: Liberec
- District: Liberec
- First mentioned: 1419

Area
  - Total: 18.44 km^{2} (7.12 sq mi)
- Elevation: 386 m (1,266 ft)

Population (2026-01-01)
  - Total: 658
  - Density: 35.7/km^{2} (92.4/sq mi)
- Time zone: UTC+1 (CET)
  - Summer (DST): UTC+2 (CEST)
- Postal code: 463 48
- Website: www.vselibice.cz

Všelibice (German: Schellwitz) is a municipality and village in Liberec District in the Liberec Region of the Czech Republic. It has about 700 inhabitants.

== Administrative division ==
Všelibice consists of 13 municipal parts (in brackets population according to the 2021 census):

- Všelibice (220)
- Benešovice (4)
- Březová (35)
- Budíkov (73)
- Chlístov (2)
- Lísky (18)
- Malčice (37)
- Nantiškov (3)
- Nesvačily (12)
- Podjestřábí (7)
- Přibyslavice (10)
- Roveň (109)
- Vrtky (65)

== History ==
The first written mention of Všelibice is from 1419.

== Demographics ==
Historical population
Year	Pop.	±%
1869	1,850	—
1880	1,892	+2.3%
1890	1,836	−3.0%
1900	1,810	−1.4%
1910	1,670	−7.7%
1921	1,499	−10.2%
1930	1,338	−10.7%
1950	869	−35.1%
1961	768	−11.6%
1970	596	−22.4%
1980	515	−13.6%
1991	501	−2.7%
2001	501	+0.0%
2011	528	+5.4%
2021	595	+12.7%
Source: Censuses
