= Březová-Oleško =

- Municipality
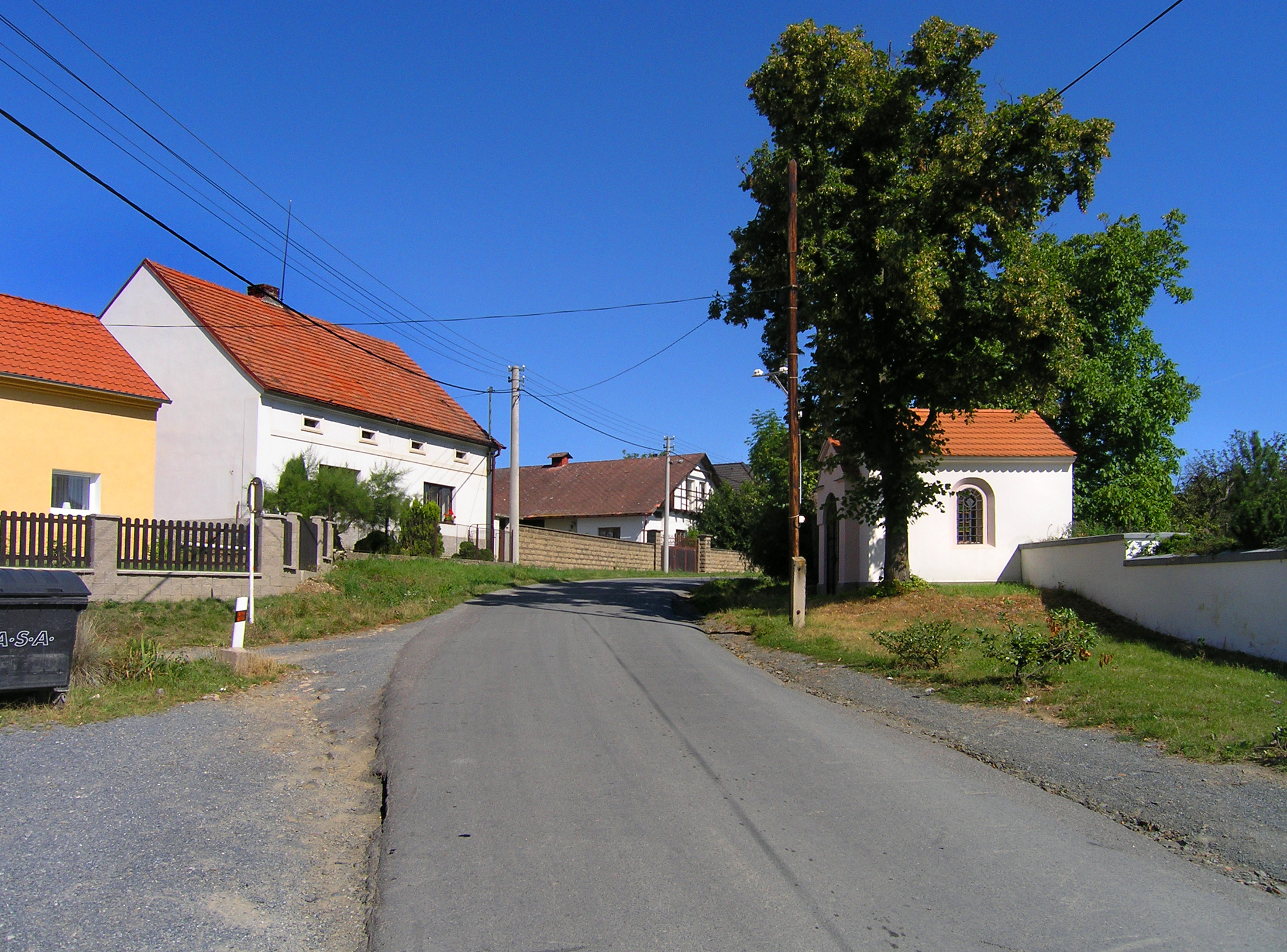
- Hlavní street in Oleško

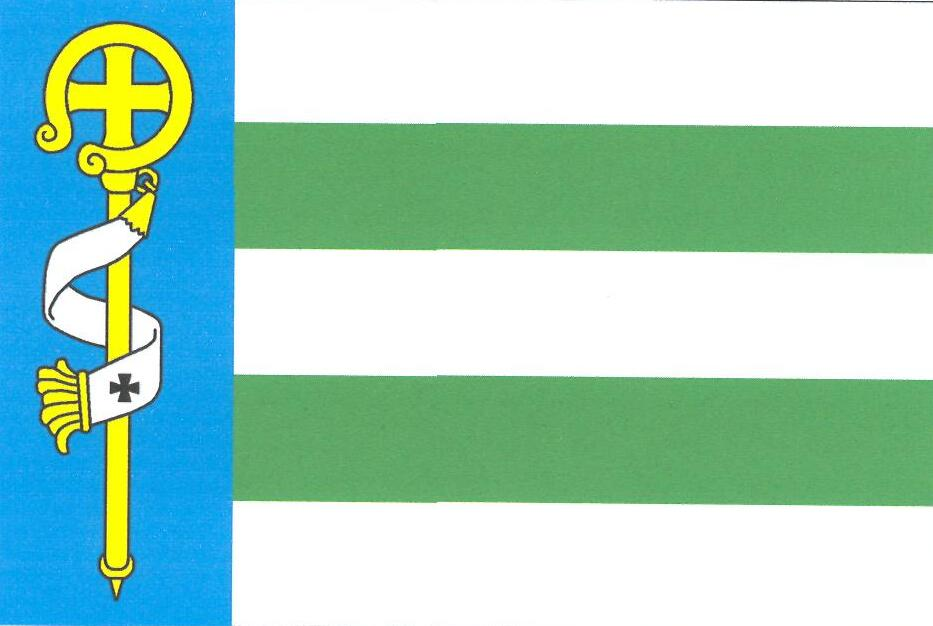
- Flag Coat of arms

- Location in the Czech Republic
- Coordinates: 49°54′52″N 14°24′59″E
- Country: Czech Republic
- Region: Central Bohemian
- District: Prague-West
- First mentioned: 1310

Area
  - Total: 6.48 km^{2} (2.50 sq mi)
- Elevation: 335 m (1,099 ft)

Population (2026-01-01)
  - Total: 1,475
  - Density: 228/km^{2} (590/sq mi)
- Time zone: UTC+1 (CET)
  - Summer (DST): UTC+2 (CEST)
- Postal code: 252 45
- Website: www.brezova-olesko.cz

Březová-Oleško is a municipality in Prague-West District in the Central Bohemian Region of the Czech Republic. It has about 1,500 inhabitants. It is located on a promontory above the Vltava River.

== Administrative division ==
Březová-Oleško consists of two municipal parts (in brackets population according to the 2021 census):

- Březová (727)
- Oleško (746)

== Etymology ==
The name Březová is an adjective from bříza, i.e. 'birch'. The name Oleško was probably derived from the personal name Oleš, which was a Czech variant of Alexius.

== Geography ==
Březová-Oleško is located about 19 kilometres (12 mi) south of Prague. It lies on the Prague Plateau on the right bank of the Vltava River. The highest point is the hill V Hoře at 392 m (1,286 ft) above sea level. The municipality is situated on a promontory delimited by the valleys of the Vltava and the stream Zahořanský potok.

== History ==
The first written mention of both villages is from 1310 (as part of a donation to the Ostrov Monastery in Davle, written in a deed of Pope Clement V).

== Demographics ==
Historical population

Year	Pop.	±%
1869	195	—
1880	209	+7.2%
1890	254	+21.5%
1900	239	−5.9%
1910	217	−9.2%

Year	Pop.	±%
1921	211	−2.8%
1930	254	+20.4%
1950	398	+56.7%
1961	434	+9.0%
1970	366	−15.7%

Year	Pop.	±%
1980	302	−17.5%
1991	254	−15.9%
2001	372	+46.5%
2011	929	+149.7%
2021	1,473	+58.6%

Source: Censuses

== Transport ==
The municipality can be reached by regular transport from Prague, but it is impassable for cars as it is a dead end.

== Sights ==
There are no protected cultural monuments in the municipality.
