= Březová (Uherské Hradiště District) =

- Municipality
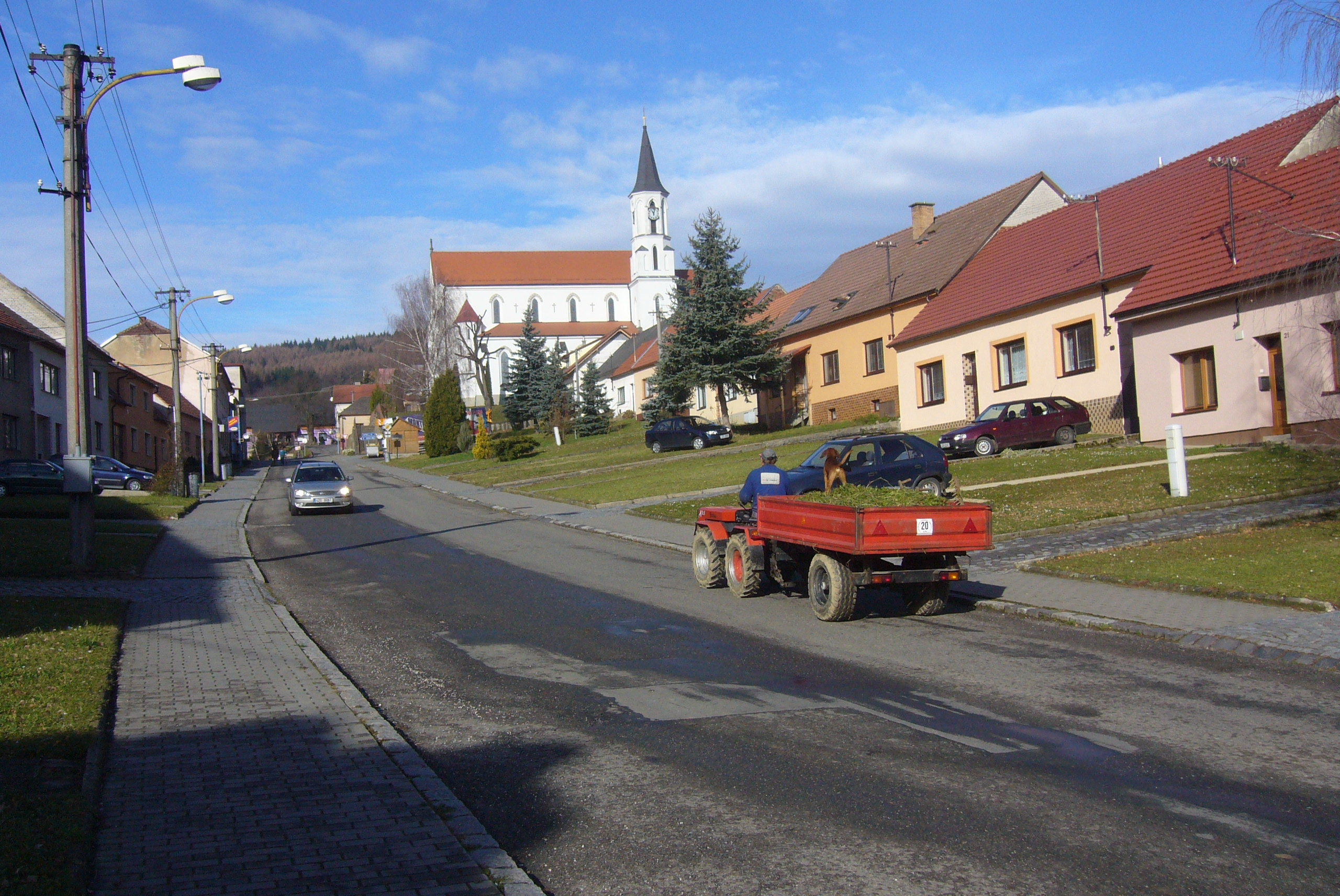
- Centre of Březová

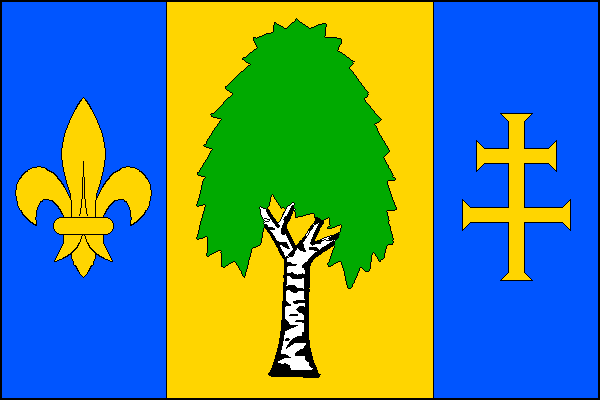
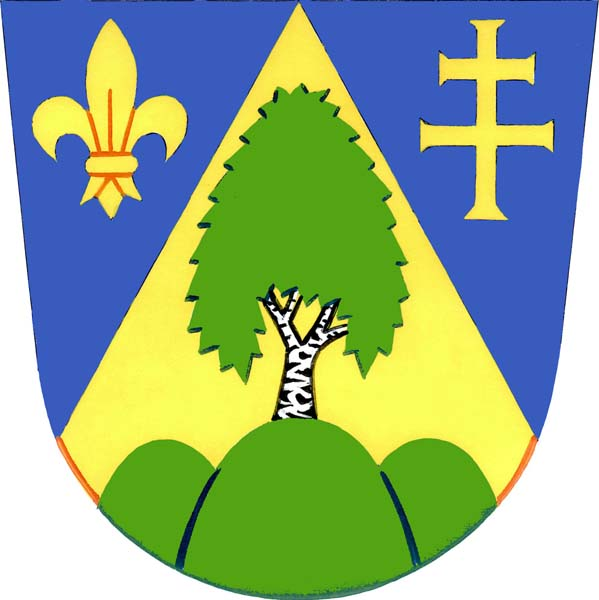
- Flag Coat of arms

- Location in the Czech Republic
- Coordinates: 48°55′32″N 17°44′23″E
- Country: Czech Republic
- Region: Zlín
- District: Uherské Hradiště
- First mentioned: 1351

Area
  - Total: 13.74 km^{2} (5.31 sq mi)
- Elevation: 433 m (1,421 ft)

Population (2026-01-01)
  - Total: 961
  - Density: 69.9/km^{2} (181/sq mi)
- Time zone: UTC+1 (CET)
  - Summer (DST): UTC+2 (CEST)
- Postal code: 687 67
- Website: www.obecbrezova.cz

Březová is a municipality and village in Uherské Hradiště District in the Zlín Region of the Czech Republic. It has about 1,000 inhabitants.

== Etymology ==
The name Březová is derived from Czech word bříza ('birch'). It refers to the landscape of birch trees, which was previously typical for this region.

== Geography ==
Březová is located about 25 kilometres (16 mi) southeast of Uherské Hradiště and 34 km (21 mi) south of Zlín, on the border with Slovakia. It lies in the White Carpathians mountain range. The highest point is at 832 m (2,730 ft) above sea level. The village is situated in the valley of the Hrubár Stream.

== History ==
The settlement of the area began with the establishment of the Cistercian monastery Smilheim, which was built in 1261. The first written mention of Březová is from 1492.

== Demographics ==
Historical population

Year	Pop.	±%
1869	778	—
1880	661	−15.0%
1890	749	+13.3%
1900	850	+13.5%
1910	1,051	+23.6%

Year	Pop.	±%
1921	1,080	+2.8%
1930	1,068	−1.1%
1950	1,218	+14.0%
1961	1,483	+21.8%
1970	1,357	−8.5%

Year	Pop.	±%
1980	1,238	−8.8%
1991	1,186	−4.2%
2001	1,131	−4.6%
2011	1,000	−11.6%
2021	933	−6.7%

Source: Censuses

== Transport ==
On the Czech–Slovak border is the road border crossing Březová / Nová Bošáca.

== Sights ==
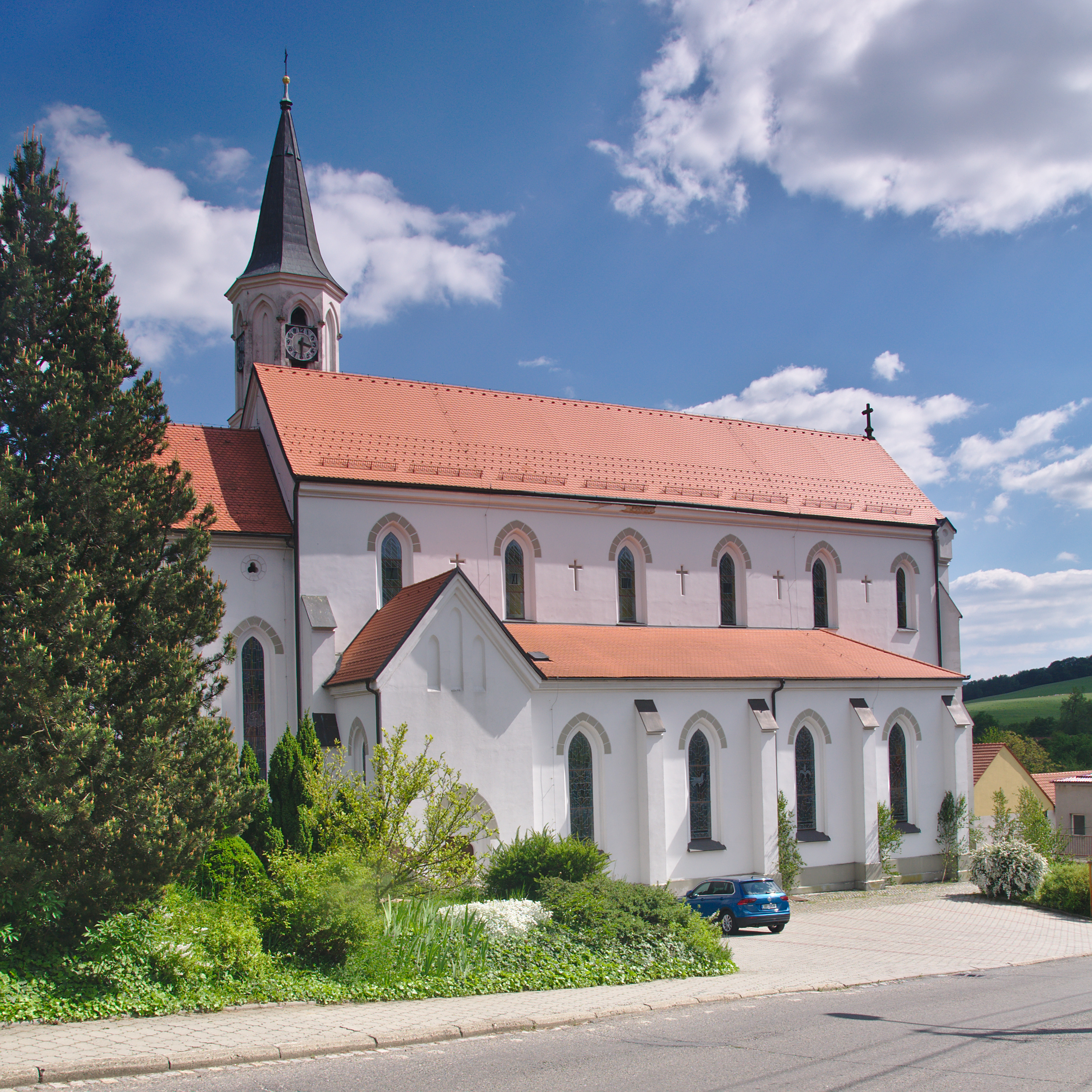
Church of Saints Cyril and Methodius

The main landmark of Březová is the Church of Saints Cyril and Methodius. Initially, there was a small chapel first mentioned in 1662. In 1747, a little church replaced the chapel. The contemporary church was constructed in 1865.

In 1576, the medical doctor Tomáš Jordán of Klausenburk mentioned Březová's spring in his book about healing water. The spring is considered to be healing and is generally known under the name of Kyselka. The area with the spring is a tourist destination.

A 13 metres (43 ft)-high wooden observation tower is located in the western part of Březová. It was built together with five other identical towers in 2011.

== Notable people ==
- Leoš Janáček (1854–1928), composer; visited Březová for several times to be inspired here by a variety of regional folk songs
