= Březová (Opava District) =

- Market town
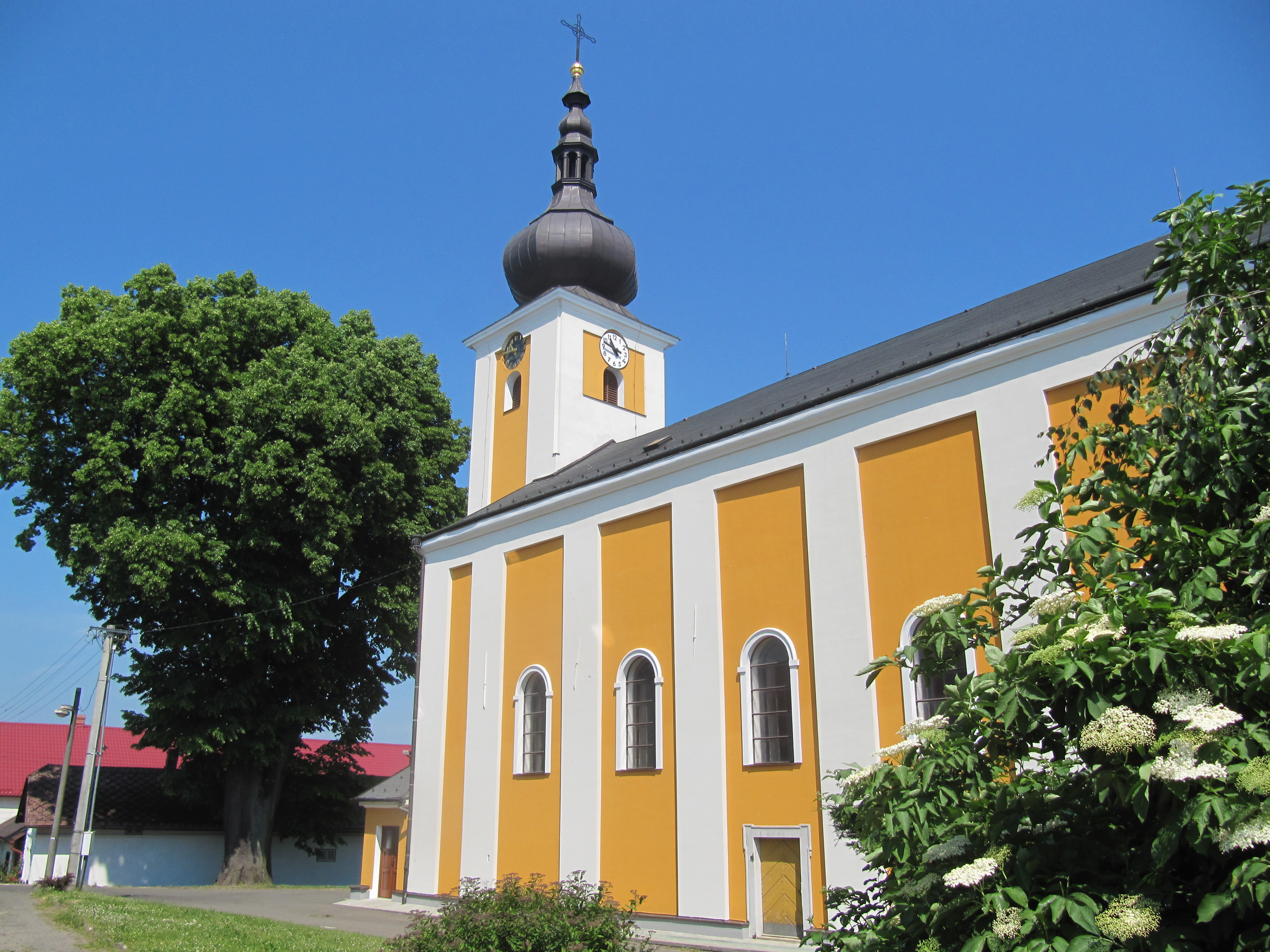
- Church of Saint Nicholas

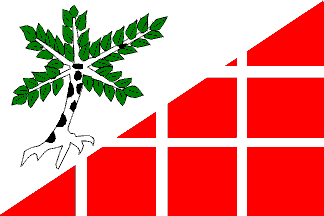
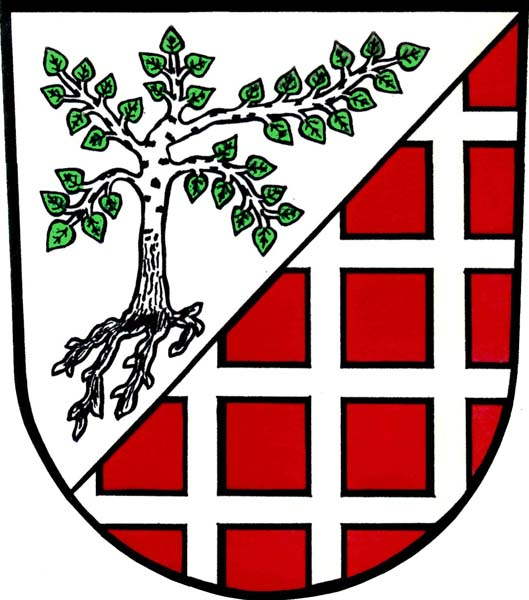
- Flag Coat of arms

- Location in the Czech Republic
- Coordinates: 49°47′30″N 17°51′56″E
- Country: Czech Republic
- Region: Moravian-Silesian
- District: Opava
- First mentioned: 1238

Area
  - Total: 38.93 km^{2} (15.03 sq mi)
- Elevation: 520 m (1,710 ft)

Population (2026-01-01)
  - Total: 1,410
  - Density: 36.2/km^{2} (93.8/sq mi)
- Time zone: UTC+1 (CET)
  - Summer (DST): UTC+2 (CEST)
- Postal code: 747 44
- Website: www.mestys-brezova.cz

Březová (Czech pronunciation: [ˈbr̝ɛzovaː]; German: Briesau) is a market town in Opava District in the Moravian-Silesian Region of the Czech Republic. It has about 1,400 inhabitants.

== Administrative division ==
Březová consists of five municipal parts (in brackets population according to the 2021 census):

- Březová (489)
- Gručovice (109)
- Jančí (171)
- Leskovec (293)
- Lesní Albrechtice (261)

== Etymology ==
The name Březová is derived from the Czech word bříza, i.e. 'birch'.

== Geography ==
Březová is located about 16 kilometres (10 mi) south of Opava and 27 km (17 mi) west of Ostrava. It lies in the Nízký Jeseník range. The highest point is at 537 m (1,762 ft) above sea level. The Moravice River briefly flows along the northwestern municipal border. The Gručovka Stream originates here and flows around the village to the south.

== History ==
The first written mention of Březová is from 1238. From the mid-14th century until the mid-17th century, it was a town. Since 2018, it has the status of a market town.

== Demographics ==
Historical population

Year	Pop.	±%
1869	1,755	—
1880	1,721	−1.9%
1890	1,671	−2.9%
1900	1,624	−2.8%
1910	1,656	+2.0%

Year	Pop.	±%
1921	1,690	+2.1%
1930	1,616	−4.4%
1950	1,067	−34.0%
1961	1,244	+16.6%
1970	1,245	+0.1%

Year	Pop.	±%
1980	1,252	+0.6%
1991	1,319	+5.4%
2001	1,294	−1.9%
2011	1,333	+3.0%
2021	1,323	−0.8%

Source: Censuses

== Transport ==
The I/57 road from Opava to Nový Jičín runs through the municipality.

== Sights ==
The main landmark of Březová is the Church of Saint Nicholas. It was built in the Baroque style after 1695. In 1862–1864, it was extended.
