= Březová (Karlovy Vary District) =

- Municipality
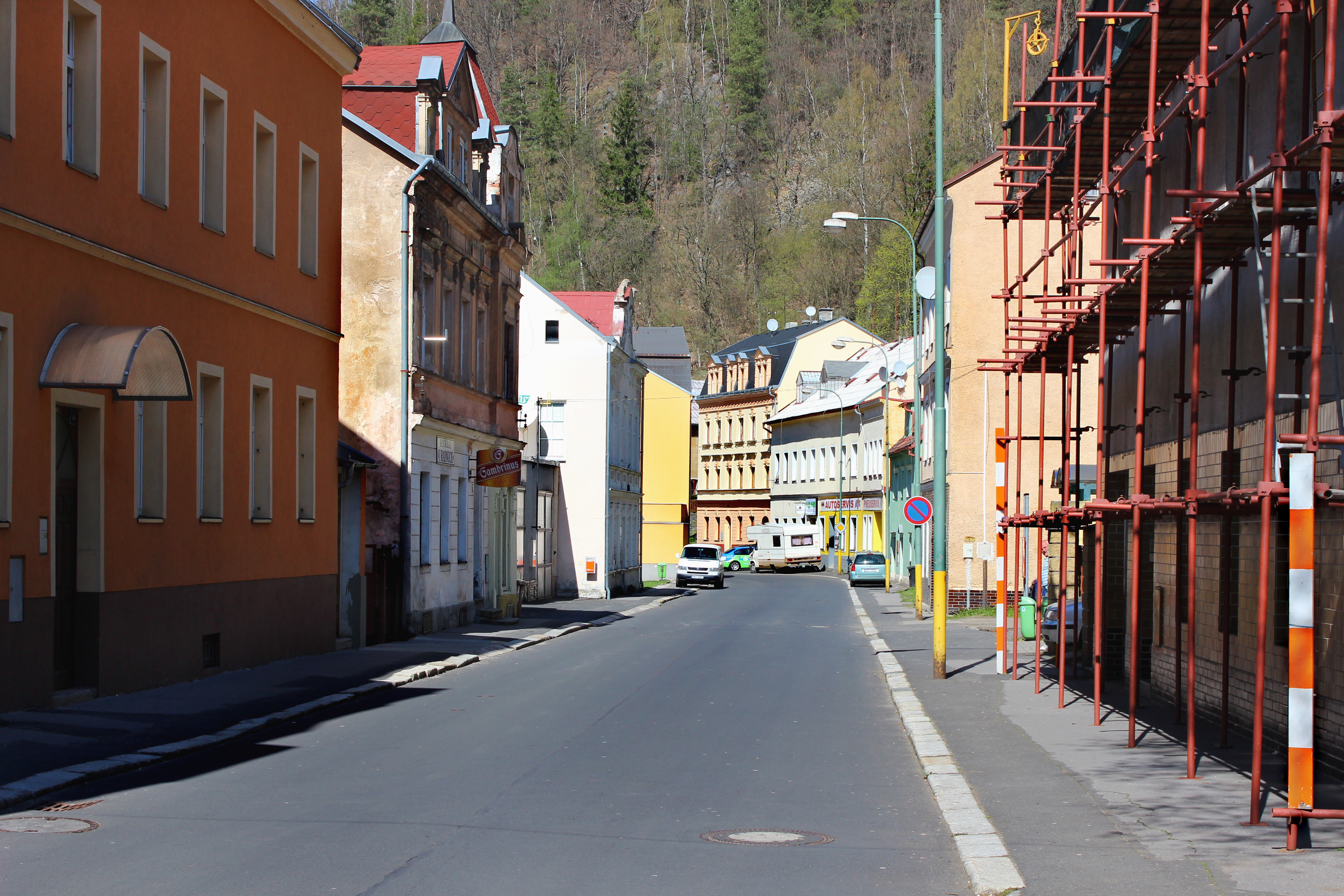
- Hamerská street

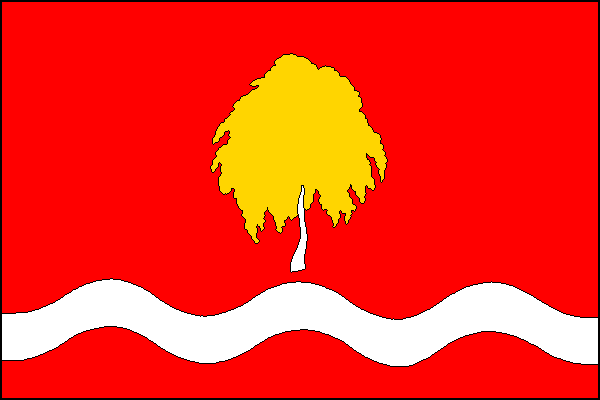
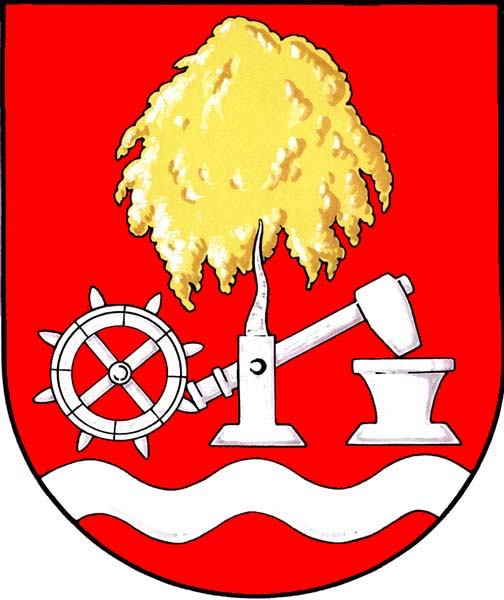
- Flag Coat of arms

- Location in the Czech Republic
- Coordinates: 50°11′53″N 12°52′17″E
- Country: Czech Republic
- Region: Karlovy Vary
- District: Karlovy Vary
- First mentioned: 1543

Area
  - Total: 2.08 km^{2} (0.80 sq mi)
- Elevation: 420 m (1,380 ft)

Population (2026-01-01)
  - Total: 714
  - Density: 343/km^{2} (889/sq mi)
- Time zone: UTC+1 (CET)
  - Summer (DST): UTC+2 (CEST)
- Postal code: 360 01
- Website: www.brezovaukv.cz

Březová (German: Pirkenhammer) is a municipality and village in Karlovy Vary District in the Karlovy Vary Region of the Czech Republic. It has about 700 inhabitants.

== Demographics ==
Historical population
Year	Pop.	±%
1869	1,287	—
1880	1,378	+7.1%
1890	1,461	+6.0%
1900	1,639	+12.2%
1910	1,807	+10.3%
1921	1,519	−15.9%
1930	1,726	+13.6%
1950	627	−63.7%
1961	715	+14.0%
1970	589	−17.6%
1980	549	−6.8%
1991	549	+0.0%
2001	547	−0.4%
2011	549	+0.4%
2021	532	−3.1%
Source: Censuses
