= George Black =

George Black may refer to:

- George Black (Australian politician) (1854–1936), New South Wales politician
- George Black (Canadian politician) (1873–1965), administrator and politician in Yukon, Canada
- George Black (New Zealand politician) (1903–1932), New Zealand Member of Parliament for Motueka
- George Black (RAF officer) (born 1932), British Royal Air Force pilot
- George Black (shipbuilder) (1778–1854), Canadian shipbuilder
- George Black (physician) (1854–1913), Scottish physician and writer
- George Black (producer) (1890–1945), British theatrical impresario
- George Fraser Black (1866–1948), Scottish-born American librarian, historian and linguist
- George G. Black, founder of the Black Manufacturing Company of Seattle
- George Montegu Black Sr. (1875–1959), grandfather of Conrad Black
- George Montegu Black II (1911–1976), Canadian businessman and father of Conrad Black
- George Murray Black (1874–1965), British-Australian graverobber
- George Robison Black (1835–1886), American politician and lawyer
- George Ruddell Black (1865–1942), Lord Mayor of Belfast
- George Black (author), Scottish author and journalist
