= Isaac Norris =

Isaac Norris may refer to:

- Isaac Norris (mayor) (1671–1735), merchant and early statesman in Pennsylvania and Mayor of Philadelphia
- Isaac Norris (statesman) (1701–1766), son of the above, also a merchant and statesman in Pennsylvania
- Isham F. Norris (1851–1928), known as Isaac Norris, Tennessee African-American politician during Reconstruction
