= Empire of Shadows =

Empire of Shadows may refer to:

== Fictional entities ==
- Empire of Shadows (Forgotten Realms), a fictional nation in the Forgotten Realms campaign setting
- Empire of Shadows, a fictional organization in DC Comics opposed to a version of the character of Doctor Fate

== Works of fiction and culture ==
- Empire of Shadows, a 2012 collection of poems by Hugh McFadden
- Empire of Shadows, a 2021 episode of the Torchwood audio drama series
- Empire of Shadows, a 2023 TV pilot starring Steve Brudniak
- Empire of Shadows – The Epic Story of Yellowstone, a 2012 book on the Yellowstone National Park by George Black
- Radical Regionalism: The Empire of Shadows, a 2006 art exhibition by Vernon Ah Kee and others
- Terra Umbra – Empire of Shadows, a website started 2009 on the invisible world by Richard Stanley

== See also ==
- In the Empire of Shadow
- Shadow Empire
