= St. Patrick's Roman Catholic Church (Racine, Wisconsin) =

Historic church in Wisconsin, United States

- U.S. National Register of Historic Places
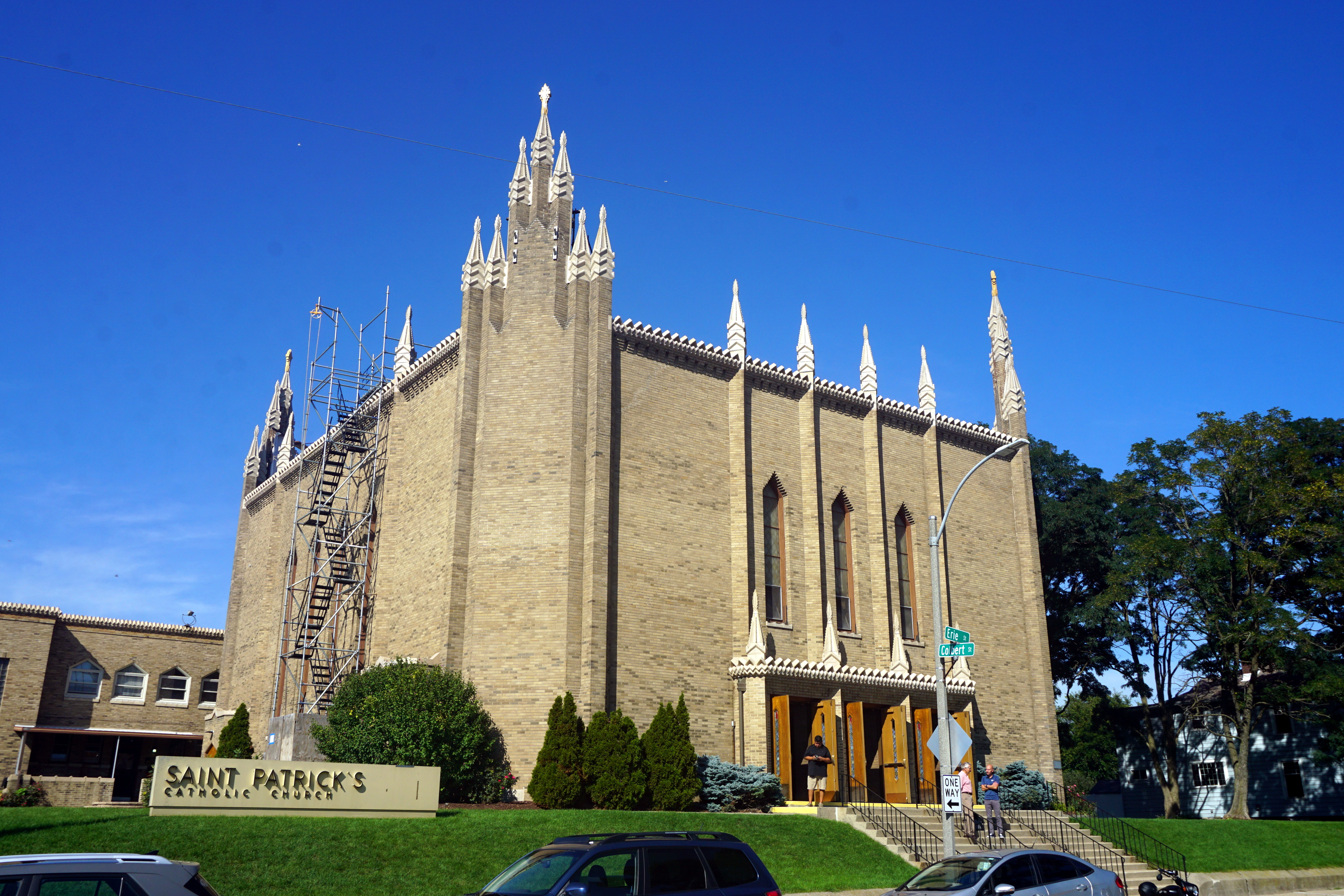
- Location: 1100 Erie St. Racine, Wisconsin
- Coordinates: 42.73453°N 87.78731°W
- Architect: Barry Byrne
- Architectural style: eclectic
- NRHP reference No.: 79000106
- Added to NRHP: July 5, 1979

St. Patrick's Roman Catholic Church is a parish of the Roman Catholic Church in Racine, Wisconsin. It is noted for its historic parish church built in 1925 and added to the National Register of Historic Places in 1979 for its architectural significance.

Prior to 1925, St. Patrick's congregation worshiped in a Greek Revival building near the current church. In 1923 the congregation had Barry Byrne of Chicago design a new building. Byrne had worked for Frank Lloyd Wright and by this time specialized in designing church buildings and schools - this being his second church.

== Architecture ==
The 1924 building of St. Patrick's features a nearly square floor plan, with its corners cut off by short angled walls topped with triangular spires reaching skyward. The walls are made of wire-cut brick and are adorned with tall lancet windows. The main entrance is three equal doors side by side, topped with terracotta ornament and small spires, with three windows above. In the design Byrne mixes Neogothic style (the emphasis on the vertical and the lancet windows) with Art Deco (the areas of wall space) with a modern feel that could be Prairie School influence.

Inside the front entrance is a wooden narthex which supports an organ balcony. Stained-glass windows depict Old Testament prophets, the evangelists, and St. Patrick. The Stations of the Cross and Mary and Joseph appear in bas-relief panels. Alphonzo Ianelli, who had also worked with Frank Lloyd Wright, designed many of these interior ornaments.

The design of the building is fresh. Byrne's plans were exhibited at the Academy of Fine Arts in Berlin where they were influential, and Byrne used a similar design for the Church of Christ the King in Tulsa in 1926.

== See also ==
- National Register of Historic Places listings in Racine County, Wisconsin
