= Barry Byrne =

American architect (1883–1967)

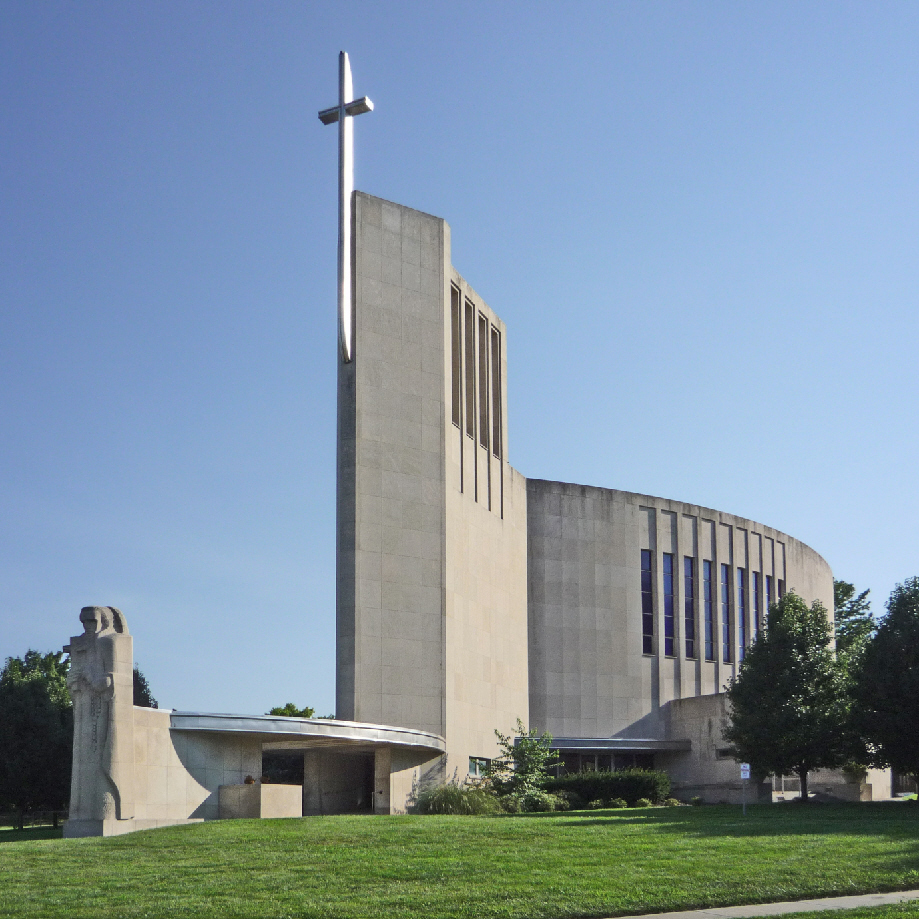
Church of Saint Francis Xavier, Kansas City, Missouri by Barry Byrne (1949), called the "fish church" because of its plan, with statuary by Alfonso Iannelli and Stations of the Cross by Annette Cremin Byrne; recipient of the American Institute of Architects retrospective award for design excellence in 1987

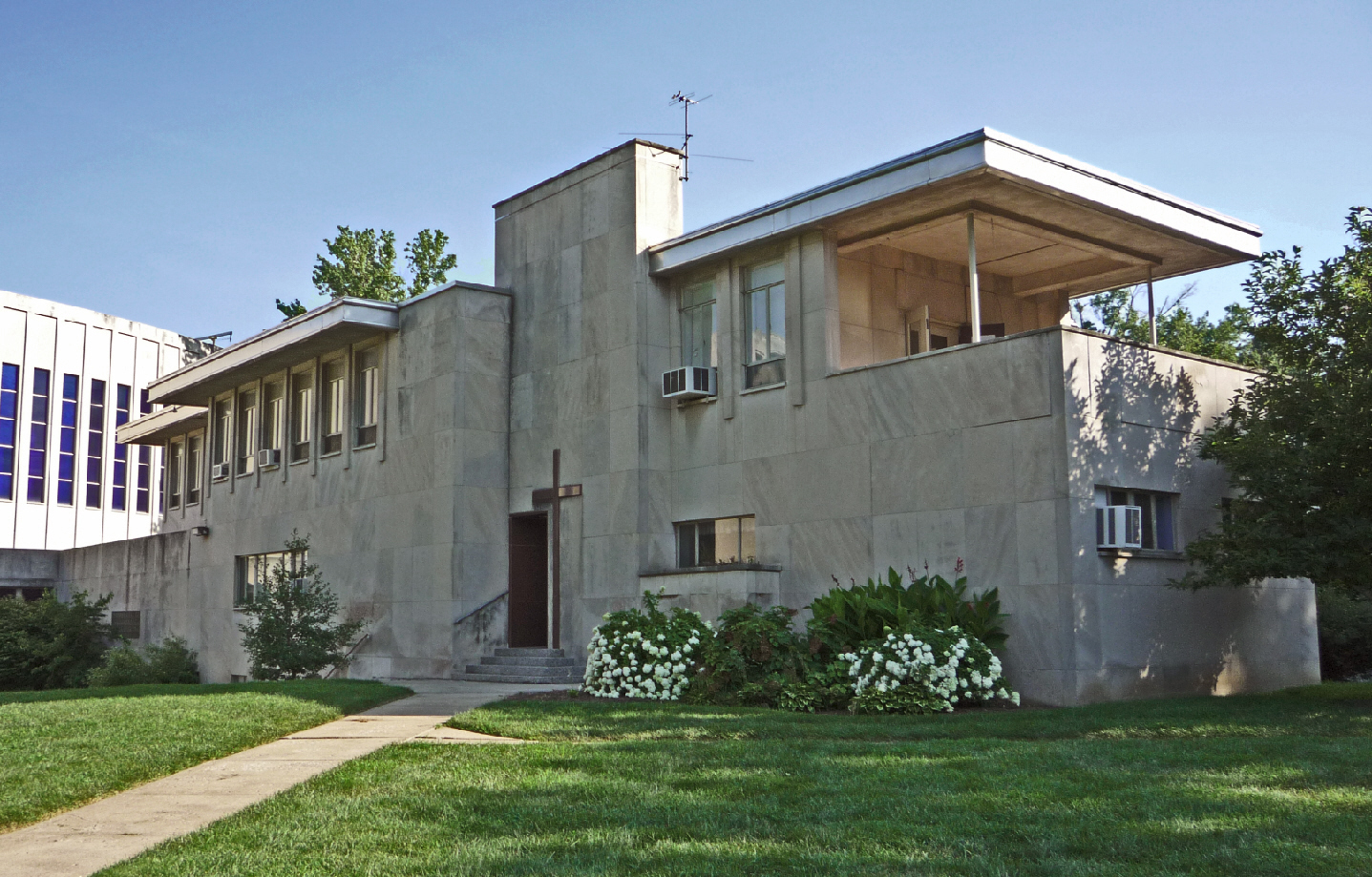
Church of Saint Francis Xavier, Parish Office, Kansas City, Missouri

Francis Barry Byrne (December 19, 1883 – December 18, 1967) was a member of the group of architects known as the Prairie School. After the demise of the Prairie School, about 1914 to 1916, Byrne continued as a successful architect by developing his own style.

== Biography ==
Byrne was born and raised in Chicago. After seeing a Chicago Architectural Club exhibit in 1902, he sought employment with Frank Lloyd Wright and secured an apprentice position although he was untrained in architecture. As Wright's son, John, relates:

William Drummond, Francis Barry Byrne, Walter Burley Griffin, Albert McArthur (Albert Chase McArthur), Marion Mahony, Isabel Roberts and George Willis were the draftsmen. They included five men and two women. They wore flowing ties, and smocks suitable to the realm. The men wore their hair like Papa, all except Albert, he didn’t have enough hair. They worshiped Papa! Papa liked them! I know that each one of them was then making valuable contributions to the pioneering of the modern American architecture for which my father gets the full glory, headaches and recognition today!

After working for Wright in his Oak Park, Illinois studio between 1902 and 1907, Byrne worked briefly at other Chicago firms. He moved to Seattle in winter 1908 to 1909 to join Andrew Willatzen who had been a fellow employee at Wright's office. They formed the firm Willatzen & Byrne and, over the next several years, produced a series of residential designs in the Prairie School style.

After the Willatzen & Byrne partnership dissolved in 1913, Willatzen remained in Seattle but Byrne moved to southern California where he lived briefly with Wright's sons Lloyd Wright and John Lloyd Wright. In 1914, he returned to Chicago at first to manage, then, take over the practice of Walter Burley Griffin who had moved to Australia to develop plans for its new capital city, Canberra.

By 1917, Byrne was practicing under his own name. He briefly served in World War I, then returned to Chicago. Byrne's style developed independently of Wright and the Prairie School as he moved toward greater simplification of form. Annette Cremin became Byrne's wife in 1926, and they had three children: Ann, Cathleen and Patrick. As an artist, Annette influenced his work, drawing renderings of his architectural designs, and on occasion, contributing interior color patterns and decoration for his buildings and churches. During the depression when there was no demand for his services, she supported the family.

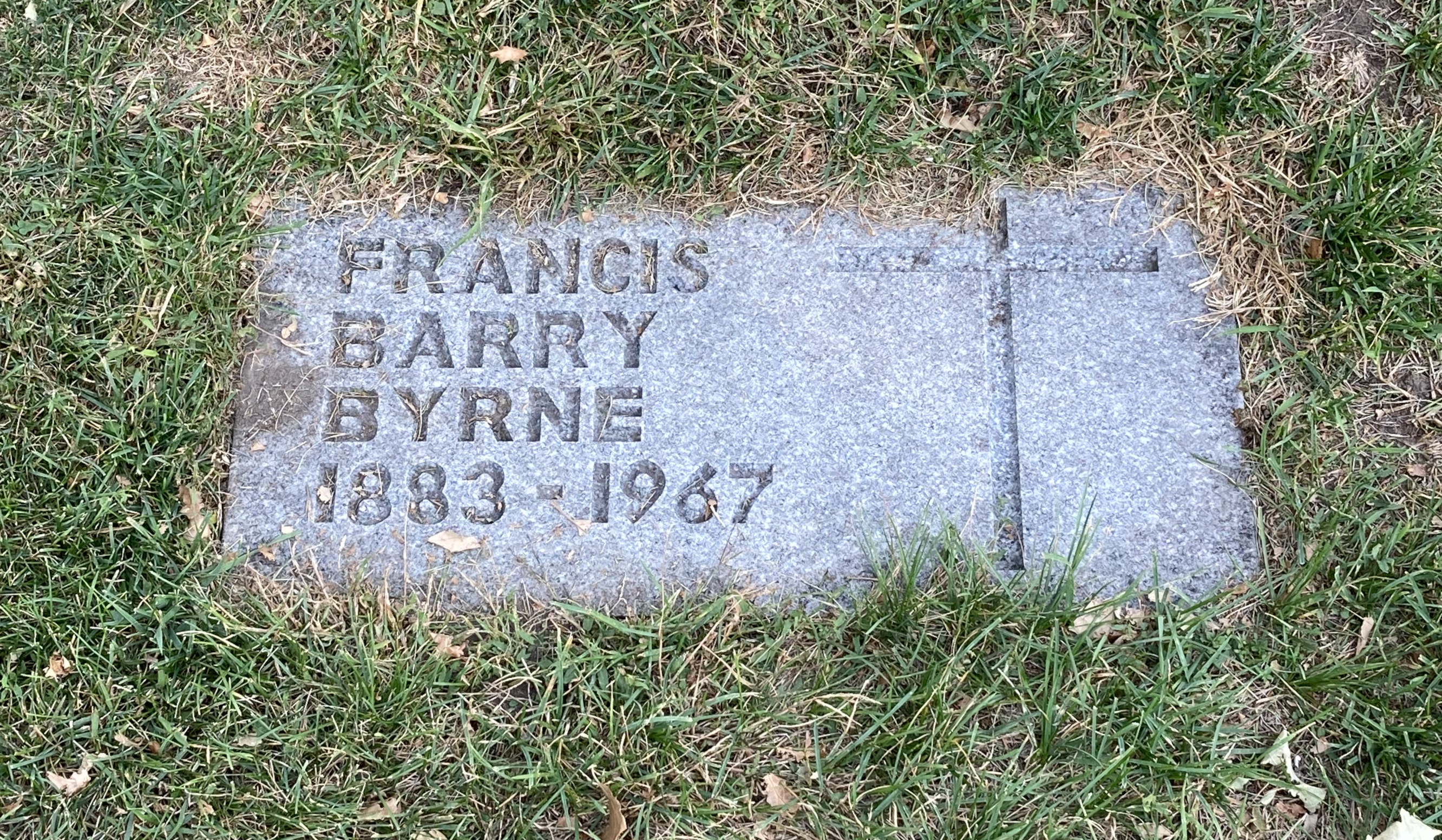
Byrne's grave at Calvary Cemetery

During the 1920s, some of Byrne's work contained elements of Expressionism. He became successful as a designer of ecclesiastical and educational buildings for the Roman Catholic Church, for whom he later created three of his most important works: Church of Christ the King in Turners Cross, Cork, Ireland (1931), Church of St. Francis Xavier in Kansas City, Missouri (1949), and St. Benedict's Abbey in Atchison, Kansas (1951–1957).

In the 1930s, Byrne moved to New York, but after 1945 returned to Chicago. Byrne partially retired about 1953, but continued to accept commissions until his death.

He died on the eve of his 84th birthday after being struck crossing the street to attend Mass with his wife by an automobile driven by retired president of the American League Will Harridge. He is buried at Calvary Cemetery in Evanston, Illinois. Annette Cremin Byrne died in 1990, aged 92.

Archival materials are held by the Ryerson & Burnham Libraries in the Art Institute of Chicago.

== Selected works ==
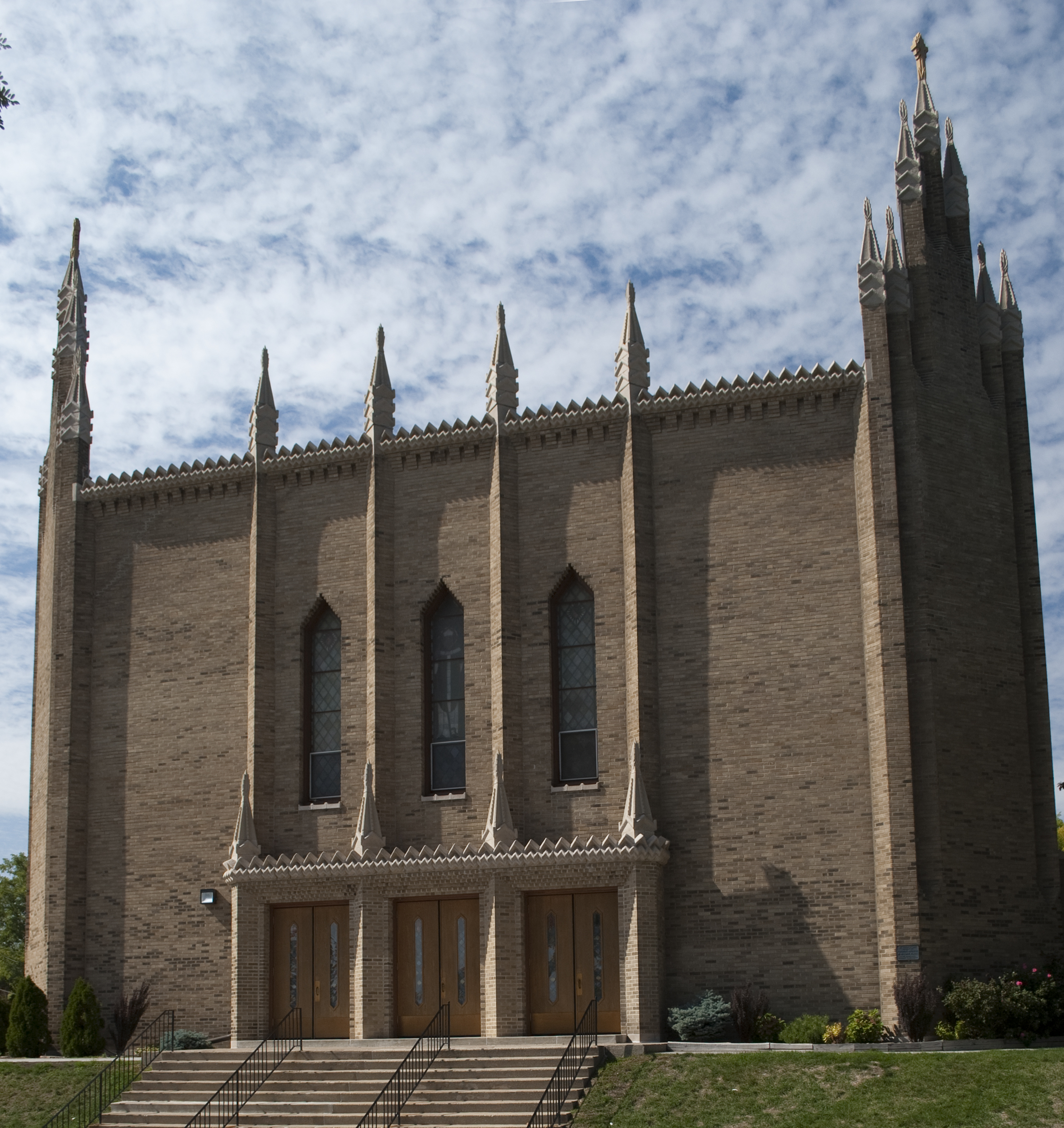
St. Patrick's Roman Catholic Church, Racine, Wisconsin (1924)

- Nelson, Tagholm and Jensen Building, Seattle, Washington (1909) with Andrew Willatzen
- Charles H. Clarke House, Seattle, Washington (1909) with Andrew Willatzen
- Frederick Handschy House Seattle, Washington (1910) with Andrew Willatzen
- Our Lady of Good Help Catholic Church, Hoquiam, Washington (1910) with Andrew Willatzen
- George Matzen House, Seattle, Washington (1910), with Andrew Willatzen
- Oscar E. Maurer House, Seattle, Washington (1910) with Andrew Willatzen
- Andrew S. Kerry House, Seattle, Washington (1910–11) with Andrew Willatzen
- George E. Felmlay House, Seattle, Washington (1911) with Andrew Willatzen
- John T. McVay House, Seattle, Washington (1911) with Andrew Willatzen
- Carleton Huiscamp House, Seattle, Washington (1912) with Andrew Willatzen
- George Bellman House, Seattle, Washington (1912) with Andrew Willatzen
- L. George Hagar House, Seattle, Washington (1913) with Andrew Willatzen
- Sam Schneider House, Mason City, Iowa (1914), attributed (original commission to Walter Burley Griffin)
- J.B. Franke House, Fort Wayne, Indiana (1914)
- Hugh Gilmore House, Mason City, Iowa (1915)
- Dr. James Frederic Clarke House, Fairfield, Iowa (1915)
- John Travis Kenna Apartments, Chicago, Illinois (1916)
- C.M. Rich House, Keokuk, Iowa (1916)
- Saint Francis Xavier School, Wilmette, Illinois (1916)
- Old Chemistry Hall, University of New Mexico, Albuquerque, New Mexico (1916)
- John Valentine House (now Sigma Tau Gamma fraternity house, Ball State University), Muncie, Indiana (1917)
- William F. Temple House remodeling, Kenilworth, Illinois (1917), with Alfonso Iannelli
- Immaculata High School and Convent Buildings, Chicago (1922), historic landmark
- St. Francis Xavier High School, Wilmette, Illinois (1922)
- Church of St. Thomas the Apostle, Chicago, Illinois (1922)
- All Saints Cemetery, Des Plaines, Illinois (1923)
- St. Catherine's High School, Racine, Wisconsin (1923)
- St. Patrick's Roman Catholic Church, Racine, Wisconsin (1924)
- Church of Christ the King, Tulsa, Oklahoma (1926)
- Church of Christ the King, Parish of Turners Cross, Cork, Ireland (1931), sculpture by John Storrs
- Church of SS. Peter & Paul, Pierre, South Dakota (1941)
- Church of St. Francis Xavier, Kansas City, Missouri (1949), with Joseph B Shaughnessy Sr. sculptures by Alfonso Iannelli
- St. Columba Church, St. Paul, Minnesota (1949)
- St. Benedict's Abbey Church, Atchison, Kansas (1951–1957)
- Church of St. Patrick, London, Ontario (1952)
- Holy Redeemer College (now Académie Sainte-Cécile), Windsor, Ontario (1957)
- St. Procopius College (now Benedictine University), Lisle, Illinois (1962)
