= Black Manufacturing Company =

Former clothing manufacturer

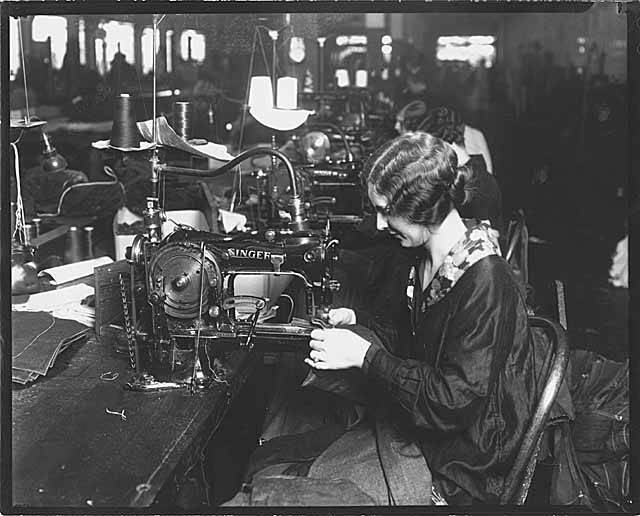
Woman using an industrial Singer sewing machine at Black Manufacturing Co, Seattle, ca 1927

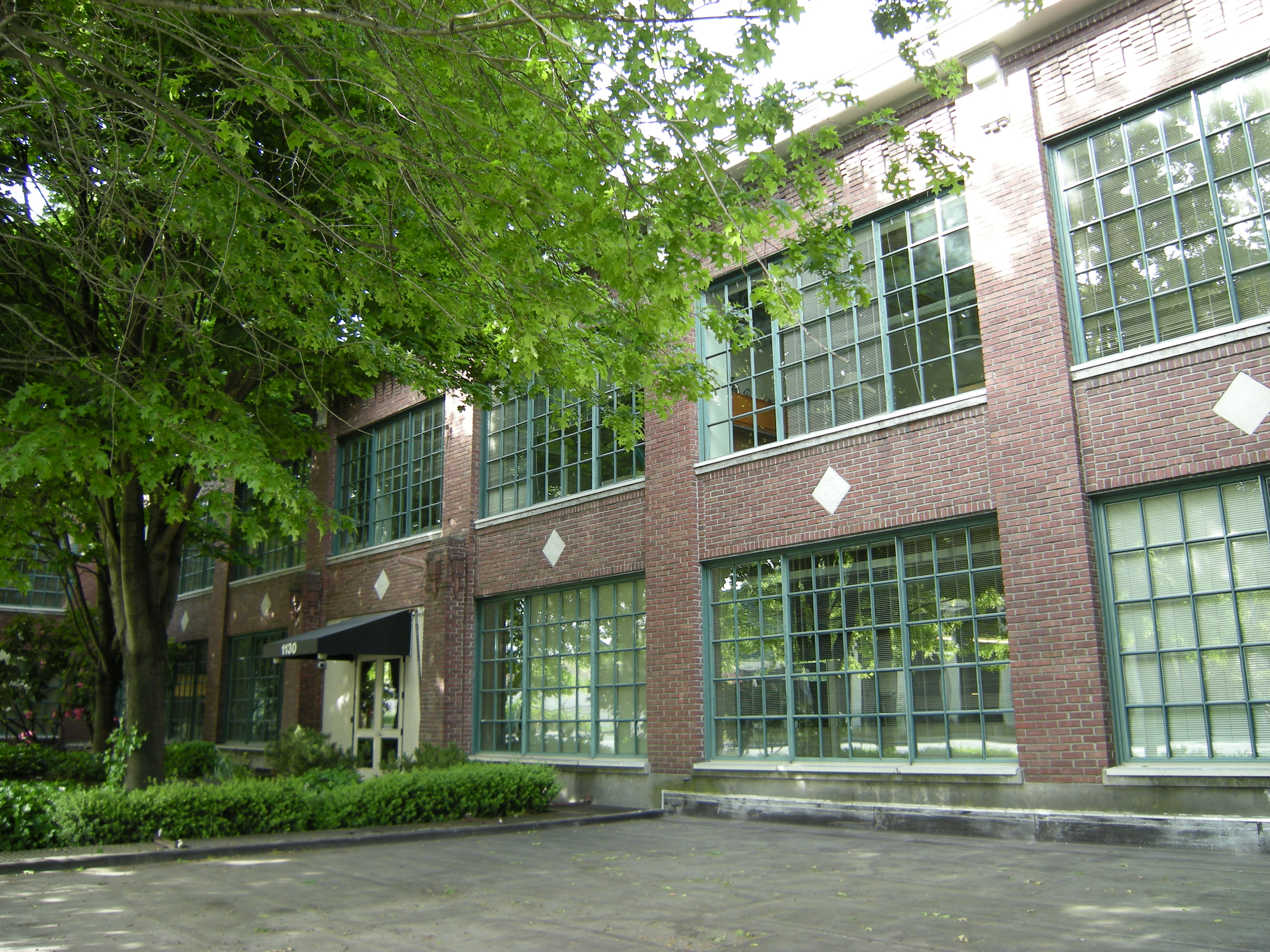
The building in 2008

The Black Manufacturing Company was a clothing manufacturer that produced the Black Bear brand of overalls as well as mackinaws and overcoats; George G. Black was the proprietor. In 1914, Black had a building designed by Andrew Willatzen built for the company in Seattle. The business continued until 1982. The company's building is an official Seattle landmark and has been used by Dairygold.

Isham F. Norris worked at the company.

Signage for the company featured the slogan "Black Bear Means Long Wear". A 1941 catalog survives.

The Black Bear brand has been relaunched by Josh Sirlin.
