= Anne Nelson =

American journalist (born 1954)

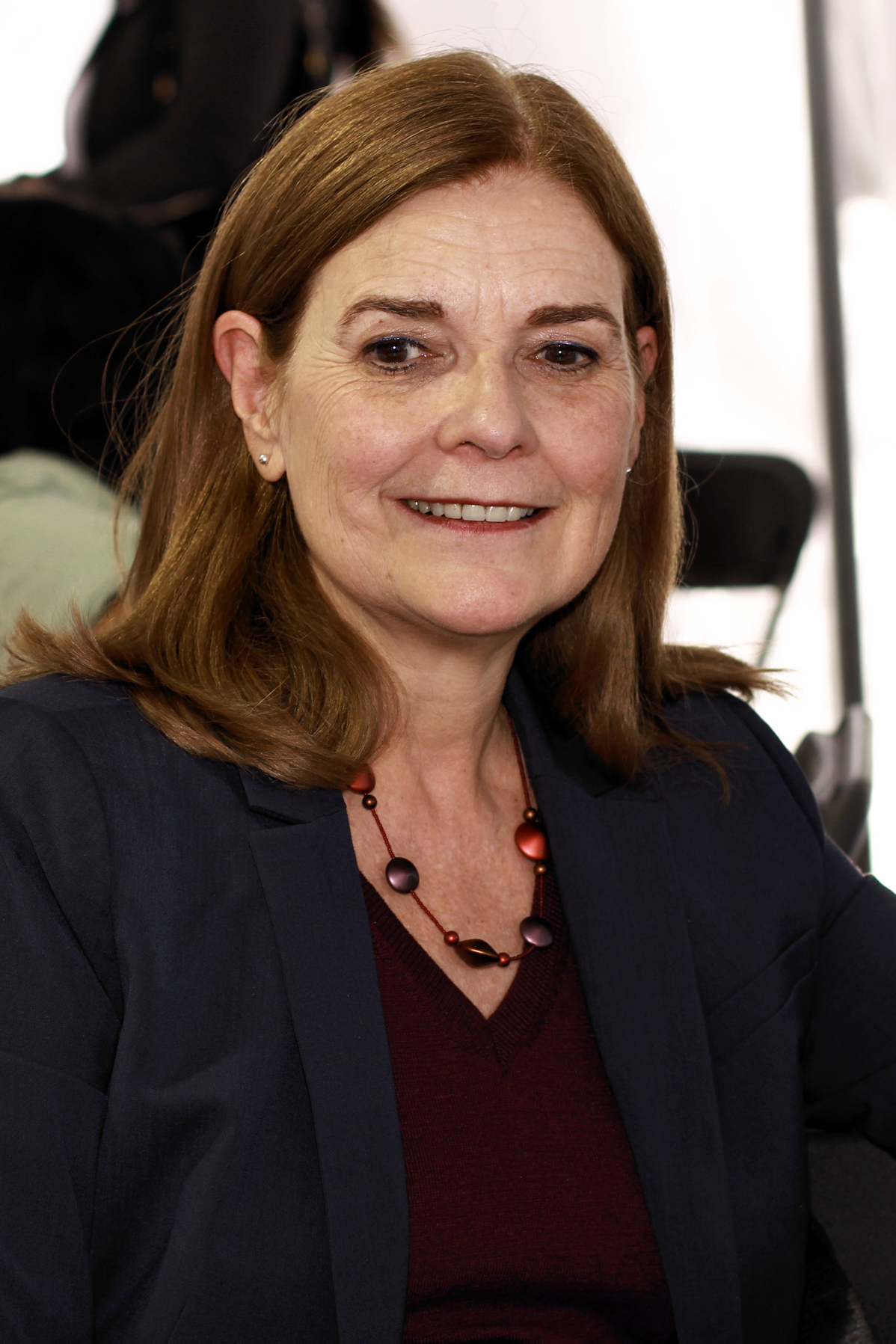
- Nelson at the 2019 Texas Book Festival
- Born: 1954 (age 71–72); Fort Sill, Oklahoma
- Education: Yale University
- Writing career
- Subjects: History; current events
- Notable works: Red Orchestra: The Story of the Berlin Underground and the Circle of Friends Who Resisted Hitler; The Guys
- Website: anne-nelson.com

Anne Nelson (born 1954) is an American journalist, author, playwright, and professor.

== Early life and education ==
Anne Nelson was born in Fort Sill, Oklahoma in 1954, and spent her childhood in Lincoln, Nebraska. She graduated from Yale University in 1976.

== Career ==
From 1980 to 1983, Nelson served as a war correspondent in El Salvador and Guatemala.

In 1989, she was given a Livingston Award for Excellence in International Reporting for the piece "In the Grotto of the Pink Sisters" for Mother Jones.

In 2005, she received a Guggenheim Fellowship in Nonfiction and German and East European History for her research for the book Red Orchestra.

Nelson teaches at the School of International and Public Affairs at Columbia University.

Nelson's 2019 book Shadow Network: Media, Money, and the Secret Hub of the Radical Right deals with the political influence of groups including the right wing Council for National Policy.

In 2024, she was named to the Oklahoma Journalism Hall of Fame.

== Personal life ==
Nelson is married to journalist and author George Black. Together they have two children.

== Bibliography ==
- Murder Under Two Flags: The US, Puerto Rico, and the Cerro Maravilla Cover-up; New York : Ticknor & Fields, 1986. ISBN 9780899193717
- The Guys: A Play. New York : Random House, 2002. ISBN 9780812967296
- Red Orchestra: The Story of the Berlin Underground and the Circle of Friends Who Resisted Hitler. New York: Random House, 2009. ISBN 9781400060009 OCLC 229467500
- Suzanne's Children New York : Simon & Schuster, 2017. ISBN 9781501105333
- Shadow Network: Media, Money, and the Secret Hub of the Radical Right, New York : Bloomsbury Publishing, 2019. ISBN 9781635573190
