= St. Columba Church (Saint Paul, Minnesota) =

Coordinates: 44°57′38″N 93°9′21″W

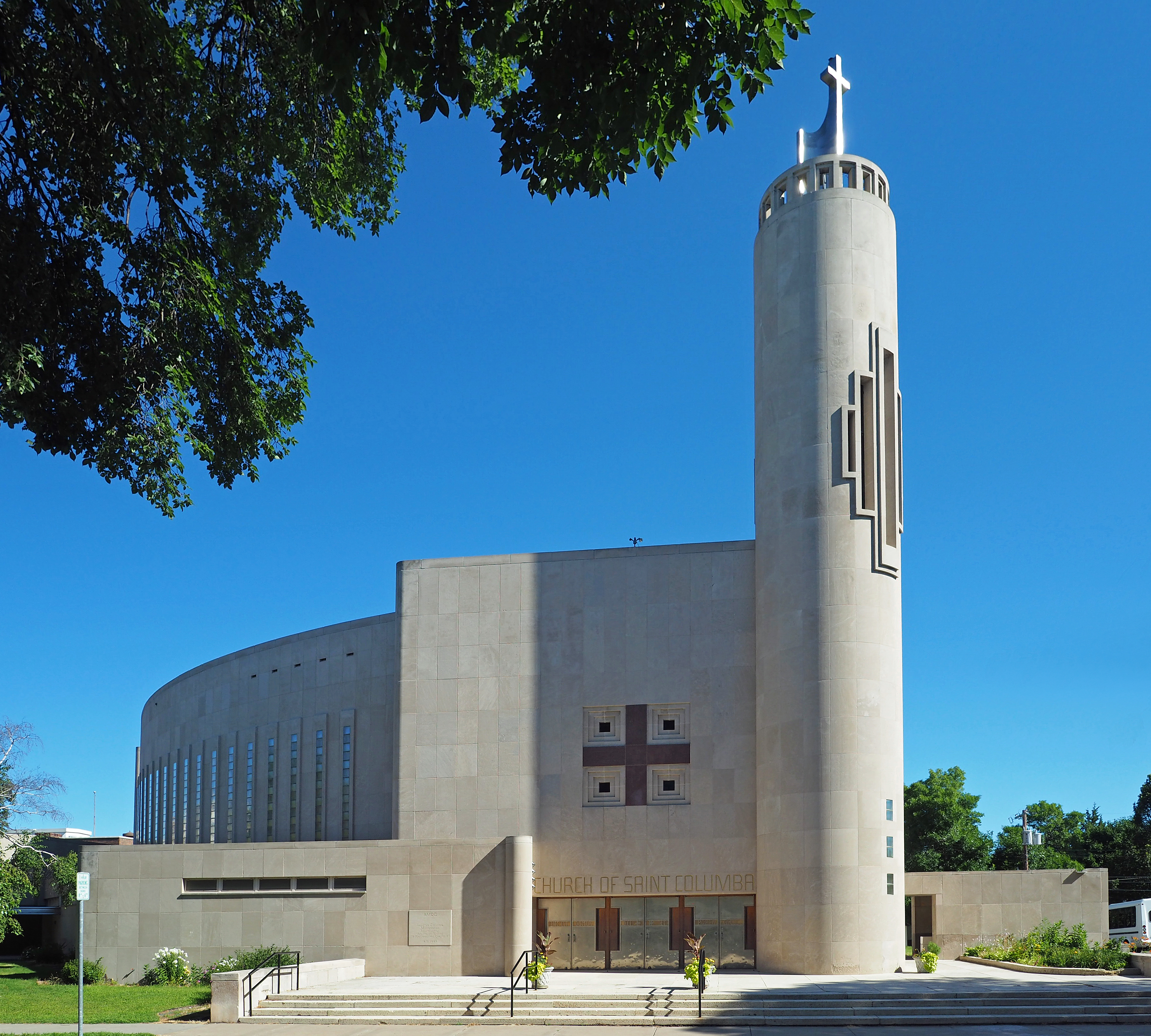
- St. Columba Church viewed from the south

- Location: 1327 Lafond Avenue, Saint Paul, Minnesota
- Country: United States
- Denomination: Roman Catholic
- Website: www.stcolumba.org

The Church of St. Columba is a Roman Catholic church in Saint Paul, Minnesota, United States. The parish was formed in the Hamline-Midway neighborhood in 1915. After the mid-twentieth century baby boom, the church was expanding and needed a new building. Then-pastor Michael Casey contracted with architect Barry Byrne to design and construct the building. Byrne was based in Chicago and his formal schooling ended in the Ninth Grade. Byrne worked under Frank Lloyd Wright and was involved with the Prairie School of architecture before later turned towards Expressionist architecture. Byrne designed the building later in his career.

The 1949 church is very similar in design to St. Francis Xavier Church in Kansas City, Missouri, that was also designed by Byrne. The pastor Michael Casey had the bell tower built to look like an Irish round tower. The interior of the church is built from two overlapping circles. This creates an elliptical interior and an overhead profile that resembles a fish. The fish is one of the earliest symbols of Christianity and the construction of the shape of the church was undoubtedly intentional. The amount of light available on the inside of the building is worth mentioning. There are more than 24 slit like clerestory windows that let natural light in. The interior lightness contrasts with the heavy concrete exterior. The interior of the church features an under lit cove close to the ceiling. Twin Cities architecture critic Larry Millett views the altar as being small for the large interior of the building. Vincent Michael also believes that the altar is undersized compared to the size of the nave.

Unlike St. Francis Xavier the entrance doors are made of metal instead of polished glass. Michael Vincent believes it still leaves the impression of emptiness underneath the bell tower. To create the internal shape the external walls are curved. They are constructed of limestone. There is a large amount of concrete and has been described as a "tour de force" of concrete. Several elements of the church are viewed as unique due to their combination. Millett sees the slots in the bell tower, the granite crosses embedded in the exterior walls and the metal on the entrance doors as a special grouping.

Millett describes the building as a "high point in modern church architecture in the Twin Cities" and notes it as being removed from many religious and architectural norms. Other critiques note it as having shapes and orders that defy orthodox expectations.

== School ==
The parish had an elementary school for 82 years until it was closed in 2004 due to a decline in enrollment and a large amount of debt.

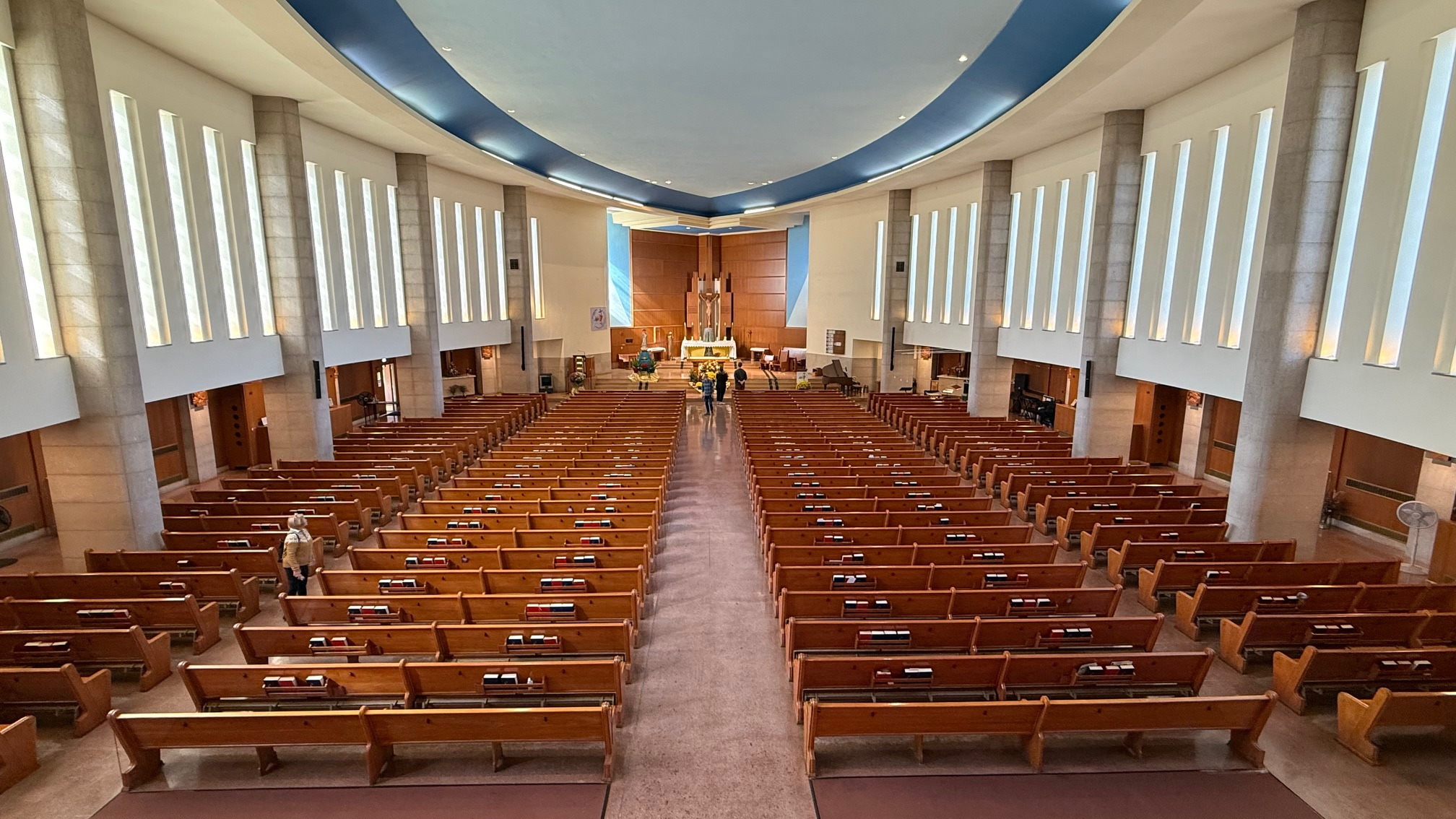
Sanctuary
