= Andrew Willatsen =

German-born American architect

Andrew Christian Peter Willatzen
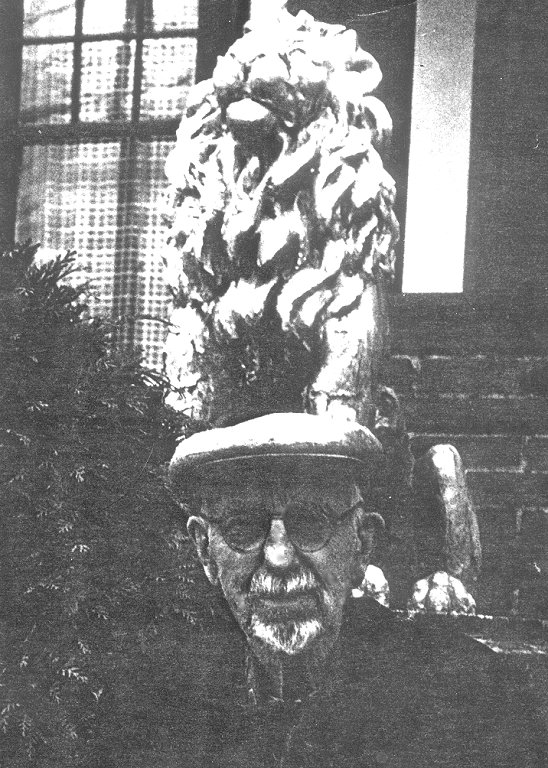
- Andrew Willatsen in front of his Seattle home, 1973
- Born: October 8, 1876; Schleswig-Holstein
- Died: July 28, 1974 (aged 97)
- Occupation: Architect

Andrew Willatsen (8 October 1876 – 25 July 1974) was an architect chiefly remembered for bringing the influence of Frank Lloyd Wright and the Prairie School to the Pacific Northwest.

== Early life and emigration ==
Andrew Christian Peter Willatzen was born in Schleswig-Holstein, northern Germany in 1876 and came to the United States in 1900. Born with the last name Willatzen, he changed the spelling to Willatsen c. 1918 due to anti-German sentiment during World War I. This may also explain the fact that later he always identified with the Danish in his background.

== Career ==
He first worked as a carpenter, then as a draftsman, and arrived at Frank Lloyd Wright's Studio in Oak Park, Illinois in 1902 or 1903. The Studio was just entering its most creative period, and Willatzen soon became a valued apprentice. He later claimed "full responsibility" for Wright's 1905 remodeling of the lobbies of Chicago's Rookery Building, and said that "The Boss" accepted his design for the fence of the Larkin Administration Building (Buffalo, NY, 1907, destroyed) without changes. Willatzen also worked on the interiors of the Martin House in Buffalo and was hired by the Martins for a 1920 remodel, while Wright was away in Japan. He also worked for the Chicago firms of Spencer and Powers and Pond and Pond.

By 1907, Willatzen had about three years experience off and on with Wright. That year he moved to Spokane, Washington, secured a position with the prestigious firm of Cutter & Malmgren, and was soon sent to head the Seattle office and supervise the construction of the Seattle Golf & Country Club (1908) at The Highlands, north of the city.

In 1909, Willatzen formed a partnership with Francis Barry Byrne (1883–1967), whom he had known at Wright's office. The new firm quickly began a series of homes adapting Wright's principles to the Northwest environment. The Charles E. Clarke House (1909) at The Highlands, and the Frederick Handschy House (1910) at 2433 9th Ave. W., Seattle, are large bungalows which draw on Wright's early gable-roofed Prairie houses, and also show influences from other Prairie School architects such as Walter Burley Griffin. The George Matzen House (1910) at 320 Kinnear Place, Seattle, is hipped-roofed, stuccoed, with a stunted cruciform plan typical of the Prairie style confined by a narrow, sloping site. The interlocking spaces of the interior and the custom designed leaded glass, light fixtures and furniture combined to give the Matzen House perhaps the finest of Willatzen and Byrne's executed interiors. The proposal for the A.S. Kerry Mansion (1910) at The Highlands (constructed 1911 in an abbreviated form), reflected Wright's long, low, more expansive designs. Although lacking the grand living and dining spaces of the original project, this house remains an impressive design; it is perhaps the best known of Willatzen and Byrne's work and is sometimes mistakenly attributed to Frank Lloyd Wright. The Oscar E. Maurer House (1910) at 2715 Belvidere, Seattle, the John T. McVay House (1911) at 1025 Belmont Place, Seattle, the George Bellman House (1912) at 2021 E. Lynn, Seattle, and the L. George Hagar House (1913) at 303 W. Prospect, Seattle, (also scaled down from a grander first proposal) are typical of the firm's handling of more modest homes.

Willatzen and Byrne also designed in the Craftsman mode and various period revival styles. Most significant of these is the Stickleyesque George E. Felmlay House (1911) at 6975 47th Ave. S.W., Seattle, and the Carleton Huiscamp House at The Highlands (1912), the firm's most important eclectic work. This imposing Dutch Colonial's strong lines and fine detailing show that the partners were comfortable with period revival design. Later additions have unfortunately detracted from the house's original appearance. The firm also produced numerous business, commercial, and industrial structures, including their first project, the many oriel-windowed Nelson, Tagholm and Jensen Building (Hotel Louisa) at King Street & 7th Ave. S., Seattle, (1909).

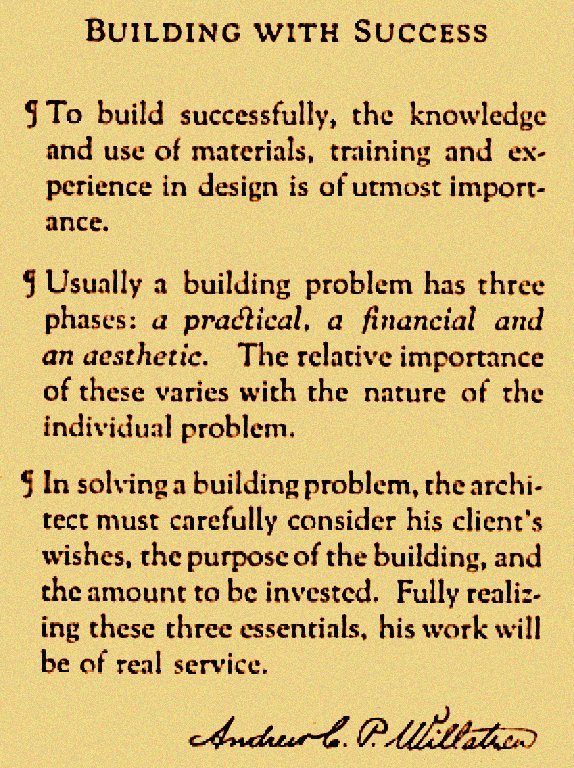
Andrew Willatzen's Professional Creed, 1910s

Barry Byrne left Seattle early in 1913, moving first to California and eventually returning to the Midwest. Byrne had a long and celebrated career, mainly in the designing of Catholic churches. Our Lady of Good Help (1910) in Hoquiam, Washington, appears to be the first of this line.

In solo practice, Willatsen continued to design homes reflecting the Prairie idiom, including his most noted solo work, the Joseph Black House (1914) at 222 W. Highland Dr., Seattle, which illustrated the Prairie Style adapted to a more conventional, central hall type plan. The Black House was the prototype for several other Willatsen designs over the following decade, but its sweeping gable roof and continuous band of second floor windows set it apart from the others. The curved entrance canopy became a sort of Willatsen trademark, gracing numerous homes of both Prairie and Period design, and one church. This magnificent home was illegally destroyed over the Martin Luther King holiday weekend in 2004. The William E. Robinson House (1913) at 2011 11th Ave. E., Seattle, and the E.E. Vogue House (1918–19) at 1016 E. Lynn St., Seattle, are good examples of his approach to more modest homes, while the Gustav V. Rasmussen House (1921–25) at 3211 Cascadia Ave., Seattle, and Willatsen's favorite project, the O.L. Martin House (1928) at 3722 E. Prospect, Seattle, illustrate his handling of larger budget residences.

Traditional homes also remained in his repertoire. Two 1914 commissions reflected the Tudor style. The Frederick Hurlbut House at 1015 E. Prospect, Seattle, is a very personal design with Prairie overtones. Willatsen's typical attention to detail, such as the type of hardware used, is readily apparent in this house. The Jeremiah Neterer House at 2702 Broadway E., Seattle, is a more academic work. The John H. Carter House (1916) at 1615 36th Ave., Seattle, and the Fred Burwell House (1925) at 425 35th Ave., Seattle, illustrate the Classical and Federal revival styles respectively. Besides custom homes, Willatsen produced designs for builders. A group of homes for Carl Hedeen at 1711, 1717, and 1809 NE. 63rd St. and 1738 Naomi Place, all in Seattle, (1915–17) have been identified.

After the decline in the popularity of the Prairie School, Willatsen worked in a wide variety of styles, designing stores, churches, and many other types of structures. From 1915 to the 1960s, he was the architect for general alterations to the Seattle Pike Place Market. The simplicity and common sense of his work won many loyal customers who turned repeatedly to him for their architectural needs until his retirement in the late 1940s. He continued to work occasionally in his retirement, mainly for friends and old clients. Two modest standouts from this period are the 1955 Church & North Office at 3701 SW Alaska St., Seattle, and the Richard Desimone House of 1959 at 2605 SW 170th St. in Normandy Park, Washington, a Midwest-style rambler in Roman brick.

Andrew Willatsen died in Seattle in 1974 at the age of 97. His papers, drawings, and the furniture and art glass windows from the 1915 remodeling of his Boston Block office were acquired from Willatsen by the University of Washington shortly before his death.

The windows are in the Architectural Library in Gould Hall. The table and chairs are in the University's Branch Office at the Palazzo Pio, Rome, Italy. A bookcase with leaded glass doors is in the office of the Dean of Architecture in Gould Hall. These are the only examples of Willatsen's furniture known to still exist.

Willatsen was a major contributor to the development of progressive architecture in the Northwest, and he, along with Byrne, must be credited with bringing the Prairie Style to Seattle over 30 years before Wright's first Northwest commission.

== Bibliographical note ==
His surviving drawings, some notebooks, papers, and a transcription of his personal project ledger are in the Special Collections and Manuscript Sections of The University of Washington Libraries. A copy is available in the University Architecture Library in Gould Hall. Much work is also documented in contemporary periodicals such as Pacific Builder & Engineer, Pacific Coast Architect, and Bungalow Magazine. Early photos of the Clarke and Kerry Houses can be found in Homes and Gardens of the Pacific Coast (Frank Calvert; Editor, 1913) reprinted by the Queen Anne Historical Society, Seattle, (1988).

== Work ==
- Black Manufacturing Company building (1914), Seattle

== Gallery ==
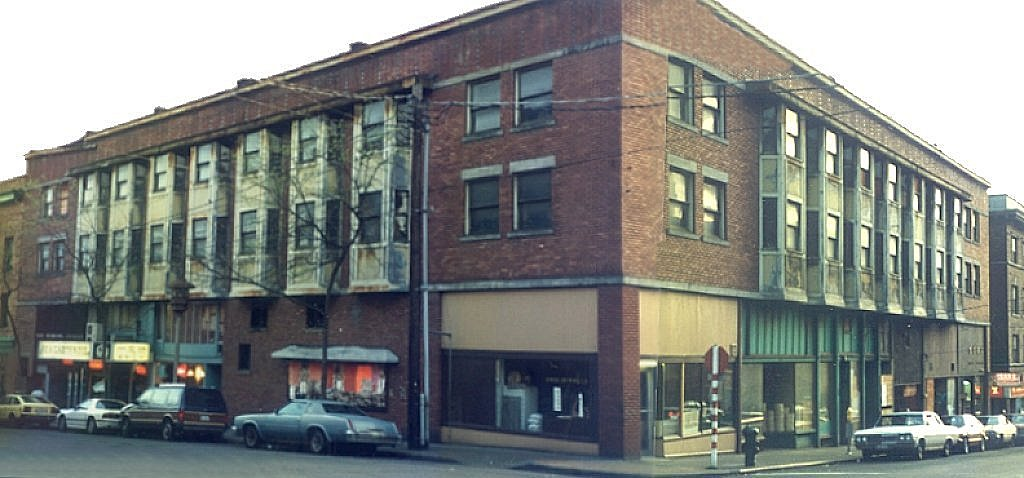
Willatzen & Byrne, Nelson, Tagholm & Jensen Building, 1909

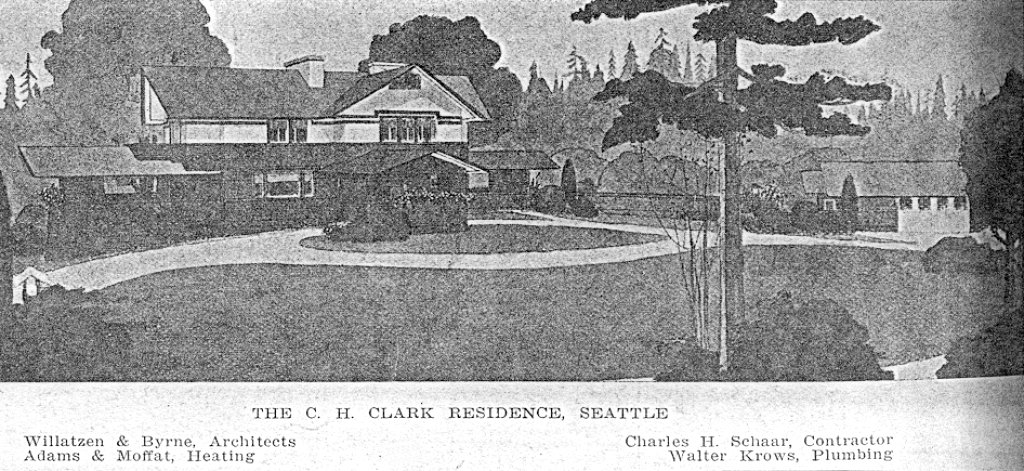
Willatzen & Byrne, Charles Clarke House, 1909

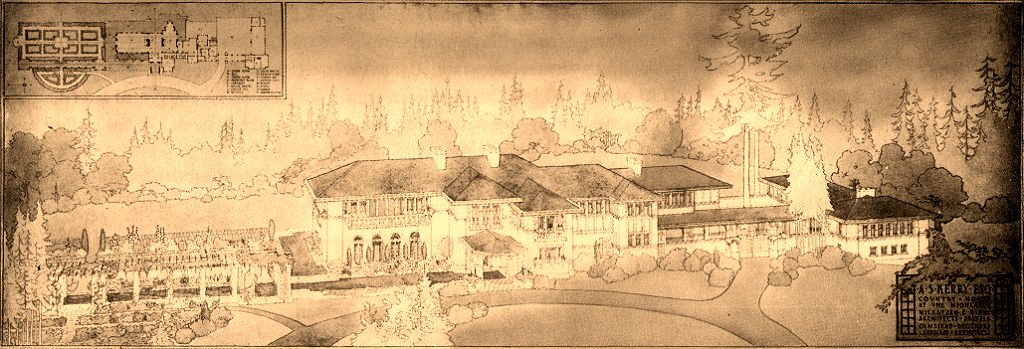
Willatzen & Byrne, A. S. Kerry House Project, 1910

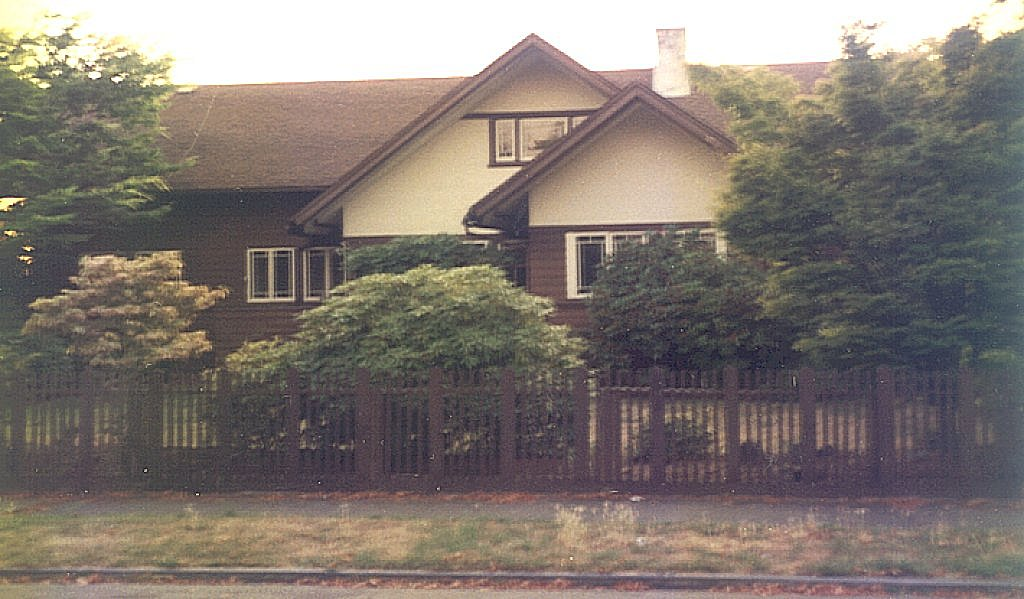
Willatzen & Byrne, Frederick Handschy House, 1910

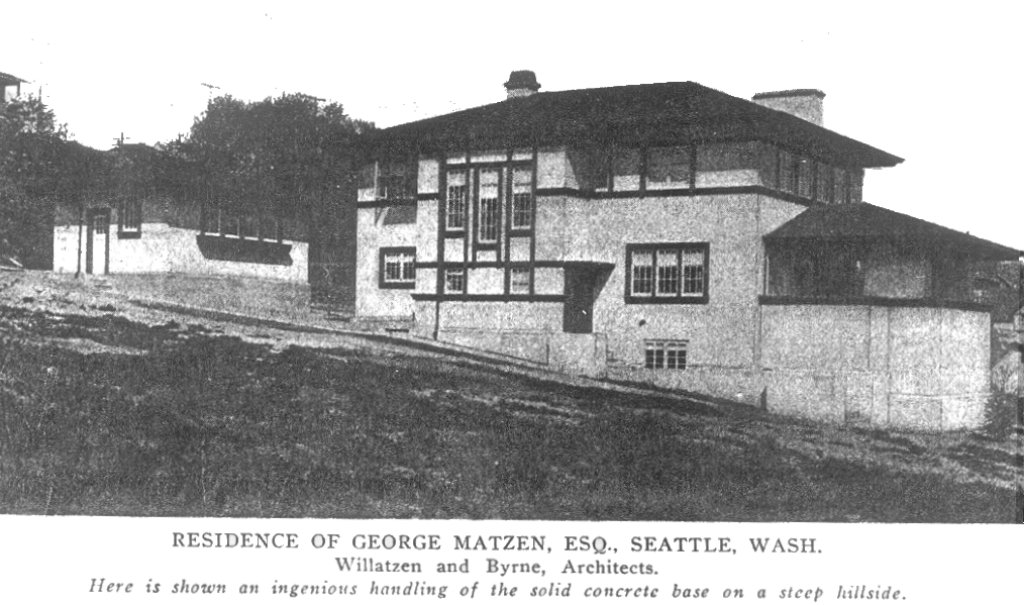
Willatzen & Byrne, George Matzen House, 1910

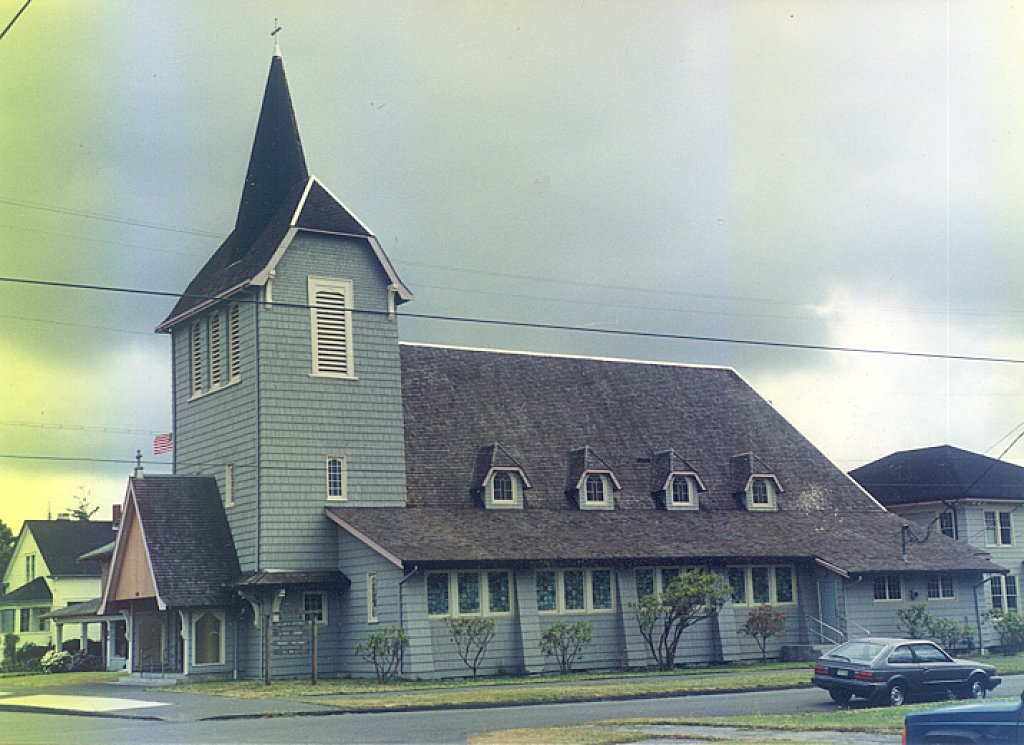
Willatzen & Byrne, Our Lady of Good Help Catholic Church, 1910

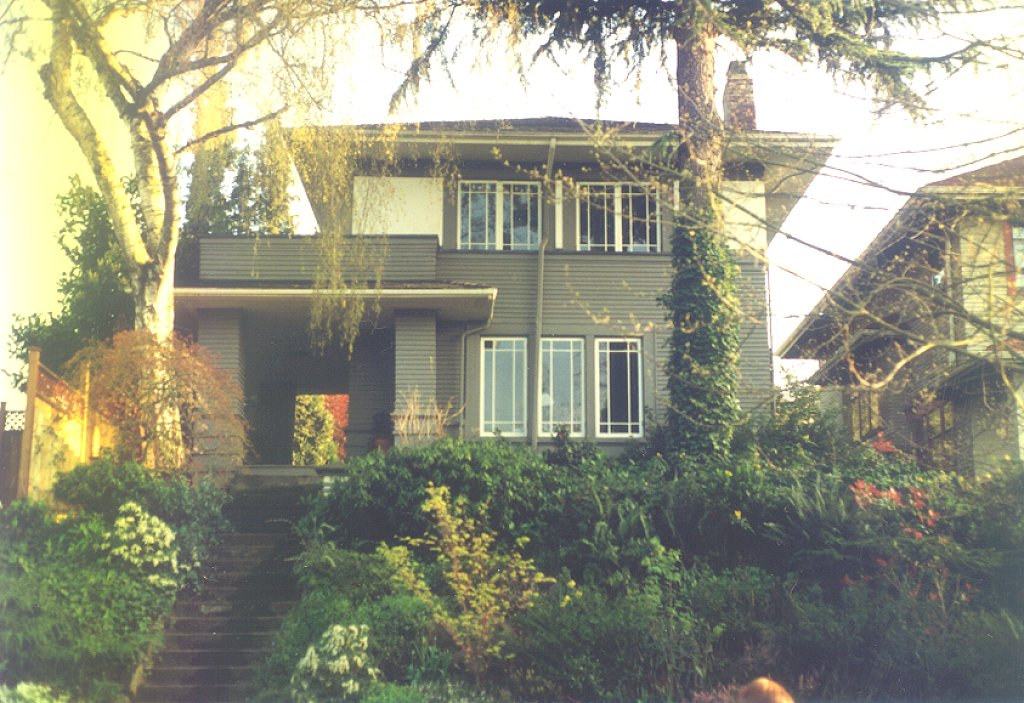
Willatzen & Byrne, George Bellman House, 1912

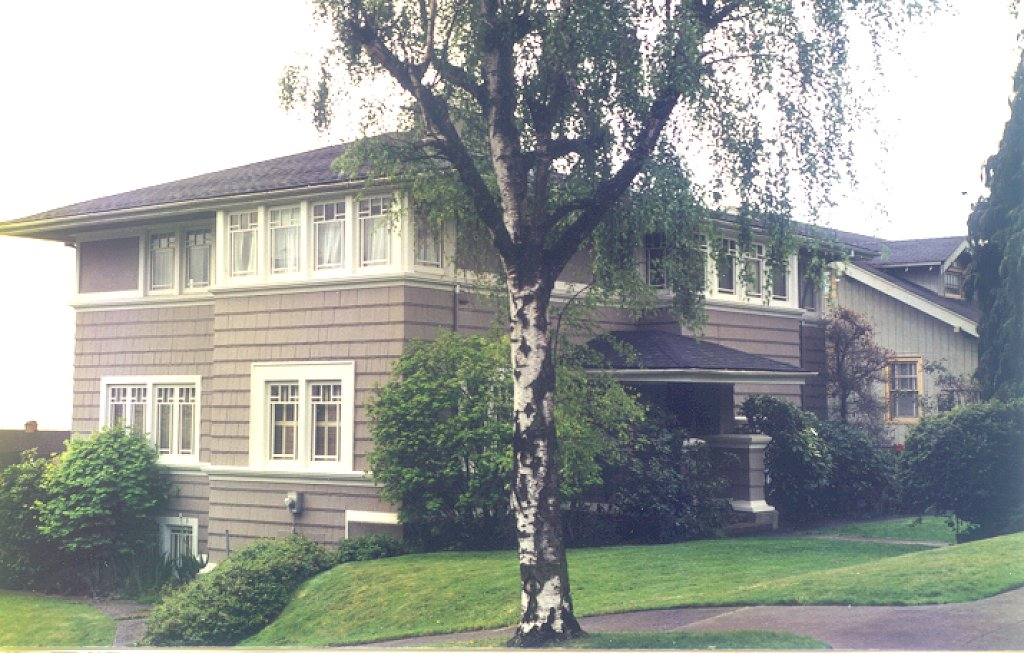
Willatzen & Byrne, L. George Hagar House, 1913

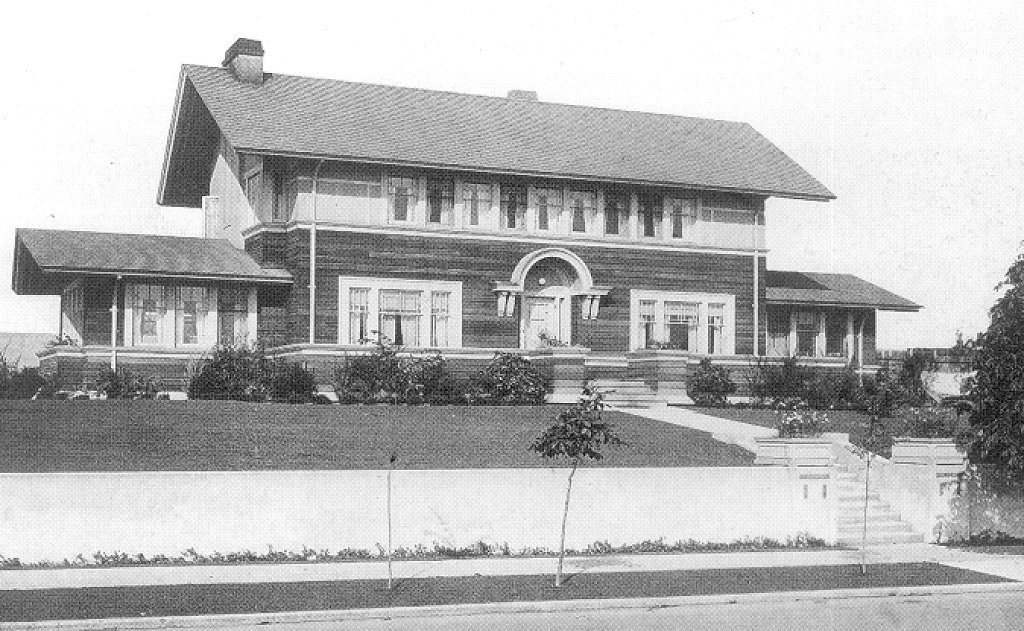
Andrew Willatzen, Joseph Black House, 1914 (Destroyed)

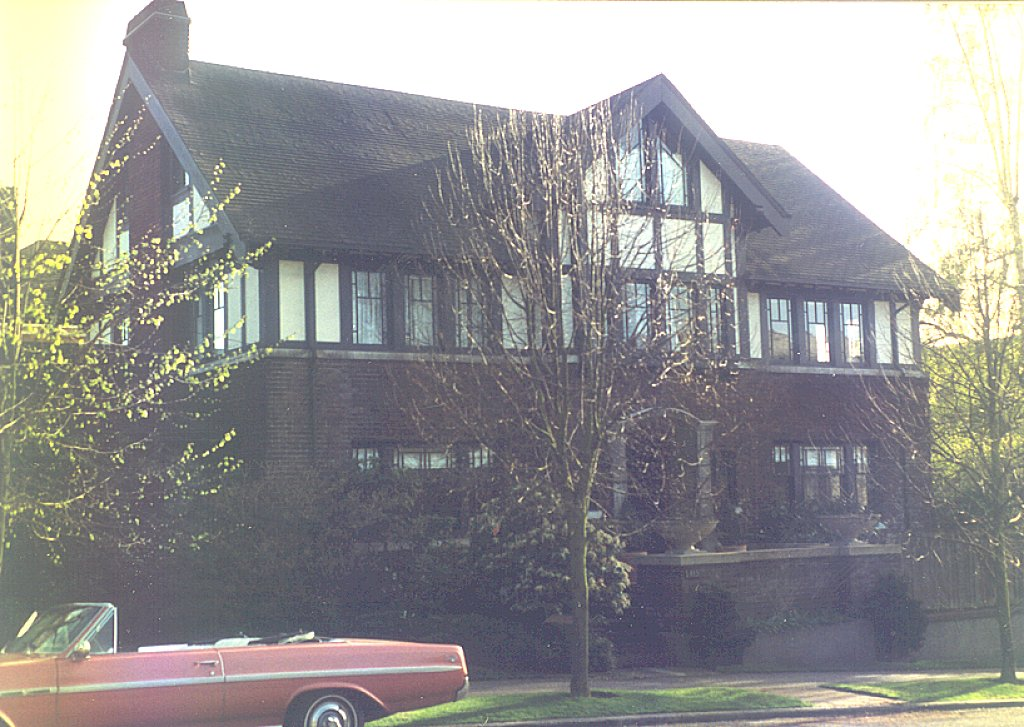
Andrew Willatzen, Frederick Hurlbut House, 1914

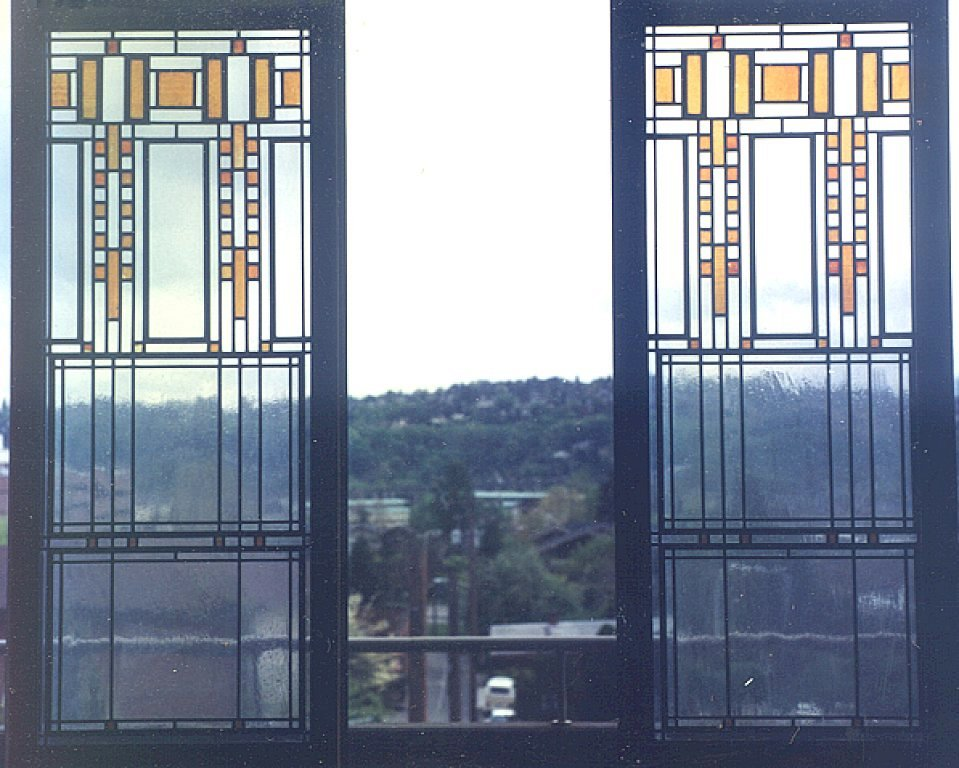
Andrew Willatzen's Office Windows, 1915

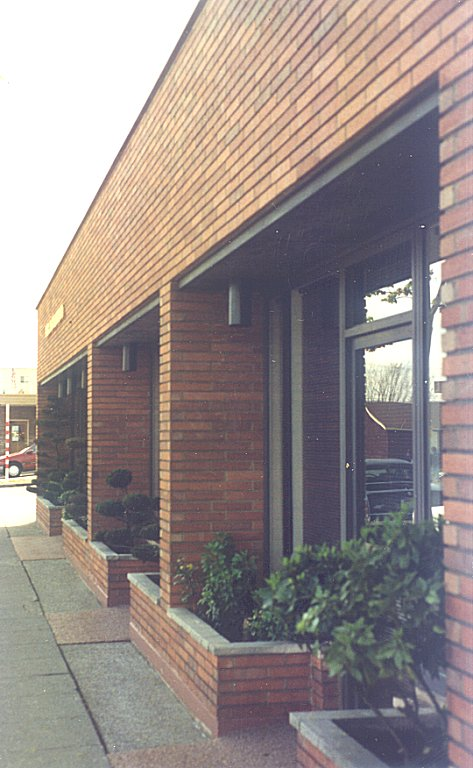
Andrew Willatzen, Church & North Office, 1955

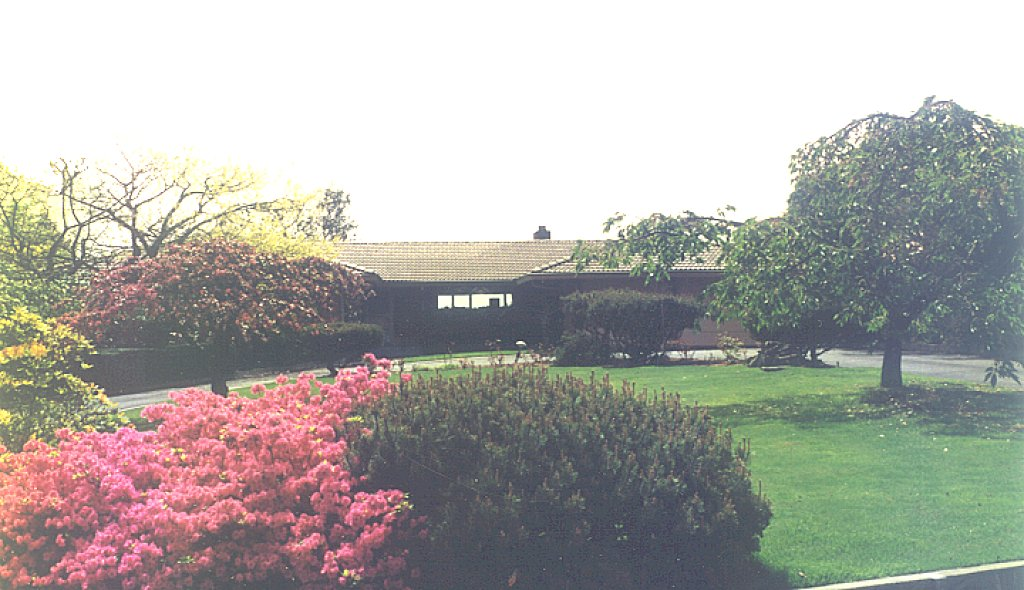
Andrew Willatzen, Richard Desimone House, Normandy Park, WA., 1959

== Other sources ==
- H. Allen Brooks, The Prairie School (Toronto, Norton Press, 1972)
- Grant Carpenter Manson, Frank Lloyd Wright To 1910 (NY., Van Nostrand Reinhold, 1958)
- Silvia Lynn Gills, Andrew C.P. Willatsen, Architect, A.I.A. (1876-1974) (Unpublished thesis. 1980)
