= John Valentine House =

Historic house in Indiana, United States

- Formerly listed on the U.S. National Register of Historic Places
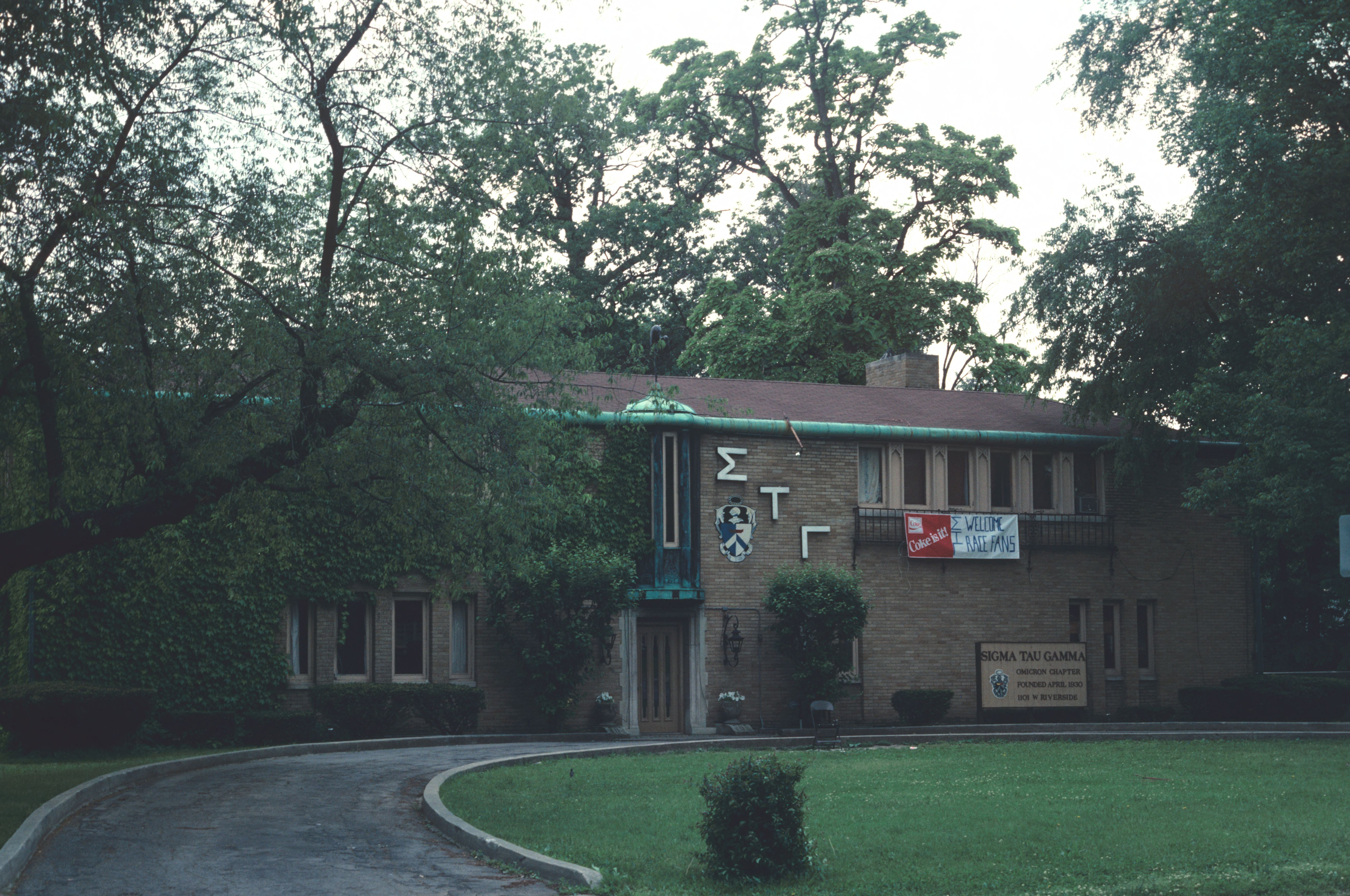
- John Valentine House in 1985

- Location within Indiana Location within the United States
- Location: 1101 Riverside Ave., Muncie, Indiana
- Coordinates: 40°12′0″N 85°23′54″W
- Area: less than one acre
- Built: 1918
- Architect: Barry Byrne
- Architectural style: Prairie School
- NRHP reference No.: 83000026

Significant dates
- Added to NRHP: January 4, 1983
- Removed from NRHP: March 22, 2014

The John Valentine House, now replaced by the Sigma Phi Epsilon Fraternity House, was a Prairie School style building in Muncie, Indiana. It was designed by Barry Byrne and was built in 1918. Formerly the Sigma Tau Gamma fraternity house. Now site of the Sigma Phi Epsilon fraternity house at Ball State University, 1101 Riverside Avenue in Muncie, occupies the site of the John Valentine House. The house was designed by Barry Byrne and was listed on the National Register of Historic Places in 1983.

It appears to have been destroyed and was removed from the National Register on March 22, 2014.
