= George Montegu Black II =

Canadian businessman (1911–1976)

- Born: 3 June 1911; Winnipeg, Manitoba
- Died: 29 June 1976 (aged 65); Toronto, Ontario
- Education: Appleby College ('29); University of Manitoba (BA '33)
- Spouse: Jean Elizabeth Riley (m. 1937)
- Children: George Montegu Black III; Conrad Black
- Father: George Montegu Black Sr.

George Montegu Black II (3 June 1911 – 29 June 1976) was a Canadian business executive who served as the president of Canadian Breweries during the 1950s. He was the father of businessmen Montegu and Conrad Black.

== Life and career ==
He was born in Winnipeg, Manitoba, as the only son of businessman George Montegu Black Sr. and his wife, Gertrude Maxwell Moffat. He attended the preparatory school Appleby College in Oakville, Ontario, then took a short course at McGill University before attending the University of Manitoba, from which he graduated in 1933.

Black became a chartered accountant in 1937. Following the outbreak of the Second World War, he joined the Royal Canadian Air Force and was promptly transferred to a protected civilian post in the Department of National Defence where he worked as an administrator from 1940 to 1945.

On June 5, 1937, he married Jean Elizabeth Riley (1913–1976), the daughter of Conrad Stephenson Riley. They had two sons, Montegu and Conrad Black.

In his business career, Black took over his father's brewery business (Western Breweries Limited) and later sold it to E. P. Taylor’s Canadian Breweries. He became the president of the latter company from 1950 until he retired in 1958.

Black died at Toronto in 1976 and was buried at Mount Pleasant Cemetery.
