= George Montegu Black Sr. =

Canadian businessman (1875–1959)

- Born: 14 December 1875; Halifax, Nova Scotia
- Died: 5 July 1959 (aged 83); Winnipeg, Manitoba
- Occupation: Businessman
- Spouse: Gertrude Maxwell Moffat (m. 1901)
- Children: George Montegu Black II

George Montague Wilmot Black (14 December 1875 – 5 July 1959) was a Canadian businessman who became prominent in Winnipeg, Manitoba. He was the father of George Montegu Black II and grandfather of Conrad Black.

== Life and career ==
Black was born in Halifax, Nova Scotia, the son of Alice Lucy (Ferris) and George Anderson Black. His father was an employee of the Hudson's Bay Company and immigrant from New England. The Black family spent time in Halifax before moving to Winnipeg in 1882.

He worked in real estate and insurance, eventually becoming:

- Partner and President, Robinson & Black (later known as Black & Armstrong)
- President of the Western Dominion Investment Company of Vancouver, British Columbia
- Vice-president of the Manitoba Cold Storage Company of Winnipeg
- Canadian director of the Phoenix Assurance Company of London
- Director of the Canadian Pratt and Whitney Aircraft Company
- Director of Combustion Engineering Corporation

In 1901, he married Gertrude Maxwell Moffat, and they had two children: a daughter and a son, George.

In 1924, Black acquired a brewery business that was founded in 1887 by Edward L. Drewry (1851–1940). Black served as president of Western Breweries Limited and its subsidiary companies until he retired in 1950. He died in 1959 and was buried at St. John's Cemetery in Winnipeg.
