= George Black (author) =

Scottish journalist

George Black is a Scottish writer and journalist.

== Early life and education ==
Black was born in Cowdenbeath, Scotland. He received a degree from the University of Oxford.

== Career ==
Black was a columnist for the Los Angeles Times.

From 1986 to 1991, Black was the foreign editor of The Nation. From 2004 to 2014, he was the executive editor of OnEarth magazine, a publication of the Natural Resources Defense Council.

Since 2014, Black has been a contributor to Salon, The Nation, The Guardian, New Yorker.com, and other publications.

== Personal life ==
Black is married to Anne Nelson. Together they have two children.

== Awards and honors ==
Empire of Shadows was a finalist for the 2012 Los Angeles Times Book Prize.

== Books ==
- THE GOOD NEIGHBOR How the United States Wrote the History of Central America and the Caribbean (1988)
- Empire of Shadows: The Epic Story of Yellowstone
- On the Ganges: Encounters with Saints and Sinners Along India's Mythic River
- Casting a Spell: The Bamboo Fly Rod and the American Pursuit of Perfection
- The Trout Pool Paradox: The American Lives of Three Rivers
- Black Hands of Beijing: Lives of Defiance in China's Democracy Movement
- The Long Reckoning: A Story of War, Peace, and Redemption in Vietnam (Deckle Edge, 2023)
