= Isham F. Norris =

American politician (1851-1928)

Isham (Isaac) Franklin Norris
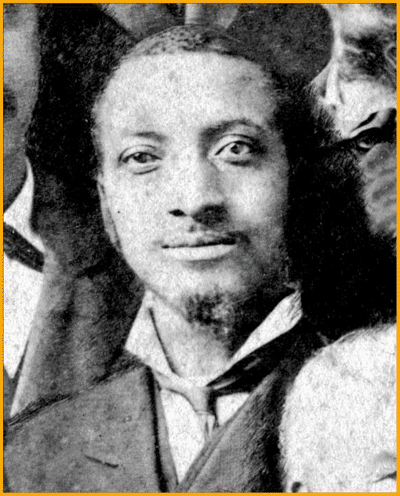

Tennessee House of Representatives
- In office 1881–1882

Personal details
- Born: October 15, 1851 Montgomery, Alabama, U.S.
- Died: September 23, 1928 (aged 76) Seattle, Washington, U.S.
- Spouse: Stella R. Butler
- Children: 5

Isham Franklin "I. F." Norris Sr. (October 15, 1851 – September 23, 1928), also known as Isaac Norris, was an American businessman and politician came to prominence in Memphis, Tennessee, before moving to Oklahoma Territory and then Seattle, Washington. He served one term in the Tennessee House of Representatives for the 42nd General Assembly in 1881 and 1882.

He was African American. He had a wife and 5 sons.

== See also ==
- African American officeholders from the end of the Civil War until before 1900
