= Guri Weinberg =

Israeli-American actor (born 1972)

- גורי ויינברג
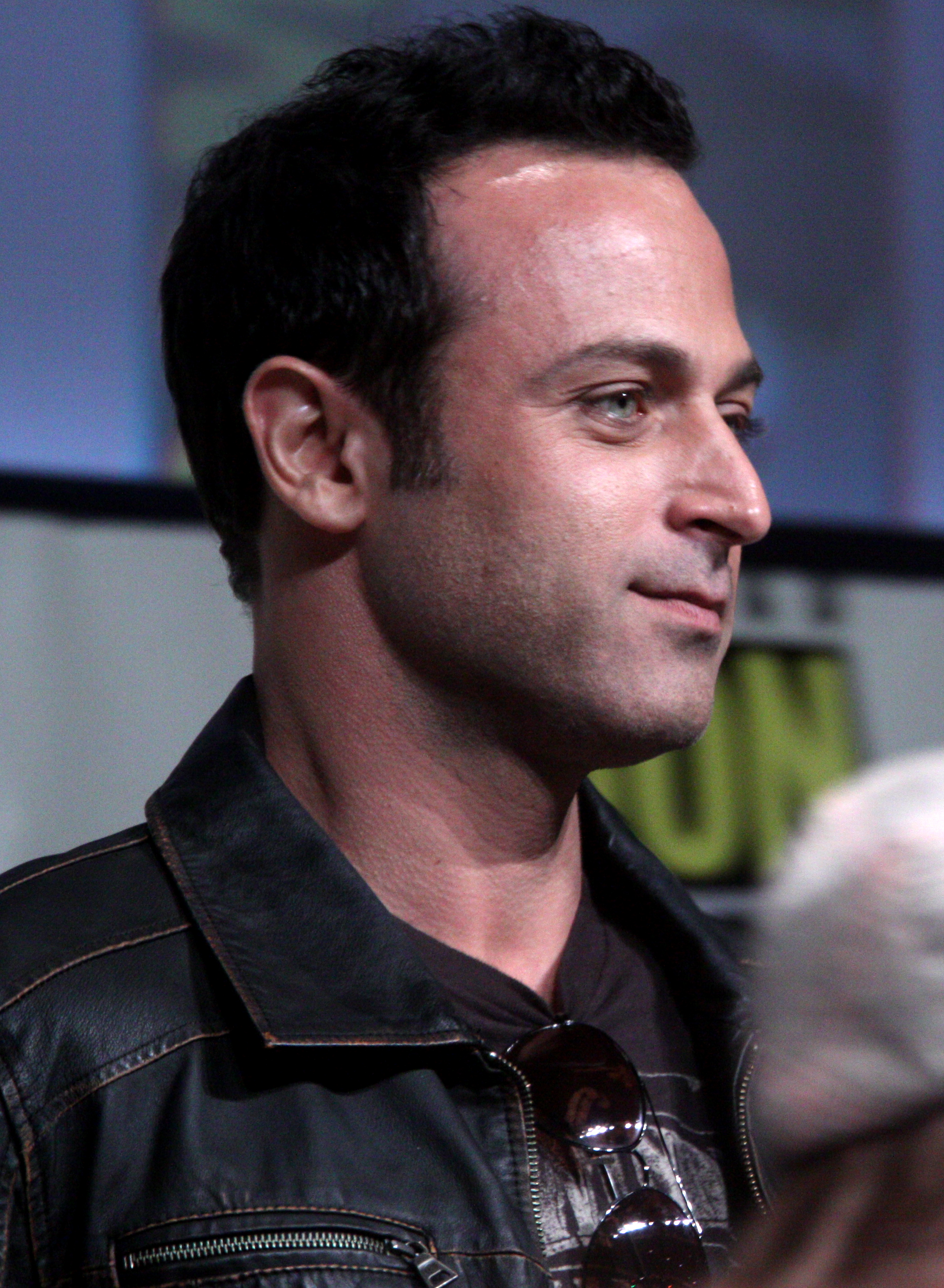
- Weinberg at the 2012 San Diego Comic-Con
- Born: August 1, 1972 (age 54); Israel
- Occupation: Actor
- Years active: 1993–present
- Spouse: Tammy Lauren (m. 1997)
- Relatives: Moshe Weinberg (father)

Guri Weinberg (Hebrew: גורי ויינברג; born August 1, 1972) is an Israeli-American actor. He is known for playing Stefan in The Twilight Saga: Breaking Dawn - Part 2 (2012), from The Twilight Saga film series based on the novels of the same name by Stephenie Meyer.

Weinberg began his acting career with bit roles in television series and movies, such as The Young Indiana Jones Chronicles (1993) and Odd Jobs (1997), before receiving more prominent roles in films such as You Don't Mess With the Zohan (2008). Weinberg also portrayed his father, Moshe Weinberg, in the 2005 film Munich, directed by Steven Spielberg.

He has been married to American film and television actress Tammy Lauren since 1997.

== Early life ==
Weinberg was born on August 1, 1972, in Israel to Mimi and Moshe Weinberg. His father was the coach of the international wrestling team for Israel and of Hapoel Tel Aviv; he had previously been the Israeli youth wrestling champion, and also held a similar title for 8 years, as the Israeli adult wrestling champion. Weinberg was one month old when his father, as national wrestling coach for Israel and as part of the 1972 Summer Olympics team, travelled to Munich, where he was murdered alongside another ten team members in a terrorist attack led by Palestinian militant group Black September in the Munich massacre.

Following the death of her husband, Weinberg's mother Mimi relocated with her son in 1986 to the United States of America, settling in Los Angeles, California. Weinberg attended Beverly Hills High School.

== Career ==
Weinberg has appeared in numerous bit roles in television series and films, as well as in more prominent roles.

He began his acting career at age 21, appearing in an episode of The Young Indiana Jones Chronicles ("Young Indiana Jones and the Scandal of 1920"). Following this, Weinberg had small roles in television films, such as Odd Jobs (1997), starring Patrick Dempsey, as well as in occasional episodes of other television series such as Jack in the third season of Pensacola: Wings of Gold ("Don't Ask, Don't Tell").

In 2005, when Weinberg was 33, director and producer Steven Spielberg offered him the role of his own, biological father Moshe Weinberg, in the historical drama film Munich, based on the events following the Munich massacre of the 1972 Summer Olympics in which his father was killed by a terrorist group known as Black September. The film was also based on the book Vengeance, by Canadian-Hungarian author George Jonas. The film received several Academy Awards nominations, including for Best Picture, and was named the 16th "Best Film of the 21st Century So Far" by The New York Times, in 2017. It generated both a lot of praise and critique for its portrayal of the historical events it was representing, including from Weinberg's own mother Mimi, who was unhappy with the film. She later said she did not want people to view the film, despite her son appearing in it, calling it "a fantasy."

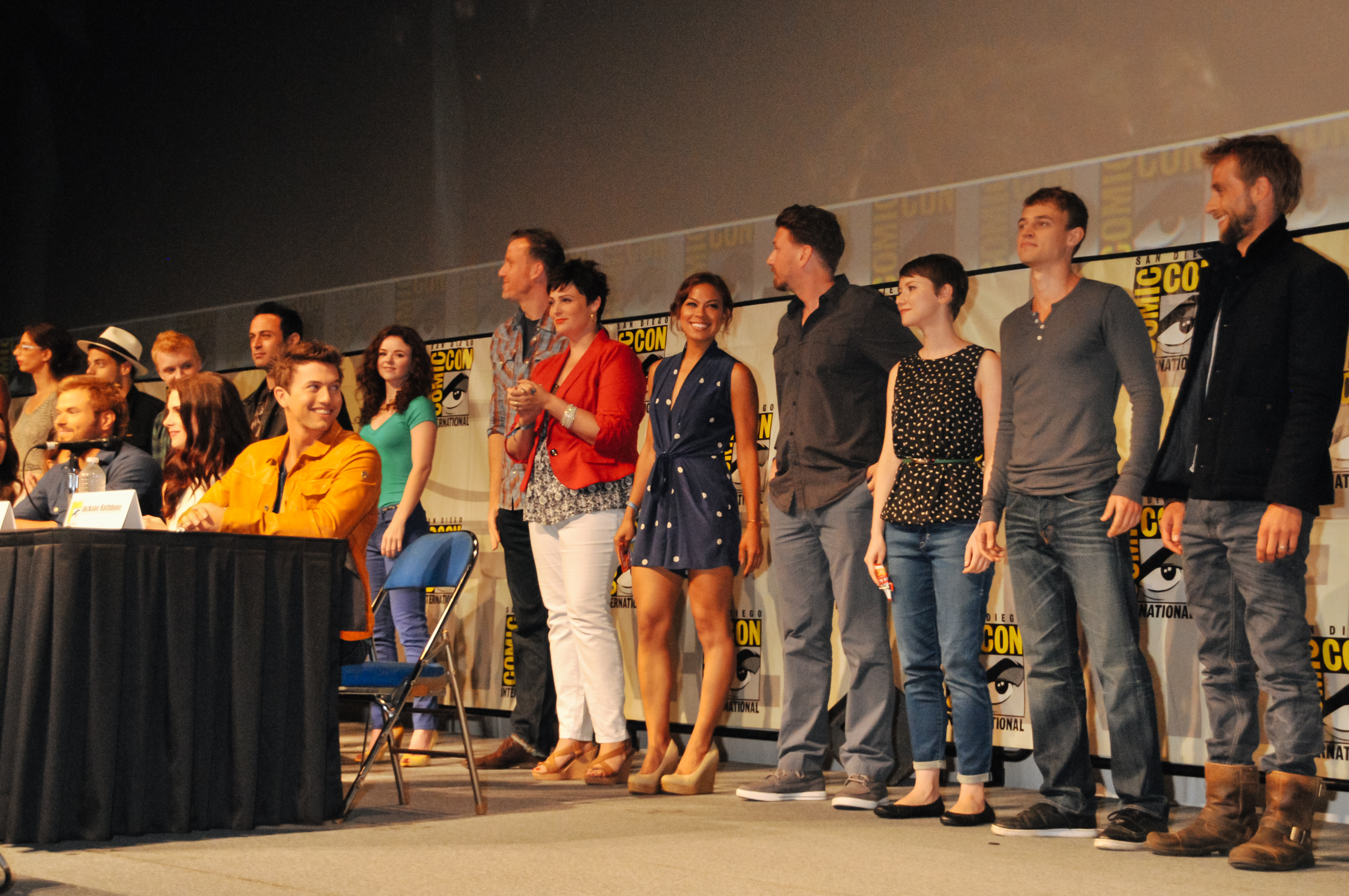
Weinberg (standing, 4th from left) at San Diego Comic-Con in 2012 with fellow cast members from The Twilight Saga: Breaking Dawn - Part 2.

Following such success of Munich, Weinberg received greater interest for his acting. He stated in an interview in 2006 that he had previously been involved in smaller roles, "but now I'm in demand, I've got a ton of auditions [following Munich]." The interest generated in him as an actor following his role in Spielberg's film resulted in him being offered roles in successful commercial films, notably as Aharon in the political satire You Don't Mess With the Zohan (2008), starring and produced by Adam Sandler. In 2012, Weinberg appeared as Stefan, a member of the Romanian vampire coven along with Canadian actor Noel Fisher (in the role of Vladimir) in The Twilight Saga: Breaking Dawn - Part 2. This film, the final of The Twilight Saga film series based on Stephenie Meyer's novels of the same name, performed successfully at the box office despite mixed reviews by critics, and was the highest-grossing film of the saga series overall, generating $292.3 million.

Weinberg has featured as a recurring character in the short-lived television series Cane, in the role of Yossi/Yosi, as well as in NCIS: Los Angeles, as Yaniv. More recently, he appeared in the role of Avi in the 2018 film, First We Take Brooklyn, starring Charlotte McKinney. He has enjoyed single episode or short-term roles in many popular American television shows, including The Closer, Burn Notice and The Mentalist.

Weinberg frequently writes on his blog, accessible via his official website, and in the past has written opinion or guest pieces for media outlets such as Fox News, for whom he wrote an opinion piece in 2014. He updated his blog during filming of Breaking Dawn - Part 2, recounting pranks and friendship amongst cast and crew members.

He is also the co-founder (along with his wife, Tammy Lauren, and writer/director Nony Geffen) and CEO of Destiny's Saloon, a self-reported "artist owned, boutique multimedia agency based in the Coachella Valley."

== Personal life ==
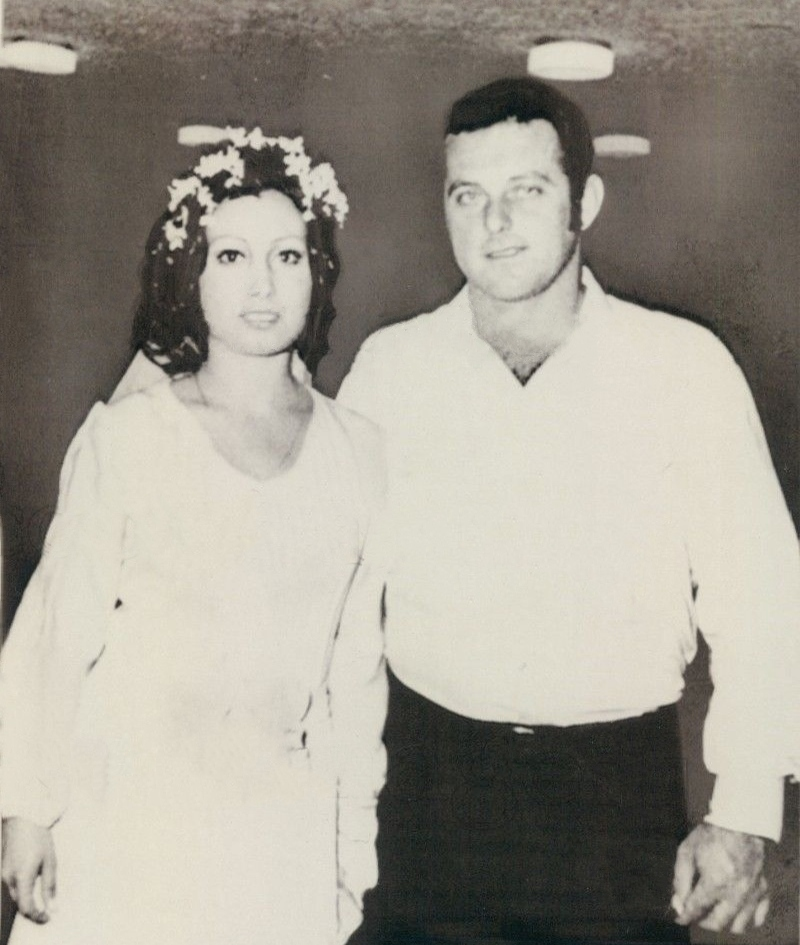
Weinberg's mother and late father, Mimi and Moshe Weinberg, in 1971.

Weinberg's father Moshe Weinberg was killed in the Munich massacre by Palestinian terrorist group Black September at the 1972 Summer Olympics in Munich, Germany, when Weinberg was one month old. His father had been attending the Olympics as part of the Israeli wrestling team, due to his position as the national wrestling coach. In regards to his father's death, Weinberg has said in an interview: "I was angry with him for many years...I thought that if he hadn't tried to fight them, maybe I would have had a father." He refers to his father's reported protesting against his terrorist captors, which led to them shooting him and leaving his body in the street whilst they took other team members hostage. Weinberg later played the role of his father Moshe in Steven Spielberg's 2005 film Munich, which was based on the massacre as well as on the book Vengeance by George Jonas. Despite her son appearing in the film, Weinberg's mother Mimi has expressed her frustration at Spielberg's portrayal of the events and people involved, stating she "[doesn't] want people to see it, even if [her] son is in it."

Weinberg married actress Tammy Lauren in 1997. The couple do not have any children together.

== Filmography ==
=== Film ===
Year	Title	Role	Notes
2005	Munich	Moshe Weinberg	Portraying his own father, Moshe Weinberg; the film received 5 Academy Awards nominations, including for Best Picture
2008	You Don't Mess With the Zohan	Aharon	
2012	The Twilight Saga: Breaking Dawn - Part 2	Stefan	
2018	First We Take Brooklyn	Avi	

=== Television ===
Year	Title	Role	Notes
1993	The Young Indiana Jones Chronicles	George Kaufman	Episode: "Young Indiana Jones and the Scandal of 1920"
1996	Backroads to Vegas	Andres	Television film
1997	In Dark Places	Gym Member #1	Television film
1997	Odd Jobs	Dario	Television film
1999	Pensacola: Wings of Gold	Jack	Episode: "Don't Ask, Don't Tell"
2006	The Closer	Nicholas Costa	Episode: "Out of Focus"
2007	The Man	Lenny Dalton	Television film
2007	Burn Notice	Ari Zamar	Episode: "Family Business"
2007	Cane	Yossi/Yosi	Episodes: "A New Legacy" "Brotherhood" "The Two Alex Vegas"
2010	The Good Guys	Zev	Episode: "Supercops"
2013	Body of Proof	Arco Starkovich	Episode: "Fallen Angel"
2013	The Mentalist	Arek Green	Episode: "The Desert Rose"
2017	NCIS: Los Angeles	Yaniv	Episodes: "Golden Days" "Battle Scars"
