= Demeter (disambiguation) =

Demeter is the grain goddess in Greek mythology.

Demeter may also refer to:

== Science and technology ==
- Demeter (moon), former name of Lysithea, a satellite of Jupiter
- 1108 Demeter, an asteroid
- Demeter (satellite), a French micro-satellite launched in 2004 for developing earthquake prediction
- Law of Demeter, a software development design guideline

== Arts and entertainment ==
- Demeter (cat), character from the musical Cats by Andrew Lloyd Webber
- Demeter, a 300 BC elegy by Philitas of Cos
- "Demeter", a 1999 sonnet by Carol Ann Duffy
- Demeter, the fictional ship which brought Count Dracula to England in Bram Stoker's novel Dracula
- Demeter, a freighter vessel in the Egosoft video game series X
- Demeter, a terrain bot in Windows game Active Worlds
- Demeter 227, the interstellar cargo ship in Scavengers Reign.

== Brands and companies ==
- Demeter Fragrance Library, a fragrance company
- Demeter International, a certification organization for biodynamic farming

== Other ==
- Demeter (surname)
- USS Demeter (ARB-10), USS battle damage repair ship

== See also ==
- Demetrius
