= Juval Aviv =

Israeli writer

- יובל אביב
- Born: Yuval Aviof; February 24, 1947 (age 79); Kfar Menachem, Israel
- Other names: Yuval Aviv, Sam Green
- Occupations: Security consultant, writer

Juval Aviv (Hebrew: יובל אביב; February 24, 1947), also Yuval Aviv, is an Israeli-American security consultant and founder of Interfor International, a corporate investigations firm in New York City. Juval Aviv is also an author under the pseudonym Sam Green.

In particular, Aviv investigated the terrorist attack on Pan Am Flight 103.

== Biography ==
Yuval Aviof (later Juval Aviv) was born in Kfar Menachem on February 24, 1947 as Yuval Aviof. He received his master's degree from Tel Aviv University. Aviof served as a major in Israel's Defence Force and Mossad from 1968 to 1979. According to the Herald Sun, he participated in Mossad secret service operations in many countries.

== Business career ==
Aviv is president and CEO of Interfor, an international investigative and intelligence firm, according to the ABA Banking Journal. He has investigated cases such as the bombing of Pan Am Flight 103 for clients US Aviation and Pan American World Airways.

Aviv was employed by Pan Am in 1989 to investigate who had bombed Pan Am Flight 103. He says that he received the information from people who were involved directly and indirectly. In his report, he claimed that US agents had been monitoring a heroin-smuggling route operating from the Middle East to the United States, which was run by a Syrian criminal.

Aviv said that the Syrians had ties to Hezbollah militants who were holding Westerners hostage in Beirut. According to Aviv, US agents agreed to allow the heroin smuggling to continue in return for help in freeing the hostages. At some point Turkish extremists, who worked at Frankfurt Airport as baggage handlers, swapped a suitcase of heroin for a bomb.

The President's Commission on Aviation Security and Terrorism examined these allegations in 1989 and found "no foundation for speculation in press accounts that U.S. government officials had participated tacitly or otherwise in any supposed operation at Frankfurt Airport having anything to do with the sabotage of Flight 103."

After the Interfor report was released, Aviv was described by diplomatic and intelligence officials as "a fabricator who had lied about his entire background." Later, Aviv stated, "I was never told directly that [my report] was wrong, I was always attacked as the messenger, as somebody who was a fabricator, a lunatic, whatever." American RadioWorks, the national documentary unit of American Public Media, looked into allegations that Aviv had never been employed by the FBI or Mossad. They found several documents, including a memo from the FBI from 1982 and an informant agreement between Aviv and the US Justice Department, which refer to a past association with Israeli intelligence. He has been used as a source by publications such as the New York Times and by news networks Fox News Channel and ABC News.

== Involvement in Vengeance ==
In 1981, Canadian writer George Jonas was approached by Collins Canada about meeting with Aviv, who claimed to have been involved in Mossad assassinations following the Munich massacre. In a joint deal, two Toronto-based publishing houses, Lester & Orpen Dennys and Collins Canada Ltd, commissioned Jonas to research and write Aviv's account.

Vengeance (1984) depicted Aviv's character as "Avner", though that is in dispute.

According to Maclean's, which put together an 11-person investigative team to find out whether Aviv's story was true, the book generated $500,000 in advance foreign sales. After his book was published, Jonas told a journalist for Maclean's that he had spent two years and $30,000 of the publishers' money conducting research in Europe and Israel. American RadioWorks, the national documentary unit of American Public Media, looked into the allegations as well and noted several court documents, including a memo from the FBI from 1982 and an informant agreement between Aviv and the US Justice Department, both of which refer to a past association with Israeli intelligence.

In 1984, Jonas, Louise Dennys, and the president of Collins Canada, Nicholas Harris, told Maclean's they were satisfied that the story was genuine. Jonas told Maclean's: "To my mind, if he [Aviv] is not legit, then he can only be a disgruntled ex-employee of Mossad with sufficient knowledge of what has gone down in this area. As far as I am concerned, if he is not who he says he is, then that is what he is."

In 1986, the book was adapted as a made-for-television movie, Sword of Gideon, starring Steven Bauer and Michael York. The book was also turned into a 2005 feature film Munich directed by Steven Spielberg, starring Eric Bana, Daniel Craig and Geoffrey Rush.

The book The Men Who Would Be King: An Almost Epic Tale of Moguls, Movies, and a Company Called DreamWorks claims that Spielberg vetted Aviv during pre-production on the movie, Munich (2005). Spielberg assembled a brain trust of researchers and, through his connections at the White House and a Middle East diplomat, determined that, "His real name was Juval Aviv. Furthermore, Spielberg's brain trust discovered FBI files proving that he and his team were not fictitious."

== Published works ==
- (2003) The Complete Terrorism Survival Guide: How to Travel, Work and Live in Safety. Juris Publications, ISBN 1-57823-130-2
- (2004) Staying Safe: The Complete Guide to Protecting Yourself, Your Family, and Your Business. Collins, ISBN 0-06-073520-1
- (2006) Max, based on the death of British publisher Robert Maxwell. ISBN 1-84413-875-5
- (2008) Flight 103, later published as Flight Into Danger, based on the Lockerbie bombing. ISBN 978-0-09-951477-0
