= Peter Demeter =

Canadian convicted murderer (born 1933)

Peter Demeter (/ˈdɛmətər/; born 19 April 1933) is a Hungarian-born Canadian former real estate developer convicted in 1974 of arranging the murder of his wife. It was the longest trial in Canadian history to that date, and revealed that both husband and wife may have been plotting to murder the other to collect a CA$1 million (equivalent to $6.3 million in 2025) insurance policy. The suspected contract killer Demeter hired was identified but never found.

While serving his sentence and living in a convicts' halfway house, in 1983, Demeter was charged on two counts with trying to arrange the kidnapping and murder of the son of his cousin; the latter was managing his financial affairs. In 1985 Demeter was convicted of the charges and given a second life sentence.

== Early life and education ==
Demeter was born in Budapest, Hungary into a wealthy family that became impoverished following World War II and the rise of the Communist government. In 1956, at the age of 23, Demeter emigrated to Canada. He was among 200,000 refugees who escaped from the country after suppression of the Hungarian Revolution of 1956 by Soviet forces. By 1962, Demeter had started a successful career in Toronto as a land developer.

== Marriage and family ==
In 1967 Demeter married Christine Ferrari, an Austrian-born model. They had a daughter, Andrea, together, but the marriage became strained. On 18 July 1973, the 33-year-old Christine was found murdered, bludgeoned to death in the garage of their family home in Mississauga, Ontario.

By 1985, when Demeter was convicted for later criminal acts, he was engaged to a woman named Lisa Ross.

== Criminal charges and trials ==
Demeter was charged with the murder of his wife Christine on 18 July 1973 at their home at 1437 Dundas Crescent North, Mississauga, Ontario. He was subsequently tried for non-capital murder, in London, Ontario, and represented by lawyers Edward Greenspan and Joseph Pomerant.

In what was then the longest trial in Canadian history, he was convicted on 6 December 1974 of arranging for the murder and was sentenced to life imprisonment. The two primary witnesses for the prosecution included a so-called Mr. X who was hooded (to protect his identity) throughout the trial and later identified as Gyala Virag who testified that Demeter had hired a contract killer with the nickname "The Duck" (Hungarian: Kacsa), later identified as a small-time criminal named Imre Olejnyik.

The other significant witness was Demeter's former friend and police informant, Csaba Szilagy, who testified that the defendant had tried to hire him to murder Ferrari. The prosecution's case was aided by tapes secretly recorded by Szilagy of conversations with Demeter after his wife's murder. During the trial, it was revealed that the husband and wife may each have been plotting to murder the other to collect on $1 million insurance policies. Demeter did not testify but maintained his innocence.

On 6 December 1974, the Canadian government requested extradition from Hungary of Imre Olejnyik, who was suspected of the physical murder of Christine Demeter. He was never found. Subsequent news reports indicated that "The Duck" had died in Hungary in 1975.

In 1983 while living at a convicts' halfway house, Demeter was charged with planning a kidnapping and murder of the son of the cousin who had been taking care of Demeter's daughter as well as his financial affairs. He intended to have this individual kidnapped to gain money and then have him killed. Demeter was convicted in July 1985 while in prison and given a second life sentence.

He was also charged with arson in 1983 in connection with the family home in Mississauga. In 1988, he was charged with planning to kidnap and murder the daughter of his lawyer, Toby Belman, resulting in two additional life sentences.

In May 2006 a judge ordered Demeter to provide a DNA sample to the country's DNA data bank, as law enforcement was collecting data from prisoners. (Demeter had refused to allow a sample to be taken.)

While in prison, Demeter has suffered a stroke and a heart attack. He has had chemotherapy administered in relation to three diagnoses of cancer. Demeter is serving his term at the medium-security Bath Institute in Bath, Ontario. In a CBC interview on 30 May 2006, he said conclusively that he will be in prison for the rest of his life.

In March 2019, it was reported that Demeter had applied for parole again more than 20 years after his first day parole had been revoked, but the Parole Board denied to release him from prison.

== In popular culture ==
Demeter's story and trial served as the basis for the 1978 fictional film I Miss You, Hugs and Kisses (also called Drop Dead, Dearest and Left for Dead), directed by Murray Markowitz. His figure in the movie, named Charles Kruschen, is played by actor Donald Pilon. His wife was played by Elke Sommer. The film caused controversy in the UK when it was listed as a video nasty by the Director of Public Prosecutions in 1984.

The murder and trial were the subject of By Persons Unknown: The Strange Death of Christine Demeter, by George Jonas and Barbara Amiel, winner of the Mystery Writers of America's 1978 Edgar Award for Best Fact Crime book.
