= Interfor =

Interfor may refer to:

- Interfor Corporation, the lumber producer
- Interfor International LLC., an international investigation firm offering comprehensive domestic and foreign intelligence services
