= Demeter (surname) =

Demeter is a surname. Notable people with the surname include:

- Christine Demeter (died 1973), murder victim
- Dimitrija Demeter (1811–1872), Croatian poet and playwright
- Don Demeter, American baseball player
- George Demeter, author of Demeter's Manual of Parliamentary Law and Procedure
- Peter Demeter, Christine Demeter's husband, convicted in her death
- Steve Demeter (1935–2013), American baseball player and scout
