= Munich (2005 film) =

2005 historical film directed by Steven Spielberg

- Theatrical release poster
- Directed by: Steven Spielberg
- Screenplay by: Eric Roth; Tony Kushner
- Based on: Vengeance by George Jonas
- Produced by: Steven Spielberg; Kathleen Kennedy; Barry Mendel; Colin Wilson
- Starring: Eric Bana; Daniel Craig; Ciarán Hinds; Mathieu Kassovitz; Hanns Zischler; Geoffrey Rush
- Cinematography: Janusz Kamiński
- Edited by: Michael Kahn
- Music by: John Williams
- Production companies: Amblin Entertainment; The Kennedy/Marshall Company; Alliance Atlantis
- Distributed by: Universal Pictures (United States and Canada); DreamWorks Pictures (International)
- Release date: December 23, 2005 (United States)
- Running time: 163 minutes
- Countries: United States; Canada
- Languages: English; French; German; Hebrew; Arabic
- Budget: $70 million
- Box office: $131 million

Munich is a 2005 historical drama film produced and directed by Steven Spielberg, co-written by Tony Kushner and Eric Roth. It is based on the 1984 book Vengeance by George Jonas, an account of Mossad assassinations following the Munich massacre during the 1972 Summer Olympics.

Munich was released by Universal Pictures in the United States and Canada and internationally by DreamWorks Pictures on December 23, 2005, and received five Oscar nominations: Best Picture, Best Director, Best Adapted Screenplay, Best Editing, and Best Score. The film made $131 million worldwide but just $47 million in the United States, making it one of Spielberg's lowest-grossing films domestically. In 2017, the film was named the 16th "Best Film of the 21st Century So Far" by The New York Times.

== Plot ==
A scene from the film representing the Mossad team from 1972. From left to right: Avner Kaufman, Robert, Carl, Hans and Steve.

At the 1972 Summer Olympics in Munich, the Palestinian militant group Black September carried out a terrorist attack resulting in the deaths of eleven members of the Israeli Olympic team. Avner Kaufman, a Mossad agent of German-Jewish descent, is chosen to lead a mission to assassinate eleven Palestinians involved in the massacre. At the direction of his handler Ephraim, in order to give the Israeli government plausible deniability, Kaufman resigns from Mossad and operates with no official ties to Israel. His team includes four Jewish volunteers from around the world: South African driver Steve, Belgian toy-maker and explosives expert Robert, former Israeli soldier and "cleaner" Carl, and German antique dealer and document forger Hans from Frankfurt. They are given information by a French informant, Louis, whose family's history is connected to the French Resistance.

In Rome, the team shoots and kills Wael Zwaiter, who is living as a poet. In Paris, they detonate a bomb in the home of Mahmoud Hamshari. In Cyprus, they bomb the hotel room of Hussein Abd Al Chir. With IDF commandos, they pursue three Palestinian militants—Muhammad Youssef al-Najjar, Kamal Adwan, and Kamal Nasser—to Beirut, penetrate the Palestinians' guarded compound and kill all three.

Between hits, the assassins argue with each other about the morality and logistics of their mission, expressing fear about their individual lack of experience, as well as their apparent ambivalence about accidentally killing innocent bystanders. Avner makes a brief visit to his wife, who has given birth to their first baby. In Athens, when they track down Zaiad Muchasi, the team finds out that Louis arranged for them to share a safe house with their rival PLO members and the Mossad agents escape trouble by pretending to be members of foreign militant groups like ETA, IRA, ANC, and the Red Army Faction. Avner has a heartfelt conversation with PLO member Ali over their homelands and who deserves to rule over the lands. Ali is later shot by Carl while the team escapes from the hit on Muchasi.

The squad moves on to London to track down Ali Hassan Salameh, who orchestrated the Munich massacre, but the assassination attempt is interrupted by several drunken Americans. It is implied that these are agents of the CIA, which, according to Louis, protects and funds Salameh in exchange for his promise not to attack United States diplomats. Meanwhile, attempts are made to kill the assassins themselves. Carl is killed by an independent Dutch contract killer. In revenge, the team tracks her down and executes her at a houseboat in Hoorn, Netherlands. Hans is found stabbed to death on a park bench, and Robert is killed by an explosion in his workshop. Avner and Steve finally locate Salameh in Spain, but again their assassination attempt is thwarted, this time by Salameh's armed guards. Avner and Steve disagree on whether Louis has sold information on the team to the PLO.

A disillusioned Avner flies to Israel, where he is unhappy to be hailed as a hero by two young soldiers, and then to his new home in Brooklyn, where he suffers post-traumatic stress, paranoia and has flashbacks from the Munich massacre. Concerns continue to grow when he speaks to Louis' father by phone and it is revealed he knows his real name and promises no violence will come to him from his family. He is thrown out of the Israeli consulate after storming in to demand that Mossad leave his wife and child alone. Ephraim comes to ask Avner to return to Israel and Mossad, but Avner refuses. Avner then asks Ephraim to come to dinner with his family, to break bread as an allegory to make peace, but Ephraim refuses, perhaps as a sign that neither side will reconcile.

A title card reveals nine (Note: A book called Striding Back, which was published in 2006, the year after the film was released, claimed Wadie Haddad was given poisoned chocolate by Mossad. If that were true that would mean actually ten of the eleven targets were killed. Abu Daoud was still alive when the film was released.) of the eleven targeted Palestinians were killed, including Salameh, who was finally killed in 1979.

== Cast ==
- Eric Bana as Avner Kaufman (based on Yuval Aviv)
- Daniel Craig as Steve
- Ciarán Hinds as Carl
- Mathieu Kassovitz as Robert
- Hanns Zischler as Hans
- Ayelet Zurer as Daphna Kaufman
- Geoffrey Rush as Ephraim
- Mehdi Nebbou as Ali Hassan Salameh
- Gila Almagor as Avner's Mother
- Karim Saleh as Issa
- Michael Lonsdale as Papa
- Mathieu Amalric as Louis
- Ziad Adwan as Kamal Adwan
- Moritz Bleibtreu as Andreas
- Yvan Attal as Tony
- Valeria Bruni Tedeschi as Sylvie
- Meret Becker as Yvonne
- Roy Avigdori as Gad Tsobari
- Sam Feuer as Yossef Romano
- Marie-Josée Croze as Jeanette, the Dutch assassin
- Lynn Cohen as Golda Meir
- Guri Weinberg as Moshe Weinberg
- Makram Khoury as Wael Zwaiter
- Hiam Abbass as Marie
- Omar Metwally as Ali
- Ohad Knoller as Commando

== Soundtrack ==
Munich

Film score by John Williams
- Released: December 27, 2005
- Recorded: 2005
- Studio: Sony Pictures Studios
- Genre: Soundtrack
- Length: 62:37
- Label: Decca
- Producer: John Williams

John Williams chronology
Memoirs of a Geisha (2005)	Munich (2005)	Indiana Jones and the Kingdom of the Crystal Skull (2008)

The film score was composed and conducted by John Williams. It features the wailing woman technique. The soundtrack album was nominated for the Academy Award for Best Original Score and the Grammy Award for Best Score Soundtrack for Visual Media.

AllMusic rated the soundtrack three and a half stars out of five. Filmtracks.com rated it four out of five. SoundtrackNet rated it four and a half out of five. ScoreNotes graded it "A−".

== Historical authenticity ==
Although Munich is a work of fiction, it describes many actual events and figures from the early 1970s. On the Israeli side, Prime Minister Golda Meir is depicted in the film, and other military and political leaders such as Attorney General Meir Shamgar, Mossad chief Zvi Zamir and Aman chief Aharon Yariv are also depicted. Spielberg tried to make the depiction of the hostage-taking and killing of the Israeli athletes historically authentic. Unlike an earlier film, 21 Hours at Munich, Spielberg's film depicts the shooting of all the Israeli athletes, which according to the autopsies was accurate. In addition, the film uses actual news clips shot during the hostage situation.

Israeli/American actor Guri Weinberg portrays his own father, wrestling coach Moshe. The younger Weinberg was only one month old when his father was killed.

The named members of Black September, and their deaths, are also mostly factual. Abdel Wael Zwaiter, a translator at the Libyan Embassy in Rome was shot eleven times, one bullet for each of the victims of the Munich Massacre, in the lobby of his apartment forty-one days after Munich. On the eighth of December of that year Mahmoud Hamshari, a senior PLO figure, was killed in Paris by a bomb concealed in the table below his telephone. Although the film depicts the bomb being concealed in the telephone itself, other details of the assassination (such as confirmation of the target via telephone call) are accurate. Others killed during this period include Mohammed Boudia, Basil Al Kubaisi, Hussein al-Bashir, and Zaiad Muchasi, some of whose deaths are depicted in the film. Ali Hassan Salameh was also a real person and a prominent member of Black September. In 1979 he was killed in Beirut by a car bomb that also killed four innocent bystanders and injured eighteen others.

The commando raid in Beirut, known as Operation Spring of Youth, also occurred. This attack included future Israeli Prime Minister Ehud Barak and Yom Kippur War and Operation Entebbe participant Yonatan Netanyahu, who are both portrayed by name in the film. The methods used to track down and assassinate the Black September members were much more complicated than the methods portrayed in the film; for example, the tracking of the Black September cell members was achieved by a network of Mossad agents, not an informant as depicted in the film.

Atlantic Productions, producers of BAFTA-nominated documentary Munich: Mossad's Revenge, listed several discrepancies between Spielberg's film and the information it obtained from interviews with Mossad agents involved in the operation. It noted that the film suggests one group carried out almost all the assassinations, whereas in reality, it was a much larger team. Mossad did not work with a mysterious French underworld figure as portrayed in the book and the film. The assassination campaign did not end because agents lost their nerve but because of the Lillehammer affair in which an innocent Moroccan waiter was killed. This is not mentioned in the film. As acknowledged by Spielberg, the targets were not all directly involved in Munich.

Former Mossad operatives criticized the film for inaccurately portraying Mossad operations. David Kimche, the former deputy director of the Mossad, said "I think it is a tragedy that a person of the stature of Steven Spielberg, who has made such fantastic films, should have based this film on a book that is a falsehood." Former Mossad operatives Gad Shimron and Victor Ostrovsky also dismissed the scene in which Prime Minister Golda Meir personally recruits Avner to lead the team as fiction. Mossad veterans were critical of the modus operandi portrayed by the film, in which a single hit team is sent into the field for months, and which includes a forger and bomb-maker to enable it to function alone. They claimed that in reality, the assassinations were conducted by large numbers of personnel, with hit teams assembled and sent out on an ad hoc basis, never spending more than a few days or at most weeks in the field, and withdrawn as soon as each mission was complete. The all-male makeup of the team was criticized; former operatives claimed it was standard practice to include female agents on such missions to help get closer to targets. The film's portrayal of the assassins as gradually developing feelings of revulsion over what they were doing was also panned as inaccurate, with veterans claiming that the assassins did not doubt what they were doing and that the Mossad provides psychologists for any agents who develop doubts about their missions.

According to British intelligence writer Gordon Thomas, senior Mossad personnel, among them director general Meir Dagan, held a private viewing of the film, and "In the darkened cinema they sat first in silence and then a steady mounting murmured chorus of 'it could never have happened like this' … 'this is fantasy' … 'this is pure fiction' … 'this is history, Hollywood style'." Thomas cited Dagan as calling the film "absolute rubbish" and claiming that those who view Munich would come away with a "seriously distorted view of the truth." He also cited one of Dagan's aides as stating "Dagan felt Munich is more Indiana Jones than any semblance of reality. The hunting down of the Black September killers was a carefully controlled operation that involved a large number of people. The kidon had undergone weeks of studying their targets. Little of this appears in the film."

== Reception ==
=== Box office ===
The film grossed $47 million at the box office in North America but performed better overseas, earning $83 million which brings the worldwide total of $131 million.

=== Critical reception ===
On Rotten Tomatoes, the film has a 79% approval rating based on 210 reviews, with an average rating of 7.40/10. The site's consensus reads, "Munich can't quite achieve its lofty goals, but this thrilling, politically even-handed look at the fallout from an intractable political conflict is still well worth watching." Metacritic assigned the film a weighted average score of 74 out of 100, based on 39 critics, indicating "generally favorable reviews". Audiences polled by CinemaScore gave the film an average grade of "B+" on an A+ to F scale.

Roger Ebert praised the film, saying, "With this film [Spielberg] has dramatically opened a wider dialogue, helping to make the inarguable into the debatable." He placed it at No. 3 on his top ten list of 2005. James Berardinelli wrote that "Munich is an eye-opener – a motion picture that asks difficult questions, presents well-developed characters, and keeps us white-knuckled throughout." He named it the best film of the year; it was the only film in 2005 to which Berardinelli gave four stars, and he also put it on his Top 100 Films of All Time list. Entertainment Weekly film critic Owen Gleiberman mentioned Munich amongst the best movies of the decade. Rex Reed from The New York Observer disagrees, writing: "With no heart, no ideology and not much intellectual debate, Munich is a big disappointment, and something of a bore."

Variety reviewer Todd McCarthy called Munich a "beautifully made" film. However, he criticized the film for failing to include "compelling" characters, and for its use of laborious plotting and a "flabby script." McCarthy says that the film turns into "... a lumpy and overlong morality play on a failed thriller template." To succeed, McCarthy states that Spielberg would have needed to engage the viewer in the assassin squad leader's growing crisis of conscience and create a more "sustain(ed) intellectual interest" for the viewer. Writing in Empire, Ian Nathan wrote "Munich is Steven Spielberg's most difficult film. It arrives already inflamed by controversy. ... This is Spielberg operating at his peak—an exceptionally made, provocative, and vital film for our times."

Chicago Tribune reviewer Allison Benedikt calls Munich a "competent thriller", but laments that as an "intellectual pursuit, it is little more than a pretty prism through which superficial Jewish guilt and generalized Palestinian nationalism" are made to "... look like the product of serious soul-searching." Benedikt states that Spielberg's treatment of the film's "dense and complicated" subject matter can be summed up as "Palestinians want a homeland, Israelis have to protect theirs." She rhetorically asks: "Do we need another handsome, well-assembled, entertaining movie to prove that we all bleed red?"

Gabriel Schoenfeld, writing for Commentary, was also critical of the film, calling it "pernicious". Comparing the fictional narrative to history, he asserted that Spielberg, and especially Kushner, felt that the Palestinian terrorists and the Mossad agents are morally equivalent, and concluded: "The movie deserves an Oscar in one category only: most hypocritical film of the year." Israeli author and journalist Aaron J. Klein wrote in Slate that the movie was a "distortion" of facts, concluding that "A rigorous factual accounting may not be the point of Munich, which Spielberg has characterized as a 'prayer for peace.' But as result, Munich has less to do with history and the grim aftermath of the Munich Massacre than some might wish."

In defense of the climactic sex scene, critics Jim Emerson of the Chicago Sun-Times and Matt Zoller Seitz of Salon compared it to Lady Macbeth's suicide in William Shakespeare's Macbeth, interpreting the sequence as representing the corruption of Avner's personal life as a result of his being conditioned to kill others to avenge Munich.

==== Portrayal of Israeli assassins ====
Some reviewers criticized Munich for what they call the film's equating the Israeli assassins with "terrorists". Leon Wieseltier wrote in The New Republic: "Worse, Munich prefers a discussion of counter-terrorism to a discussion of terrorism; or it thinks that they are the same discussion".

Melman and other critics of the book and the film have said that the story's premise—that Israeli agents had second thoughts about their work—is not supported by interviews or public statements. In an interview with Reuters, a retired head of Israel's Shin Bet intelligence service and former Internal Security Minister, Avi Dichter, likened Munich to a children's adventure story: "There is no comparison between what you see in the movie and how it works in reality". In a Time magazine cover story about the film on December 4, 2005, Spielberg said that the source of the film had second thoughts about his actions. "There is something about killing people at close range that is excruciating," Spielberg said. "It's bound to try a man's soul." Of the real Avner, Spielberg says, "I don't think he will ever find peace."

The Zionist Organization of America (ZOA) – describing itself as "the oldest, and one of the largest, pro-Israel and Zionist organizations in the United States" – called for a boycott of the film on December 27, 2005. The ZOA criticized the factual basis of the film and leveled criticism at one of the screenwriters, Tony Kushner, whom the ZOA has described as an "Israel-hater". Criticism was also directed at the Anti-Defamation League's (ADL) National Director, Abraham Foxman, for his support of the film.

David Edelstein of Slate magazine argued that "The Israeli government and many conservative and pro-Israeli commentators have lambasted the film for naiveté, for implying that governments should never retaliate. But an expression of uncertainty and disgust is not the same as one of outright denunciation. What Munich does say is that this shortsighted tit-for-tat can produce a kind of insanity, both individual and collective."

Ilana Romano, widow of Yossef Romano, an Israeli weightlifter who was killed in the Munich massacre, said that Spielberg overlooked the Lillehammer affair, although Spielberg seems to have been conscious of the omission; the film's opening title frame shows Lillehammer in a montage of city names, with Munich standing out from the rest. The Jewish Journal said that "the revenge squad obsess about making sure only their targets are hit – and meticulous care is taken to avoid collateral damage. Yet in one shootout an innocent man is also slain ... The intense moral contortions the agents experience as the corpses pile up makes up the substance of the movie."

According to Israeli journalist Ronen Bergman, as reported in Newsweek, it is a myth that Mossad agents hunted down and killed those responsible for the killing of eleven Israeli athletes and a German policeman at the 1972 Munich Olympic Games, claiming most of the people were never killed or caught. He claims that most of the people that Mossad did kill had nothing to do with the Munich deaths. He also says the film was based on a book whose source was an Israeli who claimed to be the lead assassin of the hit squad, but instead was a baggage inspector at Tel Aviv airport.

== Accolades ==
=== Top ten lists ===
Munich was listed on many critics' top ten lists of 2005.

- 1st – Owen Gleiberman, Entertainment Weekly
- 1st – James Berardinelli, Reelviews
- 1st – David Edelstein, Slate
- 2nd – William Arnold, Seattle Post-Intelligencer
- 2nd – Scott Tobias, The A.V. Club
- 3rd – Roger Ebert, Chicago Sun-Times
- 4th – Richard Roeper, Ebert & Roeper
- 4th – Claudia Puig, USA Today
- 5th – Peter Travers, Rolling Stone
- 5th – Lisa Schwarzbaum, Entertainment Weekly
- 5th – Richard Schickel, Time
- 5th – Kimberly Jones, Austin Chronicle
- 5th – Ty Burr, Boston Globe
- 5th – Kenneth Turan, Los Angeles Times
- 7th – Scott Foundas, L.A. Weekly
- 8th – David Ansen, Newsweek
- 8th – Steve Davis, Austin Chronicle
- 9th – Chris Kaltenbach, Baltimore Sun
- 9th – Harry Knowles, Ain't It Cool News
- 10th – Michael Wilmington, Chicago Tribune
- 10th – Tasha Robinson, The A.V. Club
- 10th – A.O. Scott, The New York Times
- Top 10 (listed alphabetically) – Carrie Rickey & Steven Rea, Philadelphia Inquirer
- Top 10 (listed alphabetically) – Manohla Dargis, The New York Times

=== Awards and nominations ===
Award	Category	Recipient(s)	Result
Academy Awards	Best Picture	Steven Spielberg, Kathleen Kennedy, Barry Mendel	Nominated
Academy Awards	Best Director	Steven Spielberg	Nominated
Academy Awards	Best Adapted Screenplay	Tony Kushner, Eric Roth	Nominated
Academy Awards	Best Film Editing	Michael Kahn	Nominated
Academy Awards	Best Original Score	John Williams	Nominated
AFI Awards	Best International Actor	Eric Bana	Nominated
ACE Eddie Awards	Best Edited Feature Film – Dramatic	Michael Kahn	Nominated
Central Ohio Film Critics Association Awards	Best Ensemble Cast		Won
Critics' Choice Awards	Best Picture	Munich	Nominated
Critics' Choice Awards	Best Director	Steven Spielberg	Nominated
Directors Guild of America Awards	Outstanding Directing – Feature Film	Steven Spielberg	Nominated
Empire Awards	Best Thriller	Munich	Nominated
Golden Eagle Awards	Best Foreign Language Film	Munich	Nominated
Golden Globe Awards	Best Director	Steven Spielberg	Nominated
Golden Globe Awards	Best Screenplay	Tony Kushner, Eric Roth	Nominated
Golden Reel Awards	Sound Editing in Feature Film		Nominated
Golden Trailer Awards	Trailer of the Year		Nominated
Grammy Awards	Best Score Soundtrack Album for Motion Picture, Television or Other Visual Media	John Williams	Nominated
Kansas City Film Critics Circle Awards	Best Film	Munich	Won
Kansas City Film Critics Circle Awards	Best Director	Steven Spielberg	Won
Kansas City Film Critics Circle Awards	Best Adapted Screenplay	Tony Kushner, Eric Roth	Won
National Society of Film Critics Awards	Best Supporting Actor	Mathieu Amalric	Nominated
National Society of Film Critics Awards	Best Screenplay	Tony Kushner	Nominated
New York Film Critics Circle Awards	Best Film	Munich	Nominated
New York Film Critics Circle Awards	Best Director	Steven Spielberg	Nominated
New York Film Critics Circle Awards	Best Supporting Actor	Mathieu Amalric	Nominated
New York Film Critics Circle Awards	Best Screenplay	Tony Kushner	Nominated
Online Film Critics Society Awards	Best Picture	Munich	Nominated
Online Film Critics Society Awards	Best Director	Steven Spielberg	Nominated
Online Film Critics Society Awards	Best Adapted Screenplay	Tony Kushner, Eric Roth	Nominated
Online Film Critics Society Awards	Best Editing	Michael Kahn	Nominated
Online Film Critics Society Awards	Best Original Score	John Williams	Nominated
Washington D.C. Area Film Critics Association Awards	Best Film	Munich	Won
Washington D.C. Area Film Critics Association Awards	Best Director	Steven Spielberg	Won
Washington D.C. Area Film Critics Association Awards	Best Supporting Actor	Geoffrey Rush	Nominated
Washington D.C. Area Film Critics Association Awards	Best Adapted Screenplay	Tony Kushner	Nominated
World Soundtrack Awards	Best Original Soundtrack	John Williams	Nominated

== See also ==
- List of Israeli assassinations
- Extrajudicial killing
- Operations conducted by the Mossad
- Palestinian political violence
- Sword of Gideon
- September 5 – 2024 film also about the massacre, from the perspective of ABC Sports
- Zionist political violence

== Works cited ==
- Girling, Richard (January 15, 2006). "A Thirst for Vengeance: The Real Story behind Munich". The Sunday Times. London. Archived from the original on October 2, 2013. Alt URL (subscription required)
