= Sword of Gideon =

1986 Canadian television film

- Genre: Action; Drama; Thriller
- Based on: Vengeance by George Jonas
- Screenplay by: Chris Bryant
- Directed by: Michael Anderson
- Starring: Steven Bauer; Michael York; Robert Joy; Laurent Malet; Peter Dvorsky; Rod Steiger; Lino Ventura; Colleen Dewhurst; Leslie Hope; John Hirsch; Cyrielle Clair; Linda Griffiths; Daniel Alfie; Hrant Alianak; Sonia Benezra
- Music by: Georges Delerue
- Country of origin: Canada
- Original language: English

Production
- Executive producers: Denis Héroux; John Kemeny; Robert Lantos
- Producer: George Jonas
- Cinematography: Claude Agostini
- Editor: Ron Wisman
- Running time: 173 min.
- Production company: HBO Pictures

Original release
- Network: CTV; HBO
- Release: November 29, 1986

Sword of Gideon is a 1986 Canadian television film about Mossad agents hunting down terrorists associated with the 1972 Munich massacre. It was first shown on the CTV Television Network in Canada as a four-hour miniseries and later on HBO in the United States. Directed by Michael Anderson and written by Chris Bryant, the film stars Steven Bauer and Michael York. The film is based on the book Vengeance by George Jonas, an account of the incident which has been criticized by some intelligence personnel as fictional, though because of its covert nature is difficult to prove or disprove. In some countries the book was titled Vengeance: Sword of Gideon, from which the movie title is drawn. The story was retold in the 2005 film Munich by Steven Spielberg.

== Plot ==
Avner, an adept Israeli military officer, is interrupted from his service in the IDF by a special request from Israeli Prime Minister Golda Meir to join Mossad, Israel's intelligence agency. Despite warnings from his father, he agrees to join, and becomes the leader of an elite five-man group assigned to assassinate all of the Black September terrorists involved in the Munich massacre. Shortly before embarking, however, his wife reveals to him that she is pregnant, to Avner's surprise.

The undercover unit is dispatched to Europe, where most of the terrorists are located, and begin assassinating them via firearms and bombs. Initially, they are very successful, but after Avner witnesses one of their targets' wife and daughter crying in the hospital upon learning of his death, he soon begins to question the morality of his mission.

Eventually, the unit becomes wanted internationally for the assassinations, and spies dispatched by Black September are successful in killing most of Avner's team over the course of several months. After a botched assassination attempt of two targets results in the team almost being wiped out, Avner asks the case officer in charge of the mission to abort, and his request is granted, ending the mission with only two survivors.

Upon returning to Israel, Avner's case officer reveals that his Mossad contract length is three years, prompting him to angrily attempt to quit his job and move to New York with his wife and infant son. There, he is the target of harassment by his case officer, who attempts to convince him to return to Israel and go on another mission for Mossad. Avner refuses, stating that he only wants to join the IDF and become an officer again. His boss flatly rejects the offer, and withdraws all of Avner's money from his bank account as punishment for violating his contract with Mossad, leaving the family completely broke. However, he purchases and repairs an old apartment, and is able to make a modest living as a taxi cab driver.

As the movie ends, Avner can be seen commanding an IDF armored column through the desert, and a paragraph of text explains that he returned to Israel to command his tank unit during the Yom Kippur War.

== Cast ==
- Steven Bauer as Avner
- Michael York as Robert
- Robert Joy as Hans
- Laurent Malet as Jean
- Peter Dvorsky as Carl
- Rod Steiger as Mordechai Samuels
- Lino Ventura as Papa
- Colleen Dewhurst as Prime Minister Golda Meir
- Leslie Hope as Shoshana
- John Hirsch as Avner's Father
- Cyrielle Clair as Jeanette Von Lesseps
- Linda Griffiths as Carl's Widow
- Daniel Alfie as Ali Salameh
- Hrant Alianak as Wael Zwaiter
- Sonia Benezra as Mrs. Hamshari

== Home media ==
The film was released on VHS by HBO/Cannon Video under license from Home Box Office. However, HBO didn't own it and then in 2004 was released on DVD by Echo Bridge Home Entertainment. Currently, the film belongs to Lionsgate (via Entertainment One (formerly Alliance Entertainment)).
