= Killing of Christine Demeter =

Canadian model (1940–1973)

Christine Demeter (/ˈdɛmətər/; 1940 – July 18, 1973) was murdered in the garage of her home in Mississauga, Ontario, Canada, at the age of 33. The case attracted much attention in Canada because Demeter, a model, was considered to be young and beautiful, and her murder had been mysterious.

The case was investigated by Detective William Teggart (who would later rise to police chief) of the Peel Regional Police. Demeter's husband, Peter Demeter, was subsequently convicted, seventeen months after the killing, of hiring a killer to murder her to cash in on a million-dollar insurance policy. He was sentenced to life imprisonment. He later received a second life sentence for unrelated criminal acts; as of May 31, 2010, then 77 years old, he was still in prison in Ontario.

George Jonas and his then-wife Barbara Amiel, published a book about the case, By Persons Unknown: The Strange Death of Christine Demeter (1976).

The Demeter case served as the basis for the fictional 1978 film I Miss You, Hugs and Kisses, directed by Murray Markowitz. The victim is renamed Magdalene Kruschen and is played by German actress Elke Sommer.
