= Munich: Mossad's Revenge =

- Created by: Atlantic Productions
- Written by: Tom Whitter
- Directed by: Tom Whitter; Tom Pollock
- Country of origin: United Kingdom
- No. of episodes: 1

Production
- Running time: approx. 48 min.

Original release
- Network: Channel 4
- Release: 26 January 2006

Munich: Mossad's Revenge is a documentary produced by Atlantic Productions and aired on Channel 4 in Britain concerning Mossad assassinations following the Munich massacre. The documentary includes interviews with many of the agents involved in the operation.

Munich: Mossad's Revenge was nominated for a British Academy of Film and Television Arts award in 2006 in the "Specialist Factual" category.

According to the producers, Atlantic Productions, the real people involved in Mossad assassinations following the Munich massacre agreed to speak for the first time "to set the record straight" because of the recent release of Steven Spielberg's film Munich. The documentary contains interviews with David Kimche, the British-born former deputy chief of Mossad; Efraim Halevy, former chief of Mossad, also British-born; Ehud Barak, the former Prime Minister of Israel and formerly a member of an elite special forces unit which raided Beirut to kill three PLO figures (Operation Spring of Youth); and two anonymous agents the producers claim were involved in the hits identified only as officers K and G.

The producers of the documentary listed several discrepancies between the film Munich and the information it obtained from its interviews with Mossad agents. It noted that the film suggests one group carried out almost all the assassinations, whereas in reality it was a much larger team. Mossad did not work with a mysterious French underworld figure as portrayed in the film. The assassination campaign did not end because agents lost their nerve but because of the disastrous Lillehammer affair in which an innocent Moroccan waiter was killed, an incident not covered in the film. The assassination targets were not all directly involved in the Munich massacre, a fact which is only acknowledged in the last 5 minutes of the film.
