= Sándor Kopácsi =

Hungarian chronicler and participant in the 1956 revolution (1922-2001)

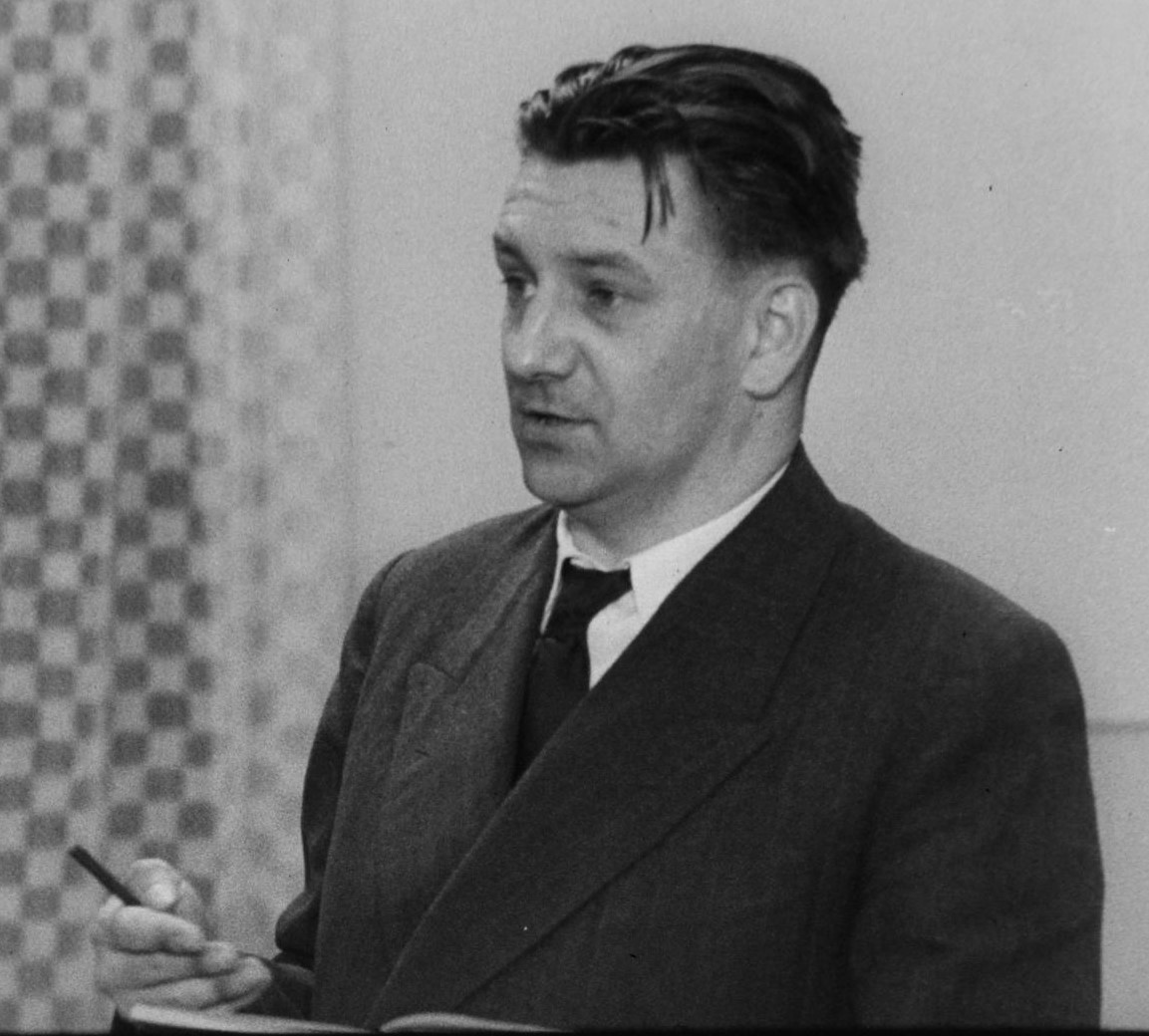
- Kopácsi in 1958

Member of the National Assembly
- In office 1953–1956

Personal details
- Born: March 5, 1922 Miskolc, Hungary
- Died: March 2, 2001 (aged 78) Toronto, Canada
- Resting place: New Public Cemetery, Budapest
- Party: Hungarian Socialist Workers' Party; Hungarian Working People's Party (1948–1956); Hungarian Communist Party (1945–1948)

Sándor Kopácsi (5 March 1922 – 2 March 2001) was a participant and chronicler of the Hungarian Revolution of 1956.

== Early career ==
He began his professional life as a metalworker, as did his father and grandfather. In 1944, he fought with the resistance movement organized by MOKÁN (in English, the Anti-Nazi Committee of Hungarian Communists). After the war, many of its members (including Kopácsi) were enlisted to help form the nation's new police force. After a posting to Budapest in 1949, he was appointed Director of Internment Affairs in the Interior Ministry. Despite the impressive title, he was not allowed to do much more than manage paperwork relating to the labor camps. When he attempted to exercise his authority on behalf of the prisoners, he was dismissed and sent to a Party school for re-training. In 1952, he became the Police Chief of Budapest. At that time the Police Department was effectively a branch of ÁVH (the State Protection Authority). According to Kopácsi, more policemen were arrested than criminals, so he set about to make the Department more independent. A year later, he was elected to the Hungarian Parliament where he soon became part of the reform movement led by Imre Nagy.

== The Revolution & After ==
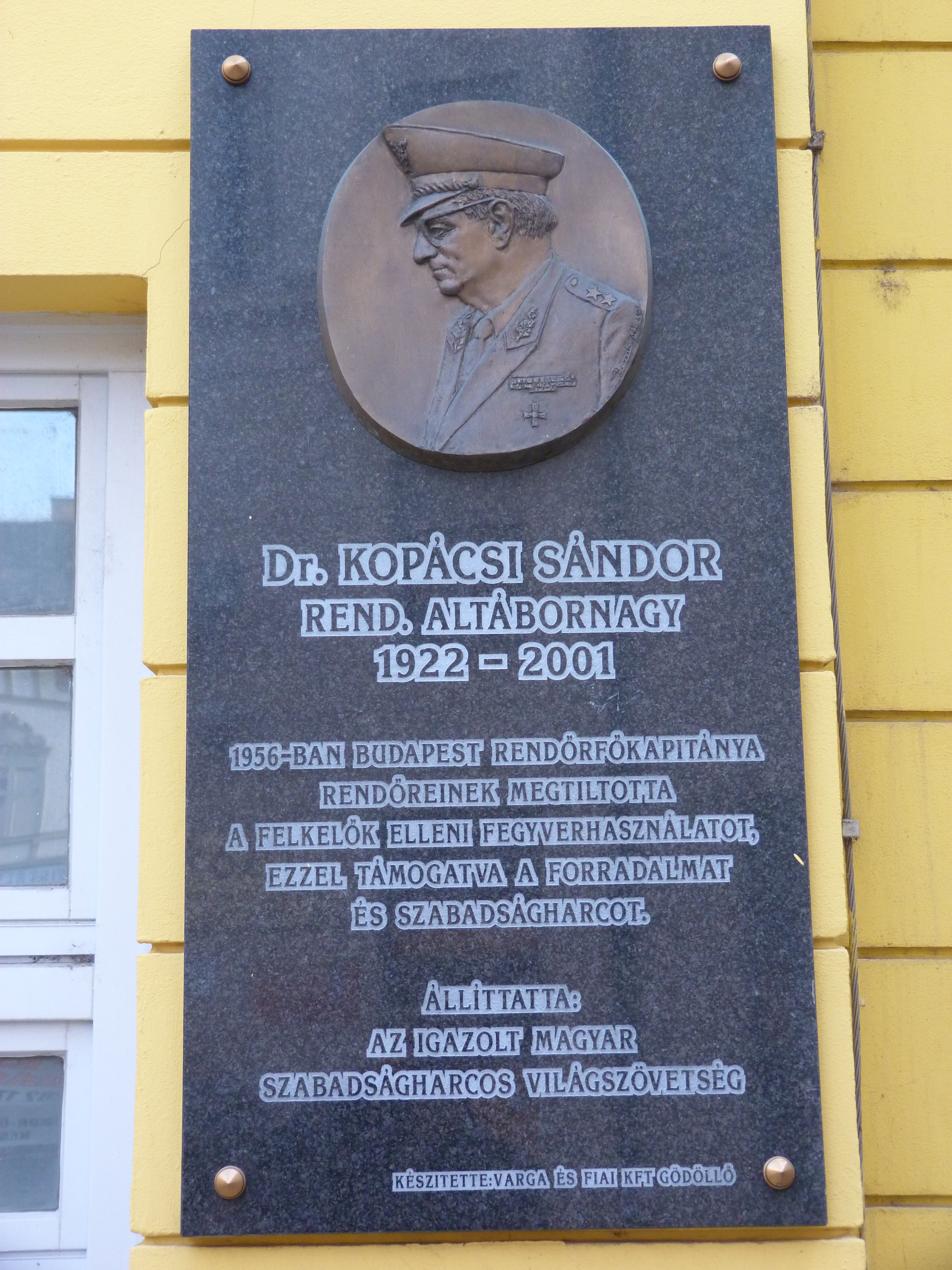
Commemorative plaque of Sándor Kopácsi in Budapest District VIII, Corvin Alley No 1 (Corvin Movie Theater)

After the 20th Congress of the CPSU in 1956, Kopácsi spoke out openly, at a police party meeting, against Mátyás Rákosi. Influenced by events during the Poznań workers' uprising, he and several others announced at a meeting of high-ranking army and police officers that they would not fire on the people. On October 31, 1956, Kopácsi was included in the executive committee of the HSWP, charged with preparing for the first congress. He won the confidence of the insurgent groups during the revolution, and on November 3, he was elected deputy commander of the national guard, at a meeting of special forces at the Kilián Barracks (9th District). His plan, at talks with Imre Nagy, was for the rebels to be disarmed after the fighting had ceased. On November 5, 1956, he was arrested by Ivan Serov, the head of the KGB. Placed on trial with Nagy and his associates, Kopácsi was sentenced to life imprisonment by the Supreme Court on June 15, 1958, but was freed in the 1963 amnesty. From 1963 to 1965, he worked as a turner in the telephone factory, but then he found a job in Solymár (Pest County) as a technical officer. In 1969, he obtained permission to complete his university studies, but on receiving his law degree, he failed to find a job to match his qualifications. In 1975, he emigrated with his wife to Canada, where he was employed as a waiter, a worker in a refrigerator factory, and then as a manual laborer in Ontario Hydro, the provincial electrical utility.

== Book ==
The original manuscript in Hungarian was over a thousand pages long. With the help of Tibor Tardos, a Hungarian journalist living in Paris, the manuscript was abridged, edited and translated into French. "Au Nom de la Classe Ouvrière" was published by Éditions Robert Laffont in 1979. Shortly thereafter, it came to the attention of Canadian journalists Daniel & Judy Stoffman, who arranged for an interview with the author that was published in the Toronto Star . This led to an English translation under his direction. It remains an important primary source on the revolution.

== Final years ==
He retired in 1987. In 1989, he was named Righteous Among the Nations by Yad Vashem - Holocaust commemoration authority of the state of Israel - for sheltering Jews in his home during World War II. After the fall of the Communist government in 1990, he returned to Hungary where his military rank was restored. He went back to Canada in 2000, and died of a heart attack on March 2, 2001.

== Memoirs ==
- In the Name of the Working Class: the Inside Story of the Hungarian Revolution, translated by Daniel & Judy Stoffman with a foreword by George Jonas, Grove Press (1987). ISBN 0-8021-0010-4
