= Andy McSmith =

English journalist

Andy McSmith is a freelance English journalist.

McSmith was chief press officer for the Labour Party in the 1980s, working with director of communications Peter Mandelson.

He was a journalist at The Independent newspaper from April 2007 to April 2016, having previously been political correspondent on the same paper, and political editor of the Independent on Sunday (same newspaper) and chief political correspondent of The Daily Telegraph and The Observer (part of the Guardian stable). In 1993 he was sacked by the Daily Mirror and Labour Party MPs raised his dismissal in a motion in the House of Commons.

He is the author of seven books: biographies of longtime Conservative politician Kenneth Clarke and former Labour leader John Smith, a collection of short biographies called Faces of Labour: The Inside Story (1996), No Such Thing as Society: A History of Britain in the 1980s, Fear and the Muse Kept Watch (2015) about the great writers and artists who lived under Stalin's rule in the Soviet Union, a novel Innocent in the House, and Strange People I Have Known. He has also contributed to many other books. His play, One Bummer News Day, set in a newspaper office, was broadcast as part of the Play for Today series.

He lives in London.

== Bibliography ==
- Strange People I Have Known … And Other Stories (London: Biteback Publishing, 2023) ISBN 9781785908057
