= 1108 Demeter =

Asteroid

Discovery
- Discovered by: K. Reinmuth
- Discovery site: Heidelberg Obs.
- Discovery date: 31 May 1929

Designations
- Pronunciation: /dɪˈmiːtər/
- Named after: Demeter (Greek mythology)
- Alternative designations: 1929 KA · 1963 MF
- Minor planet category: main-belt · (inner); Phocaea · background

Orbital characteristics
- Epoch 23 March 2018 (JD 2458200.5)
- Uncertainty parameter 0
- Observation arc: 88.65 yr (32,378 d)
- Aphelion: 3.0510 AU
- Perihelion: 1.8040 AU
- Semi-major axis: 2.4275 AU
- Eccentricity: 0.2568
- Orbital period (sidereal): 3.78 yr (1,381 d)
- Mean anomaly: 139.57°
- Mean motion: 0° 15^{m} 38.16^{s} / day
- Inclination: 24.916°
- Longitude of ascending node: 234.25°
- Argument of perihelion: 78.109°

Physical characteristics
- Mean diameter: 25.285±0.057 km 25.35±6.72 km 25.61±2.0 km 27.316±0.221 km 27.333±5.042 km 31.06±0.58 km 31.33±0.45 km
- Synodic rotation period: 9.70±0.01 h 9.701±0.002 h 9.846±0.008 h 9.870±0.012 h
- Geometric albedo: 0.0229±0.0202; 0.031±0.005; 0.032±0.001; 0.0408±0.0040; 0.0464±0.008; 0.05±0.02
- Spectral type: Tholen = CX; B–V = 0.681; U–B = 0.308
- Absolute magnitude (H): 11.91; 12.51 · 12.51±0.38

1108 Demeter, provisional designation 1929 KA, is a dark asteroid from the inner regions of the asteroid belt, approximately 27 kilometers (17 miles) in diameter. It was discovered on 31 May 1929, by German astronomer Karl Reinmuth at the Heidelberg-Königstuhl State Observatory near Heidelberg, Germany. The asteroid was named after Demeter, the Greek goddess of fruitful soil and agriculture. It has a rotation period of 9.846 hours.

== Orbit and classification ==
Demeter is a non-family asteroid of the main belt's background population when applying the hierarchical clustering method to its proper orbital elements. Based on osculating Keplerian orbital elements, it has also been classified as a member of the Phocaea family (701), a large family of stony asteroids, different to Demeter's spectral type (see below).

It orbits the Sun in the inner main-belt at a distance of 1.8–3.1 AU once every 3 years and 9 months (1,381 days; semi-major axis of 2.43 AU). Its orbit has an eccentricity of 0.26 and an inclination of 25° with respect to the ecliptic. The asteroid was first observed at the Italian Observatory of Turin, three days prior to its official discovery observation at Heidelberg. The body's observation arc begins at Yerkes Observatory in December 1930.

== Physical characteristics ==
In the Tholen classification, Demeter's spectral type is ambiguous, closest to a carbonaceous C-type and somewhat similar to an X-type asteroid.

=== Rotation period ===
In June 2016, a rotational lightcurve of Demeter was obtained from photometric observations by American astronomers Tom Polakis and Brian Skiff at the Command Module Observatory (V02) in Tempe, Arizona. Lightcurve analysis gave a rotation period of 9.846 hours with an amplitude of 0.12 magnitude (U=3). Observations by the Spanish OBAS group, also taken during the 2016-opposition, gave a concurring period of 9.870 hours and a brightness variation of 0.11 magnitude (U=3-). The results supersede previous observations by Robert Stephens, Olivier Thizy, René Roy and Stéphane Charbonnel from July 2001, which gave a period of 9.70 and 9.701 hours with an amplitude of 0.12 and 0.14 magnitude, respectively.

=== Diameter and albedo ===
According to the surveys carried out by the Infrared Astronomical Satellite IRAS, the Japanese Akari satellite and the NEOWISE mission of NASA's Wide-field Infrared Survey Explorer, Demeter measures between 25.285 and 31.33 kilometers in diameter and its surface has a low albedo between 0.0229 and 0.05.

The Collaborative Asteroid Lightcurve Link adopts the results obtained by IRAS, that is, an albedo of 0.0464 and a diameter of 25.61 kilometers based on an absolute magnitude of 11.91.

== Naming ==
This minor planet was named from Greek mythology after Demeter, the goddess of fruitful soil and agriculture. The official naming citation was mentioned in The Names of the Minor Planets by Paul Herget in 1955 (H 104).

=== Conflict with Ceres ===
Demeter is the Greek equivalent of the Roman goddess Ceres. When main-belt asteroid and dwarf planet 1 Ceres was named, the Greeks called it Demeter, effectively translating the name into Greek, rather than using the Latin Ceres or the original Italian Cerere. However, this created a problem when asteroid Demeter was named. The Greeks resolved this by using the classical form of the name, Δημήτηρ Dēmêtēr, for the new asteroid, distinguishing it from the Modern Greek form Δήμητρα Dêmētra that had been used for 1 Ceres. This conflict did not occur in Greek-influenced Slavic languages such as Russian, which had adopted Cerera (Церера) for 1 Ceres, and were thus free to use the modern Greek form Demetra for the asteroid Demeter.
