= I Miss You, Hugs and Kisses =

- Theatrical release poster
- Directed by: Murray Markowitz
- Screenplay by: Murray Markowitz
- Produced by: Charles Zakery Markowitz; Murray Markowitz
- Starring: Elke Sommer; Donald Pilon
- Cinematography: Donald Wilder
- Edited by: Donald Ginsberg
- Music by: Howard Shore
- Production companies: Arcade Video; Astral Films; Intercity Video; Severin Films
- Release date: September 8, 1978
- Country: Canada
- Language: English

I Miss You, Hugs and Kisses (also known as Drop Dead, Dearest and Left for Dead) is a 1978 Canadian drama mystery film based on the Peter Demeter murder case. The film is one of the infamous "Video Nasties", and is the first film scored by Howard Shore.

== Cast ==
- Elke Sommer as Magdalene Kruschen
- Donald Pilon as Charles Kruschen
- Chuck Shamata as Gershen Isen
- George Touliatos as Tibor Zanopek
- Cindy Girling as Pauline Corte
- George Chuvalo as George Weiller
- Cec Linder as Chief Parker
- Richard Davidson as Barrington
- Miguel Fernandes as John MacGregor (as Miguel Fernández)
- Michelle Fansett as Johanna Luger
- Corinna Carlson as Angela Kruschen
- Linda Sorenson as Cynthia
- Susan Hogan as Secretary
- Larry Solway as Newscaster
- Ned Conlon as Judge
- Henry Cohen as Court Clerk
- Bill Walker as Mayor
- Lawrence Elion as Alliston
- Barry Bellchamp as Judge Foreman
- James Morris as Man in Office
- James Millington as Police Sergeant
- David Hovan as Reporter (as Ara Hovanessian)
- Don Ferguson as Journalist
- Kim Bailey as Cynthia's Daughter
