= Vengeance (Jonas book) =

1984 book

- First edition (1984)
- Author: George Jonas
- Language: English
- Genre: Narrative nonfiction
- Publisher: Simon & Schuster
- Publication date: 1984
- Publication place: United States
- Media type: Print Paperback
- Pages: 376
- ISBN: 0-671-50611-0
- OCLC: 10507421
- Dewey Decimal: 956/.04 19
- LC Class: DS119.7 .J55 1984

Vengeance is a 1984 book by George Jonas describing part of Mossad assassinations following the Munich massacre. It was re-released as Vengeance: The True Story of an Israeli Counter-Terrorist Team or Vengeance: Sword of Gideon in some later editions and countries.

The main source of the book is also the main character, Yuval Aviv, known in the book as Avner. A Mossad officer, he is recruited to lead a small team into Europe to assassinate a number of suspected PLO and Black September militants. Each of the book's chapters deals with a separate stage of the mission, including the background to each assassination. It has inspired both a 1986 made for television movie called Sword of Gideon and the 2005 Steven Spielberg film Munich.
