= Sonia Benezra =

Canadian television presenter

Sonia Benezra (born 25 September 1960 in Montreal, Quebec) is a Canadian broadcaster, described as "Quebec's answer to Barbara Walters". She has hosted shows on MusiquePlus, MusiMax, MuchMusic, MuchMoreMusic, TVA, and CHMP-FM. She has also worked as an actress and clothing designer.

== Career ==
Benezra is best known for hosting a daily live talk show on TQS for six years, featuring francophone and anglophone entertainers. Over 200 shows were produced per year, with more than 1 million viewers per show.

Benezra worked as co-host (2008–2009) for the English-language radio station CFQR (Q92) afternoon drive show. She is involved in the "Walk for Breast Cancer" charities in and around the Island of Montreal.

== Personal life ==
Benezra was born in Montreal to a Moroccan mother and Spanish father; Spanish is her first language. She was raised Jewish.
