= George Jonas =

Canadian-Hungarian writer (1935–2016)

- Jonas in a 2008 interview
- Born: June 15, 1935; Budapest, Kingdom of Hungary
- Died: January 10, 2016 (aged 80); Toronto, Ontario, Canada
- Resting place: Mount Pleasant Cemetery, Toronto
- Citizenship: Hungarian Canadian - dual citizenship
- Occupations: Writer, producer and columnist
- Spouses: Sylvia Nemes (m. 1960; div. 1969) Barbara Amiel (m. 1974; div. 1979) Maya Cho (m. 1986)
- Children: Alexander Jonas (with Sylvia Nemes) b. 1964
- Writing career
- Notable works: By Persons Unknown (1977), Vengeance (1984)
- Notable awards: 1978 Edgar Allan Poe Award for Best Fact Crime book Member Order of Canada
- Website: georgejonas.ca

George Jonas, CM (June 15, 1935 – January 10, 2016) was a Hungarian-born Canadian writer, poet, and journalist. A self-described classical liberal, he authored 16 books, including the bestseller Vengeance (1984), the story of an Israeli operation to kill the terrorists responsible for the 1972 Munich massacre. The book has been adapted for film twice, first as Sword of Gideon (1986) and as Munich (2005).

== Personal life ==
Jonas was born in Budapest, Kingdom of Hungary in 1935, the son of lawyer, composer, and former member of the Vienna State Opera, Dr. Georg M. Hübsch (1883-1972) and Magda Hübsch (née Klug; 1905–1997), Jonas was educated at the Lutheran Gymnasium between the years 1945 and 1954.

=== Marriage and family ===
Jonas married his first wife, Sylvia (née Nemes) in New York in 1960. Their son, Alexander, was born in 1964 in Toronto where they lived until they separated in 1968. He married Barbara Amiel in 1974; the couple divorced in 1979. A practicing Jew, Amiel insisted they marry in a synagogue; Jonas, a secular Jew, had written that it was the first time he had been inside one. According to Amiel's memoir, Jonas "used to kick her, fracturing two of her ribs and dislocating her jaw."

Jonas third marriage was to Maya (née Cho), who was born in South Korea. Maya is blind.

== Writing ==
Jonas and Amiel co-wrote By Persons Unknown: The Strange Death of Christine Demeter (1976), an account of the 1973 murder of Christine Demeter and the subsequent murder trial and conviction of her husband, Peter. Their work won the 1978 Edgar Award for Best Fact Crime book. He contributed to the National Review, Saturday Review, the Chicago Sun-Times, The Daily Telegraph (London), The Wall Street Journal, Foreign Policy magazine, the Hungarian Review (Budapest) and The National Interest.

== Career ==
Following his schooling, Jonas worked for Radio Budapest as a program director. He immigrated to Canada in 1956 following the 1956 Hungarian Revolution. Jonas worked as a freelance print and broadcast journalist until he was hired by the Canadian Broadcasting Corporation in 1962. There he worked as a staff editor and producer for the next 34 years producing his last show for CBC-TV in 1996. He was best known for producing the true crime series Scales of Justice, in collaboration with famed criminal lawyer Eddie Greenspan, for both CBC Radio and CBC Television. He worked as a columnist for the Toronto Sun from 1981 to 2001, when he moved to the National Post, where he remained a regular contributor until his death. He wrote 16 books, one play, and two operas.

Jonas was on the advisory board of the Munk Debates held semi-annually in Toronto, Ontario, Canada.

=== Vengeance ===
His 1984 book Vengeance was a bestseller, printed in 21 editions in 13 languages. It portrayed the events of the Israeli Mossad assassinations following the Munich massacre, undertaken in retaliation for the murder of Israeli athletes by Palestinian terrorists at the 1972 Olympics in Munich. The book was later adapted twice as films: first, as a made-for-TV-film Sword of Gideon (1986). It was later developed as a feature film Munich (2005), directed by Steven Spielberg and with a screenplay written by Tony Kushner, an American playwright who won the Pulitzer Prize.

In an extended article in Maclean's magazine in January 2006, Jonas wrote about the development of the book, for which he was commissioned by publishers who had heard Avner's story, and the long process of it being developed as a feature film. He felt that the film Munich suggests that there is little difference between terrorism and counter-terrorism, and thus Spielberg's movie had a spirit opposite to that of his book. In the article, Jonas notes that the world and opinions about allowable actions and grievances has changed in the nearly 20 years between when his book was published and the film was being developed. (He was not able to read the screenplay or see the film before commercial release, so did not influence what was done.)

Of some critics' assertions that his source for the book had fabricated his story, Avner told the publishers and Jonas that he was head of a Mossad hit team. Given the nature of intelligence and secret operations, Jonas acknowledged there was no sure way to determine whether his source was telling the truth, as governments do not like to confirm such material. But he had done considerable research, and said that he could confirm details at some of the places where his source had claimed to be operating.

== Illness and death ==
Jonas died on January 10, 2016, at the age of 80. He had suffered from Parkinson's disease for many years.

== Work ==
- The Absolute Smile, 1967 (poems)
- The Happy Hungry Man, 1970 (poems)
- Cities, 1973 (poems)
- By Persons Unknown: The Strange Death of Christine Demeter co-written with Barbara Amiel, 1977
- Final Decree, 1981 (novel)
- The Scales of Justice: Seven Famous Criminal Cases Recreated, 1983
- Vengeance, 1984
- Foreword for In the Name of the Working Class written by Sándor Kopácsi, Grove Press, 1986
- The Scales of Justice: Volume II, 1986
- Greenspan: The Case for the Defense, 1987 (biography)
- Crocodiles in the Bathtub and Other Perils, 1987 (articles 1977–87)
- A Passion Observed: A True Story of a Motorcycle Racer, 1989 (biography)
- Politically Incorrect: Notes on Liberty, Censorship, Social Engineering, Feminism, Apologists and other Topics of our Times, 1991
- The East Wind Blows West, 1993 (poems)
- Beethoven's Mask: Notes On My Life and Times, Key Porter Books, 2005 (autobiography)
- Reflections on Islam: Ideas, Opinions, Arguments, Key Porter Books, 2007
- The Jonas Variations: A Literary Séance, Cormorant Books, 2011 (poetry translations)

== Honours and awards ==
In 2013, Jonas was made a Member of the Order of Canada "for his thought-provoking contributions to Canadian public discourse as an author and journalist".

He received The Queen Elizabeth II Diamond Jubilee Medal "in recognition of his contributions to Canada" in 2012,

Other awards included: Edgar Allan Poe Award for the Best Crime Non-Fiction Book (New York, 1978), two Nelly Awards for the Best Radio Program (Toronto, 1983 and 1986), three National Magazine Awards (Toronto, 1991; 2006 and 2007), and two Gemini Awards for the Best TV Movie and for the Best Short Dramatic Program (Toronto, 1993).

== Other ==
- Ghert-Zand, Renee (January 16, 2016). "Author whose book inspired Spielberg's 'Munich' dies at 80". Times of Israel. Jerusalem.
